= Tayabas (disambiguation) =

Tayabas is a city in the Philippines.

Tayabas may also refer to the following places in the Philippines:

- Quezon, formerly known as Tayabas Province
- Tayabas Bay
- Tayabas Isthmus
