= Quezon =

Province in Calabarzon, Philippines

Quezon Tayabas
- Province
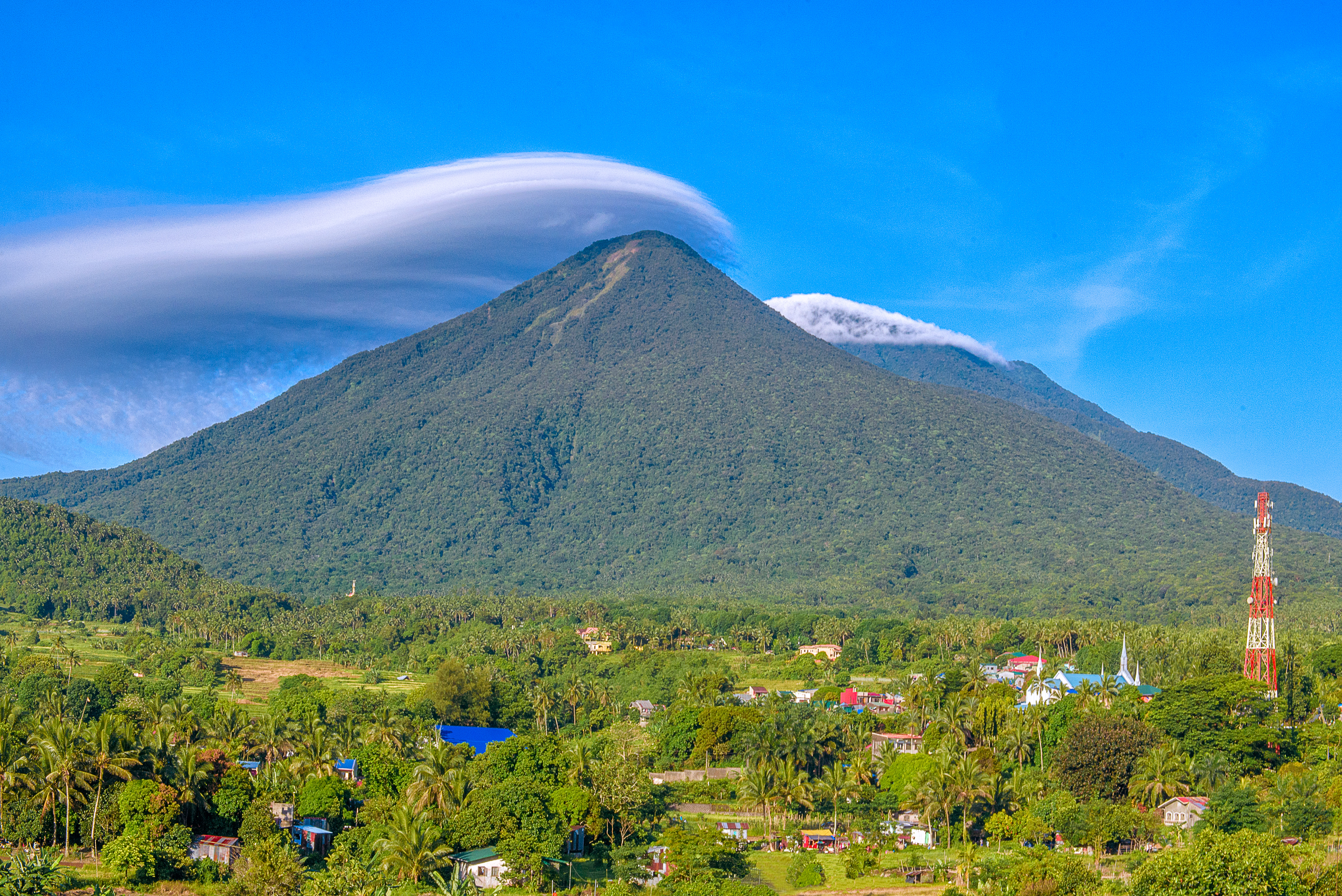
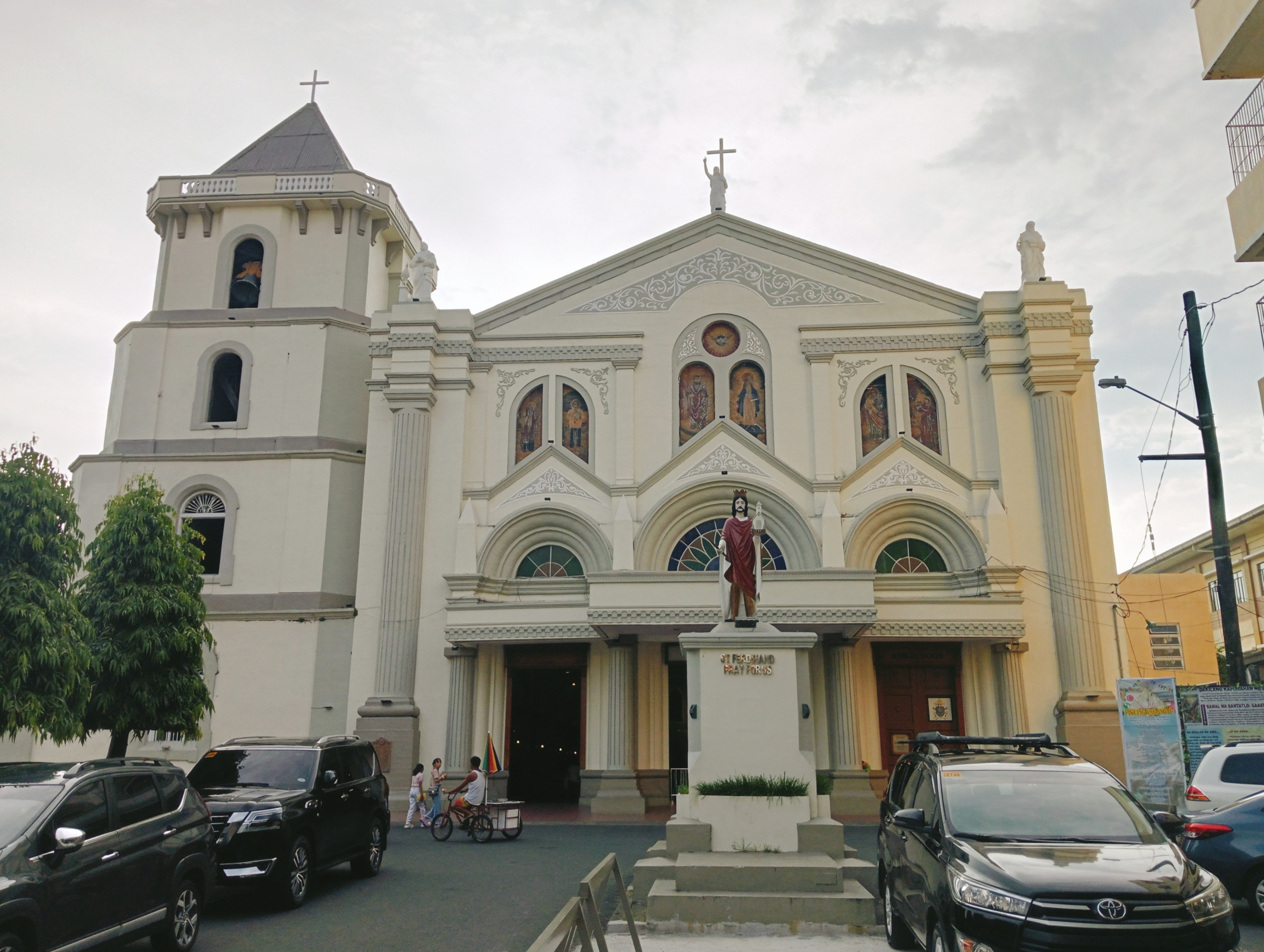
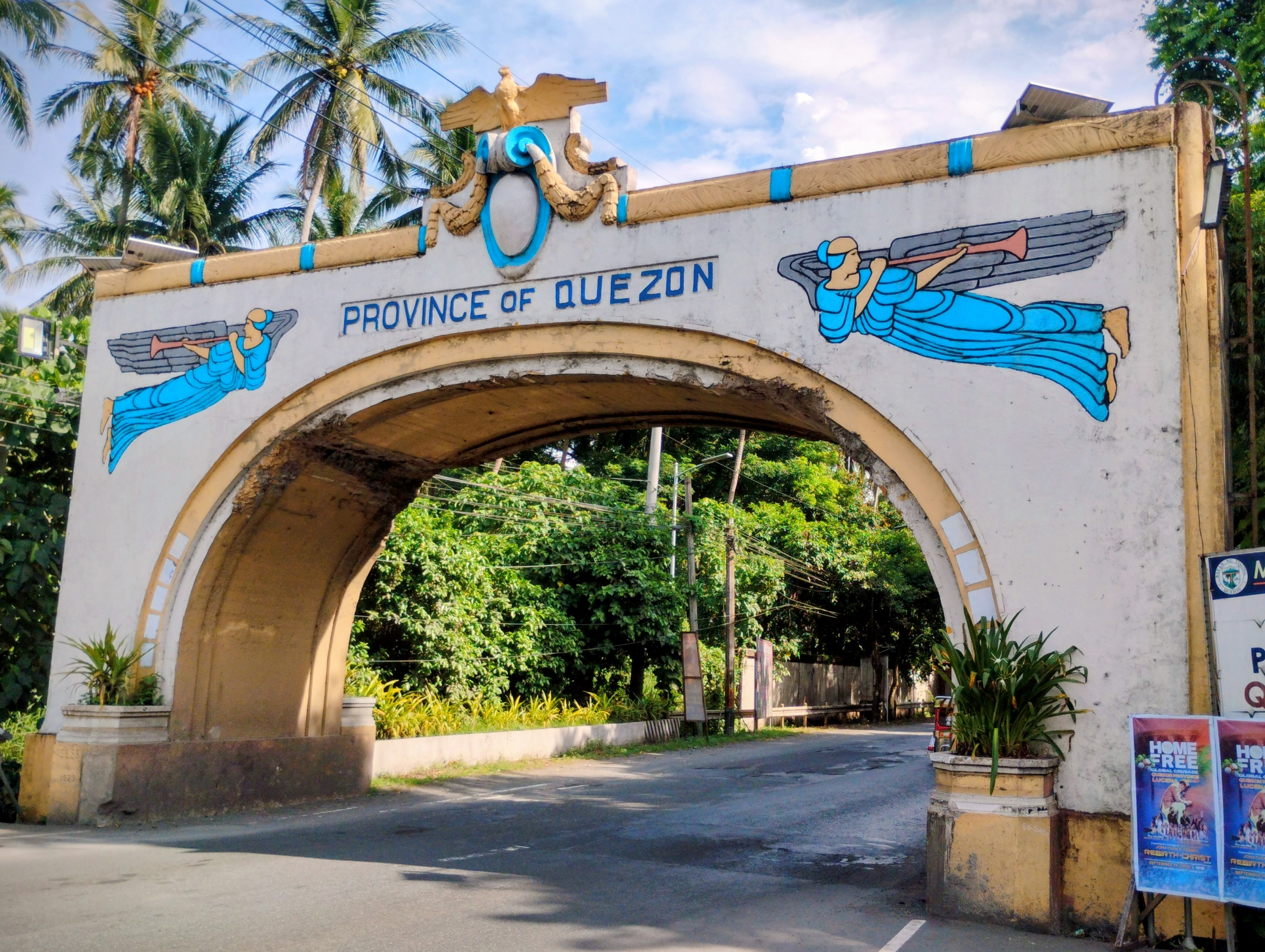
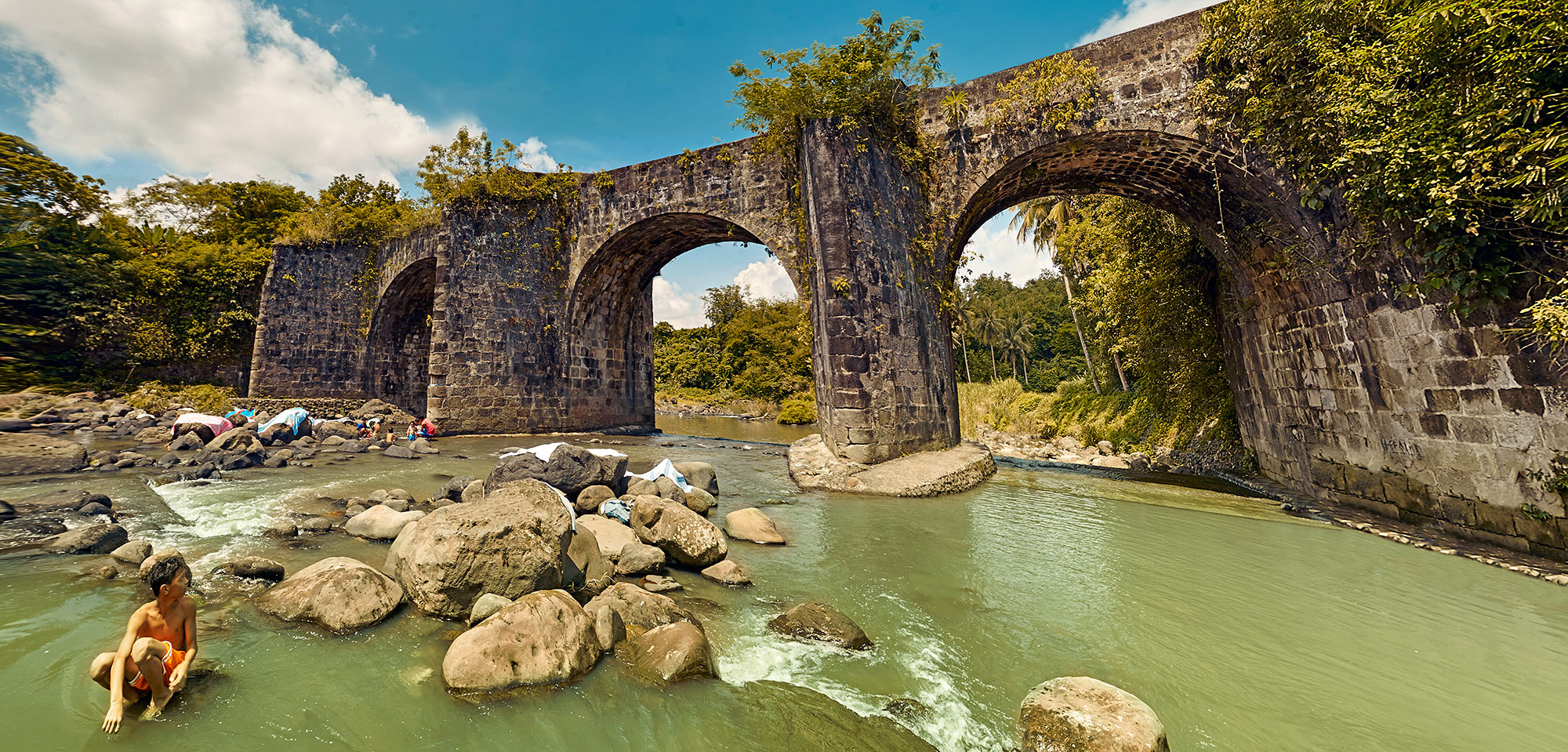
- (from top: left to right) Mount Banahaw de Lucban, St. Ferdinand Cathedral in Lucena, Quezon boundary arch in Tiaong, Malagonlong Bridge

- Flag Seal
- Nicknames: Cocolandia (Kaniyugan / Lupain ng Niyog); Food Basket of Calabarzon (Buslo ng Pagkain ng Calabarzon)
- Mottoes: Walang Tamad sa Quezon! Pilipinas, Quezon Naman! Healing Quezon
- Anthem: Lalawigan ng Quezon (Quezon Hymn)
- Location in the Philippines
- Interactive map of Quezon
- Coordinates: 13°56′N 121°37′E
- Country: Philippines
- Region: Calabarzon
- Foundation: 1591 (as Kalilayan)
- Secession from La Laguna: 1754 (as Tayabas)
- Present charter: March 12, 1901 (as Tayabas)
- Named for: Manuel L. Quezon
- Capital and largest city: Lucena*

Government
  - Governor: Angelina D.L. Tan (Stan Q)
  - Vice Governor: Anacleto A. Alcala III (Stan Q)
  - Legislature: Quezon Provincial Board
  - Electorate: 1,496,156 voters (2025)

Area
  - Total: 8,989.39 km^{2} (3,470.82 sq mi)
  - Rank: 8th out of 82
- Highest elevation (Mount Banahaw): 2,170 m (7,120 ft)

Population (2024 census)
  - Total: 1,980,338
  - Rank: 13th out of 82
  - Density: 220.297/km^{2} (570.567/sq mi)
  - Rank: 45th out of 82
  - Households: 483,703
- (excludes Lucena)
- Demonyms: Quezonian (English); Taga-Quezon/Quezonin (Tagalog); Tayabasin (Tagalog-dated); Tayabeño(-a) / Tayabense (Spanish-archaic)

Divisions
  - Independent cities: 1: Lucena*
  - Component cities: 1: Tayabas
  - Municipalities: 39: Agdangan; Alabat; Atimonan; Buenavista; Burdeos; Calauag; Candelaria; Catanauan; Dolores; General Luna; General Nakar; Guinayangan; Gumaca; Infanta; Jomalig; Lopez; Lucban; Macalelon; Mauban; Mulanay; Padre Burgos; Pagbilao; Panukulan; Patnanungan; Perez; Pitogo; Plaridel; Polillo; Quezon; Real; Sampaloc; San Andres; San Antonio; San Francisco; San Narciso; Sariaya; Tagkawayan; Tiaong; Unisan
  - Barangays: 1,209; including independent cities: 1,242
  - Districts: Legislative districts of Quezon (shared with Lucena)

Economy
  - Income class: 1st provincial income class
  - Poverty incidence: 6.9% (2023)
  - Revenue: ₱ 6,280 million (2024)
  - Assets: ₱ 16,846 million (2024)
  - Expenditure: ₱ 2,415 million (2024)
  - Liabilities: ₱ 5,135 million (2024)
- Time zone: UTC+8 (PHT)
- PSGC: 0405600000
- IDD : area code: +63 (0)42
- ISO 3166 code: PH-QUE
- Ethnic groups: Tagalog (90%); Bisaya/Cebuano (4.8%); Bicolano (3.6%); Ilokano (0.2%); Others (1.4%)
- Spoken languages: Tagalog (Tayabas dialect); Umiray Dumaget; Hatang Kayi; Ayta Kadi; Manide; Bikol; English; Ilokano; others
- Website: www.quezon.gov.ph
- * Lucena is a highly-urbanized city, politically independent from Quezon.

Quezon, (Note: UK: /ˈkeɪzɒn/, US: /ˈkeɪsɒn, -sɔːn, -soʊn/ Tagalog pronunciation: [ˈkɛson]) officially the Province of Quezon (Tagalog: Lalawigan ng Quezon) and historically known as Tayabas and Kalilayan, is a province in the Philippines located in the Calabarzon region on Luzon. Lucena, a highly urbanized city, serves as the provincial capital and its most popular city. The name of the province came from Manuel L. Quezon, the president of the Philippines from 1935 to 1944 and a native of Baler, which was formerly a part of the province. The province was known as Kalilayan upon its creation in 1591, renamed as Tayabas by the 18th century, before settling on its current name in 1946. To distinguish the province from Quezon City which was created in 1939 seven years before, it is also known as Quezon Province, a variation of the province's official name.

One of the largest provinces in the country, Quezon is situated on the southeastern portion of Luzon, with the majority of its territory lying on an isthmus that connects the Bicol Peninsula to the rest of Luzon. It also includes the Polillo Islands in the eastern part of the province. It is bordered by the provinces of Aurora and Bulacan to the north, Rizal, Laguna, and Batangas to the west, and Camarines Norte and Camarines Sur to the southeast. It also shares maritime borders with Marinduque and Masbate.

== History ==
=== Early history ===
Archaeological excavations in the province attest to its rich precolonial past. Archaeological materials including burial jars, human bones, shell middens and pot shreds have been discovered at different sites on Bondoc Peninsula, including the towns of San Narciso, San Andres, Mulanay and Catanauan. The most recent excavations were conducted in Catanauan by the Catanauan Archeological and Heritage Project.

According to the preliminary report released by the Catanauan Archaeological and Heritage Project, several excavations were conducted in the 1930s. One of the excavations was conducted in San Narciso where archaeologists found burial jars. The site, inspected by Ricardo Galang, resulted in the discovery of burial jars near the coast. Galang also went to San Andres, where excavations yielded 14th and 15th century ceramics as well as shell bracelets and beads. According to the journal as well, at a site named Tala, archaeologists discovered a glazed Chinese jar containing bone fragments from the early Ming dynasty. Looking at other archaeological sites located in adjacent areas like Marinduque and Masbate, it can be inferred that these excavations date back to the metal period of the archipelago.

In 2012, at Mount Kamhantik in the town of Mulanay, 15 limestone coffins were discovered. Carbon dating on a human tooth found it to be at least 1,000 years old. According to archaeologists, the village is proof that the ancient inhabitants of the area practiced a more sophisticated way of life. Metal tools are believed to have been used to carve the coffins, and this is the first of its kind discovered in the archipelago. The remains are said to date back to the 10th to 14th century.

=== Spanish colonial era ===
Territorial evolution of Quezon.

Originally, what now forms Quezon was divided among the provinces of Batangas, Laguna, and Nueva Ecija. However, at different points in time, the boundaries of Quezon changed and included parts of Aurora, Marinduque, and Camarines Norte. At the early period of Spanish colonization, the province of Aurora was called El Principe, Infanta was called Binangonan de Lampon, and southern Quezon was called Kalilayan. The first European to explore the area was Juan de Salcedo in 1571–1572, during his expedition from Laguna to Camarines provinces.

In 1574, Father Diego de Oropesa founded the town of Bumaka, now known as the municipality of Gumaca.

In 1591, through Governor General Gómez Pérez Dasmariñas, the province was created and was called Kaliraya or Kalilayan, after the capital town which later became Unisan.

In 1595, the Diocese of Cáceres was established by Pope Clement VIII as a suffragan of Manila. The diocese covered the entire Bicolandia region plus the towns in Kalilayan, and the Contracosta towns. At that time, the towns on the eastern seaboard were pertained to as the Contracosta and included towns from Mauban, Binangonan de Lampon, to El Principe.

The destruction of Kalilayan in 1604 by a big fleet of Moro pirates caused the inhabitants to transfer to Palsabangon (Pagbilao). Depredation and plunder by the Moros from Jolo and Brunei were rampant during the 1600s. Slavery is one reason for the proliferation of these raids. A padron for Calilaya was ordered after Tayabas suffered severely from Moro raids. It is said that 187 people were either captured or killed while 400 people fled. Fear from these raids is the primary reason as to the permanent movement of settlements along the coast further inland as well as a general decline in population. Frequent invasions by the moros disrupted food production in the province, affecting the nutrition of its inhabitants. Maternal malnutrition was even cited as one of the primary causes of infant mortality at that time. By 1701, the previously densely settled coastal areas of the province, were described as consisting of rancherias whose inhabitants depended on wild products.

In 1705, the Military Comandancia of Nueva Ecija was created and was governed by Governor General Fausto Cruzat y Góngora. It included huge swathes of Central Luzon, the Contracosta towns as well as the Kalilayan area and Polillo Islands. But Nueva Ecija was still part of La Pampanga province at that time. Since Contracosta and Kalilayan were part of La Laguna province at that time before including them in Nueva Ecija, they became jointly ruled by La Pampanga and La Laguna provinces.

In 1749, the capital was transferred to the town of Tayabas, from which the province got its new name.

In a report by a Spanish priest named Fr. Bartolome Galan in 1823, he describes the economy of the province. According to his report, Tayabas had poor soil and the terrain is hilly which meant that conditions were not that suitable for agriculture compared to other places. The people grew upland rice, wheat, beans and vegetables. Surplus rice was sold in San Pablo and Majayjay on Mondays, the market day of those towns. Cattle breeding was rampant in towns like Tayabas, Pagbilao, Tiaong, and Sariaya. Also, unlike other provinces, haciendas were not so many in Tayabas. Instead, residents owned most of their own land.

The people of Tayabas, as in other areas, actively traded with Manila. Santa Cruz, La Laguna, was the entrepot for all goods going to the capital. The people from Lucban made products of buri and pandan leaves like hats, sleeping mata and the like which they traded. They, along with the people of Mauban also went to Polillo, at that time part of Nueva Ecija, to buy sea slugs, shells and beeswax. Being a rich agricultural area, the town of Tayabas traded rice, coconuts, and panocha with nearby towns of Majayjay, Lucban, Sariaya, Pagbilao, Mauban, Gumaca, and Atimonan. In turn, they traded fish from Pagbilao, rice from Sariaya, and high quality abaca products from Mauban and Atimonan. Lucban, as well as Tayabas, benefitted greatly from the high commercial activity of Chinese and Chinese mestizos in the pueblos.

Gumaca, being a town with little arable land depended heavily on the sea. They collected sea slugs, and tortoise shells from Alabat and traded with the mountain people there for beeswax in exchange for clothing. They even sometimes ventured to Burias Island in Ragay Gulf in search of these goods. These products were then sent to Tayabas for shipment to Manila. Gumaca also traded items from nearby pueblos like vinegar and clothing for gold and abaca from Naga in the Bicol region.

In 1818, Nueva Ecija annexed the towns of Palanan, as well as Baler, Casiguran, Infanta (formerly called Binangonan de Lampon) and Polillo Islands from Tayabas.

In 1853, the new military district of Tayabas was carved from Nueva Ecija and included present-day southern Quezon as well as present-day Aurora. In 1858, Binangonan de Lampon and the Polillo Islands were separated from Nueva Ecija to form part of Infanta. According to the Catholic Bishops' Conference of the Philippines, the two Franciscan friars named Fray Juan de Plasencia and Fray Diego de Oropesa were the ones responsible for bringing Christianity to the area. The Franciscans are also credited with spreading Christianity to towns and parishes across the province including Mauban, Sariaya and Gumaca.

Between 1855 and 1885, El Principe was established as its own Military Comandancia with its capital in Baler.

==== Tayabas Uprising ====
It was also around this time that the Confradia de San Jose was active in the province, caused by growing inequality between the poor and the upper classes. This organization was directed mostly at the poor and neither admitted Spaniards nor mestizos.

After years under the Spanish regime, the colonized people grew discontented with the Spaniards over the centuries. The most important event in the history of the province was the Confradia Revolt in 1841, which was led by the famous Lucbanin, Apolinario de la Cruz, popularly known as Hermano Pule.

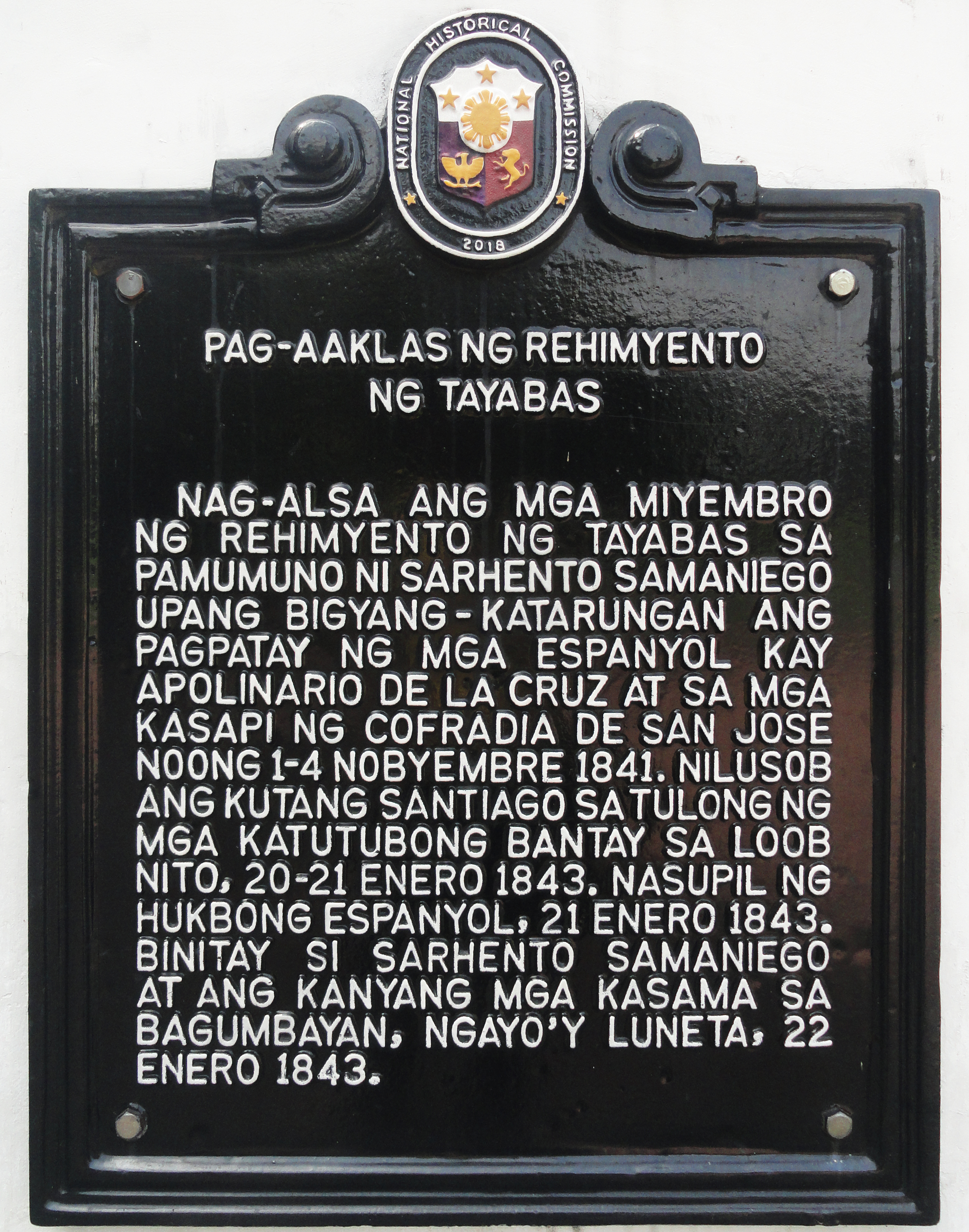
Tayabas Regiment Revolt

Years after the Cofradia Revolt, on January 20, 1843, the Tayabas Regiment, led by Sergeant Irineo Samaniego, rose in revolt against Spain, conquering Fort Santiago and other areas of Intramuros. This is the only native force in Philippine history to successfully capture Fort Santiago and Manila. For the first time, the word "Independence" was shouted by the Tayabas Regiment, encouraging their countrymen to revolt against Spain. The next day, however, the gates of Fort Santiago were opened by loyalist soldiers. After a bloody battle, the mutineers were defeated by loyalist troops, resulting in the execution of Samaniego and 81 of his followers the same day.

The province, under General Miguel Malvar, was also among the earliest to join the Philippine Revolution. The Revolutionary Government took control over the province on August 15, 1898.

=== American colonial era ===
The Americans then came and annexed the Philippines. A civil government was established in the province on March 12, 1901, and Lucena was made the provincial capital.

During the pacification of the archipelago by the Americans, insurrections were commonplace in what was then Tayabas. Insurgents from neighboring provinces of Laguna and Batangas often use Tayabas as their base of operations as well as their source of supplies. An insurgent government, with connections to Gen. Malvar and Pedro Caballes was even said to be based in Infanta. This has led the American in charge, Brigadier-General J.F. Bell to decide to return to Tayabas with a larger contingent. Bell acknowledged the importance of the ports of Tayabas as sources of supplies to the insurrection such that he believed that closing all the ports in the province might convince the leaders of the resistance to surrender.

Tayabas province in 1918

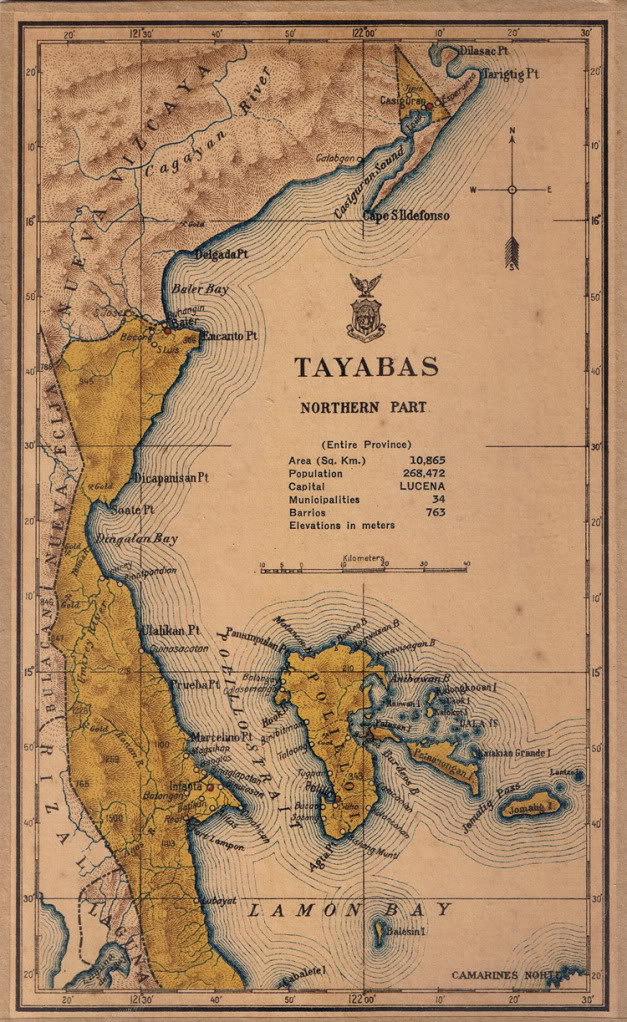
Northern portion

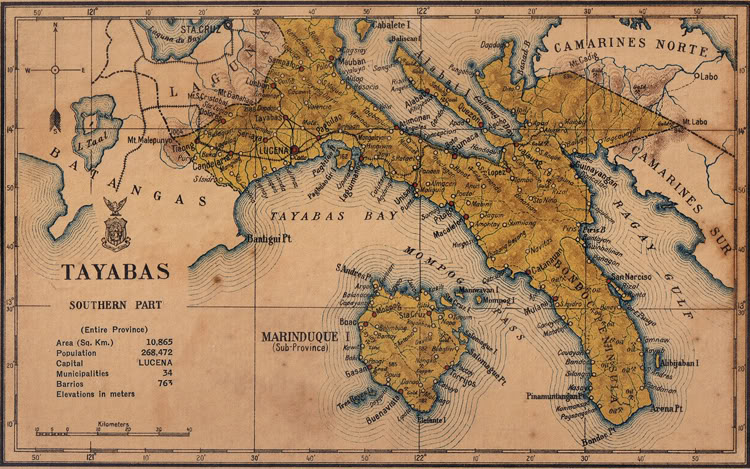
Southern portion

In 1902, the district of El Principe was transferred from the jurisdiction of Nueva Ecija to Tayabas. In the same year, Marinduque became part of Tayabas province by virtue of Act 499 enacted by the Philippine Commission. However, by 1920, Act 2280 was passed by the Philippine Congress, reestablishing Marinduque as a separate province. The present areas of north Aurora which is part of the modern Dilasag and area of modern Casiguran were transferred from the authority of Nueva Vizcaya to Tayabas in 1905. In 1918, the area of modern Aurora north of Baler was transferred to the authority of Nueva Vizcaya, but returned to Tayabas in 1921 and in 1942, the entire present-day territory of Aurora was annexed from Tayabas to Nueva Ecija, the municipality of Infanta (including the present-day municipalities of General Nakar and Real) to Laguna and abolished the province of Marinduque and re-annexed its municipalities to Tayabas, and returned to Tayabas in 1945 and re-established Marindique as an independent province.

Because of the distance between Tayabas and Bicol and the growing population, Tayabas came under the jurisdiction of the Diocese of Lipa in 1910.

=== Japanese occupation ===
Japanese occupation of the province during World War II began on December 23, 1941, when the Japanese Imperial Army landed in Atimonan. The General Headquarters of the Philippine Commonwealth Army and Philippine Constabulary was stationed in Tayabas from January 3, 1942, to June 30, 1946, are military operates against the Japanese Occupation. The occupation witnessed the brutal murders of prominent sons of Tayabas. April 4, 1945 was the day the province was liberated as the combined Filipino and American army forces reached Lucena.

=== Philippine independence ===
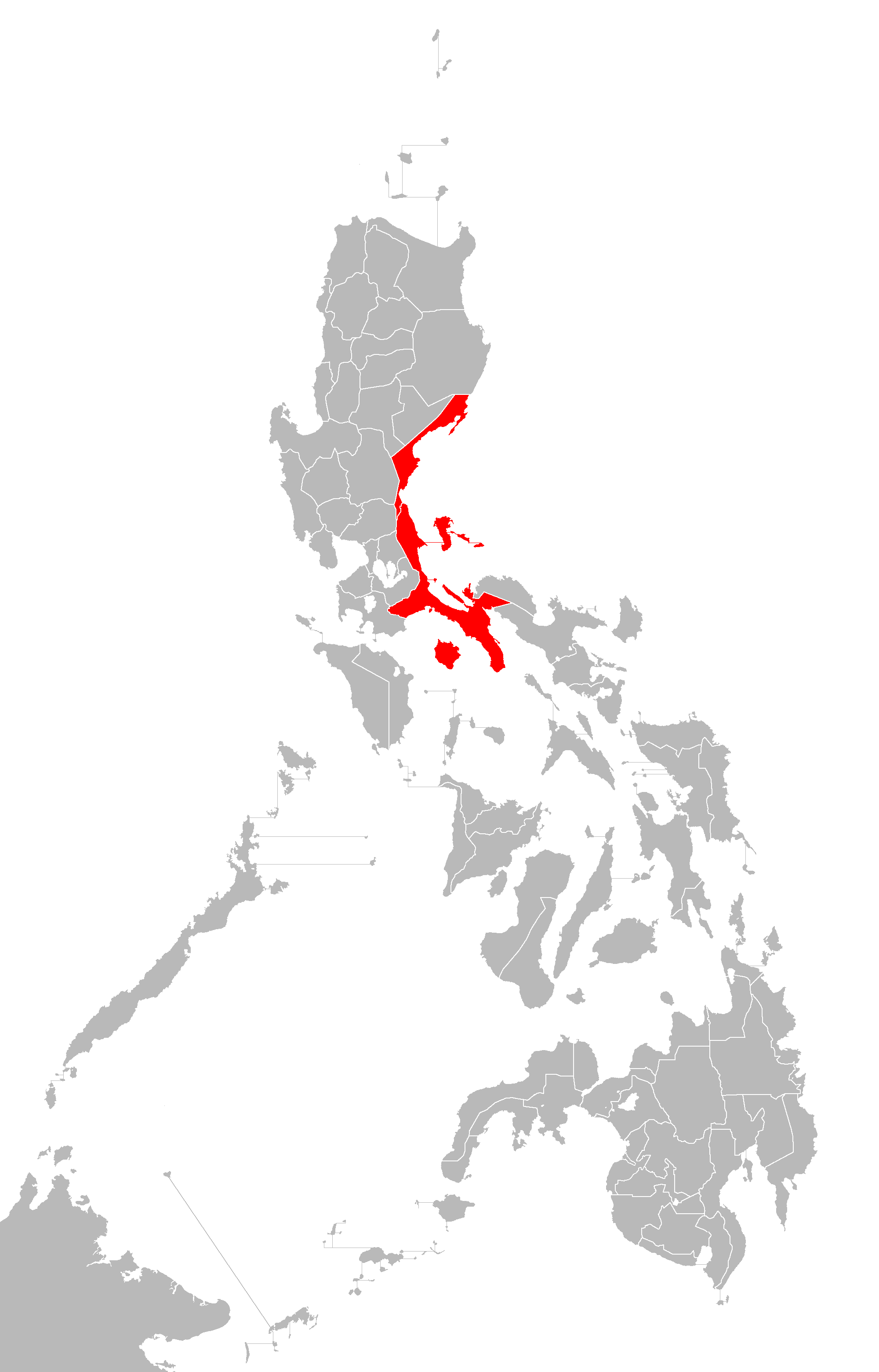
Map of Tayabas from 1902.

==== Name change from Tayabas to Quezon ====
After the war, on September 7, 1946, Republic Act No. 14 changed the name Tayabas to Quezon, in honor of Manuel L. Quezon, the Commonwealth president who hailed from Baler, which was one of the province's towns; he was elected governor of Tayabas in 1906 and assemblyman of the 1st district of Tayabas in 1907.

==== Rise of the coconut industry ====
Even before the Philippines gained its independence, the province had already depended heavily on coconuts. This history can clearly be seen through the opulent houses built in the town of Sariaya during this period. Coconuts served as the main source of income for the landed class of Sariaya and this allowed them to build the ancestral houses that we see today. This has led some companies like Peter Paul to establish its presence in Candelaria to manufacture products like desiccated coconut. As early as this period.

==== Establishment of the Province of Aurora ====
In June 1951, the northern part of Quezon (specifically, the towns of Baler, Casiguran, Dilasag, Dingalan, Dinalongan, Dipaculao, Maria Aurora and San Luis) was made into the sub-province of Aurora; during that time, only Baler, Casiguran, Dipaculao, and Maria Aurora existed yet, wherein the 2 latter towns were separated from Baler. Aurora was the name of the president's wife, Aurora Quezon, who was also born and grew up in Baler. Aurora was finally separated from Quezon as an independent province in 1979. One obvious reason for creating Aurora is due to the area's isolation from the rest of Quezon: there are no direct links to the rest of the province and much of the terrain is mountainous and heavily forested, which makes the area relatively isolated, and its distance from Quezon's capital Lucena. Upon the issuance of Executive Order No. 103, dated May 17, 2002, by President Gloria Macapagal Arroyo, the province of Aurora was moved to Central Luzon (Region III), geographical location of the province; the remaining areas of Quezon and other provinces of Southern Tagalog divided into Calabarzon and Mimaropa, and Southern Tagalog was limited to being a cultural-geographic region. Aurora's total separation from Quezon and transfer to Central Luzon were the fulfillment of the wishes and prayers of the residents of the original municipalities of Baler and Casiguran to be truly independent from Quezon for the first time and to reform the original La Pampanga since the Spanish occupation. Many residents and government leaders of Aurora objected to the change, as Aurora maintains strong historical and cultural connections to the rest of Southern Tagalog, particularly Quezon, thus also of the memory of Manuel L. Quezon, and with that, Aurora residents self-identified with Quezon; but Aurora's transfer to Central Luzon means that geographically, the province is more accessible by land from Nueva Ecija and of course, San Fernando, Pampanga, the regional capital of Central Luzon.

==== Martial law era ====
Quezon was not spared the social and economic turmoil during the Dictatorship of Ferdinand Marcos, including his 1971 suspension of the writ of habeas corpus, his 1972 declaration of martial law, and his continued hold on power from the lifting of martial law in 1981 until his ouster under the People Power Revolution of 1986. One major event that took place during this period was the Guinayangan massacre of February 1, 1981, in which Military elements opened fire on a group of about coconut farmers who were marching towards the Guinayangan plaza air to protest the coco levy fund scam. Two people were killed and 27 were wounded.

Among the Quezon citizens who were victims of forced disappearances during the Marcos dictatorship were human rights worker Albert Enriquez of Lucena, who documented military abuses as a volunteer for Task Force Detainees of the Philippines; and activist Ramon Jasul who founded the Bagong Kabataan ng Lukban (New Youth of Lucban) in his hometown. Enriquez was abducted by armed men on Aug. 29, 1985, while Jasul was abducted in Makati as part of the Southern Tagalog 10 incident of late July 1977. Neither were ever seen again, and both were eventually honored by having their names engraved on the wall of remembrance at the Philippines' Bantayog ng mga Bayani.

=== Contemporary ===
==== Quezon–Camarines Norte boundary dispute ====
In 1989, the province of Quezon, represented by Governor Hjalmar Quintana, was involved in a boundary dispute with the province of Camarines Norte, represented by Roy Padilla, over 9 barangays of over 8,000 hectares (20,000 acres) at their border. These barangays are Kagtalaba, Plaridel, Kabuluan, Don Tomas, Guitol, Tabugon, Maualawin, Patag Ibaba and Patag Iraya. The boundary dispute originated from Act 2711 or the Revised Administrative Code which was enacted in 1917. Section 42 of Act 2711 defines the Tayabas-Camarines Norte boundary as:

Camarines Norte and Tayabas boundary. – The boundary separating the Province of Camarines Norte from the Province of Tayabas begins at a point on the eastern shore of Basiad Bay and extends to a peak known as Mount Cadig in such manner as to bring the territory of the barrio of Basiad entirely within the municipality of Capalonga, in Camarines Norte, and to exclude the same from the territory of Calauag, in Tayabas. From Mount Cadig it extends along the crest of a mountain range, a distance of 50 kilometers, more or less, to a peak known as Mount Labo; thence in a southwesterly direction, a distance of 25 kilometers, more or less, to a prominent stone monument at the source or headwaters of the Pasay River, thence along the meandering course of said river in a southerly direction, a distance of 1½ kilometers, more or less, to the Gulf of Ragay.

In 1922, the then chief of the Executive Bureau, acted upon the authority of the secretary of the interior. This ruling by the then chief was never implemented even with repeated efforts of the provincial government of Camarines Norte and the secretary of the interior. The chief delineated the border as follows:

Starting from the peak of Mt. Labo as a common corner between the provinces of Tayabas, Camarines Sur and Camarines Norte thence a straight line is drawn to the peak of Mt. Cadig; thence a straight line is drawn to the point of intersection of the inter-provincial road between Camarines Norte and Tayabas with the Tabugon River; thence, following the course of the river to its mouth at Basiad Bay.

In the legal dispute, Quezon raised two points of contention. The first is that Act 2711 already delineated the boundaries of the province. The second is that the Chief of the Executive Bureau had no power nor authority to change the boundaries of the province. Regarding the first issue, the court stated that it is true that Act 2711 delineated the boundary but it did not delineate the entirety of the boundary. The point on the eastern shore of Basiad Bay was never specifically located, thus, needing further delineation. On the second issue, the court stated that the Chief did not alter the borders in any way. The Chief worked with the requirement that the point be on the eastern shore of Basiad Bay. He was also acting on the consideration of Act 2809, the Act establishing Camarines Norte, which states that Camarines Norte be established with the borders it had before merging with Camarines Sur. The court then ruled in favor of Camarines Norte and ordered the provincial government of Quezon to transfer all its authority and jurisdiction to the former.

By 2001, the Provincial Government of Quezon, this time represented by Governor Eduardo Rodriguez, and the Provincial Government of Camarines Norte, as represented by Governor Roy Padilla, went back to court. Even with the judgment on the 1989 case being executory by 1990, the provincial government of Quezon did not abide by the court's ruling. In 1991, a Department of Environment and Natural Resources (DENR) technical team conducted a survey of the area and erected a monument marker to delineate the boundary of the area. However, by October 1991, Quezon Governor Eduardo Rodriguez and Calauag Mayor Julio Lim had caused the removal of the marker. Throughout the proceedings, several government agencies including the Department of Budget and Management, Comelec, as well as the Philippine Statistics Authority recognized the jurisdiction of the town of Santa Elena, Camarines Norte over the 9 barangays. In 2000, Judge Regino held Governor Rodriguez and Mayor Lim guilty of contempt, with a maximum imprisonment of 6 months as well as a fine of ₱1,000 (equivalent to ₱2,186 in 2021) for the erection of a new boundary marker.

==== Failed proposal to divide Quezon ====
In 2007, Republic Act No. 9495 proposed to further divide Quezon into Quezon del Norte and Quezon del Sur. Quezon del Norte was to be composed of the first and second congressional districts of the province (Burdeos, General Nakar, Infanta, Jomalig, Lucban, Mauban, Pagbilao, Panukulan, Patnanungan, Polilio, Real, Sampaloc, Tayabas, Candelaria, Dolores, San Antonio, Sariaya, Tiaong and Lucena), with Lucena as its capital. Quezon del Sur, with its capital at Gumaca, would have been composed of the third and fourth congressional districts (Agdangan, Buenavista, Catanauan, General Luna, Macalelon, Mulanay, Padre Burgos, Pitogo, San Andres, San Francisco, San Narciso, Unisan, Alabat, Atimonan, Calauag, Guinayangan, Gumaca, Lopez, Perez, Plaridel, Quezon and Tagkawayan). The act lapsed into law without the signature of President Gloria Macapagal Arroyo on September 7, 2007.

As required by law, the COMELEC held a plebiscite on December 13, 2008, 60 days after the law took effect. The majority of the votes cast overwhelmingly rejected the division, and therefore the split did not push through.

==== Tayabas cityhood ====
The municipality of Tayabas became a component city by virtue of Republic Act No. 9398 which sought to convert the municipality into a city. The law was ratified on July 14, 2007. However, cityhood status was lost twice in the years 2008 and 2010 after the LCP questioned the validity of the cityhood law. The cityhood status was reaffirmed after the court finalized its ruling on February 15, 2011 which declared the cityhood law constitutional.

==== Administrative Classification and Provincial Resource Integration ====
Pursuant to the Department of the Interior and Local Government (DILG) Certification dated May 13, 2026, which formally affirms that the City of Lucena retains its status as a component city of the Province of Quezon, both the municipality's total population count and land area parameters are legally integrated and accounted for in the official computation of the province's revenue shares and resource allocations.

== Geography ==
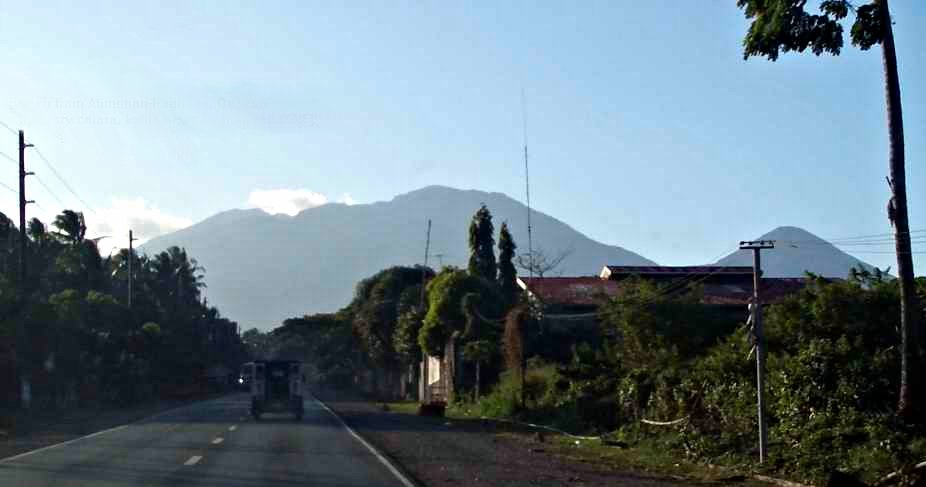
Mount Banahaw seen from the Atimonan-Pagbilao border

=== Physical characteristics ===
Quezon, east and south of Metro Manila, is the 8th largest province in the Philippines having an area of 8,989.39 square kilometers (3,470.82 sq mi). It is the largest province of Calabarzon, comprising 879,660 hectares (2,173,700 acres) or 52.13% of the total land area of the region. Of this area, 513,618 hectares (1,269,180 acres) or 57.14% is categorized as agricultural land. The northern part of the province is sandwiched between the Sierra Madre mountain range and the Philippine Sea. The southern part consists of the Tayabas Isthmus, which separates the Bicol Peninsula from the main part of Luzon Island, and the Bondoc Peninsula which lies between Tayabas Bay and Ragay Gulf. Because of this, the majority of towns in the province have access to the sea. The province is bounded by the provinces of Aurora, Bulacan, Rizal, Laguna, Batangas, Camarines Sur and Camarines Norte. It is bounded to the east by the Pacific Ocean and to the south by Tayabas Bay. The province is said to be characterized by a rugged terrain with patches of plains, valleys and swamps.

The major islands of Quezon are Alabat Island and Polillo Islands. Mount Banahaw, an active volcano, is the highest peak at 2,169 meters (7,116 ft). It supplies geothermal power to the Mak-Ban Geothermal Power Plant.

The province has a total of 1,066.36 km (662.61 mi) of coastline and has several bays including Burdeos Bay, Lamon Bay, Calauag Bay, Lopez Bay, Ragay Gulf, Pagbilao Bay and Tayabas Bay. The Infanta Watershed has extensive and highly productive aquifers while Mauban and Atimonan have no significant groundwater. According to the DENR, in 2003, Quezon had 231,190 hectares (571,300 acres) of forest cover. However, due to rampant illegal logging as well as kaingin, these forests are constantly threatened.

=== Climate ===
Because of the sheer size of Quezon, different areas have different climate patterns. Most of the province falls under Type IV Climate which means that rains are evenly distributed throughout the year. Polillo, Infanta, and parts of Calauag fall under Type II climate which means that there are no dry seasons but there is a pronounced wet season from November to April. Parts of the western towns of Tiaong, San Antonio, Dolores, and Candelaria as well as the tip of Bondoc Peninsula including parts of Mulanay, San Francisco, San Narciso and San Andres fall under Type III climate. This means that there is a relatively dry season from November to April. Although these are the patterns observed, with climate change, these patterns have become more erratic. Typhoons have become stronger through the years, causing problems such as power outages, road blockages, landslides, flash floods and crop damages.

Administrative divisions and population of Tayabas in 1800s
Town	Tributes	Inhabitants
Tayabas	4,283.5	21,418
Lucban	2,829.5	14,147
Saryaya	1,722.5	8,614
Tiaon	692	3,460
Dolores	450	2,250
Mauban	1,323	6,615
Atimonan	1,176	5,880
Gumaca	1,848	9,240
Pagbilao	496	2,480
Pitogo	276	1,380
Macalelon	155	775
Catanauan	450	2,250
Mulanay	305	1,525
Obuyon	265	1,325
Calauag	63	315
Apad	63	315
Guinyangan	212	1,060
Total		83,049

In 1902, during the American period, Tayabas was divided as follows:

Administrative divisions and population of Tayabas in 1902
Town	Population
Alabat	4,516
Atimonan	11,203
Baler	2,417
Bondoc	1,330
Calauag	3,185
Casiguran	2,067
Catanauan	4,108
Guinayangan	3,870
Gumaca	5,234
Infanta	10,283
Lopez	8,549
Lucban	10,227
Lucena	9,375
Macalelon	4,759
Mauban	12,021
Mulanay	2,149
Pagbilao	6,085
Pitogo	3,454
Polillo	2,164
Sampaloc	1,263
San Narciso	2,501
Sariaya	12,453
Tayabas	14,740
Tiaong	9,527
Unisan	2,692
Total	150,262

== Demographics ==
Population census of Quezon

Year	Pop.	±% p.a.
1903	148,581	—
1918	206,037	+2.20%
1939	340,273	+2.42%
1948	393,894	+1.64%
1960	610,599	+3.72%
1970	825,859	+3.06%

Year	Pop.	±% p.a.
1975	933,566	+2.49%
1980	1,021,397	+1.81%
1990	1,221,831	+1.81%
1995	1,359,992	+2.03%
2000	1,482,955	+1.87%
2007	1,646,510	+1.45%

Year	Pop.	±% p.a.
2010	1,740,638	+2.04%
2015	1,856,582	+1.24%
2020	1,950,459	+1.04%
2024	1,980,338	+0.37%

(excluding Lucena)
Source: Philippine Statistics Authority

When the Census of the Philippine Islands was conducted in 1902 during the American era, Tayabas, excluding the subprovince of Marinduque, had a total population of 153,065. 2,803 were considered as wild, or part of the non-Christian tribes such as the Aetas while 150,262 people were considered as civilized. Of the civilized population, 75,774 were males while 74,488 were female. 287 were of mixed descent while the rest are categorized as "Brown".

Population by ethnicity (2020)
Ethnicity	Population
Tagalog	1,711,914 (88%)
Bisaya	95,344 (4.9%)
Bicolano	82,978 (4.27%)
Ilocano	8,015 (0.41%)
Dumagat	7,322 (0.38%)
Cebuano	6,653 (0.34%)
Hiligaynon	5,384 (0.28%)
Waray	5,002 (0.26%)
Others	22,827 (1.17%)
Not Reported	5 (0%)

Based on 2010 census of the household population in Quezon, 90.0 percent reported Tagalog as their ethnicity. The other 10.0 percent were reported as belonging to these ethnic groups: Bisaya/Binisaya (4.2 percent), Bikol/Bicol (3.6 percent), Cebuano (0.6 percent), Ilocano (0.2 percent), and others.

The population of Quezon in the 2024 census was 1,980,338 people, with a density of 220 inhabitants per square kilometre or 570 inhabitants per square mile.

The inhabitants are mostly Tagalogs. The population is concentrated in the flat south-central portion which includes Lucena City, Sariaya, and Candelaria. After World War II, Infanta and surrounding towns received migrants from Manila, Laguna, Rizal and Batangas. People from Marinduque and Romblon moved to the southern part of the Tayabas Isthmus and northern parts of the Bondoc Peninsula. Visayans from Panay, Negros, Cebu, Bohol, Siquijor, Eastern Visayas and Masbate moved to the southernmost towns of Bondoc Peninsula, particularly in San Francisco and San Andres (people from Romblon are also Visayans). Ilocanos from Ilocos Region, Cagayan Valley, Central Luzon and Cordillera Administrative Region migrated to the northernmost towns of General Nakar, Infanta and Real, and even to Tagkawayan. Bicolanos from Bicol Region migrated to the easternmost towns of Calauag and Tagkawayan.

Filipino Chinese also have a long history in Tayabas (modern Quezon, Aurora and Marinduque provinces). In 1939, the province ranked 5th among all provinces including Manila in terms of the concentration of Filipino Chinese. This ethnic group has a long history of being active in business and commerce as shown by the business chambers existent before. However, as the Chinese have intermarried with locals, these groups have dwindled in number.

Population of Filipino Chinese
Province	1903	1918	1939
Tayabas	479	1,274	4,069

The province used to be home to various Aeta tribes. Other terms used to call them include "Umag", "Ata", "Atid", and "Itim". The Aeta used to clear coconut plantations and other odd jobs in exchange for food or clothing. These people, though seen as uncivilized by some, have a very rich culture. Some forms of their art include body scarification. The Aeta cause wounds on their skin in various parts of their body including back, arms, legs, hands, calves and abdomen. They then irritate them during healing using fire, lime and other materials to form scars. They also bore holes in their septum and then proceeded to decorate it with a sliver of bamboo. The Aeta also have various musical instruments like the nose flute and the gurimbaw, a stringed instrument made of coconuts, fibers from lukmong vines and bamboo.

=== Languages ===
There are five indigenous languages in Quezon: the dominant Tagalog language, the Hatang Kayi language in the north, the Manide language in the east and a small portion in the north, the Umiray Dumaget language in the north and a small area in the center, the already-extinct Katabangan language, which used to be in the south, and the Inagta Alabat language on Alabat Island, which is classified as Critically Endangered, meaning the youngest speakers are grandparents and older and they speak the language partially and infrequently and hardly pass it on to their children and grandchildren anymore.

The province primarily speaks a Tagalog dialect called Tayabas Tagalog or Tayabasin. Tayabas Tagalog speakers are often considered among the most genuine speakers of Tagalog due to their use of traditional vocabulary and expressions that have been preserved over time. This dialect retains many linguistic features that are not as prevalent in the commonly spoken Tagalog in urban areas like Manila. In Tayabas Tagalog, speakers in rural areas often use a deeper and more traditional form of Tagalog compared to those in town centers. Most of the Tayabas dialectal terms are not found in the Filipino dictionary; if they are, they have a different meaning. Within the province, there are also variants of dialectal terms that may be peculiar to other towns. The standardization of Tagalog has affected the development of many regional dialects, including Tayabasin. Due to historical interactions, Tayabasin may include influences from other Philippine languages, as well as Spanish and English. The dialect is also known for distinctive expressions like hane, kawasa, ngani baya, mandin, and yano.

=== Religion ===
The majority of Quezon's inhabitants primarily practice Roman Catholicism, which overwhelmingly accounts for 91.7% or more than nine out of ten of the entire population of the province, while at the City of Lucena, Catholics account to 91.3% of the city's population. Quezon contributes to Catholic population as the sixteenth most Catholic province in the Philippines, with 1.9 million faithful, whilst the City of Lucena is the seventh most Catholic highly urbanized city in the Philippines, with more than 254,000 faithfuls. Catholic hierarchy in the province is subdivided by two Dioceses of Lucena, and Gumaca with the latter born out of the former in 1984 and Catholic Prelate of Infanta was established on 25 April 1950, a month after Lucena Diocese was established. The prelature of Infanta is shared with Aurora, being a former part and forerunner of Quezon. Among other Christian denominations like Philippine Independent Church, Iglesia ni Cristo shares a smaller size of the percentage. Most non-Christians practice Islam, Indigenous Philippine folk religions, animism, or atheism.

== Government ==
=== Provincial Government ===
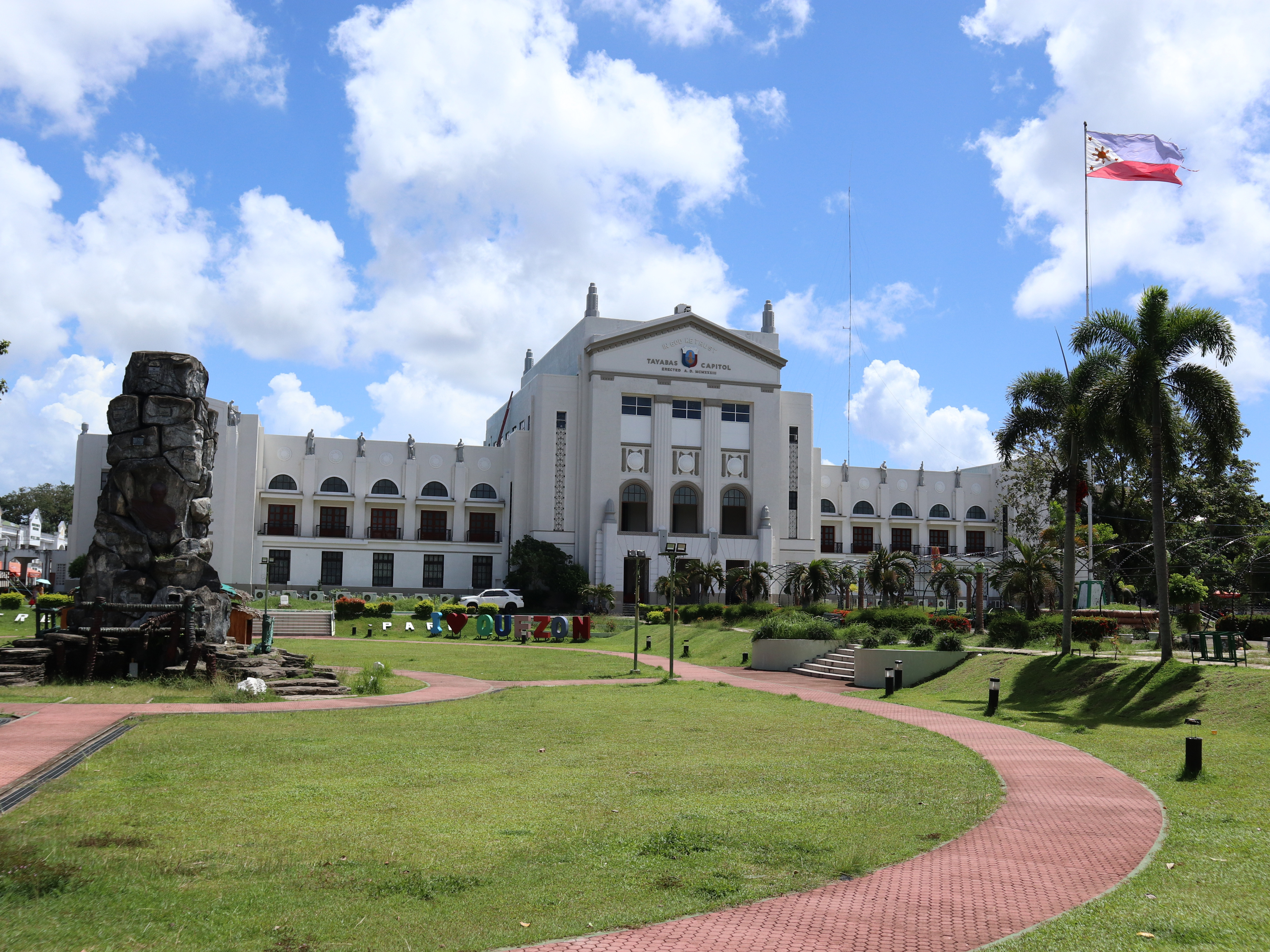
The Tayabas Capitol, officially Quezon Capitol in Lucena, the seat of the provincial government of Quezon, hosts the Quezon Provincial Legislature, Regional Trial Courts, and the Governor of Quezon.

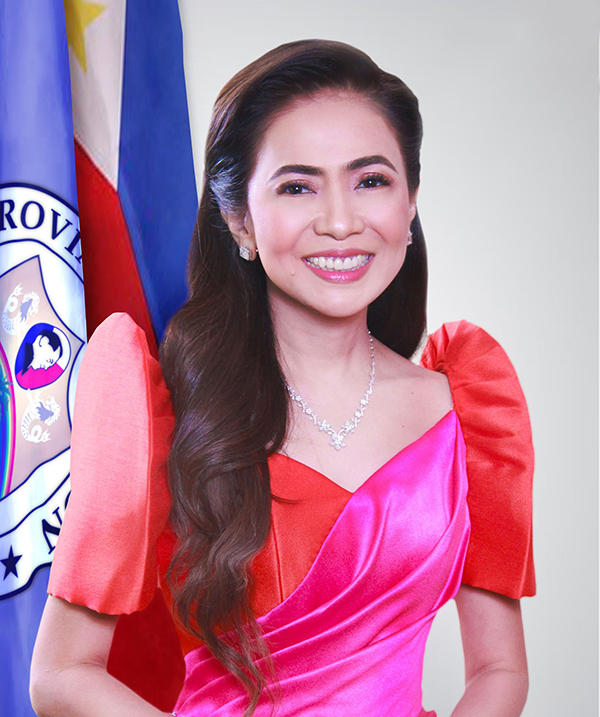
Governor
Angelina Tan

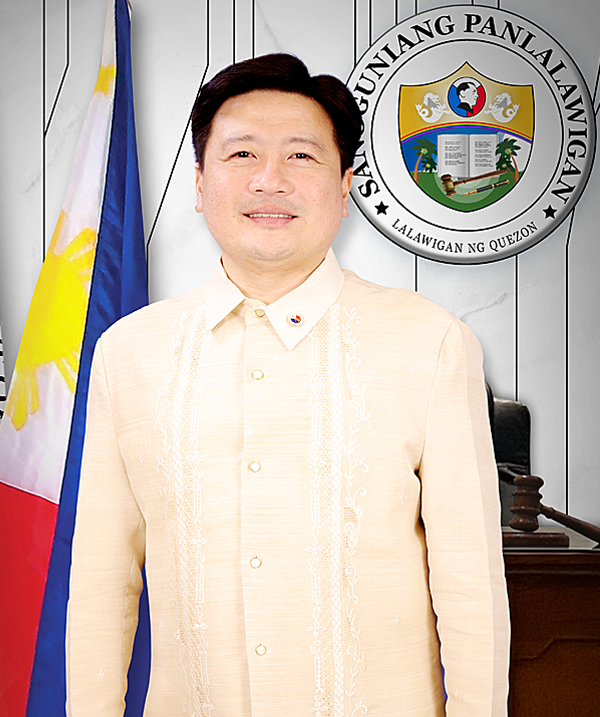
Vice Governor
Anacleto A. Alcala III

Quezon Provincial Legislature's Current Composition, by Party

The capital city of Quezon is Lucena, although the city is not governed by the Provincial Government. The Province is composed of three co-equal branches of the Government, with the Provincial Government overseeing the usual executive branch of the local government; The Quezon Provincial Board or the Sangguniang Panlalawigan is a unicameral legislature that exercises legislative branch of the province, composed of Board Members or "Bokal" which writes provincial ordinances and has the power of the purse in the province; judicial function in the province is part of the Fourth Judicial Region of the Regional Trial Courts of the Philippines, which hears all civil, criminal, and other judicial issuances and hears all appeals emanating from Metropolitan, Municipal, Municipal Circuit, and Municipal Trial Court in Cities.

==== Executive branch ====
The executive branch of the Provincial Government of Quezon consists of the governor and vice governor, which are both elected offices. They serve three-year terms and may be re-elected thrice or total of nine consecutive years.

Quezon's provincial agencies are under the governor's cabinet-level entities that are referred to by government officials as "office". These departments work in parallel with National-level government departments and agencies and work independently, in accordance to the Local Government Code of 1991.

Quezon government consists of the following:

- Governor: Angelina Tan
- Vice Governor: Anacleto A. Alcala III
- Provincial Administrator: Manuel M. Butardo
- Provincial Accountant: Mary Grace Gordula
- Provincial Agriculturist: Ana Clarissa S. Mariano, DVSM
- Provincial Assessor: Melojean M. Puache, J.D.
- Provincial Budget Officer: Diego M. Salas
- Provincial Disaster Risk Reduction Officer: Dr. Melchor P. Avenilla Jr.
- Provincial Engineer: Marichelle D. Ferrer
- Provincial Environment Officer: John Francis Luzano
- Provincial Gender and Development Officer: Sonia S. Leyson
- Provincial General Services Officer: Manuel M. Butardo
- Provincial Human Resource Management Officer: Rowell A. Napeñas
- Provincial Health Officer: Kristin Mae-Jean M. Villaseñor, RMT, MD, MPM
- Provincial Internal Auditor: Alberto S. Bay, Jr.
- Provincial Legal Officer: Julienne Therese V. Salvacion, J.D.
- Provincial Librarian: Ria Marelle A. Timbal
- Provincial Planning Coordinator: Engr. Russell C. Narte
- Provincial Social Welfare Officer: Sonia S. Leyson
- Provincial Tourism Officer: Nesler Louies C. Almagro
- Provincial Treasurer: Rosario Marilou M. Uy
- Provincial Veterinarian: Flomella Cacguicla
- Provincial Information Officer: Jun Lubid
- Provincial Information and Communications Technology Officer: Leney C. Laygo
- Provincial Mining Regulatory Officer: Engr. Rommel P. Sarmiento
- Provincial Public Employment Service Officer: Melojean M. Puache, J.D.
- Provincial Sports Development Officer: Aris A. Mercene

==== Legislative branch ====
The Quezon Provincial Board consists of a 13-member Board. The ten Members of the Assembly are subject to a term limit of three-year terms and may be re-elected thrice or for a total of nine consecutive years. The other three members are appointed by Liga ng mga Barangay (Barangay League) of Quezon, Philippine Councilors' League (of Quezon), and Sangguniang Kabataan (of Quezon).

The ex-officio presiding officer of the Provincial Board is also the concurrent Vice Governor of Quezon.

==== Judicial branch ====
Quezon's judicial system is administered by the Supreme Court of the Philippines. The province has eighteen Regional Trial Court (Second Level) branches, nine Municipal Circuit (First Level) Trial Courts, nineteen Municipal (First Level) Trial Courts, and three Municipal (First Level) Trial Court in Cities which all holds forty-nine judges within its jurisdiction.

Fourth Judicial Region Regional Trial Court Branches in Quezon
Municipality/City	Branch Numbers
Lucena	53, 54, 55, 56, 57, 58, 59, 60, 167, 168
Lucena (Family Court)	15
Gumaca	61, 62
Calauag	63
Mauban	64
Infanta	65
Catanauan	96
Sariaya (Family Court)	16

=== Local government ===
Quezon is further subdivided into local governments that manage public functions throughout the province. Like most provinces in the Philippines, Quezon is divided into municipalities, a component city, and a highly urbanized city covering the entire province. Cities and municipalities are further subdivided into barangays. School districts, which are independent of cities and municipalities and directly supervised by the Department of Education, handle public education. Many other functions, such as fire protection and water supply, are handled by municipalities and cities.

Congressional districts (also called legislative districts) also partially serve as a subdivision that groups municipalities and cities into a single unit, although this only covers the budgetary requirements of a particular district. District Engineering Offices (DEO) of the Department of Public Works and Highways of the National government follow the congressional districts, although may overlap with another congressional district for convenience purposes, and recognition of geographical limitations. One of which is Fourth District Engineering Office's boundary which starts at the boundary of Lucena and Pagbilao which eats up the First District's congressional jurisdiction in Pagbilao due to its distance from the First District.

==== Cities and municipal governments ====
Quezon comprises 39 municipalities and one component city (Tayabas), which are organized into four legislative districts and further subdivided into 1,209 barangays.

The capital, Lucena, is independent of the administrative and fiscal supervision of the province but is eligible to vote for provincial officials.

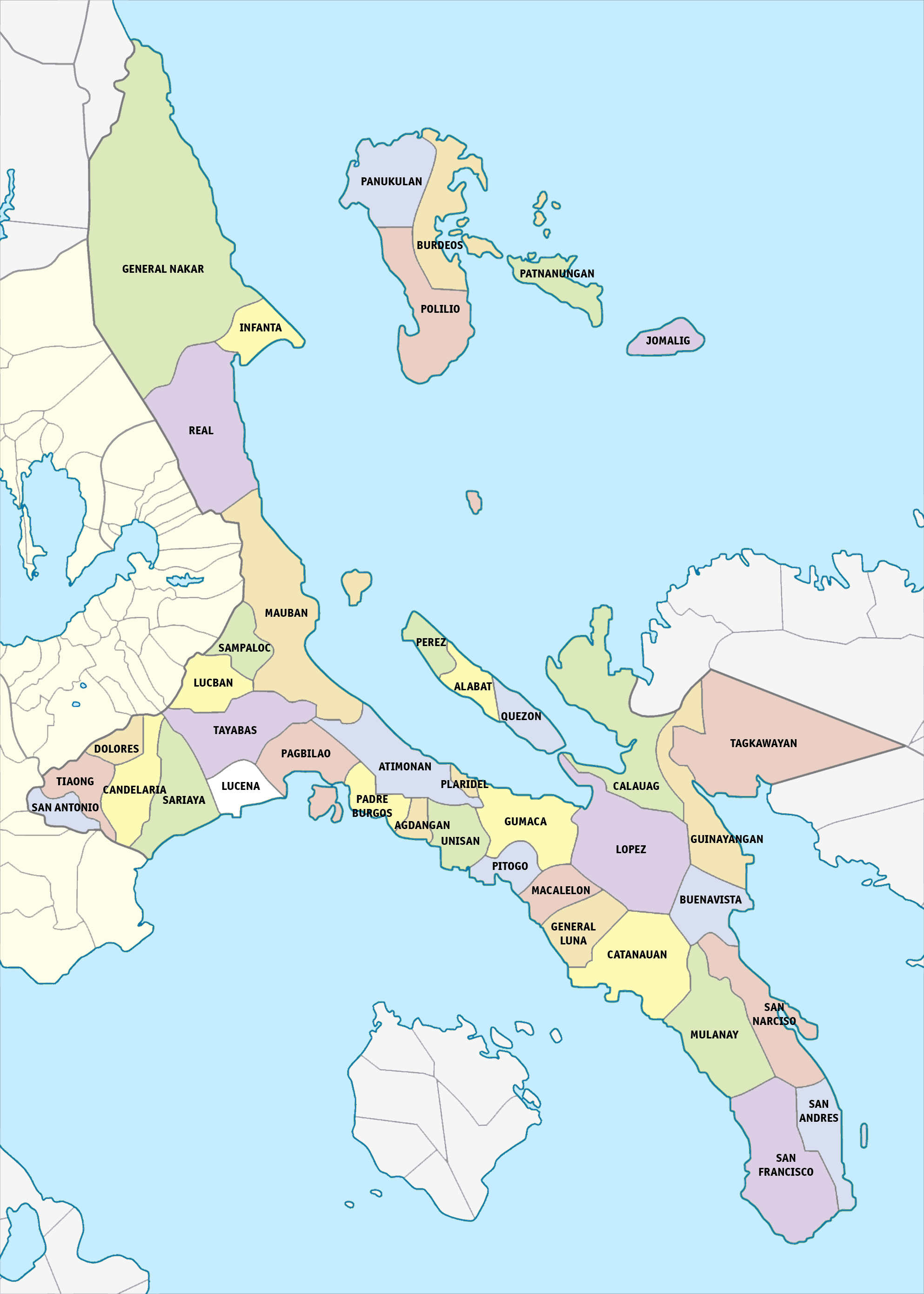
Political Map of Quezon

- † Provincial capital and highly urbanized city
- ∗ Component city
- Municipality

City or municipality		District	Category	Population			±% p.a.	Area		Density		Barangay	Coordinates^{[A]}
				(2020)		(2015)		km^{2}	sq mi	/km^{2}	/sq mi		
Agdangan		3rd	5th Class Municipality	0.7%	12,764	12,851	−0.13%	31.54	12.18	400	1,000	12	13°52′30″N 121°54′48″E
Alabat		4th	5th Class Municipality	0.8%	15,936	15,630	0.37%	57.61	22.24	280	730	19	14°06′04″N 122°00′44″E
Atimonan		4th	1st Class Municipality	3.3%	64,260	63,432	0.25%	239.66	92.53	270	700	42	14°00′02″N 121°55′17″E
Buenavista		3rd	4th Class Municipality	1.6%	31,160	30,047	0.69%	161.35	62.30	190	490	37	13°44′15″N 122°28′02″E
Burdeos		1st	4th Class Municipality	1.3%	24,644	26,760	−1.56%	199.82	77.15	120	310	14	14°50′24″N 121°58′12″E
Calauag		4th	1st Class Municipality	3.7%	71,809	73,139	−0.35%	324.71	125.37	220	570	81	13°57′30″N 122°17′14″E
Candelaria		2nd	1st Class Municipality	7.1%	137,881	117,434	3.10%	129.10	49.85	1,100	2,800	25	13°56′00″N 121°25′21″E
Catanauan		3rd	1st Class Municipality	3.7%	72,752	71,073	0.45%	253.07	97.71	290	750	46	13°35′34″N 122°19′20″E
Dolores		2nd	4th Class Municipality	1.7%	32,514	28,891	0.83%	62.60	24.17	520	1,300	16	14°00′57″N 121°24′04″E
General Luna		3rd	4th Class Municipality	1.3%	24,804	26,494	−1.25%	101.02	39.00	250	650	27	13°41′17″N 122°10′16″E
General Nakar		1st	1st Class Municipality	1.8%	34,225	29,705	2.73%	1,343.75	518.82	25	65	19	14°45′48″N 121°38′07″E
Guinayangan		4th	3rd Class Municipality	2.3%	44,045	45,155	−0.47%	214.12	82.67	210	540	54	13°53′51″N 122°27′14″E
Gumaca		4th	1st Class Municipality	3.7%	71,942	73,877	−0.50%	189.65	73.22	380	980	59	13.9215°N 122.1015°E
Infanta		1st	1st Class Municipality	3.9%	76,186	69,079	1.88%	342.76	132.34	220	570	36	14°44′45″N 121°38′50″E
Jomalig		1st	5th Class Municipality	0.4%	7,667	7,417	0.63%	53.93	20.82	140	360	5	14°41′49″N 122°19′47″E
Lopez		4th	1st Class Municipality	4.9%	94,657	95,167	−0.10%	355.38	137.21	270	700	95	13°52′57″N 122°15′40″E
Lucban		1st	2nd Class Municipality	2.7%	53,091	51,475	0.59%	130.46	50.37	410	1,100	32	14°06′52″N 121°33′17″E
Lucena	†	2nd	Highly urbanized city	—	278,924	266,248	0.89%	80.21	30.97	3,500	9,100	33	13°56′06″N 121°36′45″E
Macalelon		3rd	4th Class Municipality	1.4%	27,312	28,188	−0.60%	124.05	47.90	220	570	30	13°44′46″N 122°08′13″E
Mauban		1st	1st Class Municipality	3.6%	71,081	63,819	2.07%	415.98	160.61	170	440	40	14.1889°N 121.7310°E
Mulanay		3rd	1st Class Municipality	2.8%	55,576	53,123	0.86%	420.00	162.16	130	340	28	13°31′23″N 122°24′15″E
Padre Burgos		3rd	4th Class Municipality	1.2%	23,488	22,460	0.86%	69.10	26.68	340	880	22	13°55′00″N 121°48′58″E
Pagbilao		1st	1st Class Municipality	4.0%	78,700	75,023	0.92%	170.96	66.01	460	1,200	27	13°58′28″N 121°41′07″E
Panukulan		1st	4th Class Municipality	0.8%	16,376	13,546	3.68%	226.61	87.49	72	190	12	14°55′59″N 121°48′58″E
Patnanungan		1st	5th Class Municipality	0.8%	15,052	14,606	0.57%	139.20	53.75	110	280	6	14°45′19″N 122°13′01″E
Perez		4th	5th Class Municipality	0.7%	12,767	12,173	0.91%	57.46	22.19	220	570	14	14°11′38″N 121°55′33″E
Pitogo		3rd	4th Class Municipality	1.2%	22,798	23,019	−0.18%	73.39	28.34	310	800	39	13°46′59″N 122°05′19″E
Plaridel		4th	5th Class Municipality	0.5%	10,129	10,935	−1.45%	18.19	7.02	560	1,500	9	13°57′24″N 122°01′01″E
Polillo		1st	3rd Class Municipality	1.6%	31,908	30,582	0.81%	253.00	97.68	130	340	20	14°43′03″N 121°56′15″E
Quezon		4th	5th Class Municipality	0.8%	15,886	15,228	0.81%	71.22	27.50	220	570	24	14°00′22″N 122°11′03″E
Real		1st	1st Class Municipality	2.0%	38,678	35,979	1.39%	337.92	130.47	110	280	17	14°39′56″N 121°36′13″E
Sampaloc		1st	5th Class Municipality	0.7%	13,629	13,907	−0.38%	104.78	40.46	130	340	14	14°09′40″N 121°38′18″E
San Andres		3rd	4th Class Municipality	1.9%	37,454	35,780	0.87%	172.93	66.77	220	570	7	13°19′25″N 122°40′39″E
San Antonio		2nd	4th Class Municipality	1.8%	35,891	33,467	1.34%	60.99	23.55	590	1,500	20	13°53′45″N 121°17′36″E
San Francisco		3rd	2nd Class Municipality	3.2%	62,097	61,473	0.19%	303.96	117.36	200	520	16	13°20′49″N 122°31′12″E
San Narciso		3rd	3rd Class Municipality	2.6%	51,058	48,461	1.00%	263.58	101.77	190	490	24	13°33′56″N 122°33′59″E
Sariaya		2nd	1st Class Municipality	8.3%	161,868	148,980	1.59%	212.16	81.92	760	2,000	43	13°57′46″N 121°31′27″E
Tagkawayan		4th	1st Class Municipality	2.8%	54,003	51,832	0.78%	534.35	206.31	100	260	45	13°57′57″N 122°32′21″E
Tayabas	∗	1st	Component city	5.8%	112,658	99,779	2.34%	230.95	89.17	490	1,300	66	14°01′35″N 121°35′30″E
Tiaong		2nd	1st Class Municipality	5.4%	106,265	99,712	1.22%	168.38	65.01	630	1,600	31	13.9593°N 121.3228°E
Unisan		3rd	4th Class Municipality	1.3%	25,448	26,884	−1.04%	124.15	47.93	200	520	36	13°50′21″N 121°58′35″E
Total^{[B]}					1,950,459	1,856,582	0.94%	8,743.84	3,376.02	220	570	1,209	(see GeoGroup box)
1. Coordinates mark the town center, and are sortable by latitude.; 2. Total figures exclude the highly urbanized city of Lucena.

In the 1800s when Jean Mallat de Bassilan conducted a survey of the province, it only had 17 towns.

==== Schools, divisions, and state universities and colleges ====
There are 1032 public schools in Quezon. 818 schools are primary, while 214 are secondary schools. These are under monitoring and supervision of Department of Education's Division of Quezon, Lucena, and Tayabas, respectively.

The province is also the home of some educational institutions and universities. This includes Southern Luzon State University, Polytechnic University of the Philippines Lopez, Dalubhasaan ng Lungsod ng Lucena, and Quezon National Agriculture School operated by the national government, and of City of Lucena.

=== National representation ===
Current boundaries of legislative districts in Quezon

The province of Quezon sends 4 members to the House of Representatives, one of the nation's least-represented congressional delegations despite its large voting population and huge land area. Consequently, Quezon is also a member of Lingayen-Lucena Corridor, the largest voting bloc in the Philippines, demographically, where national elections are claimed to be won. The corridor comprises about 40% of the total voting population in the Philippines.

Quezon has yet to place a speaker of the House since its establishment and the last Senate president from Quezon was its namesake and inaugural holder, former Senate President, Manuel L. Quezon. He also became the first and only elected president who hails from Baler which was born at the time that the town was still part of Tayabas.

Although the Philippine Senate elects its senators At-large, Quezon was last represented in the Senate by its native until 30 June 1995 by Senator Wigberto Tañada, which hails from Gumaca and partially, by Senator Edgardo Angara until 30 June 2013, which hails from Baler which were also born at the time that the town is still part of Tayabas.

Quezon is represented in the Philippine House of Representatives in the 20th Congress by its House delegation, district representatives Mark Enverga (First) of Nationalist People's Coalition, David Suarez (Second) of Lakas, Reynante Arrogancia (Third) of Nationalist People's Coalition, and Keith Micah Tan (Fourth) of Nationalist People's Coalition.

== Economy ==
Poverty incidence of Quezon (%)

Source: Philippine Statistics Authority

Farming and fishing are the main sources of livelihood in the province. Commercial, industrial, and banking activities are mostly concentrated in the south-central part of the province.

=== Agro-industry ===
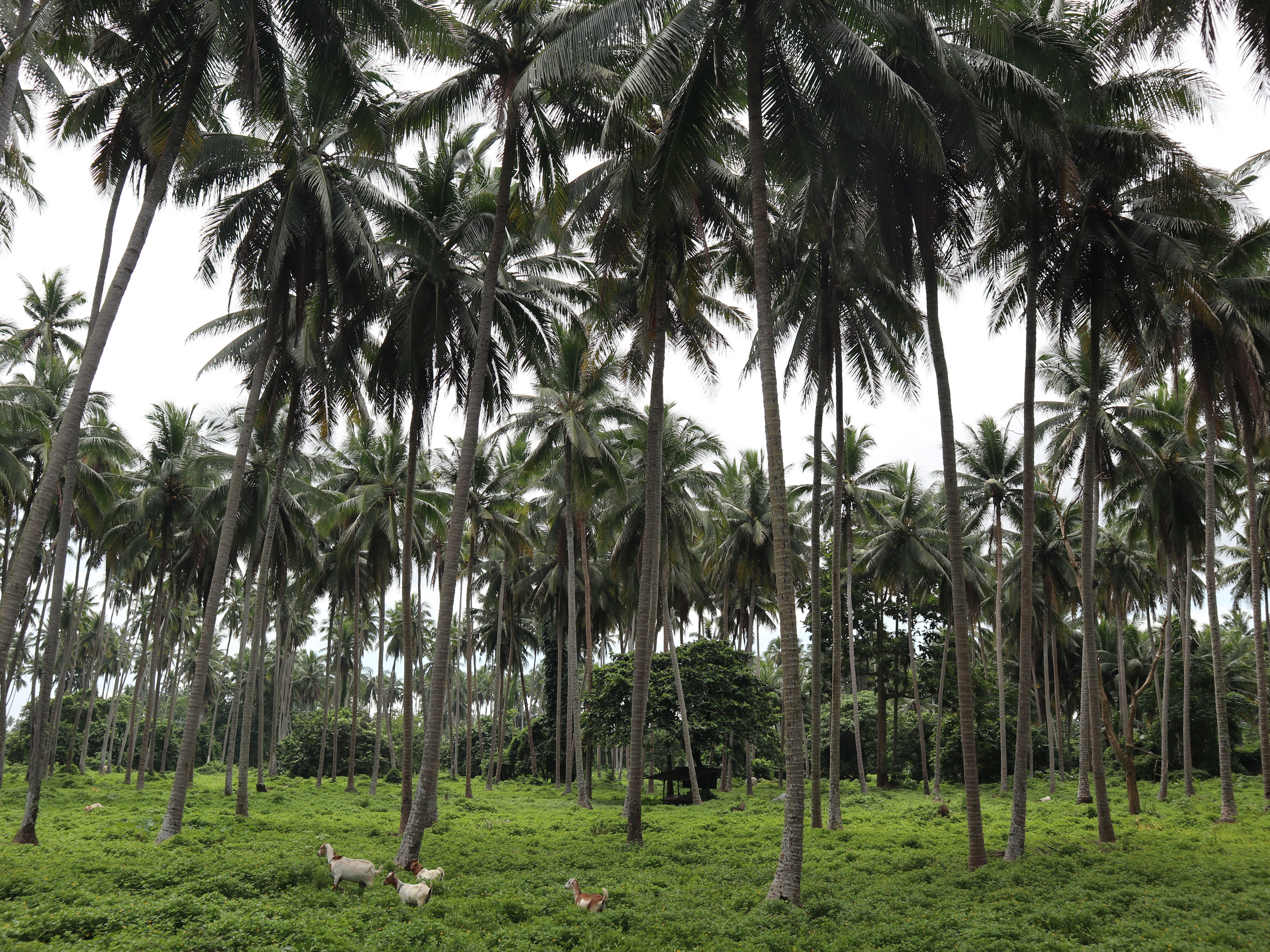
Coconut plantation at Villa Escudero, Tiaong

Quezon is called “Cocolandia”, with the Philippine Statistics Authority (PSA) confirming the province is the top coconut producer in Calabarzon and in the whole country. This stems from the fact that agricultural activities drive its economy. People mainly engage in farming and fishing operations.

Quezon has a total agricultural area of 4,167.6421 square meters (44,860.126 sq ft) representing 46.36% of the total provincial land area. The total area planted with coconuts covers 379,137.60 hectares (936,869.4 acres), making Quezon the province with the largest coconut production area in the Philippines. Also, Quezon is the top coconut producing province in terms of total coconut production in the country with 1,493,066.64 metric tons (1,469,485.93 long tons; 1,645,824.25 short tons) in the year 2020.

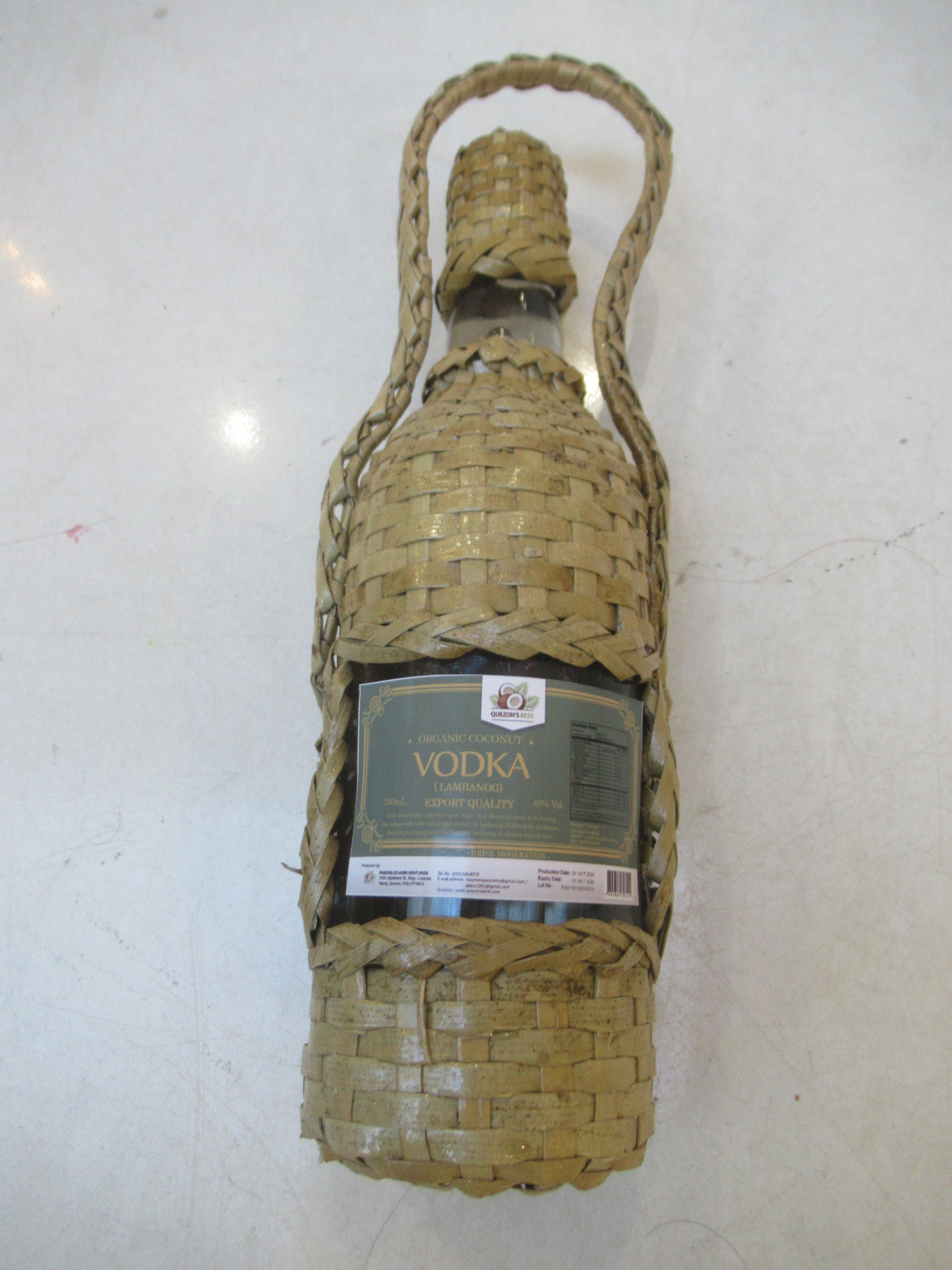
Tiaong's Lambanog

Quezon is the country's leading producer of coconut products such as desiccated coconut, virgin coconut oil, coconut juice, coconut oil, lambanog and copra. A large part of the province is covered in coconut plantations. Several large companies geared toward processing coconuts have factories in the province. This includes companies in Candelaria including Peter Paul Philippine Corporation, Primex Coco Products Inc., Pacific Royal Basic Foods, SuperStar Corporation, and Tongsan Industrial Development Corporation which are focused on processing desiccated coconut and other specialty coconut products. Other companies in Lucena like Tantuco Enterprises, and JNJ Oil Industries on the other hand are focused on producing coconut oil and other coconut oil based products like margarine, and lard. Because of the coconut industry, copra traders from provinces like Marinduque, Romblon, and Masbate regularly visit the province.

However, the coconut industry is faced with several threats from cocolisap to the coconut lumber trade. When cocolisap posed a huge threat to the coconut industry, the government had to act swiftly with countermeasures aimed at fighting the coconut scaling insect.

Aside from coconuts, Quezon is also the most important agricultural province among the provinces in Calabarzon in terms of producing staple food items such as rice and corn. The province supplies 200,000 metric tons (200,000 long tons; 220,000 short tons) of rice and corn annually or around 42% of the total rice and corn requirement of the region. Other major crops are rice, corn, banana, and coffee.

Predominant livestock in Quezon are cattle, carabao and swine due to the suitability of the land for grazing animals. Carabao is the most used draft animal in land preparation, as well as for hauling farm products and material inputs for farmers, although power tillers are available in the market. Horses are also utilized for hauling purposes. Cattle are primarily raised for meat production, while there is an emerging industry on dairy production. Swine and poultry production are also emerging industries, including egg production. Backyard raising of livestock and poultry is likewise dominant in many rural areas in the province, both for home consumption and as additional sources of household income.

=== Fishing ===
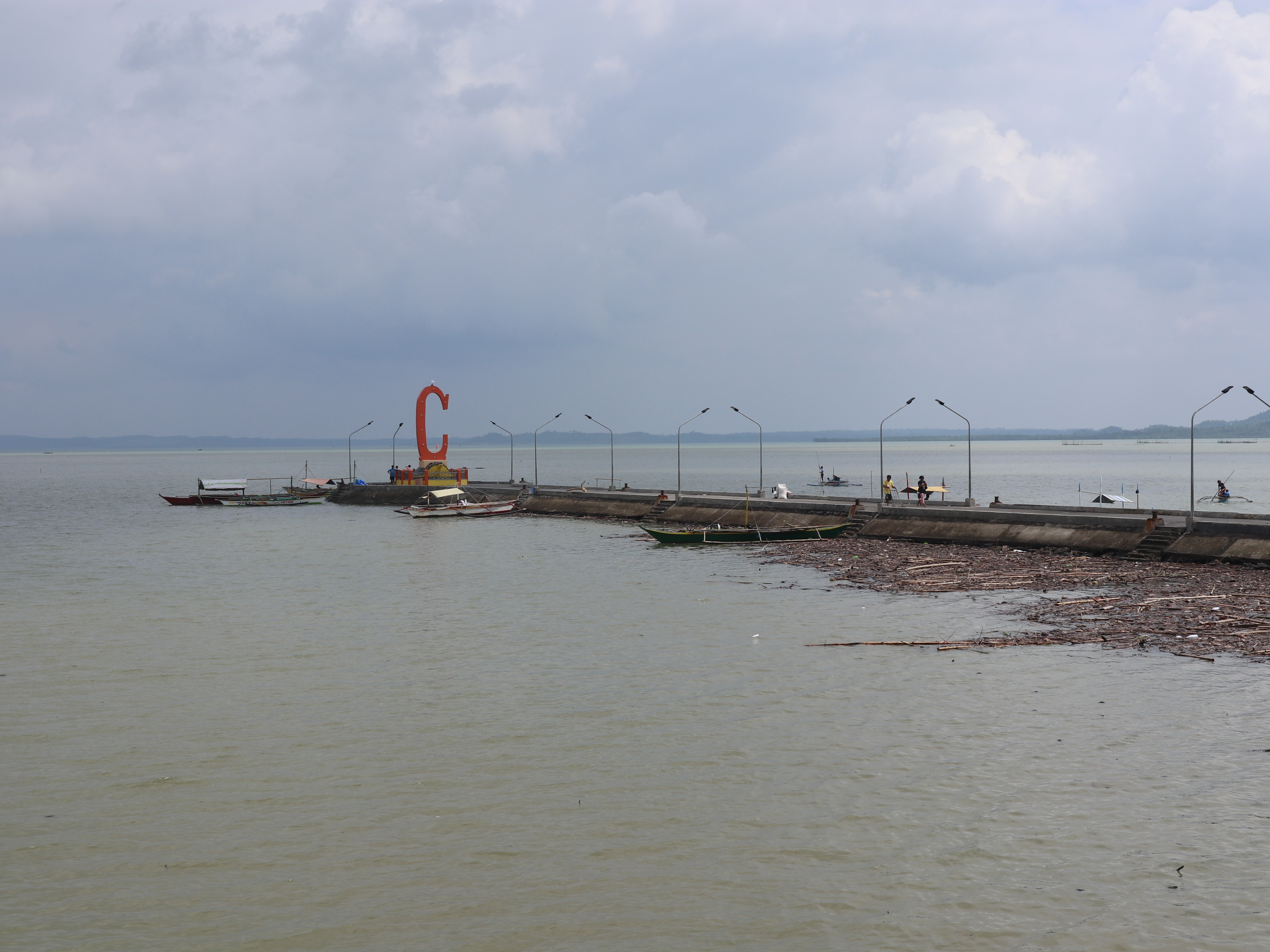
Calauag fish port

Because of its long coastline and the presence of numerous marshes and bays, fishing is also a large part of the province's economy. Quezon accounts for 33% or around 132,239 metric tons (130,150 long tons; 145,769 short tons) of fish produced in the region. Several fish port complexes exist in the province, including ports in Atimonan, Lucena, Infanta, Calauag, and Guinayangan. These ports serve as hubs for the trade of fish and other aquatic resources like round scad, anchovies, tuna, and groupers. The province has three fishing districts. The first is found in the northeast encompassing Lamon Bay. The southeast portion includes Ragay Gulf while the south central portion covers Tayabas Bay. Aside from fishing, aquaculture is also important in the coastal municipalities of the province. Bangus and prawns are among the most cultured species.

=== Forestry ===
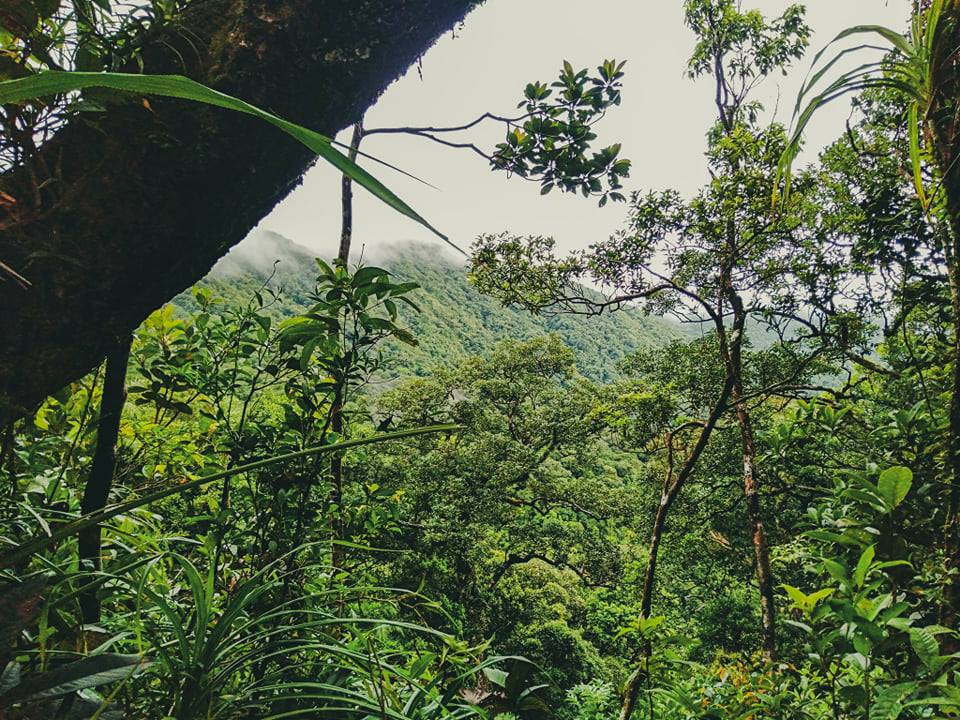
Forest at Mount Tabag, General Nakar

Due to its proximity to the southern fringes of the Sierra Mountain range. Northern Quezon has been a hotspot for illegal logging. Frequent raids in towns like Mauban often yield hardwood timber like Narra and Kamagong.

=== Commerce and banking ===
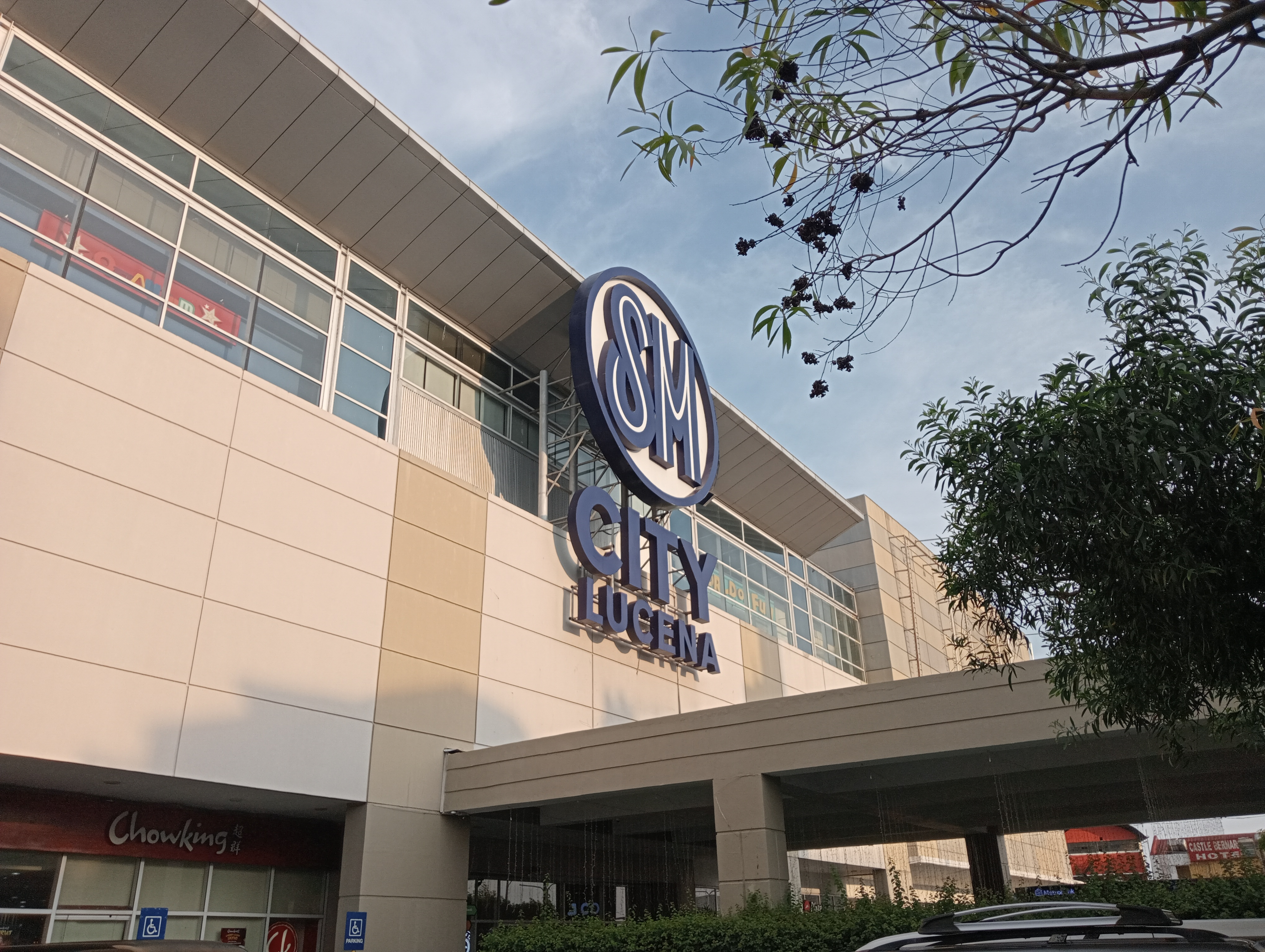
SM City Lucena

The capital city of Lucena is considered to be the economic center of the province. There are currently three malls in the province. Two of them are located in Lucena, namely: SM City Lucena and Pacific Mall Lucena. Citymall, located in Tiaong, is the third mall in the province. Major banks like BDO, Metrobank, Land Bank, BPI, PNB, RCBC, UnionBank, among other Manila-based banks are present in the western part of the province. BDO however made a move to establish a regional head office at Lucena due to the growing demand and economic importance of the province itself. On the other hand, namely QCRB, Rural Bank of Atimonan and Card Bank rural banks serve most if not all municipalities of the province.

Several rural banks were also established in Quezon namely Rural Bank of Dolores, United Rural Bank of Lopez, Rural Bank of Lucban, Rural Bank of General Luna, and Rural Bank of Sampaloc.

=== Agri-tourism ===
Another aspect pursued and promoted by the Provincial Government of Quezon is the development of agri-tourism sites and agricultural enterprises within its borders. These serve as additional sources of income for local farmers wanting to further increase their profits as well as provide livelihoods to rural women, youth, and other interested agricultural workers. The rural ambience in the province, its hospitable people, and its proximity to the urbanized areas in the region and to Metro Manila provide a ripe opportunity to further develop the province's agri-tourism potential. Already popping up all throughout the province are tourism attractions showcasing rural settings such as farm restaurants, organic farms, agricultural learning sites, pick-and-pay harvesting activities, among many others. Agri-tourism is seen to allow the local communities to share and invite people to come, see and experience the agricultural landscape and natural beauty of the province.

== Infrastructure ==
=== Transportation ===
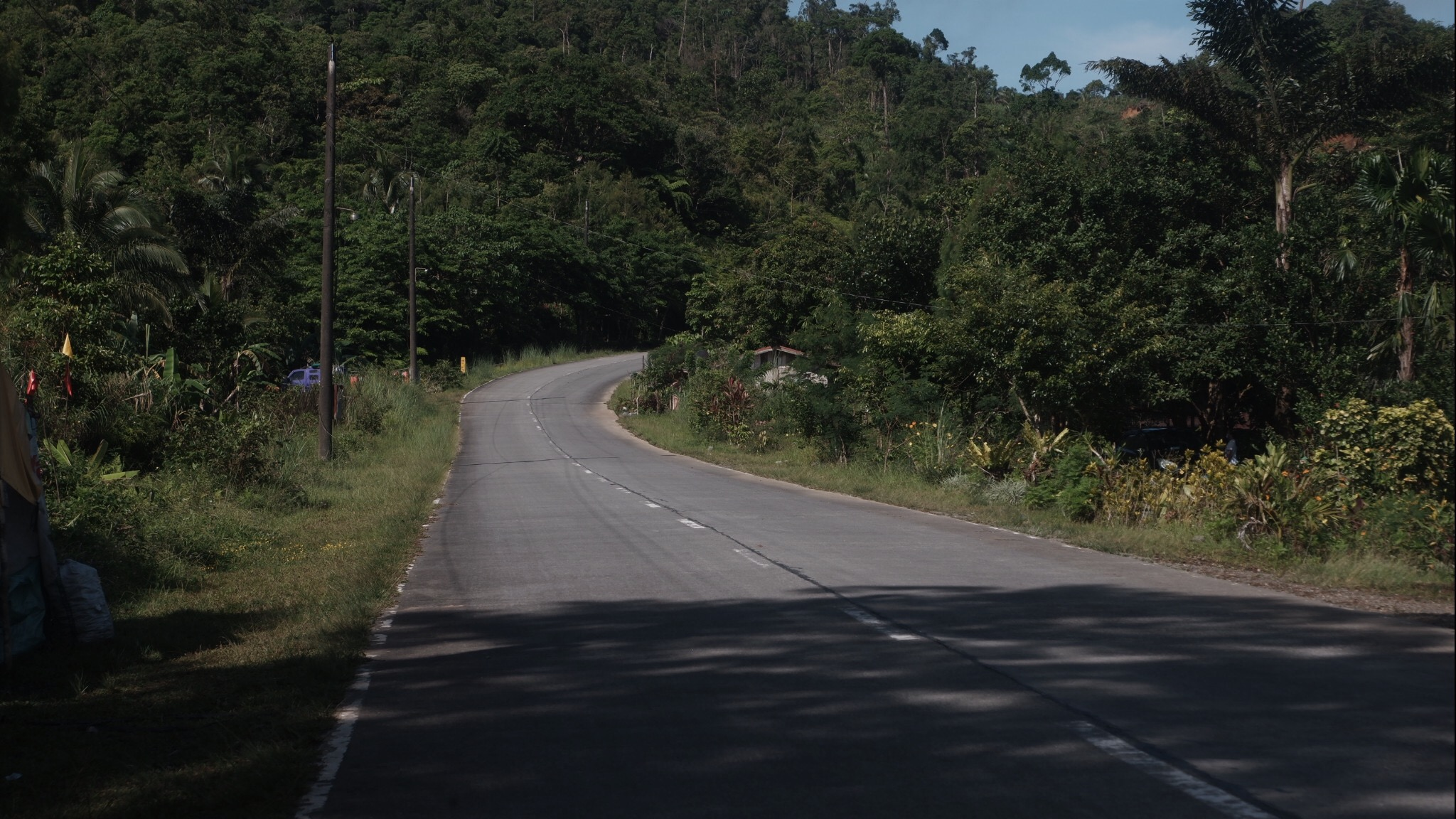
Portion of Marikina–Infanta Highway (also known as Marcos Highway or Marilaque Highway) in Infanta.

Quezon's transportation mainly includes jeepneys and tricycles. Transportation between town is usually served by jeepney, UV Express and buses.

Buses serve as the main mode of transportation to and from Metro Manila as well as nearby provinces. The province also hosts the Lucena Grand Terminal which is the central transportation hub of the province and connects the entire province as well as other provinces such as Batangas, Laguna, and regions of Bicol and the National Capital Region.

==== Bus lines ====
- Lucena Lines (Manila-Lucena)
- JAC Liner (Manila-Lucena)
- JAM Liner(Manila-Lucena)
- DLTBCo (Manila-Lucena, Bicol, Lucban, Sampaloc Quezon)
- MRR Transport ((Manila-Infanta)
- Raymond Transportation (Manila-Bicol via Calauag Terminal)
- Superlines Bus Incorporated (Manila-Bicol via Atimonan Terminal)
- A&B Liner (Manila-Calauag, Guinayangan, Tagkawayan, Santa Elena, Del Gallego via Lucena Grand Terminal)
- Barney Auto Lines (Manila-Lucena)
- Dela Rosa Transit (Manila-Lucena)
- Supreme Bus Transit (Batangas-Lucena)

==== Roads ====
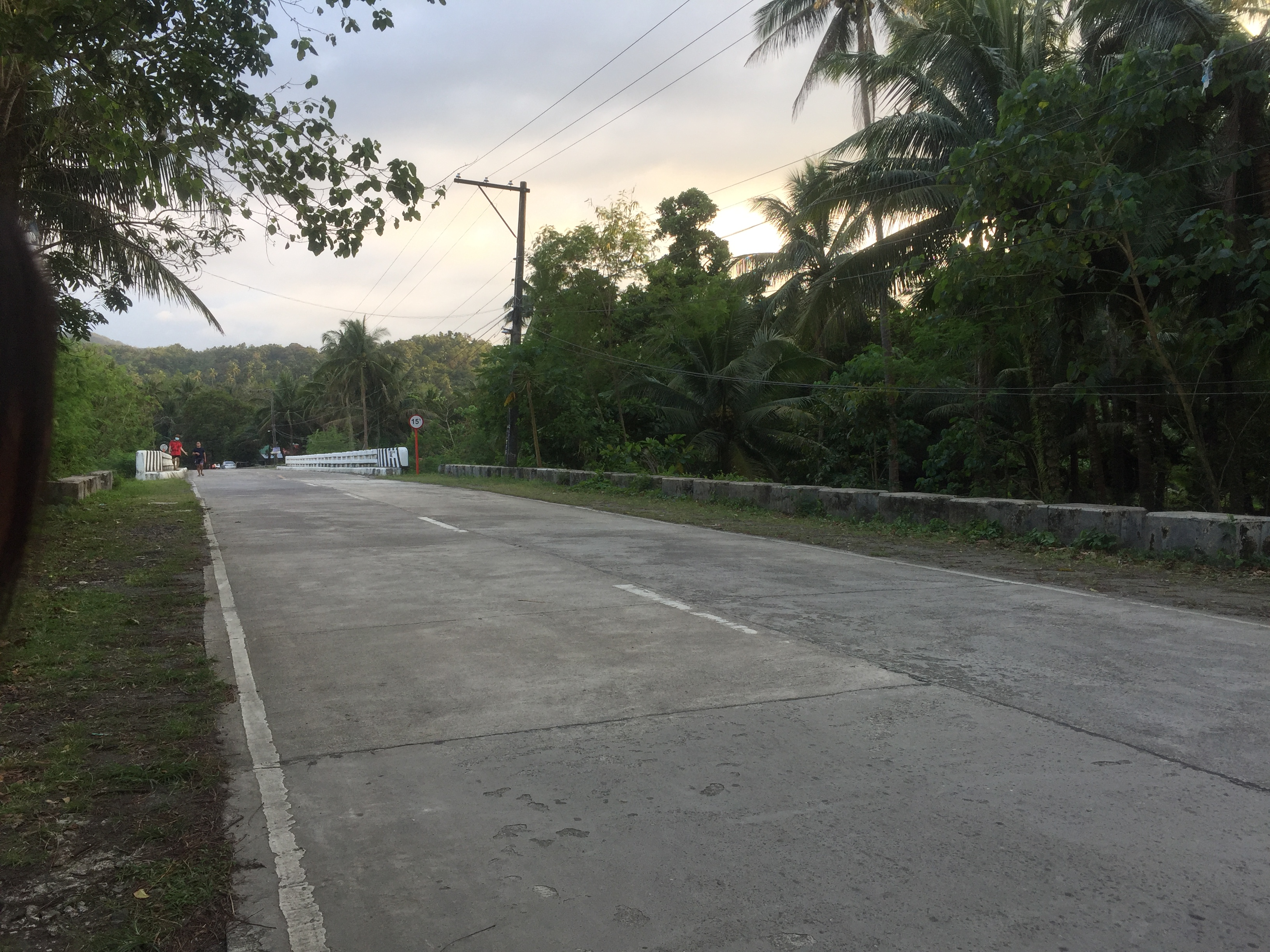
Portion of Famy-Real-Infanta Road (N601), in Real.

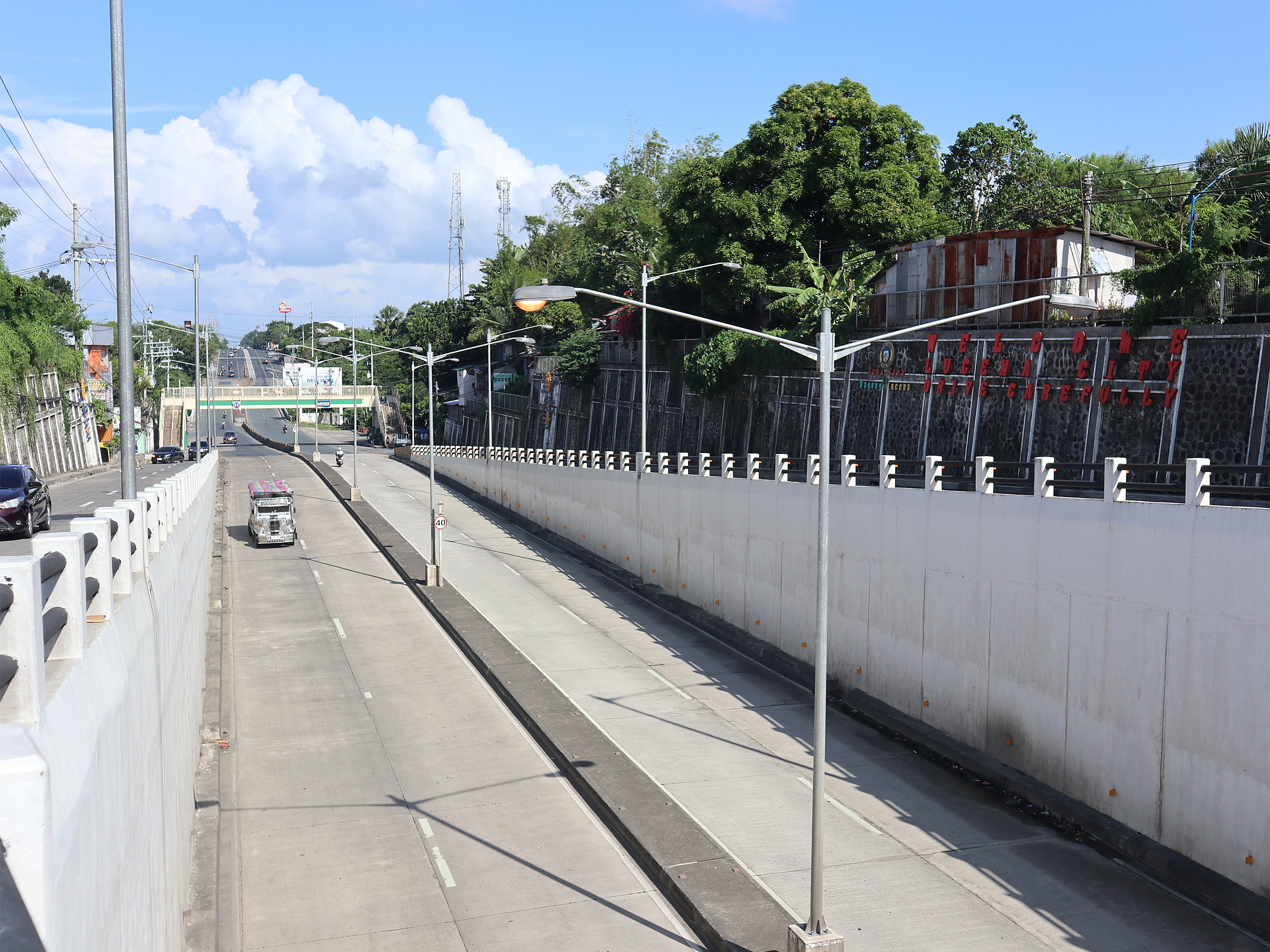
Lucena Diversion Road, a part of Pan-Philippine Highway (N1/AH26), in Lucena

Quezon has a total of 931 kilometers (578 mi) of national roads, mostly paved with concrete. Pan-Philippine Highway (N1/AH26), which comprises most of Manila South Road, and Quirino Highway (N68), the Quezon leg of Quirino Highway form the highway backbone network, and the secondary and tertiary roads interconnect most cities and municipalities, except for Infanta, Real, and General Nakar, whose highways used to access those municipalities interconnect with the national highway network in Laguna and Rizal or Manila East Road and Marilaque Highway. The provincial government maintains provincial roads which supplement the national roads.

In order to spur development in the province, several proposals have been made to expand the expressway network to Quezon. The South Luzon Expressway, which terminates at Santo Tomas, Batangas, will be extended to Barangay Mayao, Lucena with the construction of Toll Road 4 (SLEX TR-4) Three expressways being proposed for construction includes the Manila – Quezon Expressway (MQX), which will pass through Rizal and eastern Laguna, Quezon-Bicol Expressway (QuBEx), which will link between Lucena and San Fernando, Camarines Sur. and Toll Road 5 (SLEX TR-5) extending SLEX to Matnog, Sorsogon.

==== Railroads ====
The South Line of Philippine National Railway's passes through the different municipalities and cities of Quezon from the Central Station in Tutuban to Bicol. Currently, the Inter-Provincial Commuter line from Calamba to Lucena via San Pablo are operational and the rest are suspended indefinitely and are subject for modernization through North-South Commuter Railway Program.

==== Seaports ====
The Dalahican Port and Cotta Port in Lucena provide direct access to the neighboring island provinces of Marinduque, and Romblon. The Ports of Real and Infanta provide access to the islands of Polillo while the Atimonan and Gumaca ports provide access to the island of Alabat. The port in San Andres provides access to Masbate and Burias islands.

Most coastal municipalities have their own fishing and passenger ports for commercial and passenger transportation.

==== Airports ====
There are several airports that exist in Quezon. This includes the Lucena Airport, Pagbilao Grande Airport, Alabat Airport (Alabat Island) Jomalig Airport (Jomalig Island), and the Balesin (Tordesillas) Airport (Balesin Island). Due to its relative distance to Manila, economic viability or demand of the airports in Quezon are minuscule and used for military, private civil, and disaster response only. At present, only Balesin Airport is being used for Manila-Balesin flights.

=== Energy ===
Quezon electric utilities

===== Electric Generation =====
Quezon is home to several power plants that supply electricity to the Luzon grid. The Pagbilao Power Station is the first power plant in the province. Located at Isla Grande in Pagbilao, the 735 MW coal fueled power plant started operations as early as 1993. This power plant is currently being managed by Team Energy Corp. and is undergoing a 420 MW expansion. The Mauban Power Station is also a coal fueled power plant located in Barangay Cagsiay I. Managed by Quezon Power, the 420 MW power plant started operations in the year 2000. The third power plant, a 600 MW coal fueled plant, is currently in the planning stage and is going to be located in Barangay Villa Ibaba in the town of Atimonan. Renewable energy is also present in the province, with the operation of Labayat Upper Cascade Mini Hydroelectric Power Plant in Real, and Tibag Mini Hydroelectric Power Plant in Mauban which provides 2 and 5.6 Megawatts capacity. On November 2026, Alabat Wind Power Project started to contribute clean electricity to the province, which in total will contribute additional 64 Megawatts of electricity which will be sold entirely to Third and Fourth District towns and adjacent municipalities serviced by QUEZELCO I. Together, these provide a strong 2,323.8 MW contribution to the Luzon Grid as well as local jobs to the people as Quezon as well as addressing the energy needs of the province and the greater Luzon area.

====== Electric Transmission ======
The province plays a crucial role in the country's energy, as the Philippines' National Grid passes through the Tayabas Isthmus which separates Bicol Region, Visayas, and Mindanao from Luzon. Substations of the Grid are located within Tayabas, Pagbilao, and Lopez, and integrate directly with the Mindanao and Visayas Grids. Polillo Islands, meanwhile are the only part of the province not connected to the National Grid but are part of the Small Power Utilities Group of NAPOCOR.

====== Electric Distribution ======
There are three power distributors in the province, namely Meralco, Quezon I Electric Cooperative (QUEZELCO-I), and Quezon II Electric Cooperative (QUEZELCO-II). Meralco provides electricity to the province's second district as well as the adjacent towns of Pagbilao, Lucban, Sampaloc, Mauban and the City of Tayabas. QUEZELCO-I distributes power to the towns of the province's 3rd and 4th districts, as well as parts of Santa Elena, Camarines Norte which were former part of Calauag prior to the decision of the Supreme Court removing the jurisdiction of barangays from Calauag, as well as Del Gallego, Camarines Sur. QUEZELCO-II distributes power to the towns of the province's first district, except for the towns served by Meralco.

=== Water security ===
The Quezon Metropolitan Water District (QMWD), formerly known as the Lucena Pagbilao Tayabas Water District or LUPATA, serves the Metro Lucena area including Lucena City, Tayabas City, and Pagbilao. In 2020, Prime Water took over the administration and operation of QMWD. It draws its water largely from the May-it Spring although this source has prove inadequate to supply the area. Other towns are served by their own water districts. Some areas like the Infanta area are characterized by highly productive aquifers but other areas like Mauban and Atimonan have no significant water productivity.

Due to the pressures of a growing population, Quezon is one of the provinces from which the government plans to source part of the demand for water in Metro Manila. In General Nakar, construction is ongoing as of 2016 on a tunnel to divert water from the Sumag River to Angat Dam. The tunnel will link up with the Umiray-Angat Transbasin Project to provide water to Angat Dam. Aside from this, there are plans for the construction of the New Centennial Water Source Project – Kaliwa Lower Dam and the Kanan Dam in Northern Quezon for power generation and water supply of Metro Manila. The Sangguniang Panlalawigan of Quezon is against the construction of this project stating that it will not allow water from the Agos River, both on the left (kaliwa) and on the right (kanan) sides of the river. Locals fear that the construction of the project would cause massive destruction of forests, crops, animals and property in the REINA area (Real-Infanta-General Nakar). After Typhoon Vamco (Ulysses) severely hit the province (especially the northern part of Quezon) in late 2020, which made its landfall there three times and produced flooding in Daraitan in Tanay (Rizal province), General Nakar and Infanta, groups reiterated the call for opposition of Kaliwa Dam and instead pushed for the protection of the Sierra Madre Mountains.

== Culture ==
=== Festivals ===
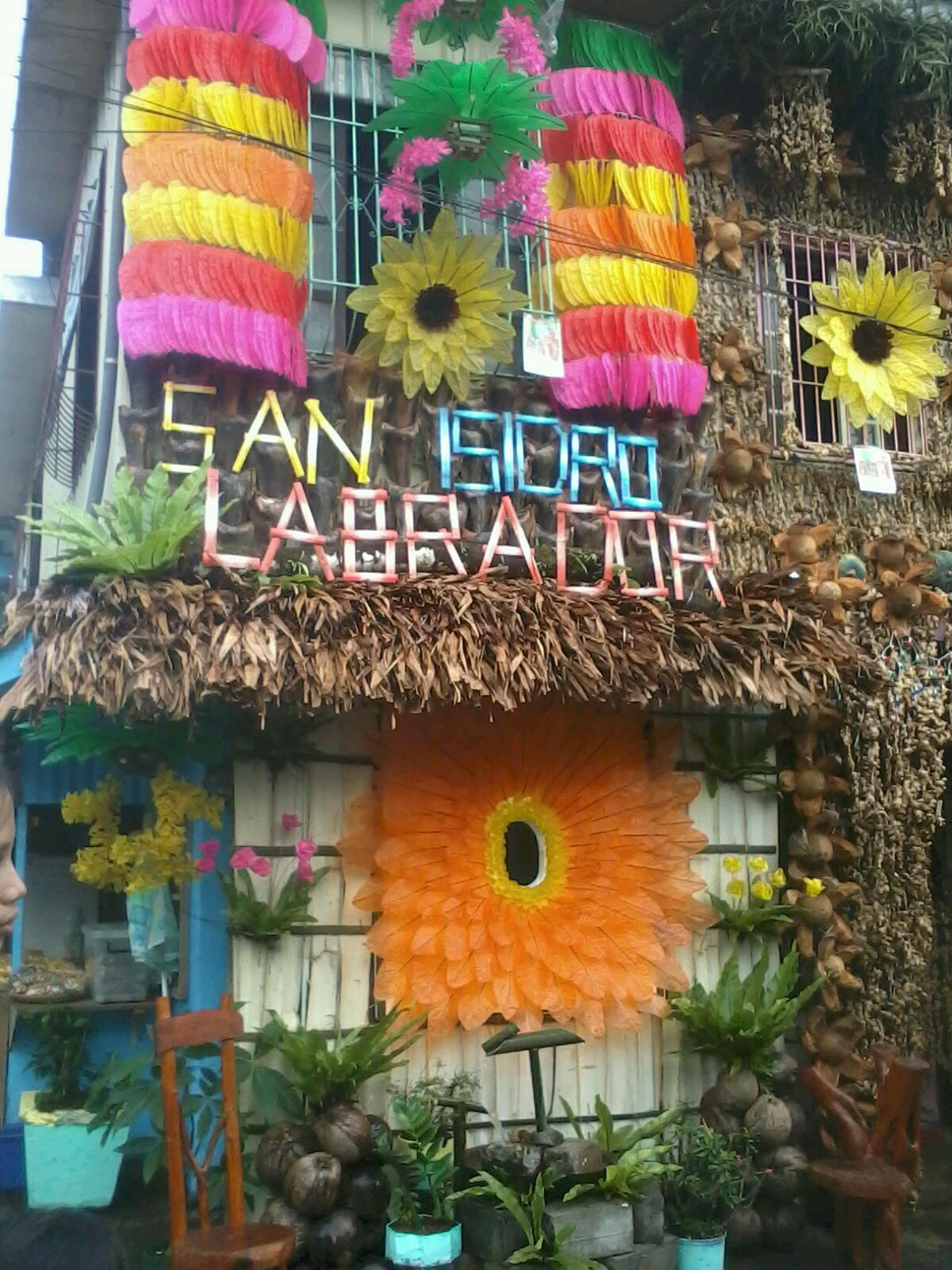
Pahiyas 2012

Among the festivals of Quezon, the three most prominent and famous are the Pahiyas Festival of Lucban, the Niyogyugan Festival, and Katang Festival of Calauag.

The Pahiyas Festival is the thanksgiving celebration of the people in Lucban for the Feast of St. Isidore Labrador, the patron saint of farmers. Held every May 15, during the Pahiyas Festival people of Lucban decorate their houses in the most creative manner. They use their harvest vegetables and grains like rice, chayotes, radishes, tomatoes, sweet potatoes, squash and the colorful kiping. Kiping is an ornament made of grounded rice flour shaped into leaves and dyed in different colors. These materials are used to make the houses colorful during the event which Pahiyas is famous for.

The Niyogyugan Festival is a relatively new festival that started in 2012 celebrating the province's main product, the coconut, including Lambanog. The festival celebrates the diversity of every town in the province through an expo. During this expo, the different towns build their own booths showcasing the best qualities of their town and then present the products that their respective towns produce. During this event, towns also join the Float Parade and Street Dancing Competition.

According to journalist and international boxing judge Rey Danseco, Calauag celebrates Katang Festival (Crab Festival). The annual festivities take place several days until May 25, the town's founding anniversary. Tourists join the fiesta celebration and presentations of Indigenous products, delicacies, and different ways of cooking Katang. The Karera ng Katang (Crab Race) and Pabilisan at Paramihan ng Maitataling Katang (Crab Tying Race) are some of the highlights of the festivities. The Philippines’ Department of Tourism (DOT) promotes the Katang Festival as "A festival highlighting the Higanteng Alimango as their icon. The feast celebrates the abundance of mud crab in the province.“ Katang Festival aims to promote Agro-Tourism and Calauag's distinction as a source of crab and other marine products such as shrimp (hipon or swahe) and giant Asian tiger prawn (sugpo) in the Philippines.

Other festivals are Mayohan sa Tayabas (Tayabas City), Yubakan Festival (Quezon), Agawan Festival (Sariaya), Araña't Baluarte (Gumaca), Pasayahan sa Lucena (Lucena City), Candle Festival (Candelaria), Boling Boling Festival (Catanauan), Maubanog Festival (Mauban), Kaway Festival (Tagkawayan), Laguimanoc Festival (Padre Burgos), Tariktik Festival (Polillo), Centurion Festival (Mulanay, San Narciso, General Luna), Buhusan Festival (Lucban), Kubol ng Macalelon (Macalelon), Hambujan Festival (Dolores), Pamaypayan Festival (Lopez), Coconut Festival (Alabat), Kayakas Festival (Perez), Mais Festival (Tiaong), Gayang Festival (Guinayangan), Tagultol Fishing Festival (Atimonan), Palay Iskad Festival (Buenavista), Maisan Festival (San Andres) and Papag at Bilao Festival (Pagbilao)

=== Cuisine ===
As one of the consistent top producers of coconut, Quezon is also dubbed as the "Coconut Capital of the Philippines". With the abundance of coconuts in the area, Quezon became famous for its native liqueurs such as lambanog and tubâ. Quezon's food is richly influenced by native ingredients found in the area like coconut and other agricultural crops. As such, gata or coconut milk can be found in different dishes like ginataang suso (snail with fern in coconut milk), kulawo, sinugno, ginanga, sinantulan and pinais. Since Quezon has a long coastline, food with seafood as the main ingredient is common in the province. As the province borders Batangas, Laguna, and Bicol, some dishes like lomi, buko pie, and laing are relatively common in the area.

Local specialty dishes include pansit habhab, pansit chami, Lucban longganisa, hardinera, sinantomas (local braised meat dish), bumbay (batsoy tagalog), dinayukan, alang-ang and other dishes made of native fern called pako. Quezon is also known for popular pastries and delicacies such as budin, Yema cake, puto bao, letse puto, minukmok, tikoy, kalamay, kalabasang pilipit, pinagong and pitsi pitsi.

Heritage buildings in Sariaya, including the Don Catalino Rodriguez Ancestral House or Villa Sariaya (blue building)

=== Architectural heritage ===
Quezon is home to several heritage houses dating from the early 20th century, including the Enriquez-Gala Mansion, Gala-Rodriguez House, and Villa Sariaya. Built in architectural styles influenced by American-era design, these houses reflect the wealth of local coconut landowners and provide insight into the area's history during periods of conflict. Some heritage buildings have been identified as being at risk due to proposed road-widening projects in the poblacion, which could affect the preservation of these historic structures.

The country life of the Philippines is what the Villa Escudero in Tiaong offers to its guests. Featuring its waterfall restaurant, the plantation resort actually has deep historical roots tracing its origins back to the coconut growing industry of Quezon. Other Spanish-era structures also exist outside Sariaya such as the Casa de Comunidad de Tayabas and Malagonlong Bridge.

Diocese of San Diego De Alcala in Gumaca, Minor Basilica de San Miguel in Tayabas and St. Louis Bishop Parish in Lucban are other testaments of Spanish history in the province.

Aside from old churches, the Kamay ni Hesus Healing Grotto located in Lucban is a popular pilgrimage site.

== Tourism ==
"Parini Na!"
A sample of "Parini Na!" by Clark Aranilla. The song refers to Quezon's life, culture, and traditions.

Quezon has a huge potential for optimum utilization of and considerable revenue generation from the tourism sector. There are 180 nature tourism attractions, 104 history and culture tourism attractions, and 42 customs and traditions. Also, there are 41 industrial tourism attractions and 41 sites for sports and recreational activities. Meanwhile, there are also several venues for shopping activities, health and wellness, and special events.

There are 37 DOT-accredited tourism establishments with total of 1,533 rooms in the province as of 2021. There are also numerous locally registered tourism establishments in Quezon such as beach resorts, private pools, tourist inns, etc., which cater to throngs of tourists from both within and outside the province.

In 2021, a total of 2,034,485 tourist arrivals were recorded in the province, of which, 2,033,779 tourists were domestic and 706 tourists were foreign.

=== Beaches and springs ===
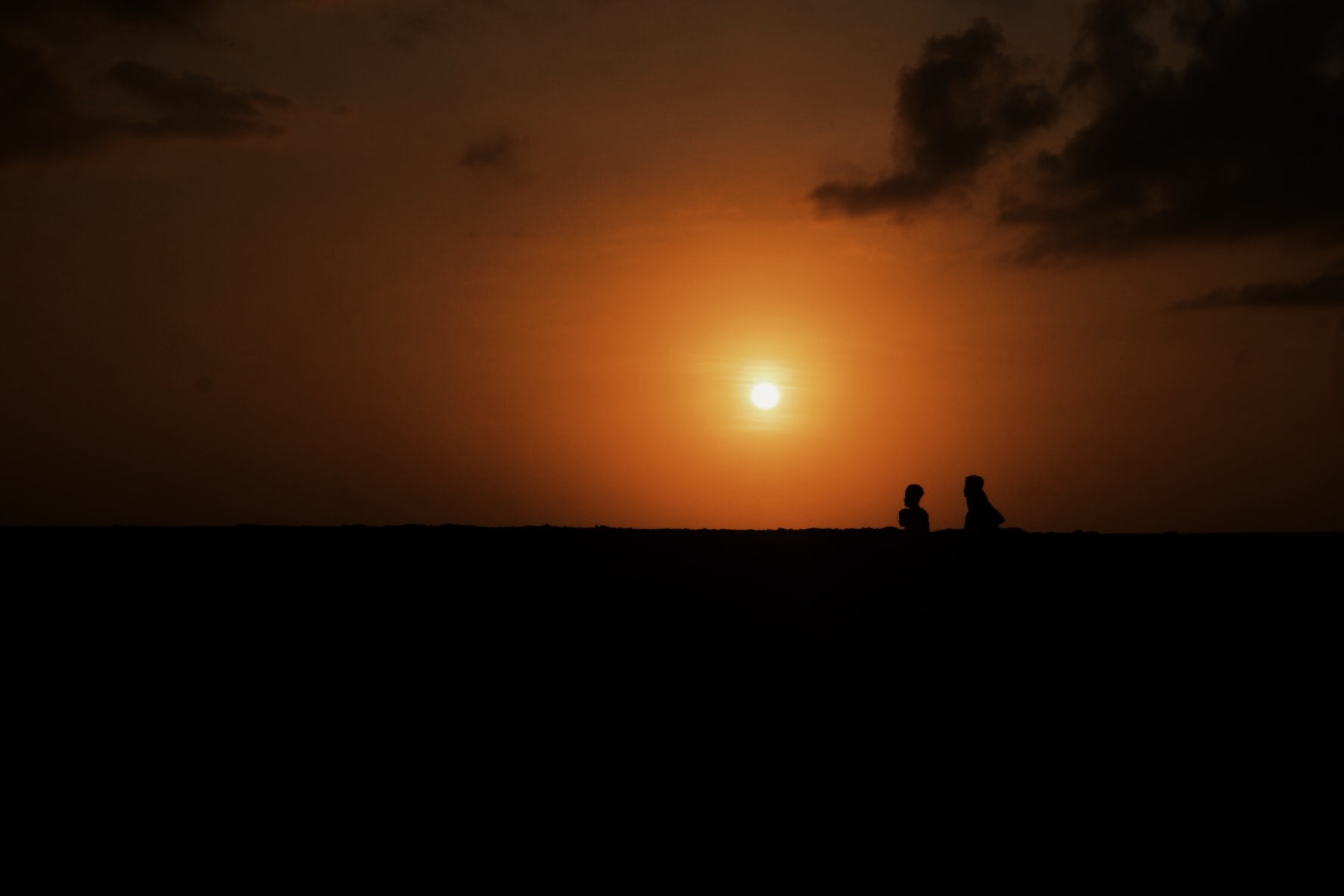
Sunrise in Real, Quezon

To the north, the island of Balesin (part of Polillo) is known to attract the more wealthy tourists. The exclusive island resort features seven resorts, providing its members the luxury of choosing to stay in differently themed villas. The farther Salibungot beach of Jomalig is more well-known to backpackers. Real, on the other hand, is becoming known for surfing. Pulong Pasig in Calauag and Cagbalete Island of Mauban are known for white beaches.

In the central portion of the province, the beaches of Guisguis in Sariaya have long been considered a local destination. Several resorts including Villa del Prado Resort, Dalampasigan Beach Resort and the Montevista Beach Resort are some of the resorts in the area.

In the south, the Bondoc Peninsula towns offer an array of resorts with good beaches such as the municipalities of Agdangan, Unisan and Catanauan. The islands of Padre Burgos also showcase the “ Borawan Island “ with pure sand like Boracay and a scenic view like Palawan, hence its name Borawan. While in the Lamon Bay Area of Quezon, the Island of Alabat (under the municipalities of Perez, Alabat, and Quezon) offers countless beach resorts.

=== Mountains ===
Rugged terrains characterize the province's topography with few plains, valleys, and swamps. The Sierra Madre Mountain Range runs along the entire length of the area, with Mount Banahaw (an active volcano) rising at 2,169 meters (7,116 ft) above sea level. Only narrow strips of land along the coast and river valleys are available for growing crops. The undulating lowlands along the coast are well-drained. The province is narrow, averaging about 30 meters (98 ft) by width.

Mount Banahaw is a pilgrimage site for some locals who believe the mountain to be holy. Although considered an active volcano, hiking has been popular with both religious pilgrims as well as hikers. There are two trails to the mountain, both originating from Barangay Kinabuhayan in the town of Dolores. The most frequently used trails are the Cristalino and Tatlong Tangke, taking an average of 9 and 5 hours, respectively but both converge at the volcano's summit. At the peak are viewpoints, labeled as Durungawan I, II, and III, which are the usual destination for pilgrims and hikers. However, due to pollution and trash left by these visitors, Mt. Banahaw was closed to the public until further notice.

== Notable people ==
=== National heroes and patriots ===
- Hermano Pule, religious leader who founded and led the Cofradía de San José. – Lucban
- Guillermo Nakar, guerilla soldier - Infanta (the barangay where he was born, Anoling, is now part of General Nakar, which was named after him)
- Josefina Guerrero, spy and war heroine - Lucban
- Pablo Astilla, Filipino revolutionary colonel during the Philippine Revolution and Philippine-American War. He was the last Governor of the now dissolved District of Infanta - Infanta

=== Arts and Sciences ===
- Fides Cuyugan-Asensio, National Artist of the Philippines for Music - Lucena
- Paz Márquez-Benítez, author of Dead Stars (1925), short-story writer, educator and editor - Lucena
- Orlando Nadres, writer/screenwriter/director – Tayabas
- Gil M. Portes, a Filipino film director, film producer and screenwriter – ,Pagbilao
- Mel Chionglo, film director and production designer - Lucena
- Raymundo Punongbayan, former director of PHIVOLCS – Calauag

=== Religion ===
- Fausta Labrador y Zarzadias, Catholic laywoman known as Ina ng Lucena - Lucena
- Angel Lagdameo, Archbishop of the Archdiocese of Jaro and former president of the Catholic Bishops' Conference of the Philippines – Lucban
- Emilio Z. Marquez, former bishop of the Roman Catholic Diocese of Lucena, first Bishop of Gumaca - Lopez
- Horacio de la Costa, Jesuit, historian, the first Filipino provincial superior of the Society of Jesus in the Philippines - Maúban
- Jose Francisco Oliveros, the second Bishop of the Diocese of Boac, Marinduque and fourth Bishop of the Diocese of Malolos – Quezon, Quezon
- Edwin Panergo, the current Bishop of the Diocese of Boac, Marinduque -Lucban

=== Politics, government, and civil society ===
- Manuel L. Quezon, the second president of the Philippines – Baler (now a part of Aurora)
- Eulogio Lerum, labor leader, Sectoral Representative for organized labor in Philippine Congress (1978–1986), Member of the Constitutional Commission (ConCom) which drafted the 1987 Philippine Constitution – Calauag
- Claro M. Recto, former senator, former associate justice of the Philippine Supreme Court – Tiaong
- Lorenzo Tañada, former senator – Gumaca
- Rene Saguisag, former senator, human rights lawyer - Maúban
- Wigberto Tañada, former Liberal Party president and former senator – Gumaca
- Agnes Devanadera, former solicitor-general and former acting secretary of the Department of Justice – Sampaloc
- Proceso Alcala, 43rd Secretary of the Department of Agriculture – Lucena City
- Vitaliano Aguirre, 58th Secretary of the Department of Justice – Mulanay
- Manoling Morato, former chairman of the Philippine Charity Sweepstakes Office, 1998 Presidential Candidate – Calauag
- Lorenzo Tañada III, 5th representative of Quezon's 4th congressional district, Liberal Party president – Gumaca
- Gaudencio Vera, former 2nd district representative and guerilla leader. - Lopez
- Jose Mari Gonzales – actor and politician – Mauban
- Reynante Arrogancia, representative of Quezon's 3rd congressional district. – Unisan
- Keith Micah Tan, representative of Quezon's 4th congressional district. – Gumaca
- Rafael Nantes, former 1st district representative and governor. – Polillo
- Danilo Suarez, former Governor of Quezon – Lucena City
- Tomas Morato, last municipal president and first mayor of Calauag and Quezon City, first representative of the 2nd District of Tayabas Province, Manuel L. Quezon's best friend – Calauag
- Tobias Enverga, filipino canadian politician Lucena
- Heidi Mendoza, Filipina auditor, Certified Public Accountant, and former civil servant. She served as Under-Secretary-General of the United Nations Office of Internal Oversight Services (OIOS) from 2015 to 2019. – Tayabas
- Arturo Enrile, 24th chief of staff of the Armed Forces of the Philippines - Lucena
- Guillermo Eleazar, PNP Chief who has previously served as chief of the Quezon City Police District, Director of the PNP Calabarzon and the National Capital Region Police Office – Tagkawayan
- Ye Fei, former Chinese military leader, Vice Chairman of the Standing Committee of the National People's Congress – Tiaong
- Hjalmar Quintana, OIC Governor of Quezon and member, Regular Batasang Pambansa- Mauban
- Oscar F. Santos, Jr.- former 4th district representative and member, Regular Batasang Pambansa- Alabat
- Cesar Bolanos- physician, OIC Governor of Quezon and member, Regular Batasang Pambansa- Candelaria
- Bienvenido Marquez, Jr.- former 3rd district representative and member, Regular Batasang Pambansa- Padre Burgos

=== Sports and beauty pageants ===
- Ahtisa Manalo, Miss Universe 2025 3rd Runner-Up – Candelaria
- Alisha del Campo, Member, Philippine Women's National Football Team – Calauag
- Cris Bolado, former PBA player – Lucban
- Cris Nievarez, olympian rower – Atimonan
- Gido Babilonia, former professional basketball player – Alabat
- Denok Miranda, former PBA player and coach in the UAAP – Lopez
- Jerwin Gaco, former professional basketball player – Alabat
- Kim Malabunga – men volleyball player –Pagbilao
- Leo Austria, former PBA player, current San Miguel Beermen coach in the PBA – Sariaya
- Leo Oracion, first Filipino mountaineer to successfully reach the Mt. Everest summit – Lucban
- Mark Magsumbol, first Filipino player in 31-team American Basketball Association (ABA) – Calauag
- Santos Sambajon, pool player – Macalelon
- Rey Danseco, WBC Award winner-International Boxing Judge and sports editor – Calauag
- Louie Alas, former PBA player, current coach of Zamboanga Master Sardines – Unisan
- Mac Baracael, professional Filipino basketball player – Tagkawayan

=== Entertainment ===
- Alice Dixson, actress – Philippine Cinema – Buenavista
- Mig Macario, actor – Atimonan
- Ana Capri, actress – Infanta
- Chris Tsuper, radio DJ of Love Radio – Lucban
- Desiree del Valle – actress – Lopez
- Edgar Mortiz, actor/director – Infanta
- Ice Seguerra, Filipino actress and singer – Calauag
- JM Ibarra, actor – Mauban
- Lily Monteverde, movie producer – Sariaya
- Marcelito Pomoy, Filipino Singer, Pilipinas Got Talent season 2 champion, America's Got Talent 3rd Runner-up – Calauag
- Mau Marcelo, winner, Philippine Idol (ABC) – Lucena
- Paraluman, actress – Tayabas
- Pauline Mendoza, actress/model – Lucban
- Pia Moran - actress - Lucban
- Raimund Marasigan, musician (Eraserheads, Sandwich, Pedicab, Cambio) – Candelaria
- Rio Locsin, actress – Candelaria
- Roldan Aquino, former actor – Alabat
- Romeo Vasquez, actor – Tayabas
- Roy Alvarez, former actor and director – Pagbilao
- Tommy Abuel, actor – Tayabas
- Yayo Aguila, actress – Lucban
- Zaijian Jaranilla - Filipino actor and model having primary allegiance with ABS-CBN Corporation under Star Magic and secondary allegiance conditionally with other media companies (GMA Network and TV5 Network) who is best known for his role as the orphan Santino in the 2009–2013 ABS-CBN religious-themed teleserye, May Bukas Pa – Lucena
- Zymic Jaranilla - Zaijian Jaranilla's sibling who originally worked with ABS-CBN briefly and currently a GMA Network contract artist – Lucena
