= Tayabas Isthmus =

Isthmus in Luzon, Philippines

Location of Tayabas Isthmus in the Philippines encircled

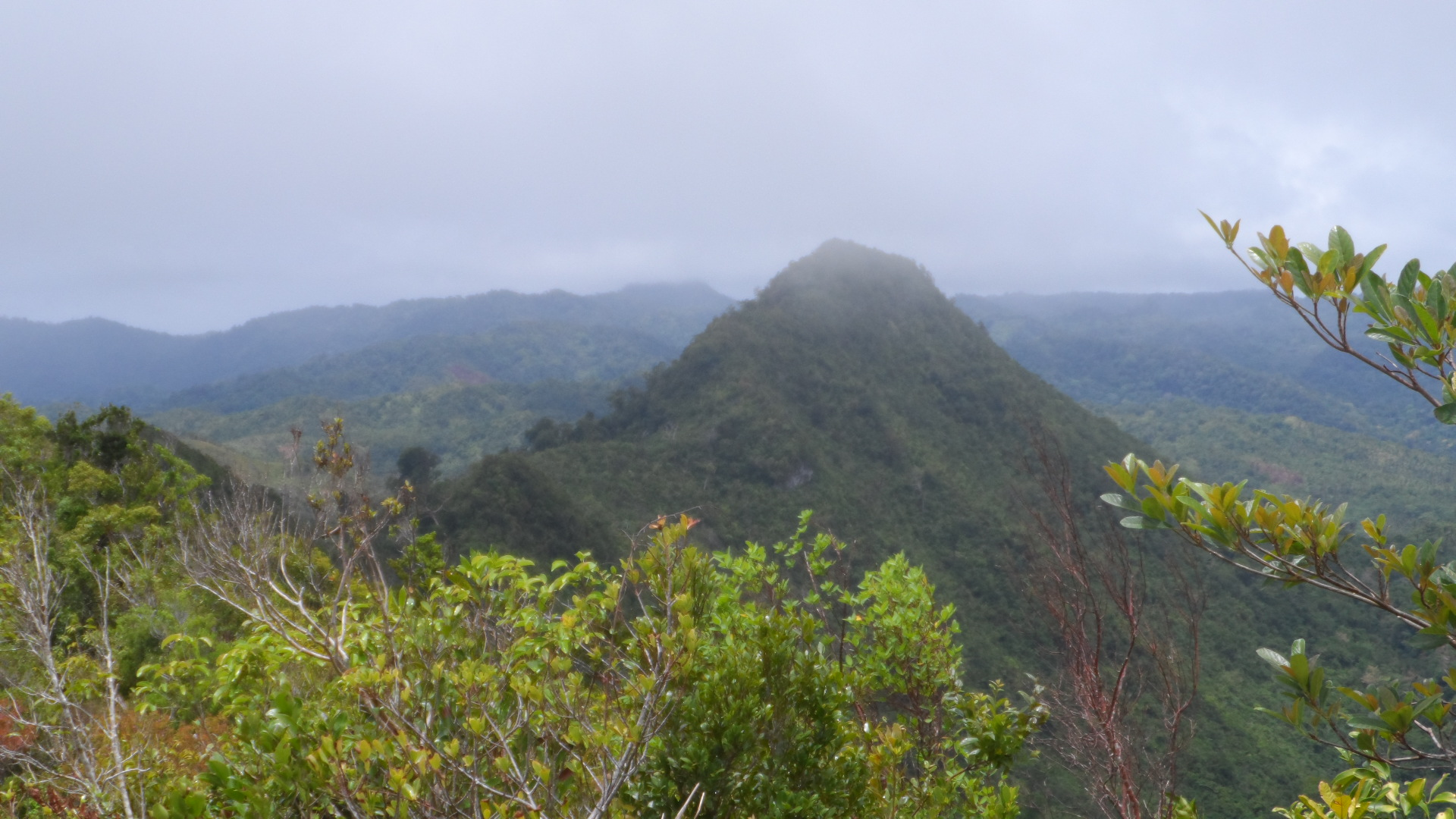
Quezon National Forest Park, located on the Tayabas Isthmus

Tayabas Isthmus separates the Bicol Peninsula from the main part of Luzon Island, and the Bondoc Peninsula which lies between Tayabas Bay and Ragay Gulf. Luzon has a width of 120 to 160 kilometers (75 to 99 mi) but it narrows to 13 kilometers (8.1 mi) and not more than 15 kilometers (9.3 mi), when it comes to such straits. The isthmus is located between the Tayabas Bay and Lamon Bay.

This isthmus is located in the province of Quezon and covers the towns of Atimonan, Plaridel, Padre Burgos, Agdangan, Unisan, and Pitogo.
