= 2013 Quezon local elections =

2013 Quezon gubernatorial election
- May 13, 2013
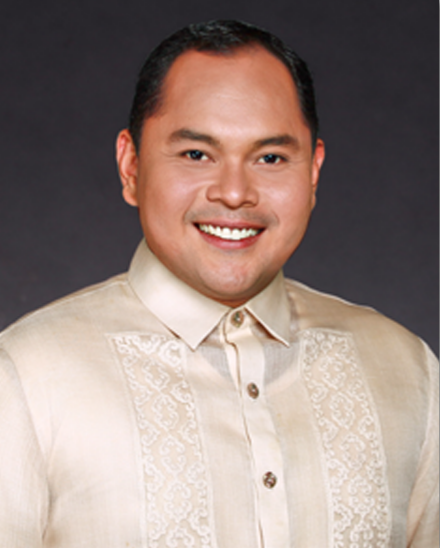
Nominee	David Suarez	Irvin Alcala
Party	NUP	Liberal
Running mate	Romano Talaga (UNA)	Samuel Nantes
Popular vote	279,372	244,600
Percentage	48.48	42.44
Governor before election
David Suarez
Lakas
Elected Governor
David Suarez
NUP

Local elections were held in the province of Quezon on May 13, 2013, as part of the 2013 general election. Voters will select candidates for all local positions: a town mayor, vice mayor and town councilors, as well as members of the Sangguniang Panlalawigan, the vice-governor, governor and representatives for the four districts of Quezon.

== Background ==
Incumbent David Suarez is running for a second term as governor of Quezon under the National Unity Party. Suarez assumed the governorship after defeating Rafael Nantes in the 2010 elections. His running mate is 2nd district board member Romano Franco Talaga.

Irvin Alcala, incumbent representative of the 2nd district of Quezon and son of incumbent Agriculture Secretary Proceso Alcala is running under the Liberal Party. Alcala was elected representative in 2010, as a replacement for his father who did not run and was later appointed as Agriculture Secretary. His running mate is Samuel Nantes, son of former governor Rafael Nantes who became governor in 2007 until his death on May 17, 2010.

== Opinion Polling ==
=== Gubernatorial election ===
Poll source	Date(s) conducted	Sample size	Margin of error	Alcala	Suarez
Data Advisors	April 28-May 1	—	±3.5%	54.7%	45.7%

== Provincial elections ==
The candidates for governor and vice governor with the highest number of votes wins the seat; they are voted separately, therefore, they may be of different parties when elected.

=== Gubernatorial election ===
Parties are as stated in their certificate of candidacies.

David Suarez is the incumbent.

Quezon Gubernatorial Election
Party	Candidate	Votes	%
NUP	David Suarez	279,372	48.48
Liberal	Irvin Alcala	244,600	42.44
Independent	Rolando Merano	1,992	0.35
Margin of victory		34,772	6.03%
Invalid or blank votes		50,327	8.73
Total votes		576,291	100.00

=== Vice-gubernatorial election ===
Parties are as stated in their certificate of candidacies.

Incumbent Vicente Alcala is running for congressman

Quezon Gubernatorial Election
Party	Candidate	Votes	%
Liberal	Samuel Nantes	263,335	45.70
UNA	Romano Franco Talaga^{[A]}	209,205	36.30
Independent	Mario Mapaye	4,455	0.77
Independent	Dolores Cueva	2,558	0.44
Margin of victory		54,130	9.39%
Invalid or blank votes		96,738	16.79
Total votes		630,421	100.00

== Congressional elections ==
=== 1st District ===
Wilfrido Mark Enverga is the incumbent.

2013 Philippine House of Representatives election at Quezon's 1st district
Party	Candidate	Votes	%
NPC	Wilfrido Mark Enverga	108,714	71.96
Aksyon	Pauline Anne Villaseñor	23,828	15.77
Margin of victory		84,886	56.19%
Rejected ballots		18,537	12.27%
Turnout		151,079	100.00

=== 2nd District ===
Incumbent Irvin Alcala is running for the governorship; his uncle, Vice Governor Vicente Alcala, is his party's nominee.

2013 Philippine House of Representatives election at Quezon's 2nd district
Party	Candidate	Votes	%
Liberal	Vicente Alcala	94,113	50.55
UNA	Barbara Ruby Talaga	42,791	22.98
Independent	Lynette Punzalan	16,245	8.73
Lakas	Kneigoutina Suarez	9,124	4.90
Independent	Marivic Rivera	475	0.26
Margin of victory		51,322	27.56%
Rejected ballots		23,438	12.59%
Turnout		186,186	100

=== 3rd District ===
Incumbent Danilo Suarez is term-limited; his wife, former congresswoman Aleta Suarez, is his party's nominee.

2013 Philippine House of Representatives election at Quezon's 3rd district
Party	Candidate	Votes	%
Lakas	Aleta Suarez	64,805	55.28
Liberal	Shiela de Leon	35,836	30.57
Independent	Eduardo Rodriguez	956	0.81
Margin of victory		28,969	24.71%
Rejected ballots		75,641	13.34%
Turnout		117,238	100

=== 4th District ===
Incumbent Lorenzo Tañada III is term-limited; his brother Wigberto Jr. is his party's nominee.

2013 Philippine House of Representatives election at Quezon's 4th district
Party	Candidate	Votes	%
NPC	Angelina Tan	53,403	44.07
Liberal	Wigberto Tañada, Jr.	53,041	43.77
LM	Alvin John Tañada	4,735	3.91
Margin of victory		362	0.30%
Rejected ballots		9,996	8.25%
Turnout		121,175	100

== Provincial Board Elections ==
=== 1st District ===
Quezon Provincial Board Members
Party	Candidate	Votes	%
NUP	Tetchie Dator	80,402	
Liberal	Alona Obispo	74,455	
NUP	Jerry Talaga	46,423	
NPC	Aron Bantayan	9,373	
Margin of victory			
Rejected ballots			
Turnout			

=== 2nd District ===
Quezon Provincial Board Members
Party	Candidate	Votes	%
PMP	Gary Estrada	89,117	
NUP	Bong Talabong	87,294	
Liberal	Elizabeth Sio	81,016	
Liberal	Annalie Banta	46,932	
Margin of victory			
Rejected ballots			
Turnout			

=== 3rd District ===
Quezon Provincial Board Members
Party	Candidate	Votes	%
NUP	Bunso de Luna	51,604	
Nacionalista	Vic Reyes	45,514	
Liberal	Wendell Uy	27,126	
Liberal	Reynante Arrogancia	25,795	
Margin of victory			
Rejected ballots			
Turnout			

=== 4th District ===
Quezon Provincial Board Members
Party	Candidate	Votes	%
NUP	Manny Butardo	44,836	
Liberal	Rhodora Tan	44,058	
UNA	Rachel Ubaña	43,573	
UNA	Laurence Diestro	21,912	
Margin of victory			
Rejected ballots			
Turnout			

== City and municipal elections ==
=== 1st District, Candidates for Mayor ===
- City: Tayabas City
- Municipalities: Burdeos, General Nakar, Infanta, Jomalig, Lucban, Mauban, Pagbilao, Panukulan, Patnanungan, Polillo, Real, Sampaloc

==== Tayabas City ====
Dondi Silang is the incumbent.

}}

Tayabas City mayoralty election
Party	Candidate	Votes	%
UNA	Dondi Silang	22,423	52.66
Liberal	Aida Reynoso	18,452	43.34
Margin of victory		3971	9.33%
Invalid or blank votes		1703	4.00
Total votes		42,578	100.00

==== Burdeos ====
Gil Establecida is the incumbent, his opponent is Councilor Freddie Aman.

Burdeos mayoralty election
Party	Candidate	Votes	%
Liberal	Freddie Aman	1,356	49.72
NUP	Gil Establecida	1,165	42.72
Margin of victory		191	7.00%
Invalid or blank votes		206	7.56
Total votes		2,727	100.00

==== General Nakar ====
Obing Ruzol is the incumbent, his opponent is former mayor Hernando Avellaneda Sr.

General Nakar mayoralty election
Party	Candidate	Votes	%
Liberal	Obing Ruzol	3,745	59.56
Independent	Hernando Avellaneda Sr.	2,304	36.64
Margin of victory		1441	22.92%
Invalid or blank votes		239	3.80
Total votes		6,288	100.00

==== Infanta ====
Incumbent mayor Grace America is term-limited and running for vice mayor instead, her party nominates councilor Rodante Potes. his main opponent is Vice Mayor Ricardo Macasaet III.

Infanta mayoralty election
Party	Candidate	Votes	%
Liberal	Rodante Potes	6,088	33.00
UNA	Eriberto Escueta	6,080	32.96
NUP	Ricardo Macasaet III	5,772	31.29
Margin of victory		8	0.04%
Invalid or blank votes		507	2.75
Total votes		18,447	100.00

==== Jomalig ====
Rodel Tena is the incumbent, his opponents are vice mayor Ruben Belda and Alex Enverga.

Jomalig mayoralty election
Party	Candidate	Votes	%
NUP	Rodelo Tena	1,439	47.30
Liberal	Ruben Belda	692	22.75
NPC	Alex Enverga	592	19.46
Margin of victory		747	24.56%
Invalid or blank votes		319	10.49
Total votes		3,042	100.00

==== Lucban ====
Incumbent mayor Moises Villasenor is term-limited, his party nominate his son Marvin Loui Villasenor.

Lucban mayoralty election
Party	Candidate	Votes	%
NPC	Oli Dator	7,371	43.00
Liberal	Marvin Loui Villasenor	7,181	41.90
Independent	Sonny Venezuela	2,587	15.10
Total votes		17,139	100.00

==== Mauban ====
Fernando Llamas is the incumbent.

Mauban mayoralty election
Party	Candidate	Votes	%
NUP	Fernando Llamas	1,158	55.04
Liberal	Rex Bantayan	946	44.96
Total votes		2,104	100.00

==== Pagbilao ====
Incumbent Romeo Portes is not running; his daughter, councilor Shierre Ann Portes-Palicpic, is running for her position under NUP

Pagbilao mayoralty election
Party	Candidate	Votes	%
NUP	Shieree Ann Palicpic	17,900	
Independent	Gerry Luce	6,220	
Total votes		24,120	100.00

==== Panukulan ====
Duhe Postor is the incumbent.

Panukulan mayoralty election
Party	Candidate	Votes	%
NUP	Duhe Postor	1,479	
Liberal	Arsen Prudente	903	
Total votes		2,382	100.00

==== Patnanungan ====
Danteo Eusebio is the incumbent, his opponents are councilor Ellen Malarasta and Saling Abrazando.

Patnanungan mayoralty election
Party	Candidate	Votes	%
NUP	Danteo Eusebio	3,085	
NPC	Saling Abrazado	1,627	
Liberal	Ellen Malarasta	749	
Total votes		5,461	100.00

==== Polillo ====
George Versoza is the incumbent.

Polillo mayoralty election
Party	Candidate	Votes	%
NUP	Cristina Bosque	8,795	58.60
Liberal	George Verzosa	6,223	41.40
Total votes		15,018	100.00
NUP gain from Liberal			

==== Real ====
Incumbent Joel Amando Diestro is running for his re-election independently.

Real mayoralty election
Party	Candidate	Votes	%
Independent	Joel Amando Diestro	9,238	
Independent	Daniel Macasaet	2,093	
Total votes		11,331	100.00

==== Sampaloc ====
Naning Torres is the incumbent.

Sampaloc mayoralty election
Party	Candidate	Votes	%
NUP	Naning Torres	5,035	
Liberal	Ranchette Ramoso	2,343	
Total votes		7,378	100.00

=== 2nd District, Candidates for Mayor ===
- City: Lucena City
- Municipalities: Candelaria, Dolores, San Antonio, Sariaya, Tiaong

==== Lucena City ====
Lucena City mayoral election
Party	Candidate	Votes	%
Liberal	Roderick Alcala	49,733	58.96
UNA	Ramon Talaga, Jr.	34,619	41.04
Total votes		84,352	100.00

==== Candelaria ====
Candelaria mayoralty election
Party	Candidate	Votes	%
Liberal	Bong Maliwanag	27,753	75.94
UNA	Boy Bata Alimagno	8,794	24.06
Total votes		36,547	100.00

==== Dolores ====
Dolores mayoralty election
Party	Candidate	Votes	%
Liberal	Renato Alilio Sr.	1,153	
Independent	Oscar Reyes	1,399	
Total votes		2,552	100.00

==== San Antonio ====
San Antonio mayoralty election
Party	Candidate	Votes	%
Liberal	Erick Wegan	258	
UNA	Alvin Pillerba	188	
Nacionalista	Sabino Dela Pena	62	
Independent	Dante Hernandez	61	
Total votes			100.00

==== Sariaya ====
Sariaya mayoralty election
Party	Candidate	Votes	%
Liberal	Boyet Masilang	21,299	
PMP	Totie Mamuyac	14,984	
Total votes		19,201	100.00

==== Tiaong ====
Tiaong mayoralty election
Party	Candidate	Votes	%
Liberal	Ramon Preza	10,073	
NUP	Raul Umali	9,128	
Total votes			100.00

=== 3rd District, Candidates for Mayor ===
- Municipalities: Agdangan, Buenavista, Catanauan, General Luna, Macalelon, Mulanay, Padre Burgos, Pitogo, San Andres, San Francisco, San Narciso, Unisan

==== Agdangan ====
Agdangan mayoralty election
Party	Candidate	Votes	%
NUP	Vicenta Aguilar	3,171	
Liberal	Juancho Parafina	2,625	
UNA	Lito Legaspi	497	
Total votes		6,293	100.00

==== Buenavista ====
Buenavista mayoralty election
Party	Candidate	Votes	%
NUP	Medy Rivera	7,309	100.00
Total votes		7,309	100.00
NUP hold			

==== Catanauan ====
Catanauan mayoralty election
Party	Candidate	Votes	%
NUP	Ramon Orfanel	13,869	
Independent	Sebastian Felipe Serrano	9,325	
Total votes		23,194	100.00

==== General Luna ====
General Luna mayoralty election
Party	Candidate	Votes	%
NUP	Benson Sangalang	1,072	
Liberal	Ding Maraya	411	
Total votes		1,483	100.00

==== Macalelon ====
Macalelon mayoralty election
Party	Candidate	Votes	%
Liberal	Nelson Traje	1,788	
NUP	Marvin Tan	1,556	
Independent	Odong Itable	110	
Total votes		3,454	100.00

==== Mulanay ====
Mulanay mayoralty election
Party	Candidate	Votes	%
Liberal	Tito Ojeda	10,739	
NUP	Prudencio Maxino Jr.	10,453	
Total votes		21,192	100.00

==== Padre Burgos ====
Padre Burgos mayoralty election
Party	Candidate	Votes	%
NUP	Roger A. Panganiban	2,481	
Liberal	Leonora Hernandez	817	
Independent	Tita Fely Africa	44	
Total votes		3,342	100.00

==== Pitogo ====
Pitogo mayoralty election
Party	Candidate	Votes	%
NUP	Dante Bunag	1,350	
Independent	Ka-Ino Sayat	1,226	
Liberal	Dennis Gliane	708	
Total votes		3,284	100.00

==== San Andres ====
San Andres mayoralty election
Party	Candidate	Votes	%
NUP	Sergio Emprese	2,173	100.00
Total votes		2,173	100.00
NUP hold			

==== San Francisco ====
San Francisco mayoralty election
Party	Candidate	Votes	%
NUP	Litoy Alega	14,006	
NPC	Nani Tan	10,031	
Total votes		24,037	100.00

==== San Narciso ====
San Narciso mayoralty election
Party	Candidate	Votes	%
NUP	Allen Uy	5,822	
Total votes		5,822	100.00
NUP hold			

==== Unisan ====
Unisan mayoralty election
Party	Candidate	Votes	%
NUP	Nonato Puache	3,190	
Liberal	Cesar Alpay	1,101	
Independent	Arturo Constatino Jr.	99	
Total votes		4,390	100.00

=== 4th District, Candidates for Mayor ===
- Municipalities: Alabat, Atimonan, Calauag, Guinayangan, Gumaca, Lopez, Perez, Plaridel, Quezon, Tagkawayan

==== Alabat ====
Alabat mayoralty election
Party	Candidate	Votes	%
Liberal	Arlin Baldovino	1,694	36.67
Independent	FM-Alandy Mesa	1,644	35.60
Independent	Vic Cheng Chua	946	20.49
UNA	Nida Cabrera	177	3.83
Margin of victory		50	1.08%
Invalid or blank votes		157	3.40
Total votes		4,618	100

==== Atimonan ====
Mayor Jose F. Mendoza for his last term.

Atimonan mayoralty election
Party	Candidate	Votes	%
NPC	Jose Mendoza	9,497	51.19
Liberal	Derick Magbuhos	8,133	43.84
Margin of victory		1364	7.35%
Invalid or blank votes		921	4.96
Total votes		18,551	100

==== Calauag ====
Calauag mayoralty election
Party	Candidate	Votes	%
NUP	Luisito Visorde	4,065	51.71
Liberal	Eric Entienza	3,469	44.13
Margin of victory		596	7.58%
Invalid or blank votes		327	4.16
Total votes		7,861	100.00

==== Guinayangan ====
Guinayangan mayoralty election
Party	Candidate	Votes	%
Liberal	Boyboy Isaac	8,643	49.25
NUP	Angel Ardiente Jr.	7,093	41.28
UNA	Helen Torres	699	4.07
Margin of victory		1370	7.97%
Invalid or blank votes		929	5.41
Total votes		17,184	100

==== Gumaca ====
Gumaca mayoralty election
Party	Candidate	Votes	%
NUP	Erwin Caralian	4,736	44.30
Independent	Joy Cabangon	2,918	27.30
LDP	Pido Veluz	1,332	12.46
UNA	Noel Capisoda	1,331	12.45
Margin of victory		1818	17.01%
Invalid or blank votes		373	3.49
Total votes		10,690	100.00

==== Lopez ====
Lopez mayoralty election
Party	Candidate	Votes	%
NUP	Isaias Ubana II	18,353	50.24
Liberal	Joel Arago	16,589	45.41
Independent	Fiden Salumbides	208	0.57
Margin of victory		1764	4.83%
Invalid or blank votes		1379	3.78
Total votes		36,529	100

==== Perez ====
Perez mayoralty election
Party	Candidate	Votes	%
Liberal	Ping Reyes	242	55.13
NUP	Marsan Evangelista	175	39.86
UNA	Opel Regodon	1	0.23
Margin of victory		67	15.26%
Invalid or blank votes		21	4.78
Total votes		439	100

==== Plaridel ====
Plaridel mayoralty election
Party	Candidate	Votes	%
Liberal	Jose Saavedra	393	56.22
NUP	Bernard Tumagay	276	39.48
Margin of victory		117	16.74%
Invalid or blank votes		30	4.29
Total votes		699	100

==== Quezon ====
Quezon mayoralty election
Party	Candidate	Votes	%
NUP	Crispin Clacio	989	56.61
Liberal	Tuyan Lim	716	40.99
Margin of victory		273	15.63%
Invalid or blank votes		42	2.40
Total votes		1,747	100.00

==== Tagkawayan ====
Tagkawayan mayoralty election
Party	Candidate	Votes	%
Liberal	Jojo Frondoso	12,258	53.63
UNA	Third Salumbides	9,671	42.31
Margin of victory		2587	11.32%
Invalid or blank votes		928	4.06
Total votes		22,587	100
