= Governor of Quezon =

Local chief executive

- Punong Lalawigan ng Quezon; Punong Lalawigan ng Tayabas (previously)
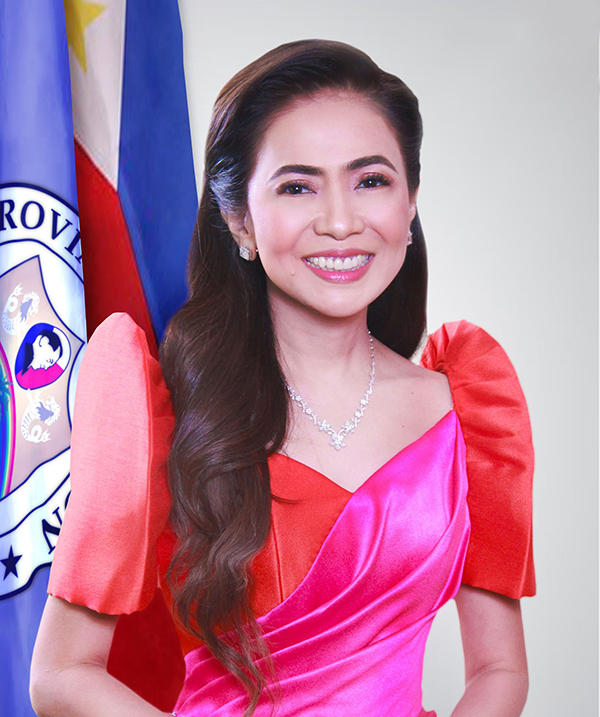
- Incumbent; Angelina Tan (NPC) since June 30, 2022
- Style: Mr./Ms./Mrs. Governor, Your Honor, Honorable (present); Don/The Most Excellent (spanish era)
- Residence: Governor's Mansion, Lucena City
- Seat: Tayabas Capitol
- Term length: 3 years, renewable for 3 consecutive terms
- Precursor: Military Governor of Tayabas
- Inaugural holder: Cornelius Gardener (R)
- Formation: 1901 (civil government)
- Deputy: Vice Governor of Quezon
- Website: quezon.gov.ph/executive

The governor of Quezon is the local chief executive of the Philippine province of Quezon, which was previously called Tayabas until 1946.

== List of governors of Quezon ==
#	Portrait	Governor	Term of office	Party	Place of origin	Vice Governor
1		Cornelius Gardener	1901 – 1902	Republican	United States of America (The Netherlands)	None
2		Harry Hill Bandholtz	1902 – 1903	Republican	United States of America (Constantine, Michigan)	None
3		Ricardo Parás	1903 – 1904	Independent	Boac (now in Marinduque)	None
4		Manuel L. Quezon	1906 – 1907	Nacionalista	Baler (now in Aurora)	None
5		Alfredo Castro	1907 – 1908	Nacionalista	Atimonan	None
6		Domingo Lopez	1908 – 1909	Nacionalista	Tayabas	None
7		Primitivo San Agustin	1909 – 1912	Nacionalista	Tayabas	None
8		Vicente Lukban	1912 – 1916	Nacionalista	Lucban (Labo, Camarines Norte)	None
9		Maximo Rodríguez	1916 – 1922	Nacionalista	Sariaya	None
10		Filemon Pérez	1922 – 1928	Nacionalista	Lucena	None
11		León Guinto	1928 – 1933	Nacionalista	Atimonan (Bacoor, Cavite)	None
12		Maximo Rodríguez	1933 – 1938	Nacionalista	Sariaya	None
13		Casiano Sandoval	1938 – 1940	Nacionalista	Lucena	None
14		Natalio Enríquez	1940 – 1946	Nacionalista	Sariaya	None
15		Hilarion Yanza	1946 – 1947	Nacionalista	Lucena	None
16		Andrés Umali	1947 – 1948	Nacionalista	Tiaong	None
17		Gregorio Santayana	1948 – 1951	Liberal	Unisan	None
18		Vicente Constantino	1951 – 1955	Liberal	Unisan	None
19		León Guinto	1955 – 1959	Nacionalista	Atimonan (Bacoor, Cavite)	None
20		Claro Robles	1959 – 1963	Nacionalista	Tiaong	Eladio Caliwara
20		Claro Robles	1959 – 1963	Liberal	Tiaong	Romualdo Vargas
21		Anacleto Alcala	1964 – November 2, 1980	Nacionalista	Lucena	León Guinto Jr.
21		Anacleto Alcala	1964 – November 2, 1980	Nacionalista	Lucena	Godofredo Tan
21		Anacleto Alcala	1964 – November 2, 1980	Nacionalista	Lucena	Amparo Lavides
21		Anacleto Alcala	1964 – November 2, 1980	Liberal	Lucena	Dante Diamante
21		Anacleto Alcala	1964 – November 2, 1980	Liberal	Lucena	Medardo Tumagay
21		Anacleto Alcala	1964 – November 2, 1980	KBL	Lucena	Eladio Caliwara
22		Eladio Caliwara	1981 – 1986	UNIDO–Liberal	Alabat	Anacleto Alcala
22		Eladio Caliwara	1981 – 1986	UNIDO–Liberal	Alabat	Hobart Dator
23		Cesar Bolaños (Note: Appointed Officer in charge)	April 10, 1986 – March 23, 1987	UNIDO–Liberal	Candelaria	Romeo Montano
–		Hjalmar Quintana	March 24, 1987 – December 1, 1987	UNIDO–PDP–Laban	Mauban	Ismael Portes
24		Eduardo Rodriguez	February 3, 1988 – August 7, 1995 (Note: Temporary Restraining Order against him)	PDP–Laban	Unisan	Robert Racelis
25		Robert Racelis	August 8, 1995 – July 25, 1996	PDP–Laban	Sariaya	Edelyn Loo
26		Eduardo Rodriguez	July 26, 1996 – June 30, 1998	PDP–Laban	Unisan	Robert Racelis
26		Eduardo Rodriguez	July 26, 1996 – June 30, 1998	PDP–Laban	Unisan	Claro Talaga Jr.
27		Wilfrido Enverga	June 30, 1998 – June 30, 2007	KNP	Mauban	Jovito Talabong
27		Wilfrido Enverga	June 30, 1998 – June 30, 2007	Nacionalista	Mauban	David Suarez
28		Rafael Nantes	June 30, 2007 – May 17, 2010 (Note: Died in office.)	Liberal	Polillo	Kelly Portes
–		Kelly Portes (Note: Acting governor)	May 17, 2010 – June 30, 2010	Liberal	Pagbilao	Lourdes de Luna-Pasatiempo
29		David Suarez	June 30, 2010 – June 30, 2019	Lakas	Unisan	Vicente Alcala
29		David Suarez	June 30, 2010 – June 30, 2019	NUP	Unisan	Samuel Nantes
29		David Suarez	June 30, 2010 – June 30, 2019	Nacionalista	Tiaong	Samuel Nantes
30		Danilo Suarez	June 30, 2019 – June 30, 2022	Lakas	Lucena	Samuel Nantes
31		Angelina Tan	June 30, 2022 – present	NPC	Gumaca (Rosario, Batangas)	Anacleto Alcala III
31		Angelina Tan	June 30, 2022 – present	Stan Q	Gumaca (Rosario, Batangas)	Anacleto Alcala III

== Elections ==
- 2001 Quezon local elections
- 2004 Quezon local elections
- 2007 Quezon local elections
- 2010 Quezon local elections
- 2013 Quezon local elections
- 2016 Quezon local elections
- 2019 Quezon local elections
- 2022 Quezon local elections
- 2025 Quezon local elections
