= 2019 Quezon local elections =

2019 Quezon gubernatorial election
- May 13, 2019
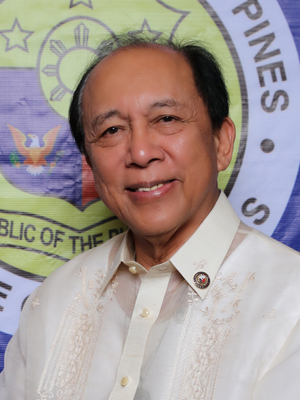

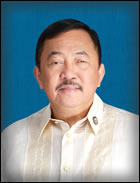
Nominee	Danilo Suarez	Vicente Alcala
Party	Lakas	PDP–Laban
Running mate	Samuel Nantes (Nacionalista)	Arcie Malite
Popular vote	576,361	242,258
Governor before election
David Suarez
Nacionalista
Elected Governor
Danilo Suarez
Lakas

Local elections were held in the Province of Quezon on May 13, 2019 as part of the 2019 general election. Voters selected candidates for all local positions: a town mayor, vice mayor and town councilors, as well as members of the Sangguniang Panlalawigan, the vice-governor, governor and representatives for the four districts of Quezon.

== Provincial elections ==
The candidates for governor and vice governor with the highest number of votes wins the seat; they are voted separately, therefore, they may be of different parties when elected. Governor David C. Suarez is term-limited and will be running as congressman. He later left the National Unity Party and assumed chairmanship for the Nacionalistas in the province. The Nacionalista Party and Lakas–CMD is in coalition this elections to support Minority Floor Leader and 3rd District Congressman Danilo Suarez for governor and the incumbent Samuel Nantes for vice governor. The Nacionalista Party is currently the largest political party in the province, with incumbents as its members. PDP–Laban will support 2nd District Congressman Vicente Alcala for governor and his candidates. Congressman Alcala is supported by his ally, PDP–Laban local president, Vitaliano Aguirre II. The former Justice secretary is also a political nemesis of the Suarezes in Bondoc Peninsula. The Liberal Party and Aksyon Demokratiko will support Alcala for governor, despite leaning to the opposition. The Nationalist People's Coalition will not support any candidate for governor as most members are split with their alliances.

=== Gubernatorial election ===
Parties are as stated in their certificate of candidacies.

David Suarez is term-limited.

Quezon Gubernatorial Election
Party	Candidate	Votes	%
Lakas	Danilo Suarez	576,361	
PDP–Laban	Vicente Alcala	242,258	
Independent	Serafin Dator	14,516	
Independent	Sonny Pulgar	8,131	
Independent	Ding Villena	5,930	
PFP	Fatima Abuy	4,169	
Margin of victory			
Invalid or blank votes			
Total votes			

=== Vice-gubernatorial election ===
Parties are as stated in their certificate of candidacies.

Samuel Nantes is the incumbent.

Quezon Gubernatorial Election
Party	Candidate	Votes	%
Nacionalista	Samuel Nantes	630,337	
PDP–Laban	Arcie Malite	112,275	
DPP	Geoffrey Estacio	12,076	
Independent	Teodorico Capina	12,825	
Margin of victory			
Invalid or blank votes			
Total votes			

== Congressional elections ==
=== 1st District ===
Incumbent Representative Katrina Enverga was withdrew her candidacy in favor to her brother former Representative Mark Enverga.

2013 Philippine House of Representatives election at Quezon's 1st district
Party	Candidate	Votes	%
NPC	Mark Enverga	179,831	
Margin of victory			
Rejected ballots			
Turnout			

=== 2nd District ===
Incumbent Representative Vicente Alcala is running for Governor, his party (PDP–Laban) nominates his brother former Representative Proceso Alcala, his opponent is outgoing Governor David Suarez.

2013 Philippine House of Representatives election at Quezon's 2nd district
Party	Candidate	Votes	%
Nacionalista	David Suarez	171,903	
Liberal	Proceso Alcala	120,998	
Aksyon	Amadeo Suarez	2,699	
PFP	Boyet Masilang	3,957	
DPP	Christian Señeres	1,076	
Margin of victory			
Rejected ballots			
Turnout			

=== 3rd District ===
Incumbent Representative Danilo Suarez is running for Governor, his wife Aleta, is his party nominee. Rodolfo "Rudy" Aguirre of PDP–Laban, the brother of former Justice Secretary Vitaliano Aguirre withdrews.

2019 Philippine House of Representatives election at Quezon's 3rd district
Party	Candidate	Votes	%
Lakas	Aleta Suarez	130,982	
Aksyon	Ronnie De Luna	24,448	
Margin of victory			
Rejected ballots			
Turnout			

=== 4th District ===
Angelina Tan is the incumbent and is running unopposed.

2013 Philippine House of Representatives election at Quezon's 4th district
Party	Candidate	Votes	%
NPC	Angelina Tan	178,766	100.00
Margin of victory			
Rejected ballots			
Turnout			

== Provincial board elections ==
Party	Popular vote		Seats	
Party	Total	%	Total	%
Nacionalista	716,694	42.41%	5	38%
Liberal	258,198	15.29%	0	0%
PDP–Laban	241,471	14.29%	1	8%
NPC	235,105	13.91%	2	15%
Lakas	91,109	5.39%	1	8%
Aksyon	48,940	2.90%	0	0%
PDDS	8,234	0.49%	0	0%
PFP	4,242	0.25%	0	0%
Independent	85,933	5.09%	1	8%
Total	1,689,926	100%	10	77%

=== 1st District ===
Quezon Provincial Board Members
Party	Candidate	Votes	%
Lakas	Alona Obispo	89,288	
Nacionalista	Jerry Talaga	76,964	
Nacionalista	Aileen Buan	63,158	
Liberal	Tetchie Dator	63,747	
Aksyon	Rannie Fuentes	26,339	
Margin of victory			
Rejected ballots			
Turnout			

=== 2nd District ===
Quezon Provincial Board Members
Party	Candidate	Votes	%
Nacionalista	Yna D. Liwanag	141,137	
Nacionalista	Romano Talaga	135,449	
PDP–Laban	Elizabeth Sio	178,111	
Liberal	Hermilando Alcala	117,429	
Liberal	Boyet Alejandrino	69,639	
PDP–Laban	Michael Tañada	24,886	
DPP	Teodorico Gonzales	7,954	
PFP	Roger Casulla	4,122	
Margin of victory			
Rejected ballots			
Turnout			

=== 3rd District ===
Quezon Provincial Board Members
Party	Candidate	Votes	%
Nacionalista	Jet Suarez	118,220	
Independent	Reynante Arrogancia	84,742	
Nacionalista	Tony Avila	31,870	
PDP–Laban	Bito Gonzales	10,463	
Aksyon	Wally Alaurin	4,506	
Margin of victory			
Rejected ballots			
Turnout			

=== 4th District ===
Quezon Provincial Board Members
Party	Candidate	Votes	%
NPC	Isaias Ubaña	100,479	
Nacionalista	Dhoray Rhodora Tan	87,638	
NPC	Derick Magbuhos	79,003	
NPC	Rizaldy Velasco	55,110	
Nacionalista	Raquel Mendoza	45,699	
PDP–Laban	Edsel Libranda	19,765	
Aksyon	Malvin Malite	16,842	
Margin of victory			
Rejected ballots			
Turnout			

== Lucena City local elections ==
This refers to the candidates and winners of the 2016 election in the highly urbanized city of Lucena, independent from the province.

=== Mayoralty elections ===
Mayor Roderick Alcala and Vice Mayor Philip Castillo are the incumbents.

Lucena City mayoralty election
Party	Candidate	Votes	%
PDP–Laban	Roderick Alcala	89,134	
UNA	Ramon Talaga, Jr.	37,557	
Total votes		126,691	100.00

Lucena vice mayoralty election
Party	Candidate	Votes	%
PDP–Laban	Phillip M. Castillo	71,009	
Nacionalista	Atty. Bong Talabong	61,677	
Total votes		132,686	100.00

=== City council elections ===
Lucena City Council election
Party	Candidate	Votes	%
PDP–Laban	Anacleto Alcala III	81,403	
PDP–Laban	Danny Faller	74,525	
Liberal	Sunshine Abcede	69,761	
PDP–Laban	Wilbert Noche	68,152	
PDP–Laban	Baste Brizuela	65,648	
UNA	Nilo Villapando	64,384	
PDP–Laban	Amer Lacerna	63,375	
PDP–Laban	Jose Christian Ona	58,964	
UNA	Ramil Talaga	57,802	
Liberal	Nick Pedro	57,018	
PDP–Laban	Vic Paulo	56,442	
Nacionalista	Edwin Pureza	50,312	
PDP–Laban	German Ver Castillo	47,697	
DPP	Dr. JB Camaligan III	45,764	
UNA	Mike Dalida	45,141	
Nacionalista	Jun Buenaflor	28,029	
PFP	Edwin Aman	4,538	
DPP	Lloyd Arreglo	4,520	
Total votes		943,475	100.00

== City and municipal elections ==
=== 1st District, Candidates for Mayor ===
- City: Tayabas City
- Municipalities: Burdeos, General Nakar, Infanta, Jomalig, Lucban, Mauban, Pagbilao, Panukulan, Patnanungan, Polillo, Real, Sampaloc

==== Tayabas City ====
Aida Reynoso is the incumbent.

Tayabas City mayoralty election
Party	Candidate	Votes	%
Nacionalista	Aida Reynoso	19,378	
Independent	Dondi Silang	11,905	
NPC	Nick Abesamis	9,539	
PDP–Laban	Abner Malabanan	5,759	
Margin of victory			
Invalid or blank votes			
Total votes			

==== Burdeos ====
Freddie Aman is the incumbent.

Burdeos mayoralty election
Party	Candidate	Votes	%
NPC	Freddie Aman	3,037	
Nacionalista	Melissa Encomienda	2,804	
Lakas	Gil Establecida	1,372	
NUP	Bebel Avenilla	1,755	
Margin of victory			
Invalid or blank votes			
Total votes			

==== General Nakar ====
Elisio Ruzol is the incumbent.

General Nakar mayoralty election
Party	Candidate	Votes	%
Nacionalista	Elisio Ruzol	8,323	
Aksyon	Ricardo Avellaneda	8,045	
Margin of victory			
Invalid or blank votes			
Total votes			

==== Infanta ====
Filipina Grace America is the incumbent.

Infanta mayoralty election
Party	Candidate	Votes	%
Nacionalista	Filipina Grace America	16,646	
NPC	Allan Borreo	12,056	
Independent	Eriberto Escueta	1,150	
Margin of victory			
Invalid or blank votes			
Total votes			

==== Jomalig ====
Rodel Tena is the incumbent mayor.

Jomalig mayoralty election
Party	Candidate	Votes	%
NPC	Rodel Tena	2,009	
Nacionalista	Meriam Belda	1,300	
Margin of victory			
Invalid or blank votes			
Total votes			

==== Lucban ====
Oli Dator is the incumbent mayor

Lucban mayoralty election
Party	Candidate	Votes	%
NPC	Oli Dator	11,311	
PDP–Laban	Ayelah Deveza	5,764	
Nacionalista	Armando Abutal	4,936	
PFP	Arielnilo Abuy	444	
Margin of victory			
Invalid or blank votes			
Total votes			

==== Mauban ====
Fernando 'Dingdong' Llamas is term-limited.

Mauban mayoralty election
Party	Candidate	Votes	%
Nacionalista	Marita Llamas	13,408	
NPC	Erwin Pastrana	12,261	
PFP	Ferlou Llamas	5,034	
PMP	Leonchito Gapasangra	967	
Margin of victory			
Invalid or blank votes			
Total votes			

==== Pagbilao ====
Shierre Ann Palicpic is the incumbent mayor

Pagbilao mayoralty election
Party	Candidate	Votes	%
Nacionalista	Shierre Ann Palicpic	20,466	
DPP	Belen Batilo	9,089	
PFP	Arnel Amandy	2,531	
PDP–Laban	Gerry Luce	277	
Margin of victory			
Invalid or blank votes			
Total votes			

==== Panukulan ====
Amado Peñamora is the incumbent, but not running for mayor.

Panukulan mayoralty election
Party	Candidate	Votes	%
Nacionalista	Alfred Rigor Mitra	5,302	
NPC	Janice Peñamante	2,950	
Margin of victory			
Invalid or blank votes			
Total votes			

==== Patnanungan ====
Derick Larita is the incumbent mayor.

Patnanungan mayoralty election
Party	Candidate	Votes	%
NPC	Derick Larita	5,273	
Nacionalista	Danteo Eusebio	726	
Margin of victory			
Invalid or blank votes			
Total votes			

==== Polillo ====
Cristina Bosque is the incumbent.

Polillo mayoralty election
Party	Candidate	Votes	%
Nacionalista	Cristina Bosque	10,913	
PFP	May Estuita	3,123	
Margin of victory			
Invalid or blank votes			
Total votes			

==== Real ====
Bing Aquino is the incumbent mayor.

Real mayoralty election
Party	Candidate	Votes	%
Nacionalista	Bing Aquino	9,337	
NPC	Nemy Burgo	5,454	
Margin of victory			
Invalid or blank votes			
Total votes			

==== Sampaloc ====
Gelo Devanadera is the incumbent mayor, running unopposed

Sampaloc mayoralty election
Party	Candidate	Votes	%
Nacionalista	Gelo Devanadera	5,787	
Margin of victory			
Invalid or blank votes			
Total votes			

=== 2nd District, Candidates for Mayor ===
- City: Lucena City
- Municipalities: Candelaria, Dolores, San Antonio, Sariaya, Tiaong

==== Candelaria ====
Macky Boongaling is the incumbent mayor.

Candelaria mayoralty election
Party	Candidate	Votes	%
NPC	Macky Boongaling	29,400	
Akbayan	Bong Maliwanag	26,660	
Margin of victory			
Invalid or blank votes			
Total votes			

==== Dolores ====
Mario Milan Jr. is the incumbent mayor.

Dolores mayoralty election
Party	Candidate	Votes	%
Liberal	Orlan Calayag	7,593	
Nacionalista	Mario Milan Jr.	7,092	
Margin of victory			
Invalid or blank votes			
Total votes			

==== San Antonio ====
Erick Wagan is the incumbent mayor.

San Antonio mayoralty election
Party	Candidate	Votes	%
Nacionalista	Erick Wagan	11,441	
PFP	Rodante Hernandez	6,032	
Margin of victory			
Invalid or blank votes			
Total votes			

==== Sariaya ====
Marcelo Gayeta is the incumbent mayor.

Sariaya mayoralty election
Party	Candidate	Votes	%
PDP–Laban	Marcelo Gayeta	56,403	
Nacionalista	Jun dela Roca	9,226	
Margin of victory			
Invalid or blank votes			
Total votes			

==== Tiaong ====
Ramon Preza is the incumbent mayor.

Tiaong mayoralty election
Party	Candidate	Votes	%
Nacionalista	Ramon Preza	28,535	
Aksyon	Romano Castillo	16,887	
Margin of victory			
Invalid or blank votes			
Total votes			

=== 3rd District, Candidates for Mayor ===
- Municipalities: Agdangan, Buenavista, Catanauan, General Luna, Macalelon, Mulanay, Padre Burgos, Pitogo, San Andres, San Francisco, San Narciso, Unisan

==== Agdangan ====
Rhadam Aguilar is the incumbent mayor.

Agdangan mayoralty election
Party	Candidate	Votes	%
Nacionalista	Rhadam Aguilar	3,924	
PDP–Laban	Juancho Parafina	2,941	
Margin of victory			
Invalid or blank votes			
Total votes			

==== Buenavista ====
Alexander Rivera is the incumbent, running unopposed.

Buenavista mayoralty election
Party	Candidate	Votes	%
Nacionalista	Alexander Rivera	8,414	
Margin of victory			
Invalid or blank votes			
Total votes			

==== Catanauan ====
Ramon Orfanel is the incumbent mayor.

Catanauan mayoralty election
Party	Candidate	Votes	%
Nacionalista	Ramon Orfanel	16,117	
PDP–Laban	Bas Serrano	14,717	
Margin of victory			
Invalid or blank votes			
Total votes			

==== General Luna ====
Stevenson Sangalang is the incumbent, but running for vice mayor.

General Luna mayoralty election
Party	Candidate	Votes	%
Nacionalista	Matt Erwin Florido	7,139	
Lakas	Minerva Sangalang	5,243	
PDP–Laban	Jennifer Glifonea	160	
Margin of victory			
Invalid or blank votes			
Total votes			

==== Macalelon ====
Nelson Traje is the incumbent mayor.

Macalelon mayoralty election
Party	Candidate	Votes	%
PDP–Laban	Nelson Traje	7,344	
Nacionalista	Maria Liwayway Tan	5,113	
Margin of victory			
Invalid or blank votes			
Total votes			

==== Mulanay ====
Joselito A. Ojeda is term-limited.

Mulanay mayoralty election
Party	Candidate	Votes	%
Nacionalista	Jay Tito Ojeda II	13,239	
PDP–Laban	Kristine Aguirre-Adao	10,529	
Invalid or blank votes			
Total votes			

==== Padre Burgos ====
Mayor Roger Panganiban is term-limited.

Padre Burgos mayoralty election
Party	Candidate	Votes	%
NUP	Ruben Uy Diokno	4,844	
Nacionalista	Pablito Flores	4,155	
PDP–Laban	Nora Hernandez	2,222	
PFP	Adela Aguilar	87	
Margin of victory			
Invalid or blank votes			
Total votes			

==== Pitogo ====
Paulino Sayat is the incumbent mayor.

Pitogo mayoralty election
Party	Candidate	Votes	%
Nacionalista	Paulino Sayat	7,726	
Aksyon	Dennis Gliane	5,537	
Independent	Renato Lorica	109	
Margin of victory			
Invalid or blank votes			
Total votes			

==== San Andres ====
Serson Emprese is the acting mayor.

San Andres mayoralty election
Party	Candidate	Votes	%
PDP–Laban	Giovanne Lim	7,724	
Nacionalista	Serson Emprese	4,635	
Margin of victory			
Invalid or blank votes			
Total votes			

==== San Francisco ====
San Francisco mayoralty election
Party	Candidate	Votes	%
PDP–Laban	Elvira Alega	14,946	
Nacionalista	Rommel Edaño	13,444	
Margin of victory			
Invalid or blank votes			
Total votes			

==== San Narciso ====
Pobel Uy-Yap is the incumbent mayor.

San Narciso mayoralty election
Party	Candidate	Votes	%
PDP–Laban	Pobel Uy-Yap	12,116	
Nacionalista	Dominic Reyes	10,509	
Margin of victory			
Invalid or blank votes			
Total votes			

==== Unisan ====
Nonato Puache is term-limited as mayor.

Unisan mayoralty election
Party	Candidate	Votes	%
PDP–Laban	Ferdinand Adulta	6,078	
Nacionalista	Junjun Suarez	6,042	
Margin of victory			
Invalid or blank votes			
Total votes			

=== 4th District, Candidates for Mayor ===
- Municipalities: Alabat, Atimonan, Calauag, Guinayangan, Gumaca, Lopez, Perez, Plaridel, Quezon, Tagkawayan

==== Alabat ====
FM Alandy Mesa is the incumbent mayor.

Alabat mayoralty election
Party	Candidate	Votes	%
Nacionalista	FM Alandy Mesa	4,601	
Liberal	Juanito Soriano	2,949	
Margin of victory			
Invalid or blank votes			
Total votes			

==== Atimonan ====
Rustico Joven Mendoza is the incumbent, running unopposed.

Atimonan mayoralty election
Party	Candidate	Votes	%
NPC	Rustico Joven Mendoza	20,390	
Margin of victory			
Invalid or blank votes			
Total votes			

==== Calauag ====
Mayor Luisito Visorde is term-limited.

Calauag mayoralty election
Party	Candidate	Votes	%
NPC	Rosalinda Visorde	14,707	33.64%
Liberal	Lyndon Guerrero	10,200	23.33%
PFP	Martial Lawrence Francia	6,047	13.83%
Margin of victory			
Invalid or blank votes			
Total votes		30,954	70.80%

==== Guinayangan ====
Boyboy Isaac is the incumbent mayor.

Guinayangan mayoralty election
Party	Candidate	Votes	%
Nacionalista	Boyboy Isaac	12,687	
NPC	Gilbert Acob	7,018	
Margin of victory			
Invalid or blank votes			
Total votes			

==== Gumaca ====
Mayor Erwin Caralian is term-limited.

Gumaca mayoralty election
Party	Candidate	Votes	%
Nacionalista	Webster Letargo	17,978	
NUP	Elchor Caralian	10,743	
PDP–Laban	Pido Veluz	1,346	
Margin of victory			
Invalid or blank votes			
Total votes			

==== Lopez ====
Rachel Ubaña is the incumbent mayor.

Lopez mayoralty election
Party	Candidate	Votes	%
NPC	Rachel Ubaña	22,953	
PDP–Laban	Joedil Barros	17,364	
DPP	Tonton Meriado	370	
Margin of victory			
Invalid or blank votes			
Total votes			

==== Perez ====
Pepito Reyes is the incumbent mayor.

Perez mayoralty election
Party	Candidate	Votes	%
NPC	Pepito Reyes	4,342	
Liberal	Eden Sarne	2,374	
Margin of victory			
Invalid or blank votes			
Total votes			

==== Plaridel ====
Bernard Tumagay is the incumbent mayor.

Plaridel mayoralty election
Party	Candidate	Votes	%
NPC	Bernard Tumagay	4,671	
PDP–Laban	Wilfredo Magbuhos	1,661	
Margin of victory			
Invalid or blank votes			
Total votes			

==== Quezon ====
Crispin Clacio is the incumbent mayor

Quezon mayoralty election
Party	Candidate	Votes	%
NPC	Crispin Clacio	4,195	
PDP–Laban	Johnny Escolano	3,891	
Margin of victory			
Invalid or blank votes			
Total votes			

==== Tagkawayan ====
Tagkawayan mayoralty election
Party	Candidate	Votes	%
PDP–Laban	Carlo Eleazar	7,469	
Nacionalista	Myra Frondoso	7,338	
Aksyon	Roberto De Vero	6,662	
Lakas	Third Salumbides	3,713	
Margin of victory			
Invalid or blank votes			
Total votes			

== National Elections ==
=== Presidential ===
No Elections are held for president and vice president for midterm elections.

=== 2019 Philippine Senate election in Quezon ===
2019 Philippine Senate election in Quezon
Party	Candidate	Votes	%
Independent	Grace Poe	549,085	
Nacionalista	Cynthia Villar	531,427	
NPC	Lito Lapid	448,203	
Liberal	Bam Aquino	389,537	
LDP	Sonny Angara	380,460	
Nacionalista	Pia Cayetano	370,818	
UNA	Nancy Binay	333,708	
Lakas	Bong Revilla	332,856	
NPC	JV Ejercito	326,596	
PDP–Laban	Bong Go	307,489	
Liberal	Mar Roxas	281,404	
Liberal	Erin Tañada	278,747	
Rejected ballots			
Turnout			
