= Duhat, Quezon =

Duhat, Quezon, may refer to:

- Duhat, a barangay in Plaridel, Quezon, a fifth class municipality in the province of Quezon, Philippines
- Duhat, a barangay in Padre Burgos, Quezon, a fourth class municipality in the province of Quezon, Philippines
