= Duhat =

Duhat can refer to:

- The tree or fruit of Syzygium jambolanum
- The following places in the Philippines:
  - Duhat, Cavinti, Laguna Province
  - Duhat, Padre Burgos, Quezon Province
  - Duhat, Plaridel, Quezon Province
  - Duhat, Santa Cruz, Laguna Province
  - Duhat, Bocaue, Bulacan Province
