= 2010 Quezon local elections =

Part of 2010 Philippine general election

2010 Quezon gubernatorial election
- May 10, 2010
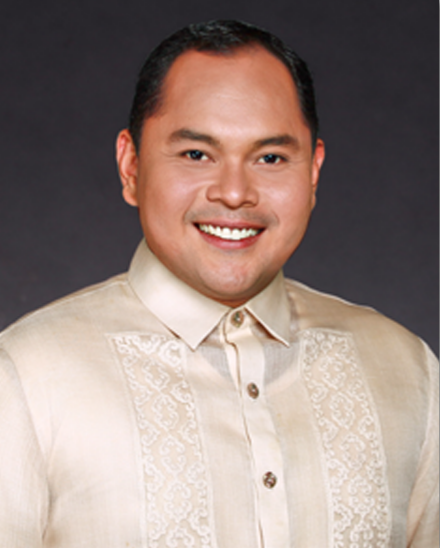

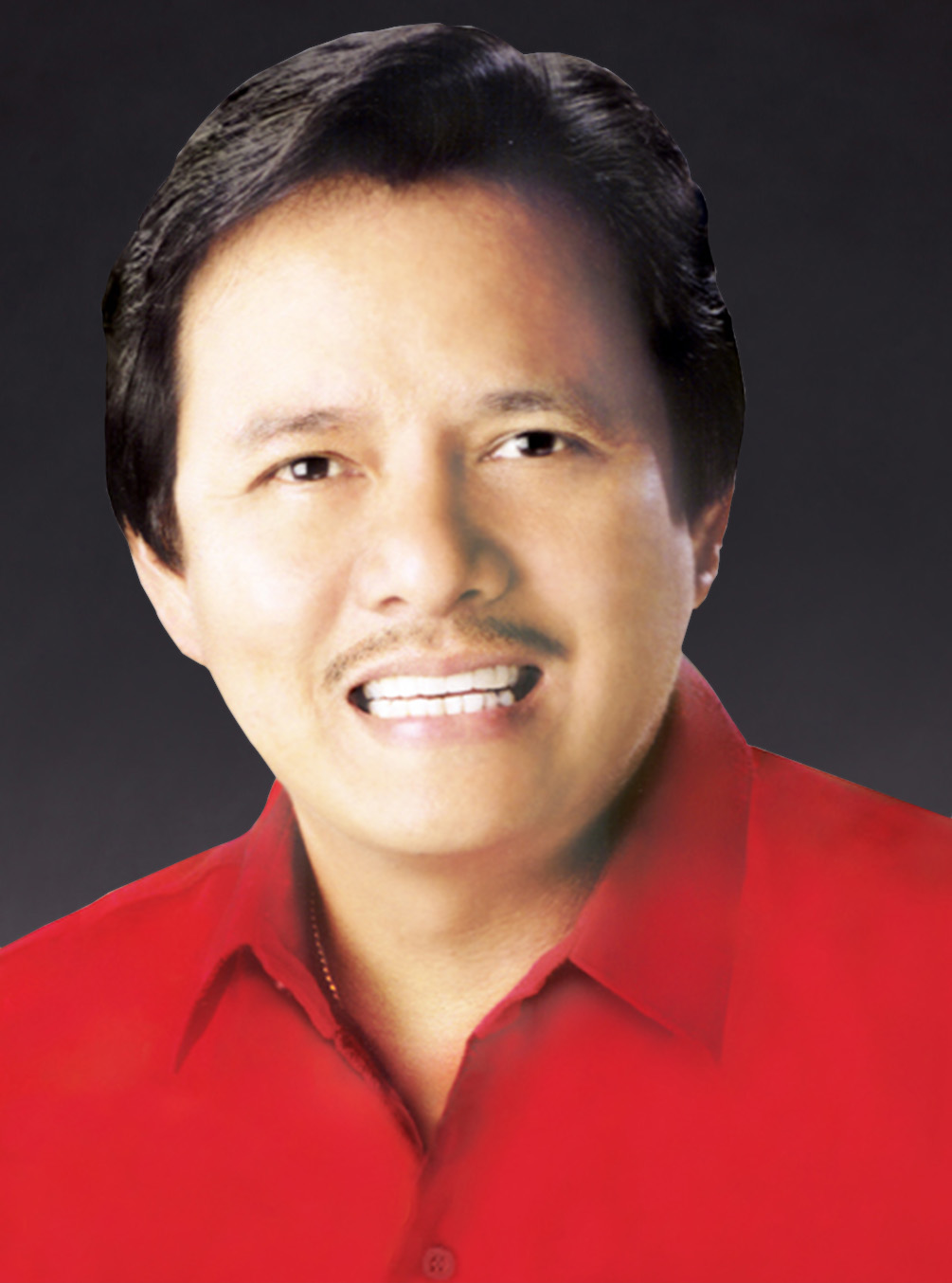
Nominee	David Suarez	Rafael Nantes
Party	Lakas–Kampi	Liberal
Running mate		Carlos Portes
Popular vote	397,858	333,292
Percentage	53.08	45.11
- Results per municipality and city Plaridel failed to submit their results electronically.
Governor before election
Rafael Nantes
Liberal
Elected Governor
David Suarez
Lakas–Kampi

Local elections were held in the province of Quezon on May 10, 2010, as part of the 2010 general election. Voters will select candidates for all local positions: a town mayor, vice mayor and town councilors, as well as members of the Sangguniang Panlalawigan, the vice-governor, governor and representatives for the four districts of Quezon.

Incumbent candidates are italicized.

== Provincial elections ==
=== Gubernatorial election ===
Incumbent governor Rafael Nantes is running for his second term. He will face former vice governor David Suarez.

Quezon gubernatorial election
Party	Candidate	Votes	%
Lakas–Kampi	David Suarez	397,858	53.84
Liberal	Rafael Nantes †	333,292	45.11
Independent	Rolando Rafa	2,532	0.34
Independent	Hobart Dator, Jr.	2,459	0.33
PGRP	Eduardo Cuenca	1,218	0.16
Independent	Buenaventura Pumarega	853	0.12
Independent	Glaceria Sta. Maria	695	0.09
Total votes		738,907	100.00
Lakas–Kampi gain from Liberal			

=== Vice Gubernatorial election ===
Incumbent vice governor Carlos Portes is running for his second term.

Quezon vice gubernatorial election
Party	Candidate	Votes	%
Independent	Vicente Alcala	383,867	56.58
Liberal	Carlos Portes	289,643	42.69
Independent	Florencio Laspinas, Sr.	4,978	0.73
Total votes		678,488	100.00
Independent gain from Liberal			

=== Provincial board elections ===
Party	Votes	%	Seats
Liberal	823,660	59.26	7
Lakas–Kampi	190,350	13.69	1
Nacionalista	144,510	10.40	1
PDP–Laban	140,416	10.10	1
Nationalist People's Coalition	37,990	2.73	0
PMP	17,453	1.26	0
Independent	35,567	2.56	0
Ex officio seats			3
Total	1,389,946	100.00	13

==== 1st District ====
2010 Provincial Board Election at Quezon's 1st District
Party	Candidate	Votes	%
Liberal	Teresita Dator	90,137	30.26
Liberal	Alona Villamayor-Obispo	89,691	30.11
Lakas–Kampi	Noel Angelo Devanadera	80,628	27.07
Nacionalista	Evelyn Abeja	26,933	9.04
Independent	Rustico Laurel	6,329	2.12
Lakas–Kampi	Ma. Janet Buelo	2,512	0.84
Independent	Elmer Litana	1,636	0.55
Total votes		297,866	100.00

==== 2nd District ====
2010 Provincial Board Election at Quezon's 2nd District
Party	Candidate	Votes	%
PDP–Laban	Romano Talaga	135,416	24.19
Liberal	Gary Jason Ejercito	125,510	22.10
Liberal	Ferdinand Talabong	120,276	21.48
Liberal	Antonio Año Punzalan	99,758	17.82
Independent	Liza Alvarez	53,436	9.54
PMP	Jose Ona, Jr.	17,453	3.12
Independent	Artemio Garcia	4,911	0.88
Independent	Reynieto Anareta	1,659	1.30
Independent	Nelson Traquena	1,487	0.27
Total votes		559,906	100.00

==== 3rd District ====
2010 Provincial Board Election at Quezon's 3rd District
Party	Candidate	Votes	%
Lakas–Kampi	Lourdes de Luna-Pasatiempo	77,076	38.54
Nacionalista	Victor Reyes	47,262	23.63
Lakas–Kampi	Dominador Villena, Jr.	30,134	15.07
Liberal	Federico Aguilar	20,600	10.30
Liberal	Reynante Arrogancia	13,941	6.97
Independent	Jose Pasia	7,299	3.65
PDP–Laban	Virgilio Fernandez	3,661	1.83
Total votes		199,973	100.00

==== 4th District ====
2010 Provincial Board Election at Quezon's 4th District
Party	Candidate	Votes	%
Liberal	Manuel Butardo	69,101	17.92
Liberal	Gerald Ortiz	60,354	15.65
Liberal	Rachel Ubana	53,591	13.90
Liberal	Rhodora Tan	52,374	13.58
Nacionalista	Narciso Malite	51,054	13.24
Liberal	Carmela Josefa Lavides	28,327	7.35
NPC	Maria Teresa Diestro	21,588	5.60
Nacionalista	Francis Jose Rodelas	19,201	4.98
NPC	Fidencio Salumbides	16,405	4.25
Independent	Emmanuel Mapaye	5,214	1.35
Independent	Damian Guerrero	3,354	0.87
Independent	Nelson Barreto	2,702	0.70
PDP–Laban	Marcil Guay	1,339	0.35
Independent	Jose Cereza, Jr.	976	0.25
Total votes		385,580	100.00

== Congressional elections ==
=== 1st District ===
Incumbent representative Wilfrido Mark Enverga is running for his second term.

2010 Philippine House of Representatives election at Quezon's 1st district
Party	Candidate	Votes	%
Nacionalista	Wilfrido Mark Enverga	109,508	56.20
Lakas–Kampi	Agnes Vicenta Devanadera	82,908	42.55
PGRP	Gregorio Cabigan	1,564	0.80
Independent	Rolando de Tena	861	0.44
Total votes		194,841	100.00
Nacionalista hold			

=== 2nd District ===
2010 Philippine House of Representatives election at Quezon's 2nd district
Party	Candidate	Votes	%
Liberal	Irvin Alcala	170,670	74.51
Nacionalista	James Rey Bico	40,260	17.57
PMP	Bernard Tagarao	18,169	7.93
Total votes		229,099	100.00
Liberal hold			

=== 3rd District ===
Incumbent representative Danilo Suarez will face former governor Eduardo Rodriguez.

2010 Philippine House of Representatives election at Quezon's 3rd district
Party	Candidate	Votes	%
Lakas–Kampi	Danilo Suarez	112,687	79.69
Liberal	Eduardo Rodriguez	27,790	19.65
Independent	Rebecca de la Rosa	924	0.65
Total votes		141,401	100.00
Lakas–Kampi hold			

=== 4th District ===
Incumbent representative Lorenzo Tañada III is running unopposed.

2010 Philippine House of Representatives election at Quezon's 4th district
Party	Candidate	Votes	%
Liberal	Lorenzo Tañada III	148,226	100.00
Total votes		148,226	100.00
Liberal hold			

== Lucena local elections ==
=== Mayoral election ===
Lucena mayoral election
Party	Candidate	Votes	%
Lakas–Kampi	Ramon Talaga, Jr.	44,099	51.12
Liberal	Philip Castillo	39,615	45.92
LM	Simon Aldovino	2,375	2.75
Independent	Edna Seralde	99	0.11
Independent	Romeo Amposta	74	0.09
Total votes		86,262	100.00
Lakas–Kampi hold			

=== Vice Mayoral election ===
Lucena vice mayoral election
Party	Candidate	Votes	%
Liberal	Roderick Alcala	46,175	54.49
Nacionalista	Clarinda Cabana	37,553	44.41
Independent	German Alemania	742	0.88
Independent	Francisco Tan	277	0.33
Total votes		84,747	100.00
Liberal hold			

== Sources ==
- Philippines 2010 Election Results – Quezon
