= Duhat, Philippines =

Duhat, Philippines, may refer to various barangays in the Philippines:

- Duhat, an urban barangay in Cavinti, Laguna Province
- Duhat, a barangay in Padre Burgos, Quezon, Quezon province
- Duhat, a barangay in Plaridel, Quezon, Quezon province
- Duhat, a barangay in Santa Cruz, Laguna, Laguna Province
- Duhat, a barangay in Bocaue, Bulacan Province
