= David Suarez (politician) =

Filipino politician

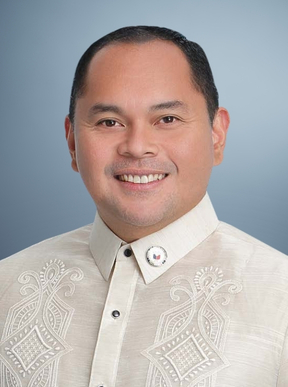
- Official portrait, 2025

Deputy Speaker of the House of Representatives of the Philippines
- Incumbent
- Assumed office November 19, 2025
- Speaker: Bojie Dy
- In office January 22, 2024 – June 30, 2025
- Speaker: Martin Romualdez

Senior Deputy Speaker of the House of Representatives of the Philippines
- In office July 28, 2025 – November 19, 2025
- Speaker: Martin Romualdez; Bojie Dy
- Preceded by: Aurelio Gonzales Jr.
- Succeeded by: Dinand Hernandez

Member of the Philippine House of Representatives from Quezon's 2nd district
- Incumbent
- Assumed office June 30, 2019
- Preceded by: Vicente Alcala

29th Governor of Quezon
- In office June 30, 2010 – June 30, 2019
- Vice Governor: Vicente Alcala (2010–2013); Samuel Nantes (2013–2019)
- Preceded by: Kelly Portes (Acting)
- Succeeded by: Danilo Suarez

Vice Governor of Quezon
- In office June 30, 2004 – June 30, 2007
- Governor: Wilfrido Enverga
- Preceded by: Jovito Talabong
- Succeeded by: Kelly Portes

Member of the Unisan Municipal Council
- In office June 30, 2001 – June 30, 2004

Personal details
- Born: January 25, 1977 (age 49) Makati, Philippines
- Party: Lakas (2001–2007, 2008–2011; 2022–present)
- Other political affiliations: KAMPI (2007–2008); NUP (2011–2017); Nacionalista (2017–2022)
- Spouse: Anna Marie Villaraza
- Children: 3
- Parents: Danilo Suarez (father); Aleta Suarez (mother)
- Education: University of Asia and the Pacific
- Nickname: Jay-Jay

David "Jay-Jay" Catarina Suarez (born January 25, 1977) is a Filipino politician who has served as the representative for Quezon's second district since 2019. He previously served as governor of Quezon from 2010 to 2019, vice governor of Quezon from 2004 to 2007, and councilor of Unisan from 2001 to 2004.

Suarez is the youngest child of former Quezon Governor Danilo Suarez and former Representative Aleta Suarez.

== Education ==
Suarez attended the University of Asia and the Pacific where he attained a degree in Bachelor of Arts, specializing in Economics, Philosophy and Politics. He also had training in other educational institutes at the University of the Philippines Diliman, where he had a short course on Local Legislation and on Local Governance and Public Management. He also finished a training on Public Administration at the International Academy for Leadership in Gummersbach, Germany.

== Political career ==
Suarez was elected as a Municipal Councilor of Unisan, Quezon, a post which he served from 2001 to 2004. He also concurrently served as the President of Philippine Councilor's League Quezon Federation, a post which he was elected to also from 2001 to 2004. From 2004 to 2007, Suarez served as the Vice Governor of Quezon . At the Department of Environment and Natural Resources from 2007 to 2009, Suarez was Assistant Secretary who was tasked to oversee the River Basin Control Office, while he also served as program manager of the government body for South Luzon.

Suarez was elected as Governor in 2010; he was re-elected in 2013 and in 2016. In 2018, he transferred his residence to Tiaong.

In 2019, he was elected representative of the Quezon's second district. He was reelected in 2022 and rejoined Lakas–CMD ahead of the 19th Congress. On January 29, 2024, Suarez was named as a Deputy Speaker, replacing Ralph Recto (Batangas–6th), who had left the House to become Finance Secretary. He was re-elected in 2025 to his third term unopposed.

== Personal life ==
He is married to ALONA Partylist Representative Anna Villaraza, with whom he has three children.

== Election results ==
=== 2025 ===
2025 Philippine House of Representatives elections
Party	Candidate	Votes	%
Lakas	David Suarez	286,091	100.00
Total votes		286,091	100.00
Lakas hold			

=== 2022 ===
2022 Philippine House of Representatives elections
Party	Candidate	Votes	%
Nacionalista	David Suarez	207,836	52.93
NPC	Proceso Alcala	173,639	44.22
Reporma	Antonio Punzalan	6,038	1.54
Independent	Abigail Jashael Bagabaldo	3,129	0.80
Independent	Alejandro Nebu	2,026	0.52
Total votes		392,668	100.00
Nacionalista hold			

=== 2019 ===
2019 Philippine House of Representatives elections
Party	Candidate	Votes	%
Nacionalista	David Suarez	171,903	
Liberal	Proceso Alcala	120,998	
Aksyon	Amadeo Suarez	2,699	
PFP	Boyet Masilang	3,957	
DPP	Christian Señeres	1,076	
Margin of victory			
Rejected ballots			
Turnout			
Nacionalista gain from PDP–Laban			

=== 2016 ===
Quezon Gubernatorial Election
Party	Candidate	Votes	%
NUP	David Suarez	744,796	97.10
LM	Teodorico Gonzales	7,486	1.00
Independent	Rolando Merano	6,864	0.90
Independent	Danny Pasatiempo	4,093	0.50
Independent	Reynolfo Raquepo	3,946	0.50
Margin of victory		763,239	100.00
Invalid or blank votes			
Total votes		763,239	100.00
NUP hold			

=== 2013 ===
Quezon Gubernatorial Election
Party	Candidate	Votes	%
NUP	David Suarez	279,372	48.48
Liberal	Irvin Alcala	244,600	42.44
Independent	Rolando Merano	1,992	0.35
Margin of victory		34,772	6.03%
Invalid or blank votes		50,327	8.73
Total votes		576,291	100.00
NUP hold			

=== 2010 ===
Quezon gubernatorial election
Party	Candidate	Votes	%
Lakas–Kampi	David Suarez	397,858	53.84
Liberal	Rafael Nantes	333,292	45.11
Independent	Rolando Rafa	2,532	0.34
Independent	Hobart Dator, Jr.	2,459	0.33
PGRP	Eduardo Cuenca	1,218	0.16
Independent	Buenaventura Pumarega	853	0.12
Independent	Glaceria Sta. Maria	695	0.09
Total votes		738,907	100.00
Lakas–Kampi gain from Liberal			
