= Anna Suarez =

Filipina politician (born 1980)

Anna Villaraza-Suarez
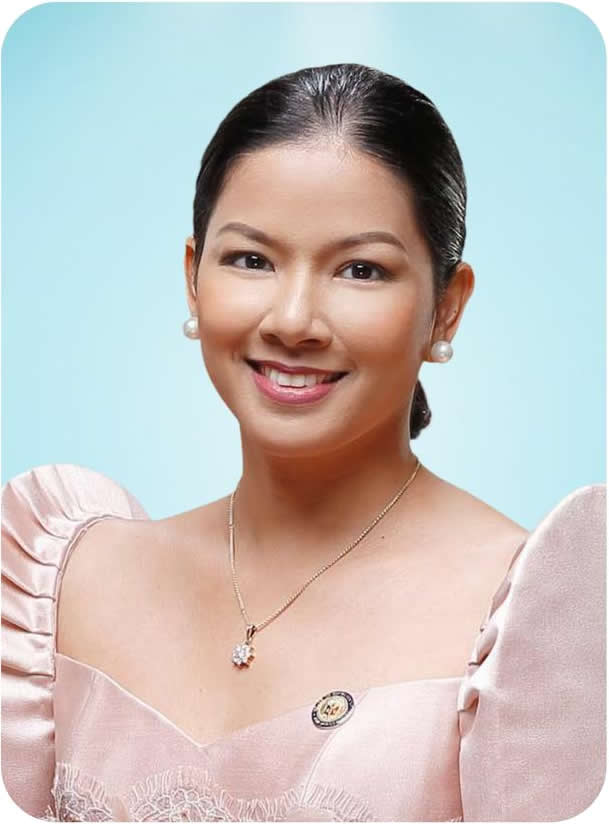
- Official portrait, 2022

Member of the Philippine House of Representatives for ALONA
- In office June 30, 2016 – June 30, 2025
- Preceded by: Position created
- Succeeded by: Maria Cristina Lopez

Personal details
- Born: Anna Marie Villaraza; August 26, 1980 (age 45) Tiaong, Quezon, Philippines
- Party: ALONA (since 2015)
- Spouse: David Suarez
- Children: 3
- Occupation: Politician
- Website: Hon. Villaraza-Suarez, Anna Marie

Anna Marie Villaraza-Suarez is a Filipina politician who served as Member of the Philippine House of Representatives for ALONA Partylist from 2016 to 2025.

== Political career ==
In 2015 she filed her certificate of candidacy for ALONA Partylist and became the 1st nominee for the 2016 House elections and again in 2019 and 2022, and now she was in her 3rd and final term.
