= 2016 Quezon local elections =

Philippine election

2016 Quezon gubernatorial election
- May 9, 2016
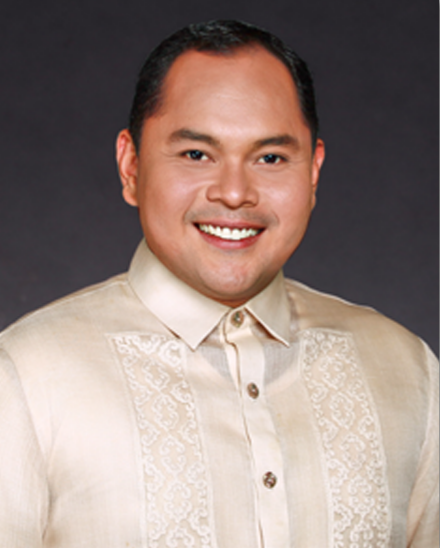
Nominee	David Suarez
Party	NUP	Liberal
Running mate	Anacleto Alcala Jr.	Samuel Nantes
Popular vote	744,796
Percentage	97.10
- Results per municipality and city
Governor before election
David C. Suarez
NUP
Elected Governor
David C. Suarez
NUP

Local elections were held in the Province of Quezon on May 9, 2016 as part of the 2016 general election. Voters will select candidates for all local positions: a town mayor, vice mayor and town councilors, as well as members of the Sangguniang Panlalawigan, the vice-governor, governor and representatives for the four districts of Quezon.

== Provincial elections ==
The candidates for governor and vice governor with the highest number of votes wins the seat; they are voted separately, therefore, they may be of different parties when elected.

=== Gubernatorial election ===
Parties are as stated in their certificate of candidacies.

David Suarez is the incumbent.

Quezon Gubernatorial Election
Party	Candidate	Votes	%
NUP	David Suarez	744,796	97.10
LM	Teodorico Gonzales	7,486	1.00
Independent	Rolando Merano	6,864	0.90
Independent	Danny Pasatiempo	4,093	0.50
Independent	Reynolfo Raquepo	3,946	0.50
Margin of victory		763,239	100.00
Invalid or blank votes			
Total votes		763,239	100.00

=== Vice-gubernatorial election ===
Parties are as stated in their certificate of candidacies.

Samuel Nantes is the incumbent.

Quezon Gubernatorial Election
Party	Candidate	Votes	%
Liberal	Samuel Nantes	426,197	55.30
NUP	Anacleto Alcala Jr.	195,507	25.40
PMP	Gary Ejercito Estrada	149,316	19.40
Margin of victory		771,020	100.00
Invalid or blank votes			
Total votes		771,020	100.00

== Congressional elections ==
=== 1st District ===
Wilfredo Mark Enverga is term-limited. His sister, Trina Enverga-Dela Paz, will run for congressman.

2013 Philippine House of Representatives election at Quezon's 1st district
Party	Candidate	Votes	%
NPC	Trina Enverga	88,442	43.50
Liberal	Irvin Alcala	83,793	41.20
UNA	Teresita Dator	25,418	12.50
PDP–Laban	Carlos Portes	5,643	2.80
Margin of victory			
Rejected ballots			
Turnout			

=== 2nd District ===
2013 Philippine House of Representatives election at Quezon's 2nd district
Party	Candidate	Votes	%
Liberal	Vicente Alcala	174,578	64.40
Independent	Rosauro Masilang	85,945	31.70
Independent	Vivencio Escueta	16,245	3.90
Margin of victory			
Rejected ballots			
Turnout			

=== 3rd District ===
2013 Philippine House of Representatives election at Quezon's 3rd district
Party	Candidate	Votes	%
Lakas	Danilo Suarez	124,963	100.00
Margin of victory			
Rejected ballots			
Turnout		124,96	100.00

=== 4th District ===
2013 Philippine House of Representatives election at Quezon's 4th district
Party	Candidate	Votes	%
NPC	Angelina Tan	129,772	70.20
Liberal	Lorenzo Tañada III	53,265	28.80
Independent	Armando Mendoza	1,562	0.80
Independent	Marcil Guay	194	0.10
Margin of victory			
Rejected ballots			
Turnout			

== Provincial board elections ==
=== 1st District ===
Quezon Provincial Board Members
Party	Candidate	Votes	%
NUP	Jerry Talaga	98,218	
Liberal	Aileen Buan	53,119	
NUP	Ayela Deveza	43,600	
NPC	Ricky Dator	30,978	
Margin of victory			
Rejected ballots			
Turnout			

=== 2nd District ===
Quezon Provincial Board Members
Party	Candidate	Votes	%
Liberal	Beth Sio	163,615	
NUP	Bong Talabong	149,150	
Liberal	Hermilando Alcala	107,660	
Liberal	Jonas Bryson Atienza	72,815	
Independent	Felix Avillo	58,270	
Margin of victory			
Rejected ballots			
Turnout			

=== 3rd District ===
Quezon Provincial Board Members
Party	Candidate	Votes	%
UNA	Donaldo Suarez	93,921	
Nacionalista	Dominic Reyes	62,075	
Liberal	Reynante Arrogancia	45,441	
Independent	Rodolfo Orfanel	27,937	
Margin of victory			
Rejected ballots			
Turnout			

=== 4th District ===
Quezon Provincial Board Members
Party	Candidate	Votes	%
NUP	Isaias Ubaña	96,130	
Liberal	Rhodora Tan	77,522	
NUP	Raquel Mendoza	75,634	
NPC	John Francis Luzano	21,912	
Liberal	Celso Arit	34,236	
Liberal	Renato Sarmiento	23,426	
Margin of victory			
Rejected ballots			
Turnout			

== Lucena local elections ==
This refers to the candidates and winners of the 2016 election in the highly-urbanized city of Lucena, independent from the province.

=== Mayoralty elections ===
Mayor Roderick Alcala and Vice Mayor Philip Castillo is the incumbent.

Lucena City mayoralty election
Party	Candidate	Votes	%
Liberal	Roderick Alcala	68,704	62.8
UNA	Ramon Talaga, Jr.	40,184	36.7
Independent	Rolando Rafa	281	0.3
Independent	Benjamin Ando	269	0.2
Total votes		109,438	100.00

Lucena vice mayoralty election
Party	Candidate	Votes	%
Liberal	Philip Castillo	59,492	58.1
UNA	Danny Faller	42,937	41.9
Total votes		102,429	100.00

=== City council elections ===
Lucena City Council election
Party	Candidate	Votes	%
Liberal	Anacleto Alcala III	63,795	
Liberal	Sunshine Abcede	58,476	
Liberal	William Noche	56,943	
Liberal	Boyet Alejandrino	55,500	
UNA	Ramil Talaga	54,864	
Liberal	Nick Pedro	54,169	
Liberal	Dan Zaballero	53,265	
Liberal	Benny Brizuela	53,001	
UNA	Nilo Villapando	52,897	
Liberal	Vic Paulo	46,840	
UNA	Christian Ona	42,412	
Liberal	Rogelio Traqueña	41,270	
Liberal	German Ver Castillo	38,373	
UNA	Nonoy Libozada	36,269	
UNA	Simon Aldovino	30,426	
UNA	Mike Dalida	29,130	
UNA	Jun Buenaflor	28,073	
UNA	Amaury Polintan	17,284	
UNA	Rogelio Rances	16,352	
Total votes		829,339	100.00
