= Quezon's 3rd congressional district =

Congressional district in Quezon Province, Philippines

3rd Congressional District of Quezon Province
- Constituency for the House of Representatives of the Philippines
- Boundary of Quezon's 3rd congressional district in Quezon

- Location of Quezon within the Philippines
- Province: Quezon
- Region: Region IV-A (Calabarzon)
- Population: 446,711 (2020)
- Electorate: 290,045 (2022)
- Major settlements: 12 Municipalities: Agdangan; Buenavista; Catanauan; General Luna; Macalelon; Mulanay; Padre Burgos; Pitogo; San Andres; San Francisco (Aurora); San Narciso; Unisan

Current constituency
- Created: 1987
- Party: NPC; Stan Q
- Representative: Reynante U. Arrogancia
- Created from: Quezon-2
- Congressional Bloc: Majority

Quezon's 3rd congressional district, also known as the Bondoc Peninsula, is one of the four congressional districts of the Philippines in the province of Quezon, formerly Tayabas. It has been represented in the House of Representatives of the Philippines since 1987. The district consists of municipalities in the Bondoc Peninsula, the southern part of Tayabas Isthmus and southwest coast of Ragay Gulf, namely Agdangan, Buenavista, Catanauan, General Luna, Macalelon, Mulanay, Padre Burgos, Pitogo, San Andres, San Francisco, San Narciso and Unisan. It is currently represented in the 20th Congress by Reynante Arrogancia of the Nationalist People's Coalition and Stand Up Quezon.

== Representation history ==
#	Image	Member	Term of office		Legislature	Party	Electoral history	Constituency
#	Image	Member	Start	End	Legislature	Party	Electoral history	Constituency
District created February 2, 1987.
1		Bienvenido O. Marquez Jr.	June 30, 1987	June 30, 1992	8th	UNIDO	Elected in 1987.	1987–present Agdangan, Buenavista, Catanauan, General Luna, Macalelon, Mulanay, Padre Burgos, Pitogo, San Andres, San Francisco, San Narciso, Unisan
2		Danilo Suarez	June 30, 1992	June 30, 2001	9th	Liberal	Elected in 1992.	1987–present Agdangan, Buenavista, Catanauan, General Luna, Macalelon, Mulanay, Padre Burgos, Pitogo, San Andres, San Francisco, San Narciso, Unisan
2		Danilo Suarez	June 30, 1992	June 30, 2001	10th	Liberal	Re-elected in 1995.	1987–present Agdangan, Buenavista, Catanauan, General Luna, Macalelon, Mulanay, Padre Burgos, Pitogo, San Andres, San Francisco, San Narciso, Unisan
2		Danilo Suarez	June 30, 1992	June 30, 2001	11th	Liberal	Re-elected in 1998.	1987–present Agdangan, Buenavista, Catanauan, General Luna, Macalelon, Mulanay, Padre Burgos, Pitogo, San Andres, San Francisco, San Narciso, Unisan
3		Aleta Suarez	June 30, 2001	June 30, 2004	12th	PMP	Elected in 2001.	1987–present Agdangan, Buenavista, Catanauan, General Luna, Macalelon, Mulanay, Padre Burgos, Pitogo, San Andres, San Francisco, San Narciso, Unisan
(2)		Danilo Suarez	June 30, 2004	June 30, 2013	13th	Liberal	Elected in 2004.	1987–present Agdangan, Buenavista, Catanauan, General Luna, Macalelon, Mulanay, Padre Burgos, Pitogo, San Andres, San Francisco, San Narciso, Unisan
(2)		Danilo Suarez	June 30, 2004	June 30, 2013	14th	Lakas	Re-elected in 2007.	1987–present Agdangan, Buenavista, Catanauan, General Luna, Macalelon, Mulanay, Padre Burgos, Pitogo, San Andres, San Francisco, San Narciso, Unisan
(2)		Danilo Suarez	June 30, 2004	June 30, 2013	15th	Lakas	Re-elected in 2010.	1987–present Agdangan, Buenavista, Catanauan, General Luna, Macalelon, Mulanay, Padre Burgos, Pitogo, San Andres, San Francisco, San Narciso, Unisan
(3)		Aleta Suarez	June 30, 2013	June 30, 2016	16th	Lakas	Elected in 2013.	1987–present Agdangan, Buenavista, Catanauan, General Luna, Macalelon, Mulanay, Padre Burgos, Pitogo, San Andres, San Francisco, San Narciso, Unisan
(2)		Danilo Suarez	June 30, 2016	June 30, 2019	17th	Lakas	Elected in 2016.	1987–present Agdangan, Buenavista, Catanauan, General Luna, Macalelon, Mulanay, Padre Burgos, Pitogo, San Andres, San Francisco, San Narciso, Unisan
(3)		Aleta Suarez	June 30, 2019	June 30, 2022	18th	Lakas	Elected in 2019.	1987–present Agdangan, Buenavista, Catanauan, General Luna, Macalelon, Mulanay, Padre Burgos, Pitogo, San Andres, San Francisco, San Narciso, Unisan
4		Reynante Arrogancia	June 30, 2022	Incumbent	19th	Reporma	Elected in 2022.	1987–present Agdangan, Buenavista, Catanauan, General Luna, Macalelon, Mulanay, Padre Burgos, Pitogo, San Andres, San Francisco, San Narciso, Unisan
4		Reynante Arrogancia	June 30, 2022	Incumbent	20th	NPC (Stan Q)	Re-elected in 2025.	1987–present Agdangan, Buenavista, Catanauan, General Luna, Macalelon, Mulanay, Padre Burgos, Pitogo, San Andres, San Francisco, San Narciso, Unisan

== Election results ==
=== 2025 ===
2025 Philippine House of Representatives election at Quezon's 3rd district
Party	Candidate	Votes	%
NPC	Reynante Arrogancia	163,239	69.55
Independent	Matt Florido	71,645	30.45
Rejected ballots		18,753	7.4
Turnout		253,457	83.34
Registered electors		304,144	
NPC hold			
Source: Commission on Elections

=== 2022 ===
2022 Philippine House of Representatives elections
Party	Candidate	Votes	%
Reporma	Reynante Arrogancia	122,379	58.47
Lakas	Aleta Suarez	76,174	36.39
WPP	Ruel Arogante	7,794	3.72
PRP	Analyn Suarez	2,966	1.42
Total votes		209,313	100.00
Reporma gain from Lakas			

=== 2019 ===
2019 Philippine House of Representatives elections
Party	Candidate	Votes	%
Lakas	Aleta Suarez	130,982	84.27
Aksyon	Ronnie De Luna	24,448	15.73
Total votes		155,430	100.00
Lakas hold			

=== 2016 ===
2016 Philippine House of Representatives elections
Party	Candidate	Votes	%
UNA	Danilo Suarez	124,963	100.00
Total votes		124,963	100.00
UNA gain from Lakas			

== See also ==
- Legislative districts of Quezon
