= Proceso Alcala =

Filipino politician

The Honorable Proceso Alcala
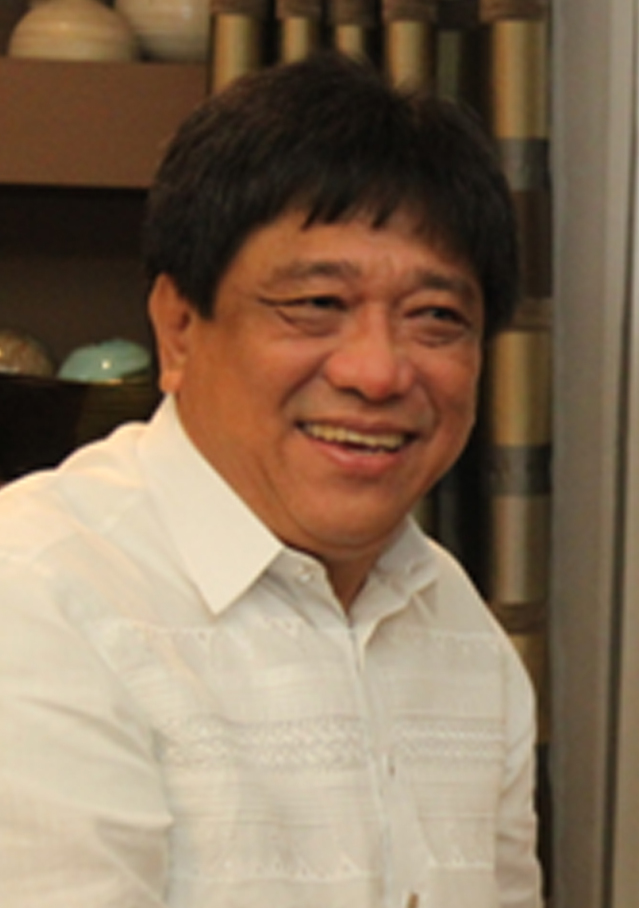
- Alcala in June 2014

Secretary of Agriculture
- In office June 30, 2010 – June 30, 2016
- President: Benigno S. Aquino III
- Preceded by: Bernardo Fondevilla (acting)
- Succeeded by: Emmanuel Piñol

Member of the House of Representatives from Quezon's 2nd district
- In office June 30, 2004 – June 30, 2010
- Preceded by: Lynnette Punzalan
- Succeeded by: Irvin Alcala

Personal details
- Born: Proceso Jaraza Alcala; July 2, 1955 (age 71) Lucena, Quezon, Philippines
- Party: NPC (2021–present)
- Other political affiliations: Liberal (2004-2021)
- Spouse: Corazon Asuncion Maaño
- Children: 3
- Education: Luzonian University Foundation (BS)
- Occupation: Politician, environmentalist
- Profession: Civil Engineer
- Nickname: Procy

Proceso Jaraza Alcala (born July 2, 1955), popularly known as "Procy" in his home province, is a Filipino politician. He is the longest serving Secretary of the Department of Agriculture, holding the position from 2010 to 2016 encompassing the entire term of President Benigno Aquino III. He was a two-term congressman of the 2nd District of Quezon Province from 2004 to 2010.

== Education ==
- Elementary : Lucena South Elementary School (1962-1968)
- Secondary : Lucena City National High School (1968-1972)
- College : Luzonian University Foundation; Bachelor of Science in Civil Engineering (1972-1978)

== Political career ==
Alcala first served as a two-term congressman of the 2nd district of Quezon Province from 2004 to 2010. He is one of the principal authors of the Organic Agriculture Act of 2010 (RA 10068) and Mounts Banahaw-San Cristobal Protected Landscape Act (RA 2718). He was also a co-author of the Climate Change Act (RA 9729) and the Expanded Senior Citizens Act (RA 9994). He is an environmentalist and a non-government organization worker.

According to his curriculum vitae, Alcala pursued relentlessly his advocacy for and dedication to agricultural development, particularly organic agriculture in the Congress.

In 2010, President Benigno S. Aquino III appointed Alcala to the Agriculture secretary post, serving until 2016. Alcala was the highest paid Cabinet member, based on the 2013 report of salaries and allowances released by the Commission on Audit.

In 2019, almost three years after stepping down as Agriculture secretary, he attempted a comeback to the Congress, running for the 2nd district of Quezon. However, he lost to outgoing Governor David Suarez. He sought another comeback to the Congress in 2022, this time under the Nationalist People's Coalition, but lost to Suarez once again.

House of Representatives of the Philippines
| Preceded by Lynnette Punzalan | Congressman, 2nd District of Quezon; 2004 – 2010 | Succeeded by Irvin Alcala |
Political offices
| Preceded by Bernardo Fondevilla (Acting) | Secretary of Agriculture; 2010 – 2016 | Succeeded by Emmanuel Piñol |
