= Aleta Suarez =

Filipina politician (born 1946)

The Honorable Aleta Suarez

Member of the Philippine House of Representatives from Quezon's 3rd District
- In office June 30, 2019 – June 30, 2022
- Preceded by: Danilo Suarez
- Succeeded by: Reynante Arrogancia
- In office June 30, 2013 – June 30, 2016
- Preceded by: Danilo Suarez
- Succeeded by: Danilo Suarez
- In office June 30, 2001 – June 30, 2004
- Preceded by: Danilo Suarez
- Succeeded by: Danilo Suarez

Personal details
- Born: Aleta Rodriguez Catarina Lucena, Tayabas, Philippines
- Party: Lakas-CMD (2019–present, 2013–2016)
- Other political affiliations: PMP (2001–2004)
- Spouse: Danilo Suarez (m. 1969)
- Children: 5 (including Donaldo, David)

Aleta Catarina Suarez (born Aleta Rodriguez Catarina) is a Filipina politician who last served as Member of the Philippine House of Representatives from Quezon's 3rd District, a position she held thrice from 2001–2004, 2013–2016, and 2019–2022. She is married to the former Governor Danilo Suarez and the mother of incumbent 2nd District Representative David C. Suarez.

== Personal life ==
She married Danilo Suarez in 1969, at a church wedding ceremony in Ermita, Manila. Together, they have five children including David. They also have eight grandchildren as of 2019.
