= Reynante Arrogancia =

Filipino politician (born 1972)

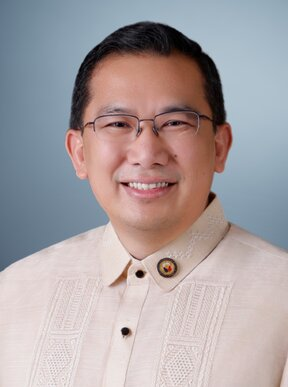
- Official portrait, 2025

Member of the House of Representatives from Quezon’s 3rd district
- Incumbent
- Assumed office June 30, 2022
- Preceded by: Aleta Suarez

Member of the Quezon Provincial Board from the 3rd District
- In office June 30, 2019 – June 30, 2022 Serving with Jet Suarez

Personal details
- Born: Reynante Uy Arrogancia; January 19, 1972 (age 54) Unisan, Quezon, Philippines
- Party: NPC (2024–present); Stan Q (local party; 2024–present)
- Other political affiliations: Reporma (2021–2024); Independent (2018–2021); Liberal (2009–2018)
- Education: PMI Colleges
- Occupation: Politician

Reynante "Reynan" Uy Arrogancia (born January 19, 1972) is a Filipino politician. He has represented the 3rd District of Quezon in the House of Representatives of the Philippines since 2022.

== Early life and education ==
Arrogancia was born on January 19, 1972 in Unisan. He studied at Caigdal National High School for his secondary education. He studied PMI Colleges for his tertiary education.

== Political career ==
=== Quezon Provincial Board election bids ===
In 2010, Arrogancia ran as member of the Quezon Provincial Board but he lost to obtain a seat.

In 2013, Arrogancia ran again as member of the Quezon Provincial Board but he lost to obtain a seat for second time.

In 2016, Arrogancia ran again as member of the Quezon Provincial Board but he lost to obtain a seat for third time.

=== Board Member (2019–2022) ===
In 2019, Arrogancia was a member of the Quezon Provincial Board until 2022.

=== House of Representatives (2025–present) ===
In 2022, Arrogancia was elected as representative for third district of Quezon after he beat Aleta Suarez with a majority of 46,205 votes. He is the first person outside of the Suarez family to hold the seat since Bienvenido Marquez Jr. from 1987 to 1992. He was re-elected in 2025.

== Electoral history ==
Electoral history of Reynante Arrogancia
Year	Office	Party		Votes received				Result
Year	Office	Local	National	Total	%	P.	Swing	Result
2010	Board Member (Quezon–3rd)	—N/a	Liberal	13,941	6.97%	5th	—N/a	Lost
2013	Board Member (Quezon–3rd)	—N/a	Liberal	25,795	—N/a	4th	—N/a	Lost
2016	Board Member (Quezon–3rd)	—N/a	Liberal	45,441	—N/a	3rd	—N/a	Lost
2019	Board Member (Quezon–3rd)	—N/a	Independent	84,742	—N/a	2nd	—N/a	Won
2022	Representative (Quezon–3rd)	—N/a	Reporma	122,379	58.47%	1st	—N/a	Won
2025	Representative (Quezon–3rd)	Stan Q	NPC	163,239	69.55%	1st	—N/a	Won
