= Agdangan =

Municipality in Quezon, Philippines

- Municipality
- Municipality of Agdangan
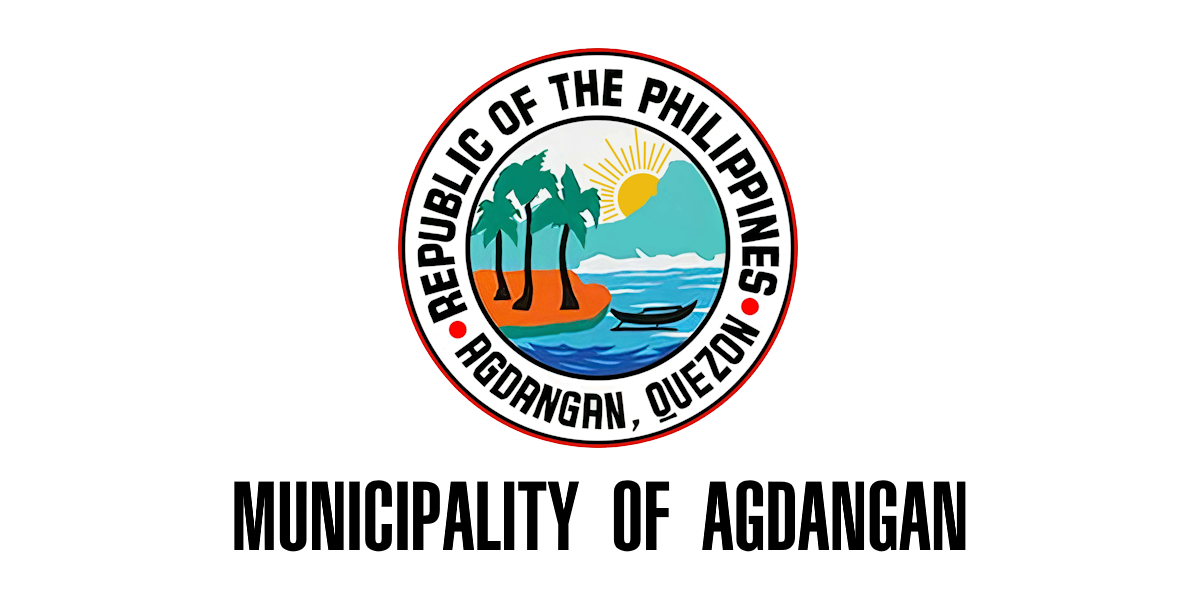
- Flag

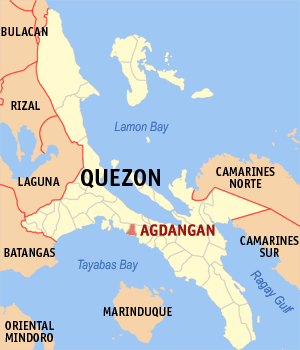
- Map of Quezon with Agdangan highlighted
- Interactive map of Agdangan
- Location within the Philippines
- Coordinates: 13°52′33″N 121°54′44″E
- Country: Philippines
- Region: Calabarzon
- Province: Quezon
- District: 3rd district
- Founded: April 1, 1939
- Barangays: 12 (see Barangays)

Government
  - Type: Sangguniang Bayan
  - Mayor: Rhadam P. Aguilar
  - Vice Mayor: Carlo A. Salvador
  - Representative: Reynante U. Arrogancia
  - Municipal Council: Members: Ma. Nadine M. Sawal; Hannah Zhane A. Huraño; Gerardo R. Jimenez; Eulogio C. Caig; Melecin V. Villaruel; Sherryliene T. Par; Edilberto M. Lancion; Lucila V. Siudad
  - Electorate: 9,696 voters (2025)

Area
  - Total: 31.54 km^{2} (12.18 sq mi)
- Elevation: 24 m (79 ft)
- Highest elevation: 211 m (692 ft)
- Lowest elevation: 0 m (0 ft)

Population (2024 census)
  - Total: 13,316
  - Density: 422.2/km^{2} (1,093/sq mi)
  - Households: 3,350
- Demonym: Agdanganin

Economy
  - Income class: 5th municipal income class
  - Poverty incidence: 7.78% (2023)
  - Revenue: ₱ 96.18 million (2024)
  - Assets: ₱ 266.4 million (2024)
  - Expenditure: ₱ 28.77 million (2024)
  - Liabilities: ₱ 36.61 million (2024)

Service provider
  - Electricity: Quezon 1 Electric Cooperative (QUEZELCO 1)
- Time zone: UTC+8 (PST)
- ZIP code: 4304
- PSGC: 0405601000
- IDD : area code: +63 (0)42
- Native languages: Tagalog

Agdangan, officially the Municipality of Agdangan (Tagalog: Bayan ng Agdangan), is a municipality in the province of Quezon, Philippines. According to the 2024 census, it has a population of 13,316 people.

== Etymology ==
This place got its name from the word hagdanan, a Tagalog word for stairs. It was a former barrio of the nearby town Unisan of the then Tayabas province.

== History ==
In the 18th and 19th centuries, during the Spanish Colonial era, Atimonan was suffering from frequent attacks by pirates and outlaws. A man named Mariano Aguilar thought of moving to a safer place to live and dwell with his family. He asked a friend and distant relative, Juan Salvador to help him find a nearby peaceful place to settle. Along with their immediate families, they walked through the forest south-west bound until they found a clean river. While traversing the riverside, they found a scenic body of water which was best described as ladder-like as the waters run over ladder-like steps.

They initially named the place Hagdan-hagdan (ladder-like structure). This majestic scenery nowadays is a local tourist attraction that can be found in Barangay Dayap. As they moved further west, they found a huge, serene and attractive flat land area where they later established the town proper. In this land, they built houses for their families and divided the land area between their family members, relatives and friends. The population in this newly discovered area had increased dramatically and before the end of the 19th century.

As time went by, the two families realized that there was a pressing need to build a church, school buildings, marketplace, the government building and other facilities basic to the community. The Salvador family donated the site for the school buildings and the public cemetery while the Aguilars donated the sites for the Roman Catholic Church, the marketplace and the municipal building.

The population increased further as a result of influx of people from nearby municipalities and provinces adjacent to Tayabas (now Quezon province). The Philippine National Railways established a permanent train station which also contributed to the migration of people to this place.

=== Foundation ===
The Aguilar and Salvador families, along with other migrant families such as Garin, Banal, Mapaye, Trinidad and Urgino with the help of local civic organization led by Pedro Olase, again took proactive efforts to gain independence from Unisan. Their actions led to the foundation of the municipality of Agdangan. The culmination of this endeavor happened on April 1, 1939, when President Manuel L. Quezon signed Executive Order No. 185, creating the municipality. It consisted of the barrios of Agdangan, Binagbag, Calutan, Dayap, Ibabang Kinagunau, Ilayang Kinagunan, Maligaya, and Sildura, all former parts of the town of Unisan. April 1 has been commemorated in honor of the town's foundation day and is commonly known as Agdangan Day.

President Quezon appointed Roque M. Aguilar, the eldest son of Mariano Aguilar, as Mayor until the first election was held in 1940, where his youngest brother Catalino Aguilar was elected Mayor along with Crispin Salvador as Vice Mayor.

== Geography ==
Agdangan is 48 kilometres (30 mi) from Lucena and 178 kilometres (111 mi) from Manila.

=== Barangays ===
Agdangan is politically subdivided into 12 barangays, as indicated below. Each barangay consists of puroks and some have sitios.

- Binagbag
- Dayap
- Ibabang Kinagunan
- Ilayang Kinagunan
- Kanlurang Calutan
- Kanlurang Maligaya
- Salvacion
- Silangang Calutan
- Silangang Maligaya
- Sildora
- Poblacion I
- Poblacion II

=== Climate ===
Climate data for Agdangan, Quezon
Month	Jan	Feb	Mar	Apr	May	Jun	Jul	Aug	Sep	Oct	Nov	Dec	Year
Mean daily maximum °C (°F)	26 (79)	27 (81)	29 (84)	31 (88)	31 (88)	30 (86)	29 (84)	29 (84)	29 (84)	29 (84)	28 (82)	26 (79)	29 (84)
Mean daily minimum °C (°F)	22 (72)	22 (72)	22 (72)	23 (73)	24 (75)	24 (75)	24 (75)	24 (75)	24 (75)	24 (75)	23 (73)	23 (73)	23 (74)
Average precipitation mm (inches)	83 (3.3)	55 (2.2)	44 (1.7)	37 (1.5)	90 (3.5)	123 (4.8)	145 (5.7)	125 (4.9)	135 (5.3)	166 (6.5)	163 (6.4)	152 (6.0)	1,318 (51.8)
Average rainy days	15.1	10.8	11.9	11.4	19.9	23.7	26.3	23.9	23.9	22.1	20.2	18.6	227.8
Source: Meteoblue

== Demographics ==
Population census of Agdangan
Year	Pop.	±% p.a.
1948	3,898	—
1960	5,410	+2.77%
1970	7,235	+2.95%
1975	7,163	−0.20%
1980	7,389	+0.62%
1990	8,207	+1.06%
1995	9,025	+1.80%
2000	9,946	+2.10%
2007	11,164	+1.61%
2010	11,567	+1.30%
2015	12,851	+2.03%
2020	12,764	−0.14%
2024	13,316	+1.02%
Source: Philippine Statistics Authority

== Economy ==
Poverty incidence of Agdangan

Source: Philippine Statistics Authority

== Transportation ==
=== By land ===
The municipality is connected with Manila by the Pan-Philippine Highway and daily rail services to and from Naga & Legazpi are provided by the Philippine National Railways.

In order to spur development in the municipality, the Toll Regulatory Board declared Toll Road 5 the extension of South Luzon Expressway. A 420-kilometer, four lane expressway starting from the terminal point of the now under construction SLEX Toll Road 4 at Barangay Mayao, Lucena to Matnog, Sorsogon, near the Matnog Ferry Terminal. On August 25, 2020, San Miguel Corporation announced that they will invest the project which will reduce travel time from Lucena to Matnog from 9 hours to 5.5 hours.

On June 3, 2022, the Department of Transportation and San Miguel Corporation signed a Supplemental Toll Operations Agreement (STOA) for SLEX Toll Road 5 which was approved by then President Rodrigo Duterte on June 27. Segment 1 of TR5 will pass through the municipality.

== Government ==
=== Former chief executives ===
- Roque Marasigan Aguilar
- Catalino Zatarain Aguilar
- Crispin Salvador
- Pedro Salvador Francia
- Gregorio Valle
- Norberto Monterey
- Jose Isaac Lim
- Carmelito Cabana Legaspi
- Augusto Regencia Pobeda
- Rhadam P. Aguilar
- Vicenta Aguilar
- Rhadam P. Aguilar

== Education ==
The Padre Burgos-Agdangan Schools District Office governs all educational institutions within the municipality. It oversees the management and operations of all private and public, from primary to secondary schools.

=== Primary and elementary schools ===
- Agdangan Elementary School
- Agdangan Central Elementary School
- Binagbag Elementary School
- Dayap Elementary School
- E. Licup Elementary School
- Ilayang Kinagunan Elementary School
- Salvacion Elementary School

=== Secondary schools ===
- Binagbag National High School
- Elias A. Salvador National High School
