= Padre Burgos, Quezon =

Municipality in Quezon, Philippines

Padre Burgos Laguimanoc
- Municipality
- Municipality of Padre Burgos
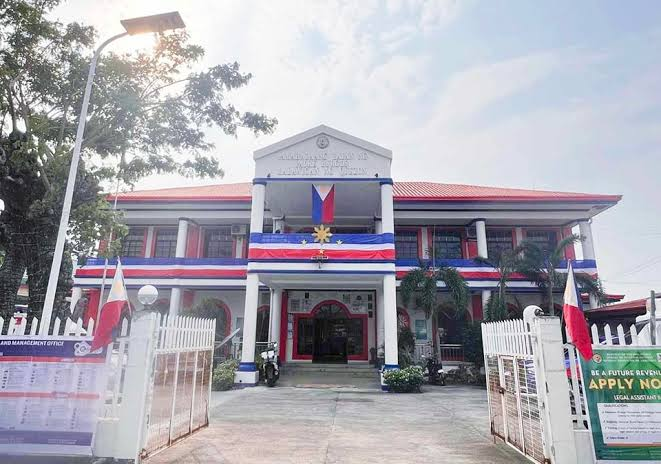

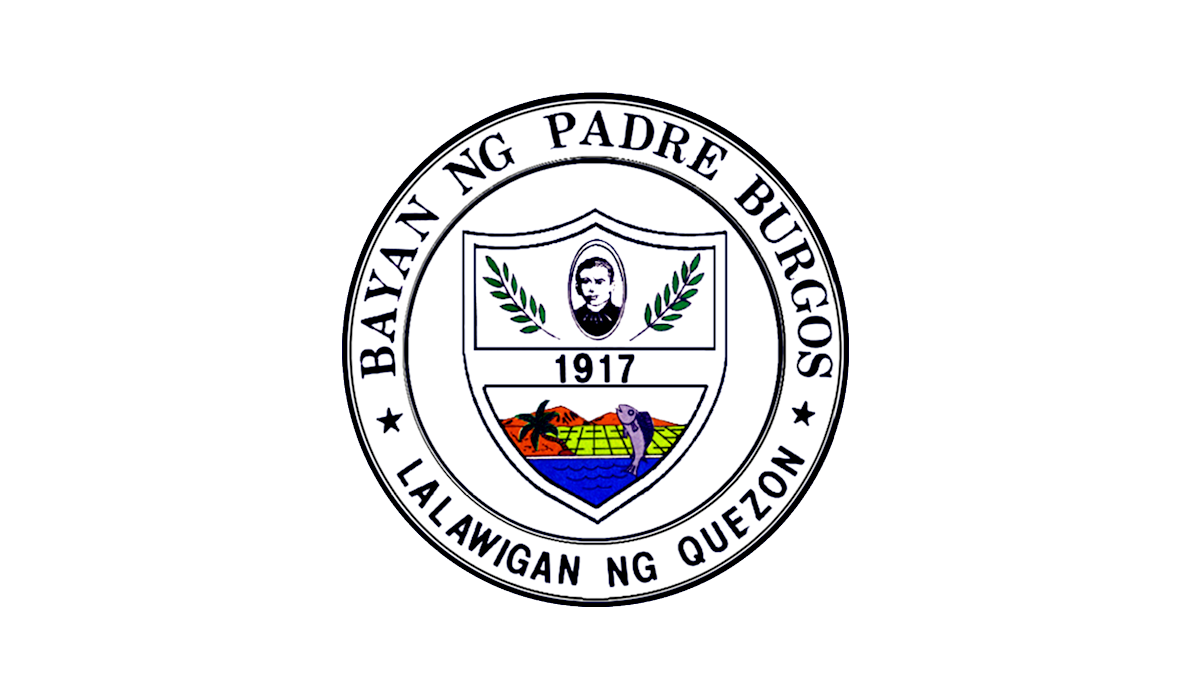
- Flag Seal

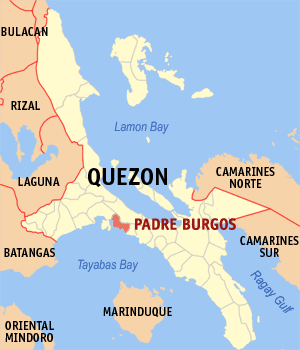
- Map of Quezon with Padre Burgos highlighted
- Interactive map of Padre Burgos
- Location within the Philippines
- Coordinates: 13°55′21″N 121°48′42″E
- Country: Philippines
- Region: Calabarzon
- Province: Quezon
- District: 3rd district
- Founded: January 1, 1917
- Renamed: December 3, 1927 (as Padre Burgos)
- Named for: José Burgos
- Barangays: 22 (see Barangays)

Government
  - Type: Sangguniang Bayan
  - Mayor: Ruben B. Uy Diokno
  - Vice Mayor: Francis Raymond O. Altez
  - Representative: Reynante U. Arrogancia
  - Municipal Council: Members: Pablito S. Flores; Cesar M. Parraba; John Ira Cark Q. Aranilla; Leandro P. Ilao; Christian R. Dumanggas; Ma. Rowena Geraldine A. Espina; Fulmark U. Vegerano; Hackett G. Pasia
  - Electorate: 16,771 voters (2025)

Area
  - Total: 69.10 km^{2} (26.68 sq mi)
- Elevation: 25 m (82 ft)
- Highest elevation: 280 m (920 ft)
- Lowest elevation: 0 m (0 ft)

Population (2024 census)
  - Total: 23,392
  - Density: 338.5/km^{2} (876.8/sq mi)
  - Households: 5,996
- Demonym: Padre Burgosin

Economy
  - Income class: 4th municipal income class
  - Poverty incidence: 7.55% (2023)
  - Revenue: ₱ 136.5 million (2024)
  - Assets: ₱ 469.8 million (2024)
  - Expenditure: ₱ 47.34 million (2024)
  - Liabilities: ₱ 97.13 million (2024)

Service provider
  - Electricity: Quezon 1 Electric Cooperative (QUEZELCO 1)
- Time zone: UTC+8 (PST)
- ZIP code: 4303
- PSGC: 0405629000
- IDD : area code: +63 (0)42
- Native languages: Tagalog
- Website: www.padburque.gov.ph

Padre Burgos, officially the Municipality of Padre Burgos (Tagalog: Bayan ng Padre Burgos), is a municipality in the province of Quezon, Philippines. According to the 2024 census, it has a population of 23,392 people.

The town is known for its unspoiled beaches and the Tulay Buhangin (Tagalog for "sand bridge").

== History ==
Padre Burgos was formerly known as Laguimanoc due to the shape of the coastline which resembles the bill of a chicken, which translates to “manok” in Tagalog. Another version is that chickens were so abundant in the town that hawks (Tagalog: “lawin”) swept down on the place to snatch chicks from their mothers. When hawks flew overhead, as warning to their neighborhood, people shouted “Hawk Manok” or “Lawin-Manok”.

On January 1, 1917, the village of Laguimanoc, which was formerly a barrio of Atimonan, became a municipality of what was then the province of Tayabas. On December 3, 1927, the town's name was changed to Padre Burgos by virtue of Act No. 3389, in honor of one of the country's martyrs, Fr. Jose Burgos. The streets were named after local leaders who rendered valuable services to the community. Because of the physical and topographic conditions of the town, four sitios where clusters of houses became the main district of the town, namely: Campo, Burgos, Basiao and Bundok-Punta.

The community converged to be in this particular spot because of its sea which made this town as port of Laguimanoc. In the early days this port offered a good wharf for vessels plying between Manila and southern Luzon. This was also a port of call for ships exporting lumber to Europe during the Spanish regime. In this town was the residence of the “Alcalde Mar” or Port Officer.

Business and other industries prospered, and people conglomerated in this spot. Spots of the historical interest are the wharf symbol of commercial progress, the old church with the old-fashioned “canyon” markers of the people's religious faith, the Bag Cement Slabs and Stone quarries mute testimonies of the effervescent power and grandeur of the early foreign settlers, the hills near the railroad station where the Japanese tortured and massacred civilians in the barrios of Marao and Polo where the Hunter's guerillas built their camps.

== Geography ==
Padre Burgos is located on the Bondoc Peninsula just east of Lucena, the provincial capital, and named after Filipino priest José Burgos. It is bounded on the north by Atimonan, on the west and north-west by Pagbilao, on the east by Agdangan, and on the south by the Tayabas Bay. It is 33 kilometers (21 mi) from Lucena and 163 kilometers (101 mi) from Manila.

=== Barangays ===
Padre Burgos is politically divided into 22 barangays, as indicated below. Each barangay consists of puroks and some have sitios.

- Basiao (Poblacion)
- Burgos (Poblacion)
- Cabuyao Norte
- Cabuyao Sur
- Campo (Poblacion)
- Danlagan
- Duhat
- Hinguiwin
- Kinagunan Ibaba
- Kinagunan Ilaya
- Lipata
- Marao
- Marquez
- Punta (Poblacion)
- Rizal
- San Isidro
- San Vicente
- Sipa
- Tulay Buhangin
- Villapaz
- Walay
- Yawe

=== Climate ===
Climate data for Padre Burgos, Quezon
Month	Jan	Feb	Mar	Apr	May	Jun	Jul	Aug	Sep	Oct	Nov	Dec	Year
Mean daily maximum °C (°F)	26 (79)	27 (81)	29 (84)	31 (88)	31 (88)	30 (86)	29 (84)	29 (84)	29 (84)	29 (84)	28 (82)	26 (79)	29 (84)
Mean daily minimum °C (°F)	22 (72)	22 (72)	22 (72)	23 (73)	24 (75)	24 (75)	24 (75)	24 (75)	24 (75)	24 (75)	23 (73)	23 (73)	23 (74)
Average precipitation mm (inches)	83 (3.3)	55 (2.2)	44 (1.7)	37 (1.5)	90 (3.5)	123 (4.8)	145 (5.7)	125 (4.9)	135 (5.3)	166 (6.5)	163 (6.4)	152 (6.0)	1,318 (51.8)
Average rainy days	15.1	10.8	11.9	11.4	19.9	23.7	26.3	23.9	23.9	22.1	20.2	18.6	227.8
Source: Meteoblue

== Demographics ==
Population census of Padre Burgos
Year	Pop.	±% p.a.
1918	2,216	—
1939	5,262	+4.20%
1948	10,029	+7.43%
1960	16,262	+4.11%
1970	12,765	−2.39%
1975	13,016	+0.39%
1980	14,078	+1.58%
1990	15,219	+0.78%
1995	17,635	+2.80%
2000	18,962	+1.57%
2007	19,877	+0.65%
2010	20,161	+0.52%
2015	22,460	+2.08%
2020	23,488	+0.95%
2024	23,392	−0.10%
Source: Philippine Statistics Authority

All the population are of Tagalog descent.

== Economy ==
Poverty incidence of Padre Burgos (%)

Source: Philippine Statistics Authority

The economy is primarily based on coconut husking and farming. Local tourism is also on the rise.

== Culture ==
=== In popular culture ===
This island was also set from the movie Alkitrang Dugo in 1975.

=== Laguimanoc festival ===
A festival celebrated every February 17 annually. This feast explains the history of the municipality. Laguimanoc was the former name of the municipality before it was renamed to Padre Burgos.

== Education ==
The Padre Burgos-Agdangan Schools District Office governs all educational institutions within the municipality. It oversees the management and operations of all private and public, from primary to secondary schools.

=== Primary and elementary schools ===
- Cabuyao Elementary School
- Child Jesus of Nazareth School
- Danlagan Elementary School
- Hinguiwin Elementary School
- Holy Cross Academy
- Kinagunan Elementary School
- Lipata Elementary School
- Padre Burgos Central School
- Pinaninding Elementary School
- Sipa Elementary School
- Villa Paz Elementary School
- Walay Elementary School
- Yawe Elementary School

=== Secondary schools ===
- Danlagan National High School
- Hinguiwin National High School
- Lina Gayeta-Lasquety National High School
- Polo Integrated School
- San Isidro National High School
