= Danilo Suarez =

Filipino politician

The Honorable Danilo Suarez
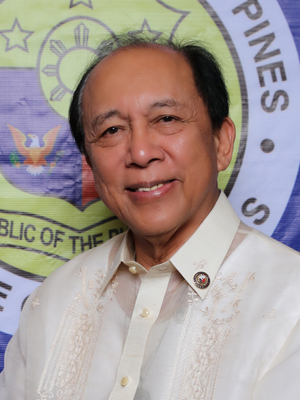
- Suarez in 2019

30th Governor of Quezon
- In office June 30, 2019 – June 30, 2022
- Vice Governor: Samuel Nantes
- Preceded by: David Suarez
- Succeeded by: Angelina Tan

House Minority Leader
- In office July 25, 2016 – June 30, 2019
- Preceded by: Ronaldo Zamora
- Succeeded by: Bienvenido Abante, Jr.
- In office January 20, 2012 – June 30, 2013
- Preceded by: Edcel Lagman
- Succeeded by: Ronaldo Zamora

Member of the Philippine House of Representatives from Quezon's 3rd congressional district
- In office June 30, 2016 – June 30, 2019
- Preceded by: Aleta Suarez
- Succeeded by: Aleta Suarez
- In office June 30, 2004 – June 30, 2013
- Preceded by: Aleta Suarez
- Succeeded by: Aleta Suarez
- In office June 30, 1992 – June 30, 2001
- Preceded by: Bienvenido Marquez, Jr.
- Succeeded by: Aleta Suarez

Personal details
- Born: Danilo Etorma Suarez; December 20, 1942 (age 83) Lucena, Tayabas, Commonwealth of the Philippines
- Party: Lakas (2007–2015; 2016–present)
- Other political affiliations: UNA (2015-2016); LAMMP (1998–2001); Liberal (1992-1998; 2001–2007)
- Spouse: Aleta Catarina Suarez (m. 1969)
- Children: 5 (including David)

Danilo "Danny" Etorma Suarez (born December 20, 1942) is a Filipino politician and former Governor of Quezon. He served as Minority Floor Leader of the House of Representatives of the Philippines representing the 3rd District of Quezon.

He maintains a regular column with the Manila Standard.

== Early life and career ==
Suarez attended West 1 and Quezon High in Lucena. As a working student, he tried everything from shining shoes, to selling newspapers, to being a hotel bellboy. Armed with nothing but his wits, he moved to Manila to find greener pastures. There, he met his wife Aleta. They had a difficult life, but perseverance rewarded them with better opportunities. The Suarez couple found their calling as entrepreneurs, and in 1992, started giving back to the people of Quezon through public service.

== As legislator ==
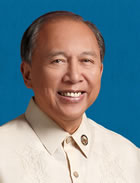
Suarez in the 17th Congress

Suarez first served as Quezon 3rd district representative in 1992 and served for three consecutive terms until 2001. Due to term limitation, his wife Aleta ran in 2001. He was appointed as vice chair of the National Road Board by then President Gloria Macapagal Arroyo. After his wife's term ended, he served for three consecutive terms from 2004 to 2013. On January 16, 2012, Suarez assumed post as Minority Floor Leader of the House of Representatives of the Philippines replacing Edcel Lagman who earlier resigned due to a term-sharing agreement.

He ran again unopposed during the 2016 election. He then ran for the Speakership in the 17th Congress of the Philippines but lost to Speaker Pantaleon Alvarez where he got 7 votes while Teddy Baguilat got 8 votes. Even though it is a tradition that the one who got the second highest votes is automatically the minority floor leader, a change in the house rules says that there should be an election within the minority bloc. He won as minority floor leader during the election on July 27, 2016, with 22 votes and 3 abstentions.

=== Environmental advocate ===
Suarez has been championing the protection of the environment throughout his political career. He opposed the Kaliwa Dam Project in Rizal province during the term of President Benigno Aquino III.

As House Representative, Suarez has been fighting for the growth and development of the local palm oil (copra) industry, urging the Department of Trade and Industry (DTI) and other concerned agencies to stop the importation of palm oil in support of the development of the country's coconut industry.

Suarez pushed for a congressional investigation on palm oil importation back in 2013 since it was dragging copra prices down.

=== Bills filed ===
Suarez introduced House Bill No. 599, an Act Mandating the Construction of the Quezon–Bicol Expressway to be called QuBEx, an expressway that shall link the provinces of Quezon with the Bicol regions starting from Malicboy in Pagbilao, Quezon and terminating in the province of Sorsogon in Bicol.

He also filed House Bill No. 6479, an act establishing Quezon Coconut Research and Development Center in Catanauan, Quezon.

He filed House Bill No. 7503, an act declaring Filipino sign language as the National sign language of the Filipino deaf. This was enacted into Republic Act No. 11106 in 2018.

== Governor of Quezon ==
Suarez was elected Governor of Quezon in 2019. He assumed office on June 30, 2019, succeeding his son David.

He ran for reelection in 2022, but lost to 4th district representative Angelina "Helen" Tan.

Political offices
Preceded by David C. Suarez	Governor of Quezon; 2019–2022	Succeeded by Angelina Tan
House of Representatives of the Philippines
Preceded by Aleta Suarez	Member of the House of Representatives from Quezon's 3rd district 2016–2019	Succeeded by Aleta Suarez
Preceded by Aleta Suarez	Member of the House of Representatives from Quezon's 3rd district 2004–2013	Succeeded by Aleta Suarez
Preceded by Bienvenido Marquez Jr.	Member of the House of Representatives from Quezon's 3rd district 1992–2001	Succeeded by Aleta Suarez
Preceded by Ronaldo Zamora	House Minority Leader; 2016–2019	Succeeded by Benny Abante
Preceded by Edcel Lagman	House Minority Leader; 2012–2013	Succeeded by Ronaldo Zamora
