= Rafael Nantes =

Governor of Quezon Province and politician (1957–2010)

Rafael P. Nantes
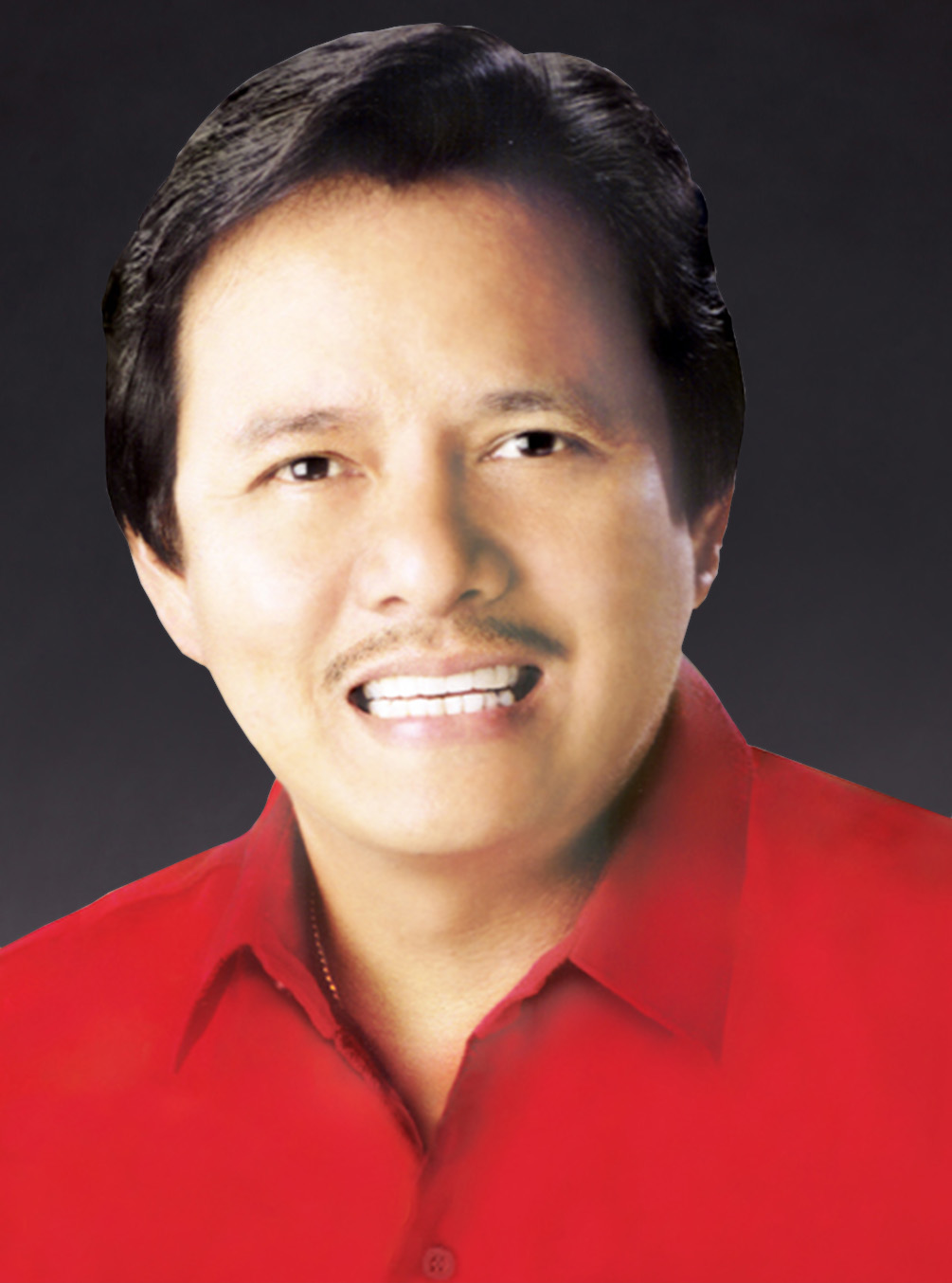

28th Governor of Quezon
- In office June 30, 2007 – May 17, 2010
- Vice Governor: Kelly Portes
- Preceded by: Wilfrido Enverga
- Succeeded by: Kelly Portes (Acting)

Member of the Philippine House of Representatives from Quezon's 1st district
- In office June 30, 1998 – June 30, 2007
- Preceded by: Wilfrido Enverga
- Succeeded by: Mark Enverga

Personal details
- Born: Rafael Puchero Nantes; January 4, 1957 Polillo, Quezon, Philippines
- Died: May 17, 2010 (aged 53) Lucena City, Philippines
- Party: Liberal (2001–2010)
- Other political affiliations: Reporma (1998–2001)
- Spouse: Betty Buenaobra
- Children: 1
- Education: National University (BS); Philippine Christian University (MBA)
- Profession: Mechanical engineer, businessman

Rafael Puchero "Raffy" Nantes (January 4, 1957 – May 17, 2010) was the governor of the Province of Quezon, Philippines from 2007 to 2010. He was the national treasurer of the Liberal Party. He first served as a congressman of the 1st District of Quezon from 1998 to 2007.

== Early life ==
He was born on January 4, 1957, in Polillo, Quezon to Dr. Alban Nantes and Eufemia Puchero. As a boy, he grew up with his grandmother Eleuteria, fondly called Nana Teryang, who was a fish dealer. Raffy helped in selling fish going from house to house.

When their family moved to Manila and transferred near Camp Aguinaldo, he became a shoeshine boy, shining shoes of generals and other officers in the Camp, to have needed funds for his studies and daily family expenses.

== Personal life ==
He was married to Betty Buenaobra, the President of People's International Enterprises Company and 2022 vice gubernatorial candidate. They had only one son named Samuel, who is an incumbent member of the Quezon Provincial Board since 2025 and previously served as the vice governor of Quezon from 2013 to 2022.

== Education ==
- Elementary – Camp Crame Elementary School (1970–1974)
- Secondary – Polillo National High School, Polillo, Quezon (1974–1978)
- College – National University: BS Mechanical Engineering (1979–1983)
- Post Graduate – Philippine Christian University: Master's degree in Business Administration (1983)

== Organization and position held ==
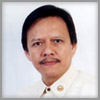
Official portrait during the 13th Congress

=== Socio-civic organizations ===
- National University Alumni Foundation Inc., President (2000–2005)
- Boy Scout of the Philippines (Quezon Chapter), Provincial chairman (2001–2007)
- Tipan, Governor and Presiding chairman (1999–2007)
- Club Filipino, Member (1999) and Board Director (2000)
- Quezonians 1923 Inc., President (1999)
- Rotary Club of Lucban, Member (1998–2004)
- Southern Tagalog Inventors Association, Member (1997–2002)
- Infanta (Quezon) Lions Club, President (1996–1998) and Adviser (1999–2004)
- Tau Gamma Phi fraternity, Secretary General & Convenor of Supreme Grand Council
- World Safety Organization, Member
- Safety Organization of the Philippines Business Establishment, Member

=== Positions ===
- Neutron Broadcasting Network, Inc. – President and chairman of the board (1997–1998)
- Banahaw Utilities Corporation – President and chairman of the board (1995–1998)
- Neutron Battery Company – President and general manager (1990–1998)
- People's International Enterprises Company – President and general manager (1984–1998)

== Awards received ==
- Kapalaran Award 2002 (Outstanding Congressman of the New Millennium, Best in Public Service and Landmark Legislation), Asia Pacific Youth Outreach Development, Inc. on July 27, 2002
- Handog kay Itay – 2002 Celebrity Father Awardee for Public Service, 22nd National Celebration of Father's Day, June 16, 2002
- Gawad Makamasa – Gawad Lingkod Uliran Award, May 25, 2002
- Hall of Fame Award – Top 20 Most Accomplished Personalities of the Philippines on May 12, 2002 (by ADE International Foundation)
- Leadership for Progress Awards 2002: Outstanding Congressman of the Year, Civic and Political Leader of the Philippines. Media Writer's Research for Community Development and Progress, Inc., March 16, 2002
- Most Consistent Outstanding Congressman for the Three Consecutive Years (From 1999 to 2001) on February 6, 2002 – by Congress Magazine, Makati Graduate School, Berhard Lending Investments and Reserved Soldiers Union Who's Who in the Philippines: 18th Annual People's Choice Awards, Huwarang Filipino Awardee for Government and Public Service On September 17, 2000
- Most Outstanding Legislator Award, Media Excellence Awards for Progress 2000 – Philippine Media Research and Progress Report Inc.,

September 9, 2000

- Most Outstanding Congressman – 11th Congress – by Phoenix Express Press Club, February 2, 2002
- Most Outstanding Neophyte Congressman of the 11th Congress on December 15, 1999 – by Congress Magazine, Makati Graduate School,

Berthard Lending Investments and Franco Cultural Properties Explosion System.

- Kapatiran Award 2002 (Outstanding Congressman of the New Millennium, Best in Public Service and Landmark Legislation), Asia Pacific Youth Outreach Development, Inc., on July 27, 2002
- The Golden Record of Excellence Award for Outstanding Inventor and Mechanical Engineer, Best in Entrepreneurship, given by the Sons and Daughters of Charity, Inc.
- 1997 Quezon Medalya ng Karangalan Awardee Lions Club International President's Award for Humanitarian Service

Outstanding Lions Club Leadership Awardee

- 1998 Infanta (Quezon) Lions Club Leadership Awardee Outstanding Triskelion Awardee – by Tau Gamma Phi Fraternity

International Region, U.S.A.

- Southern Tagalog Inventors Association Awardee
- Recipient of Appreciation from the National University Alumni Foundation Inc., for exemplary achievements in PUBLIC SERVICE and ENTREPRENEURSHIP, July 2000
- Kapatiran Award 2002 (Outstanding Congressman of the New Millennium, Best in Public Service and Landmark Legislation), Asia Pacific Youth Outreach Development, Inc. on July 27, 2002
- Best Utility Model Awardee – DOST Inventor's Week, November 2000
- Recipient of Congressional Commendation, Adopted by the House of Representatives (H. 163) on December 28, 2000, as Outstanding Filipino Inventor DOS Hall of Fame Awardee
- Parangal ng Bayan 2001 and Who's Who in the Philippines National Excellence Awardee for Government and Public Service.

== Death ==
Nantes died in a helicopter accident that crashed into two houses at Jael Subdivision 1, Barangay Iyam, Lucena on May 17, 2010, at about 3:15 p.m. He had just attended a regular weekly flag raising ceremony at the Quezon Convention Center in Lucena. Having been a Freemason, Nantes was refused a Catholic burial by Lucena Bishop Emilio Z. Marquez.

House of Representatives of the Philippines
Preceded by Wilfrido Enverga	Member of the House of Representatives from Quezon's 1st district 1998–2007	Succeeded by Mark Enverga
Political offices
Preceded by Wilfrido Enverga	Governor of Quezon; 2007–2010	Succeeded by Kelly Portes (acting)
