= Plaridel, Quezon =

Municipality in Quezon, Philippines

Plaridel Siain
- Municipality
- Municipality of Plaridel
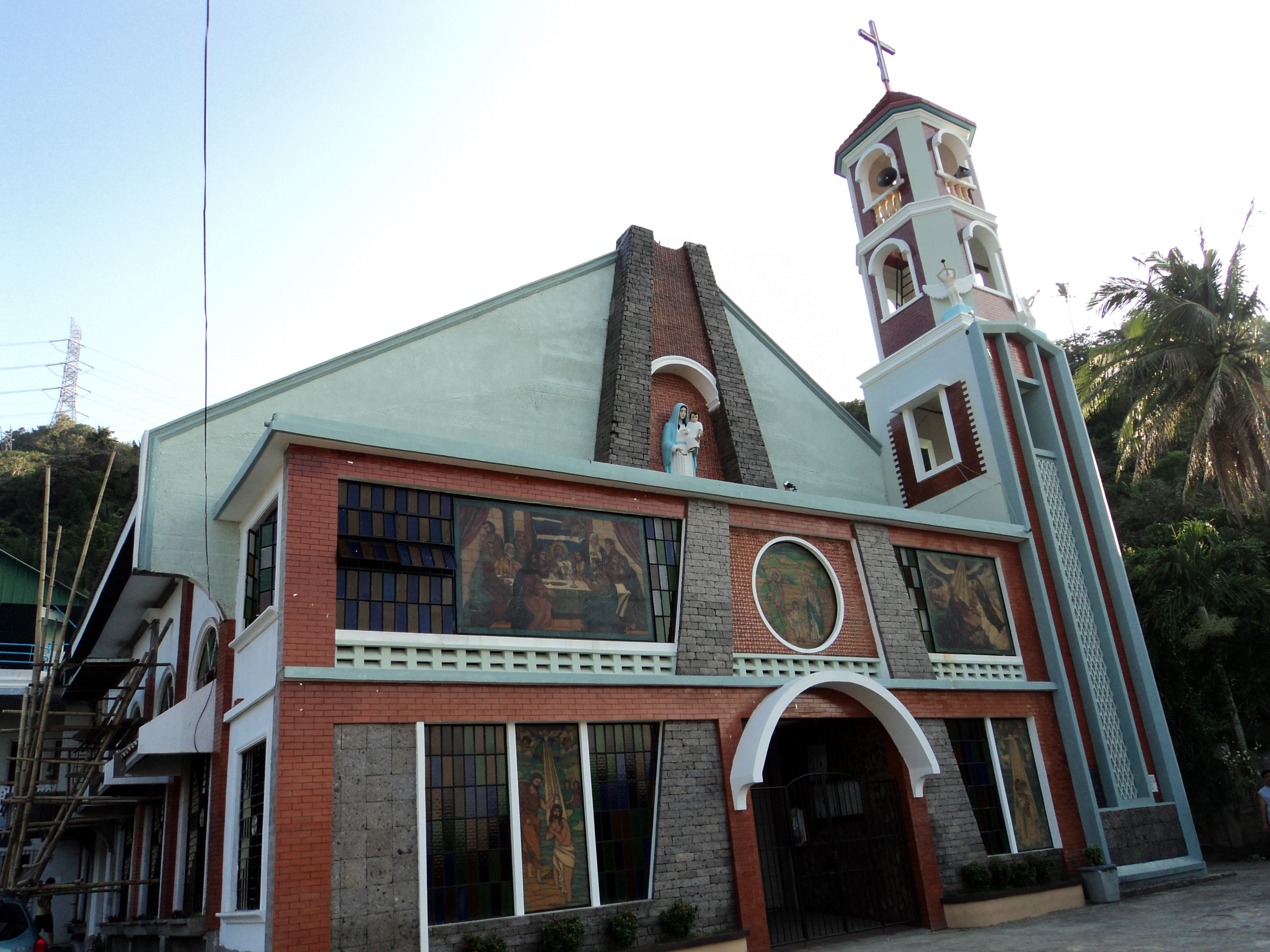
- Holy Rosary Parish

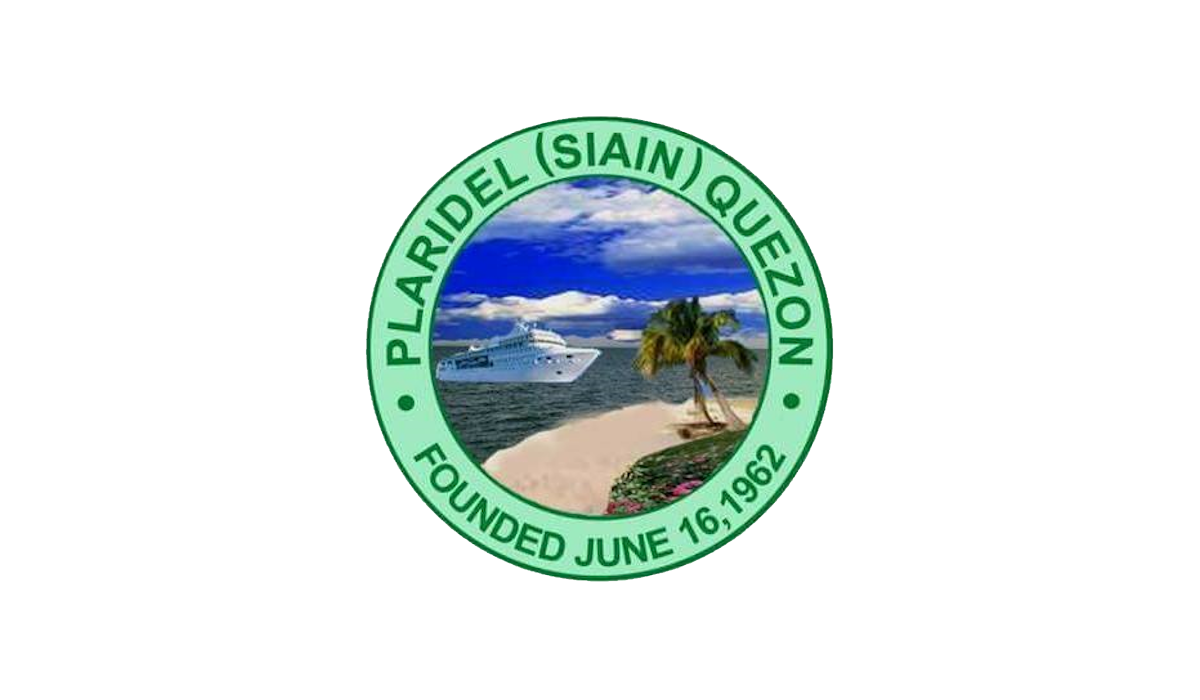
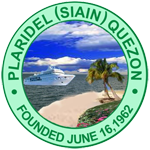
- Flag Seal

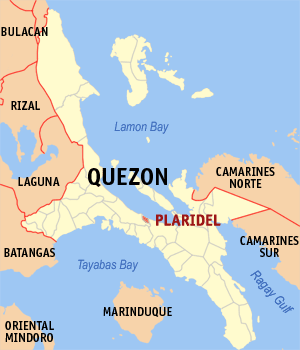
- Map of Quezon with Plaridel highlighted
- Interactive map of Plaridel
- Location within the Philippines
- Coordinates: 13°57′04″N 122°01′13″E
- Country: Philippines
- Region: Calabarzon
- Province: Quezon
- District: 4th district
- Founded: June 16, 1962
- Barangays: 9 (see Barangays)

Government
  - Type: Sangguniang Bayan
  - Mayor: Jose D. Saavedra
  - Vice Mayor: Bernardo V. Tumagay
  - Representative: Keith Micah DL. Tan
  - Municipal Council: Members: Sixto A. Alva; Rommel E. Caparros; Victor V. Tumagay; Denise Dianne A. Magbuhos; Don-Don M. Anda; Rodante C. Camba; Estelita M. Javier; Darwin B. Alvarez
  - Electorate: 8,656 voters (2025)

Area
  - Total: 35.05 km^{2} (13.53 sq mi)
- Elevation: 38 m (125 ft)
- Highest elevation: 248 m (814 ft)
- Lowest elevation: 0 m (0 ft)

Population (2024 census)
  - Total: 10,866
  - Density: 310.0/km^{2} (802.9/sq mi)
  - Households: 2,552
- Demonym(s): Siainin, Plaridelin

Economy
  - Income class: 5th municipal income class
  - Poverty incidence: 6.93% (2023)
  - Revenue: ₱ 86.54 million (2024)
  - Assets: ₱ 186.3 million (2024)
  - Expenditure: ₱ 25.8 million (2024)
  - Liabilities: ₱ 16.89 million (2024)

Service provider
  - Electricity: Quezon 1 Electric Cooperative (QUEZELCO 1)
- Time zone: UTC+8 (PST)
- ZIP code: 4306
- PSGC: 0405635000
- IDD : area code: +63 (0)42
- Native languages: Tagalog

Plaridel, officially the Municipality of Plaridel (Tagalog: Bayan ng Plaridel), is a municipality in the province of Quezon, Philippines. According to the 2024 census, it has a population of 10,866 people.

The municipality was created in 1962 by virtue of Republic Act No. 3493 where its territories carved out from Atimonan.

== History ==
Under the Republic Act No. 3493, barrios were taken from Atimonan, Quezon to constitute the Municipality of Plaridel. These barrios include Siain, Ilosong, Concepcion, Duhat, and Tanauan. As the Act decreed, Siain became the seat of government.

The Act was based on House Bill No. 822 introduced by Congressman Eladio A. Caliwara who was then representing the Second District of Quezon. It was signed in June 1962 by Philippine president Diosdado Macapagal enacting it as a law.

The Municipality of Plaridel was inaugurated on October 27, 1962.

== Geography ==
The smallest municipality in the province of Quezon, Plaridel has an area of 33 square kilometers comprising nine barangays - four of which are poblaciones - and its population is around 11,000. It lies between the towns of Atimonan and Gumaca, hugging the coastline of the Province alongside Maharlika Highway. Its inhabitants are occupied primarily with fishing. Those engaged in Agriculture plant mostly coconut and rice. A visitor this town must taste and savor its local version of Suman.

Plaridel is 55 kilometres (34 mi) from Lucena and 185 kilometres (115 mi) from Manila.

=== Barangays ===
Plaridel is politically subdivided into 9 barangays, as indicated below. Each barangay consists of puroks and some have sitios.

- Central (Poblacion)
- Concepcion
- Duhat
- Ilaya
- Ilosong
- M. L. Tumagay (Poblacion)
- Paang Bundok (Poblacion)
- Paaralan or Pampaaralan (Poblacion)
- Tanauan

Barangays Duhat, Ilaya, and Ilosong are south of the Poblacion, and are accessed by a paved road which connects with the National Maharlika Highway at Barangay Pampaaralan (also called Paaralan). This road is also the main access to Barangay Kulawit, part of the Municipality of Atimonan to the west.

=== Climate ===
Climate data for Plaridel, Quezon
Month	Jan	Feb	Mar	Apr	May	Jun	Jul	Aug	Sep	Oct	Nov	Dec	Year
Mean daily maximum °C (°F)	26 (79)	27 (81)	29 (84)	31 (88)	31 (88)	30 (86)	29 (84)	29 (84)	29 (84)	29 (84)	28 (82)	26 (79)	29 (84)
Mean daily minimum °C (°F)	22 (72)	22 (72)	22 (72)	23 (73)	24 (75)	24 (75)	24 (75)	24 (75)	24 (75)	24 (75)	23 (73)	23 (73)	23 (74)
Average precipitation mm (inches)	83 (3.3)	55 (2.2)	44 (1.7)	37 (1.5)	90 (3.5)	123 (4.8)	145 (5.7)	125 (4.9)	135 (5.3)	166 (6.5)	163 (6.4)	152 (6.0)	1,318 (51.8)
Average rainy days	15.1	10.8	11.9	11.4	19.9	23.7	26.3	23.9	23.9	22.1	20.2	18.6	227.8
Source: Meteoblue

== Demographics ==
Population census of Plaridel
Year	Pop.	±% p.a.
1970	5,665	—
1975	6,051	+1.33%
1980	6,386	+1.08%
1990	7,473	+1.58%
1995	8,666	+2.81%
2000	9,501	+1.99%
2007	10,069	+0.80%
2010	10,238	+0.61%
2015	10,935	+1.26%
2020	10,129	−1.60%
2024	10,866	+1.70%
Source: Philippine Statistics Authority

=== Religion ===
- Roman Catholic
- Iglesia Ni Cristo
- Seventh Day Adventist
- Bible Baptist

== Economy ==
Poverty incidence of Plaridel (%)

Source: Philippine Statistics Authority

== Government ==
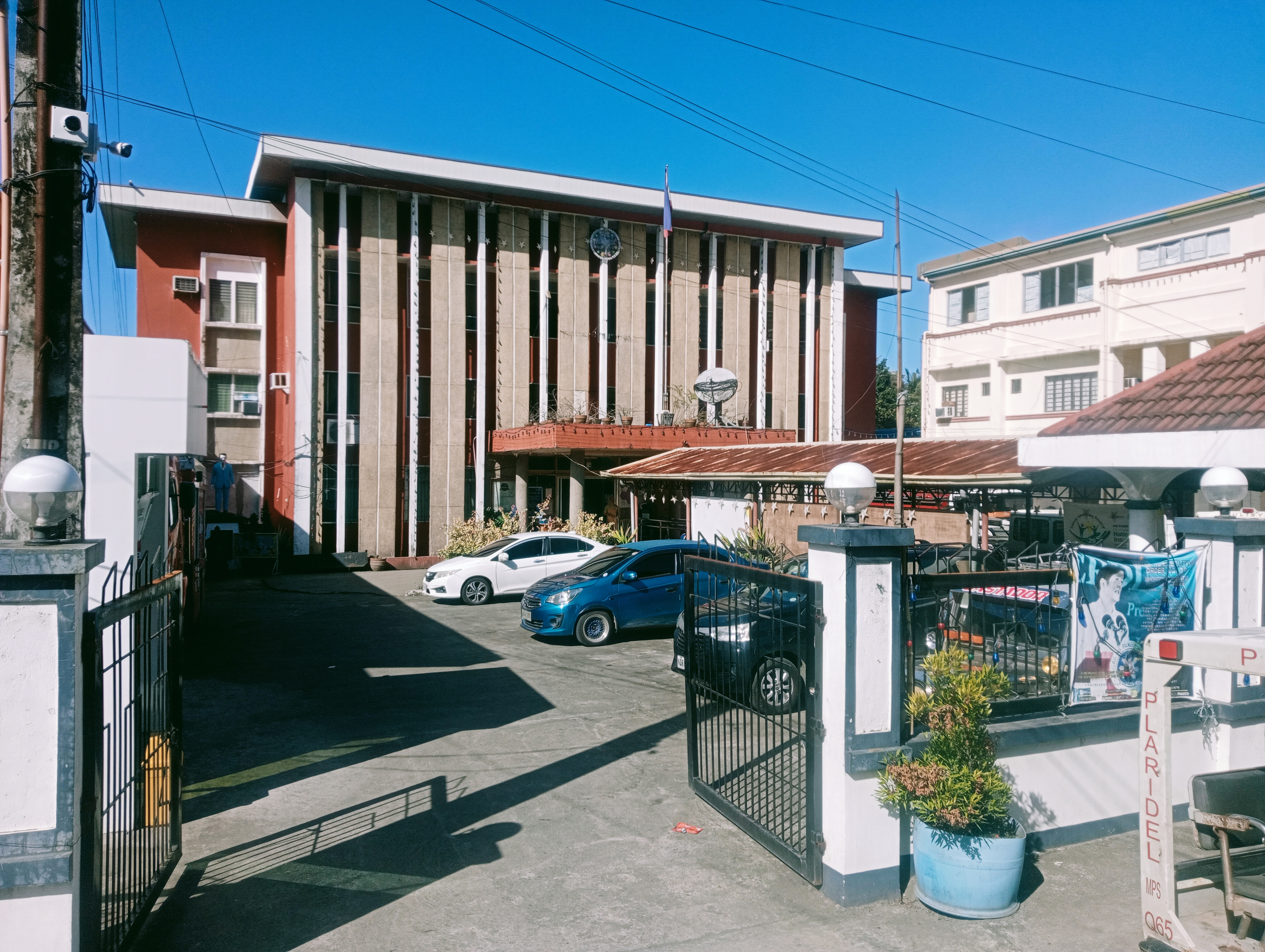
Municipal Hall

=== Elected officials ===
Municipal council (2022-2025):

- Mayor: Jose D. Saavedra
- Vice Mayor: Bernardo V. Tumagay
- Councilors:
  - Sixto Alva
  - Rommel Caparros
  - Victor Tumagay
  - Atorni Dee Magbuhos
  - Don-Don Anda
  - Omack Camba
  - Estelita Javier
  - Darwin Alvarez

== Education ==
The Plaridel Schools District Office governs all educational institutions within the municipality. It oversees the management and operations of all private and public, from primary to secondary schools.

=== Primary and elementary schools ===
- Concepcion Elementary School
- Ilosong Elementary School
- Plaridel Central School
- Tanauan Elementary School

=== Secondary schools ===
- Concepcion National High School
- Plaridel Memorial School
