= Quezon's 2nd congressional district =

Legislative district of the Philippines

- Constituency for the House of Representatives of the Philippines
- Boundary of Quezon's 2nd congressional district in Quezon
- Location of Quezon within the Philippines
- Province: Quezon
- Region: Calabarzon
- Population: 753,343 (2020)
- Electorate: 471,129 (2022)
- Major settlements: 6 LGUs: Cities; Lucena; Municipalities; Candelaria; Dolores; San Antonio; Sariaya; Tiaong
- Area: 825.38 km^{2} (318.68 sq mi)

Current constituency
- Created: 1907
- Representative: David C. Suarez
- Political party: Lakas–CMD
- Congressional bloc: Majority

Quezon's 2nd congressional district is one of the four congressional districts of the Philippines in the province of Quezon, formerly Tayabas. It has been represented in the House of Representatives of the Philippines since 1916 and earlier in the Philippine Assembly from 1907 to 1916. The district consists of Quezon's capital city of Lucena and adjacent municipalities of Candelaria, Dolores, San Antonio, Sariaya and Tiaong. It is currently represented in the 20th Congress by David C. Suarez of Lakas–CMD.

Prior to its second dissolution in 1972, the second district encompassed the eastern Quezon municipalities of Agdangan, Alabat, Atimonan, Buenavista, Calauag, Catanauan, General Luna, Guinayangan, Gumaca, Lopez, Macalelon, Mulanay, Padre Burgos, Pitogo, Plaridel, Quezon, San Andres, San Francisco, San Narciso, Tagkawayan, and Unisan. In 1922, Atimonan and Padre Burgos, then known as Laguimanoc, became part of this district after being initially part of the first district. Marinduque, a former sub-province of Tayabas (now Quezon), was also part of this district until it was granted its own representation beginning in 1922, two years after its re-establishment as an independent province. Following the restoration of the Congress in 1987, the aforementioned municipalities were realigned into the new third and fourth districts, respectively, and this district was redefined to encompass the western part of Quezon, a configuration that remains up to date.

== Representation history ==
| # | Image | Member | Term of office | | Legislature | Party | Electoral history | Constituent LGUs |
| # | Image | Member | Start | End | Legislature | Party | Electoral history | Constituent LGUs |
|---|---|---|---|---|---|---|---|---|
=== Tayabas's 2nd district for the Philippine Assembly ===
District created January 9, 1907.
| 1 | | Emiliano A. Gala | October 16, 1907 | October 16, 1909 | 1st | Independent | Elected in 1907. | 1907–1909; Alabat, Boac, Calauag, Catanauan, Gasan, Guinayangan, Gumaca, Lopez, Mulanay, Pitogo, Santa Cruz, Torrijos |
| 2 | | Gregorio Nieva | October 16, 1909 | October 16, 1912 | 2nd | Nacionalista | Elected in 1909. | 1909–1912; Alabat, Boac, Calauag, Catanauan, Gasan, Guinayangan, Gumaca, Lopez, Macalelon, Mulanay, Pitogo, Santa Cruz, Torrijos, Unisan |
| 3 | | Bernardo del Mundo | October 16, 1912 | October 16, 1916 | 3rd | Independent | Elected in 1912. | 1912–1916; Alabat, Boac, Calauag, Catanauan, Gasan, Guinayangan, Gumaca, Lopez, Macalelon, Mogpog, Mulanay, Pitogo, Santa Cruz, Torrijos, Unisan |
=== Tayabas's 2nd district for the House of Representatives of the Philippine Islands ===
| (2) | | Gregorio Nieva | October 16, 1916 | June 3, 1919 | 4th | Nacionalista | Elected in 1916. | 1916–1922; Alabat, Boac, Calauag, Catanauan, Gasan, Guinayangan, Gumaca, Lopez, Macalelon, Mogpog, Mulanay, Pitogo, Quezon, San Narciso, Santa Cruz, Torrijos, Unisan |
| 4 | | Ricardo Paras | June 3, 1919 | June 6, 1922 | 5th | Nacionalista | Elected in 1919. | 1916–1922; Alabat, Boac, Calauag, Catanauan, Gasan, Guinayangan, Gumaca, Lopez, Macalelon, Mogpog, Mulanay, Pitogo, Quezon, San Narciso, Santa Cruz, Torrijos, Unisan |
| 5 | | Rafael R. Vilar | June 6, 1922 | June 2, 1925 | 6th | Nacionalista; Colectivista | Elected in 1922. | 1922–1928; Alabat, Atimonan, Calauag, Catanauan, Guinayangan, Gumaca, Laguimanoc, Lopez, Macalelon, Mulanay, Pitogo, Quezon, San Narciso, Unisan |
| 6 | | León Guinto | June 2, 1925 | September 20, 1928 | 7th | Nacionalista; Consolidado | Elected in 1925. | 1922–1928; Alabat, Atimonan, Calauag, Catanauan, Guinayangan, Gumaca, Laguimanoc, Lopez, Macalelon, Mulanay, Pitogo, Quezon, San Narciso, Unisan |
| 6 | | León Guinto | June 2, 1925 | September 20, 1928 | 8th | Nacionalista; Consolidado | Re-elected in 1928. Resigned on appointment as Tayabas governor. | 1928–1931; Alabat, Atimonan, Calauag, Catanauan, Guinayangan, Gumaca, Lopez, Macalelon, Mulanay, Padre Burgos, Pitogo, Quezon, San Narciso, Unisan |
| 7 | | Marcelo T. Boncan | October 6, 1928 | June 5, 1934 | 8th | Nacionalista; Consolidado | Elected in 1928 to finish Guinto's term. | 1928–1931; Alabat, Atimonan, Calauag, Catanauan, Guinayangan, Gumaca, Lopez, Macalelon, Mulanay, Padre Burgos, Pitogo, Quezon, San Narciso, Unisan |
| 7 | | Marcelo T. Boncan | October 6, 1928 | June 5, 1934 | 9th | Nacionalista; Consolidado | Re-elected in 1931. | 1931–1935; Alabat, Atimonan, Calauag, Catanauan, General Luna, Guinayangan, Gumaca, Lopez, Macalelon, Mulanay, Padre Burgos, Pitogo, Quezon, San Narciso, Unisan |
| 8 | | Antonio Z. Argosino | June 5, 1934 | September 16, 1935 | 10th | Sakdalista | Elected in 1934. | 1931–1935; Alabat, Atimonan, Calauag, Catanauan, General Luna, Guinayangan, Gumaca, Lopez, Macalelon, Mulanay, Padre Burgos, Pitogo, Quezon, San Narciso, Unisan |
| # | Image | Member | Term of office | | National Assembly | Party | Electoral history | Constituent LGUs |
| # | Image | Member | Start | End | National Assembly | Party | Electoral history | Constituent LGUs |
=== Tayabas's 2nd district for the National Assembly (Commonwealth of the Philippines) ===
| 9 | | Francisco Lavides | September 16, 1935 | December 30, 1941 | 1st | Nacionalista; Democrático | Elected in 1935. | 1935–1938; Alabat, Atimonan, Calauag, Catanauan, General Luna, Guinayangan, Gumaca, Lopez, Macalelon, Mulanay, Padre Burgos, Pitogo, Quezon, San Narciso, Unisan |
| 9 | | Francisco Lavides | September 16, 1935 | December 30, 1941 | 2nd | Nacionalista | Re-elected in 1938. | 1938–1941; Alabat, Atimonan, Bondo, Calauag, Catanauan, General Luna, Guinayangan, Gumaca, Lopez, Macalelon, Mulanay, Padre Burgos, Pitogo, Quezon, San Narciso, Unisan |
District dissolved into the two-seat Tayabas's at-large district for the National Assembly (Second Philippine Republic).
| # | Image | Member | Term of office | | Common wealth Congress | Party | Electoral history | Constituent LGUs |
| # | Image | Member | Start | End | Common wealth Congress | Party | Electoral history | Constituent LGUs |
=== Tayabas's 2nd district for the House of Representatives of the Commonwealth of the Philippines ===
District re-created May 24, 1945.
| (9) | | Francisco Lavides | June 11, 1945 | May 25, 1946 | 1st | Nacionalista | Re-elected in 1941. | 1945–1946; Agdangan, Alabat, Atimonan, Aurora, Calauag, Catanauan, General Luna, Guinayangan, Gumaca, Lopez, Macalelon, Mulanay, Padre Burgos, Pitogo, Quezon, San Narciso, Tagkawayan, Unisan |
| # | Image | Member | Term of office | | Congress | Party | Electoral history | Constituent LGUs |
| # | Image | Member | Start | End | Congress | Party | Electoral history | Constituent LGUs |
=== Tayabas's 2nd district for the House of Representatives of the Philippines ===
| 10 | | Tomás Morató | May 25, 1946 | December 30, 1949 | 1st | Liberal | Elected in 1946. | 1946–1949; Agdangan, Alabat, Atimonan, Aurora, Calauag, Catanauan, General Luna, Guinayangan, Gumaca, Lopez, Macalelon, Mulanay, Padre Burgos, Pitogo, Quezon, San Narciso, Tagkawayan, Unisan |
=== Quezon's 2nd district for the House of Representatives of the Philippines ===
| 11 | | Gaudencio V. Vera | December 30, 1949 | December 30, 1953 | 2nd | Liberal | Elected in 1949. | 1949–1953; Agdangan, Alabat, Atimonan, Aurora, Calauag, Catanauan, General Luna, Guinayangan, Gumaca, Lopez, Macalelon, Mulanay, Padre Burgos, Pitogo, Quezon, San Narciso, Tagkawayan, Unisan |
| 12 | | León M. Guinto Jr. | December 30, 1953 | December 30, 1961 | 3rd | Nacionalista | Elected in 1953. | 1953–1961; Agdangan, Alabat, Atimonan, Aurora, Buenavista, Calauag, Catanauan, General Luna, Guinayangan, Gumaca, Lopez, Macalelon, Mulanay, Padre Burgos, Pitogo, Quezon, San Narciso, Tagkawayan, Unisan |
| 12 | | León M. Guinto Jr. | December 30, 1953 | December 30, 1961 | 4th | Nacionalista | Re-elected in 1957. | 1953–1961; Agdangan, Alabat, Atimonan, Aurora, Buenavista, Calauag, Catanauan, General Luna, Guinayangan, Gumaca, Lopez, Macalelon, Mulanay, Padre Burgos, Pitogo, Quezon, San Narciso, Tagkawayan, Unisan |
| 13 | | Eladio A. Caliwara | December 30, 1961 | December 30, 1969 | 5th | Liberal | Elected in 1961. | 1961–1965; Agdangan, Alabat, Atimonan, Aurora, Buenavista, Calauag, Catanauan, General Luna, Guinayangan, Gumaca, Lopez, Macalelon, Mulanay, Padre Burgos, Pitogo, Quezon, San Andres, San Narciso, Tagkawayan, Unisan |
| 13 | | Eladio A. Caliwara | December 30, 1961 | December 30, 1969 | 6th | Liberal | Re-elected in 1965. | 1965–1969; Agdangan, Alabat, Atimonan, Aurora, Buenavista, Calauag, Catanauan, General Luna, Guinayangan, Gumaca, Lopez, Macalelon, Mulanay, Padre Burgos, Pitogo, Plaridel, Quezon, San Andres, San Narciso, Tagkawayan, Unisan |
| 14 | | Godofredo M. Tan | December 30, 1969 | September 23, 1972 | 7th | Nacionalista | Elected in 1969. Removed from office after imposition of martial law. | 1969–1972; Agdangan, Alabat, Atimonan, Buenavista, Calauag, Catanauan, General Luna, Guinayangan, Gumaca, Lopez, Macalelon, Mulanay, Padre Burgos, Pitogo, Plaridel, Quezon, San Andres, San Francisco, San Narciso, Tagkawayan, Unisan |
District dissolved into the twenty-seat Region IV-A's at-large district for the Interim Batasang Pambansa, followed by the four-seat Quezon's at-large district for the Regular Batasang Pambansa.
District re-created February 2, 1987.
| 15 | | Mario L. Tagarao | June 30, 1987 | April 23, 1990 | 8th | Liberal | Elected in 1987. Died. | 1987–present Candelaria, Dolores, Lucena, San Antonio, Sariaya, Tiaong |
| 16 | | Marcial C. Punzalan Jr. | June 30, 1992 | May 12, 2001 | 9th | LDP | Elected in 1992. | 1987–present Candelaria, Dolores, Lucena, San Antonio, Sariaya, Tiaong |
| 16 | | Marcial C. Punzalan Jr. | June 30, 1992 | May 12, 2001 | 10th | Lakas | Re-elected in 1995. | 1987–present Candelaria, Dolores, Lucena, San Antonio, Sariaya, Tiaong |
| 16 | | Marcial C. Punzalan Jr. | June 30, 1992 | May 12, 2001 | 11th | Lakas | Re-elected in 1998. Died. | 1987–present Candelaria, Dolores, Lucena, San Antonio, Sariaya, Tiaong |
| 17 | | Lynette A. Punzalan | June 30, 2001 | June 30, 2004 | 12th | Lakas | Elected in 2001. | 1987–present Candelaria, Dolores, Lucena, San Antonio, Sariaya, Tiaong |
| 18 | | Proceso Alcala | June 30, 2004 | June 30, 2010 | 13th | Liberal | Elected in 2004. | 1987–present Candelaria, Dolores, Lucena, San Antonio, Sariaya, Tiaong |
| 18 | | Proceso Alcala | June 30, 2004 | June 30, 2010 | 14th | Liberal | Re-elected in 2007. | 1987–present Candelaria, Dolores, Lucena, San Antonio, Sariaya, Tiaong |
| 19 | | Irvin M. Alcala | June 30, 2010 | June 30, 2013 | 15th | Liberal | Elected in 2010. | 1987–present Candelaria, Dolores, Lucena, San Antonio, Sariaya, Tiaong |
| 20 | | Vicente J. Alcala | June 30, 2013 | June 30, 2019 | 16th | Liberal | Elected in 2013. | 1987–present Candelaria, Dolores, Lucena, San Antonio, Sariaya, Tiaong |
| 20 | | Vicente J. Alcala | June 30, 2013 | June 30, 2019 | 17th | PDP–Laban | Re-elected in 2016. | 1987–present Candelaria, Dolores, Lucena, San Antonio, Sariaya, Tiaong |
| 21 | | David C. Suarez | June 30, 2019 | Incumbent | 18th | Nacionalista | Elected in 2019. | 1987–present Candelaria, Dolores, Lucena, San Antonio, Sariaya, Tiaong |
| 21 | | David C. Suarez | June 30, 2019 | Incumbent | 19th | Lakas | Re-elected in 2022. | 1987–present Candelaria, Dolores, Lucena, San Antonio, Sariaya, Tiaong |
| 21 | | David C. Suarez | June 30, 2019 | Incumbent | 20th | Lakas | Re-elected in 2025. | 1987–present Candelaria, Dolores, Lucena, San Antonio, Sariaya, Tiaong |

== Election results ==
=== 2025 ===
2025 Philippine House of Representatives elections
| Party | Candidate | Votes | % |
|---|---|---|---|
| Lakas | David Suarez | 286,091 | 100.00 |
| Total votes | | 286,091 | 100.00 |
| Lakas hold | | | |

=== 2022 ===
2022 Philippine House of Representatives elections
| Party | Candidate | Votes | % |
|---|---|---|---|
| Nacionalista | David Suarez | 207,836 | 52.93 |
| NPC | Proceso Alcala | 173,639 | 44.22 |
| Reporma | Antonio Punzalan | 6,038 | 1.54 |
| Independent | Abigail Jashael Bagabaldo | 3,129 | 0.80 |
| Independent | Alejandro Nebu | 2,026 | 0.52 |
| Total votes | | 392,668 | 100.00 |
| Nacionalista hold | | | |

=== 2019 ===
2019 Philippine House of Representatives elections
| Party | Candidate | Votes | % |
|---|---|---|---|
| Nacionalista | David Suarez | 171,903 | |
| Liberal | Proceso Alcala | 120,998 | |
| Aksyon | Amadeo Suarez | 2,699 | |
| PFP | Boyet Masilang | 3,957 | |
| DPP | Christian Señeres | 1,076 | |
| Margin of victory | | | |
| Rejected ballots | | | |
| Turnout | | | |
| Nacionalista gain from PDP–Laban | | | |

=== 2016 ===
2016 Philippine House of Representatives elections
| Party | Candidate | Votes | % |
|---|---|---|---|
| Liberal | Vicente Alcala | 174,578 | 64.40 |
| Independent | Rosauro Masilang | 85,945 | 31.70 |
| Independent | Vivencio Escueta | 16,245 | 3.90 |
| Margin of victory | | | |
| Rejected ballots | | | |
| Turnout | | | |
| Liberal hold | | | |

=== 2013 ===
2013 Philippine House of Representatives elections
| Party | Candidate | Votes | % |
|---|---|---|---|
| Liberal | Vicente Alcala | 94,113 | 50.55 |
| UNA | Barbara Ruby Talaga | 42,791 | 22.98 |
| Independent | Lynette Punzalan | 16,245 | 8.73 |
| Lakas | Kneigoutina Suarez | 9,124 | 4.90 |
| Independent | Marivic Rivera | 475 | 0.26 |
| Margin of victory | | 51,322 | 27.56% |
| Rejected ballots | | 23,438 | 12.59% |
| Turnout | | 186,186 | 100 |
| Liberal hold | | | |

=== 2010 ===
2010 Philippine House of Representatives elections
| Party | Candidate | Votes | % |
|---|---|---|---|
| Liberal | Irvin Alcala | 170,760 | 74.41 |
| Nacionalista | James Rey Bico | 40,260 | 17.57 |
| PMP | Bernard Tagarao | 18,169 | 7.95 |
| Valid ballots | | 229,189 | 90.78 |
| Invalid or blank votes | | 23,281 | 9.22 |
| Total votes | | 252,470 | 100.00 |
| Liberal hold | | | |

== See also ==
- Legislative districts of Quezon
