= Tayabas Bay =

Large bay in southern Luzon

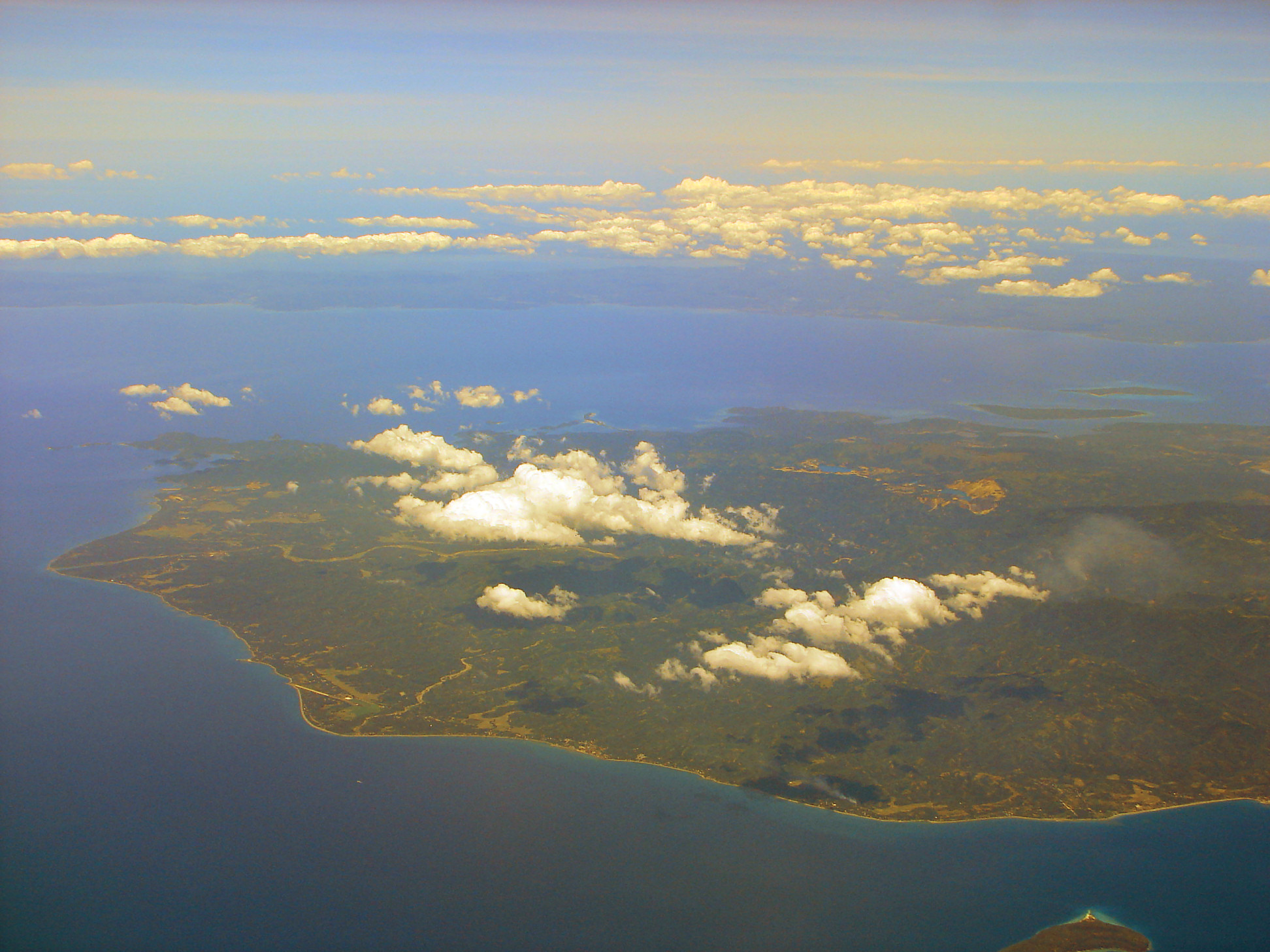
- The island of Marinduque within the bay with the coast of Quezon in the background

- Location in Luzon Location in the Philippines
- Location: Luzon Island, Philippines
- Coordinates: 13°37′37″N 121°46′30″E
- Type: bay
- Islands: Marinduque
- Settlements: Agdangan; Boac; Buenavista; Catanauan; Gasan; General Luna; Lobo; Lucena; Macalelon; Mogpog; Mulanay; Padre Burgos; Pagbilao; Pitogo; San Francisco; San Juan; Santa Cruz; Sariaya; Torrijos; Unisan

Tayabas Bay is a large bay in the southern part of Luzon island in the Philippines. Several islands are located in the bay, largest of which is Marinduque. It has a total surface area of 2,500 km^{2} (970 sq mi).

The bay is bordered on the north and east side by Quezon (formerly known as Tayabas) province and San Juan, Batangas. Lucena, the capital city of Quezon Province, is located along Tayabas Bay, where several boat and ferry lines serve the sea lanes between Lucena and the different points in the region.

Several fauna are found in Tayabas Bay. Among them are whale sharks (Rhincodon typus) Sea turtles such as Lepidochelys olivacea, Eretmochelys imbricata, and Chelonia mydas also lay eggs in the bay. However, these turtle hatchlings are threatened by baklad or fish traps within the bay.
