= Unisan, Quezon =

Municipality in Quezon, Philippines

Unisan Kalilayan
- Municipality
- Municipality of Unisan
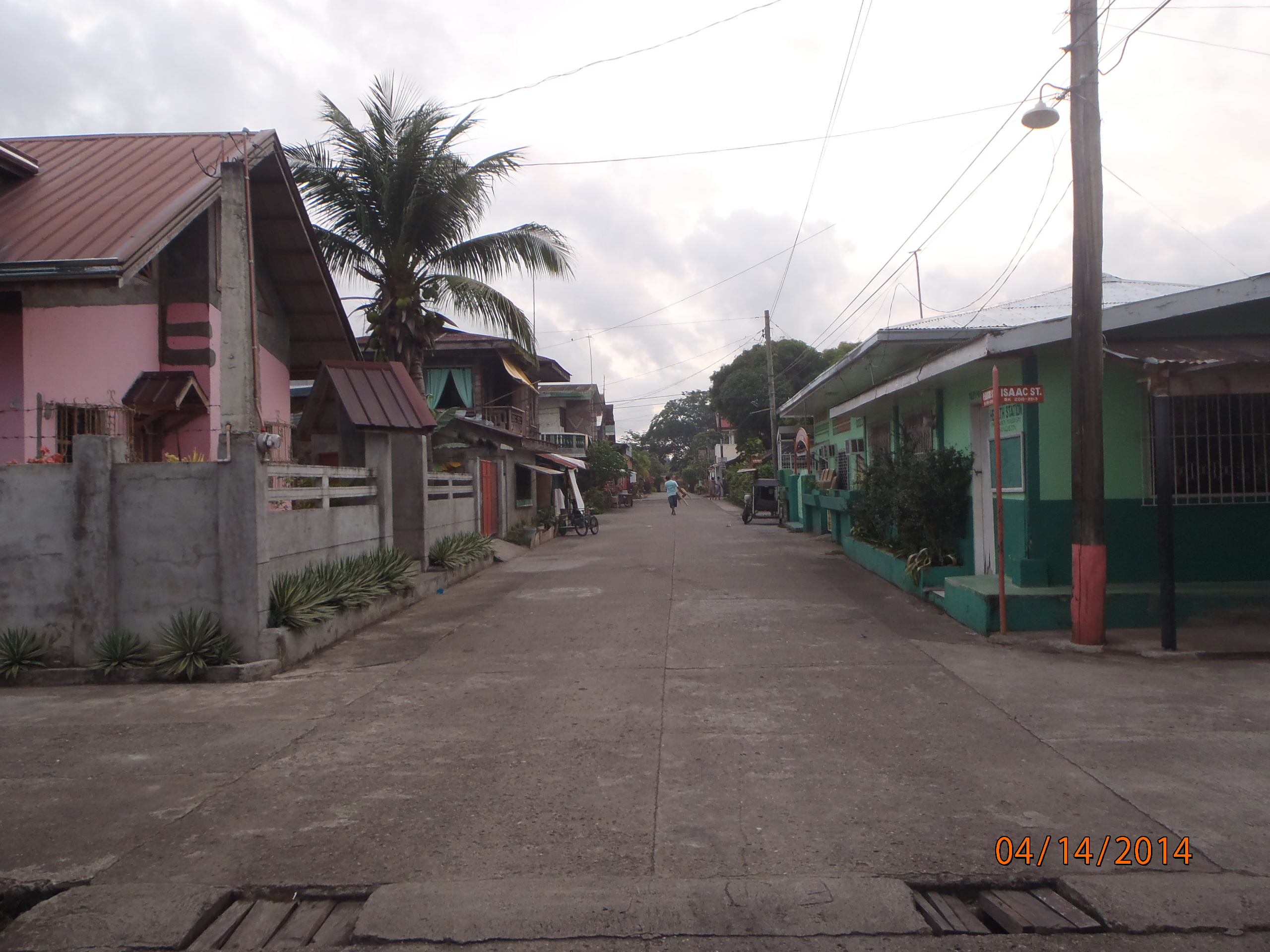
- Barangay R. Magsaysay

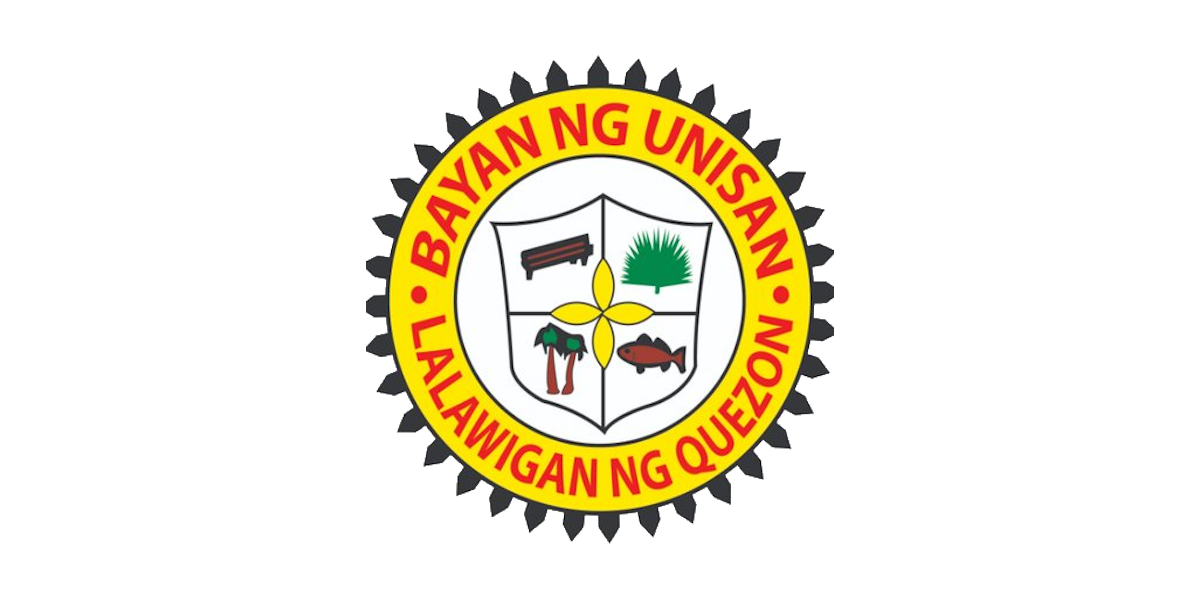
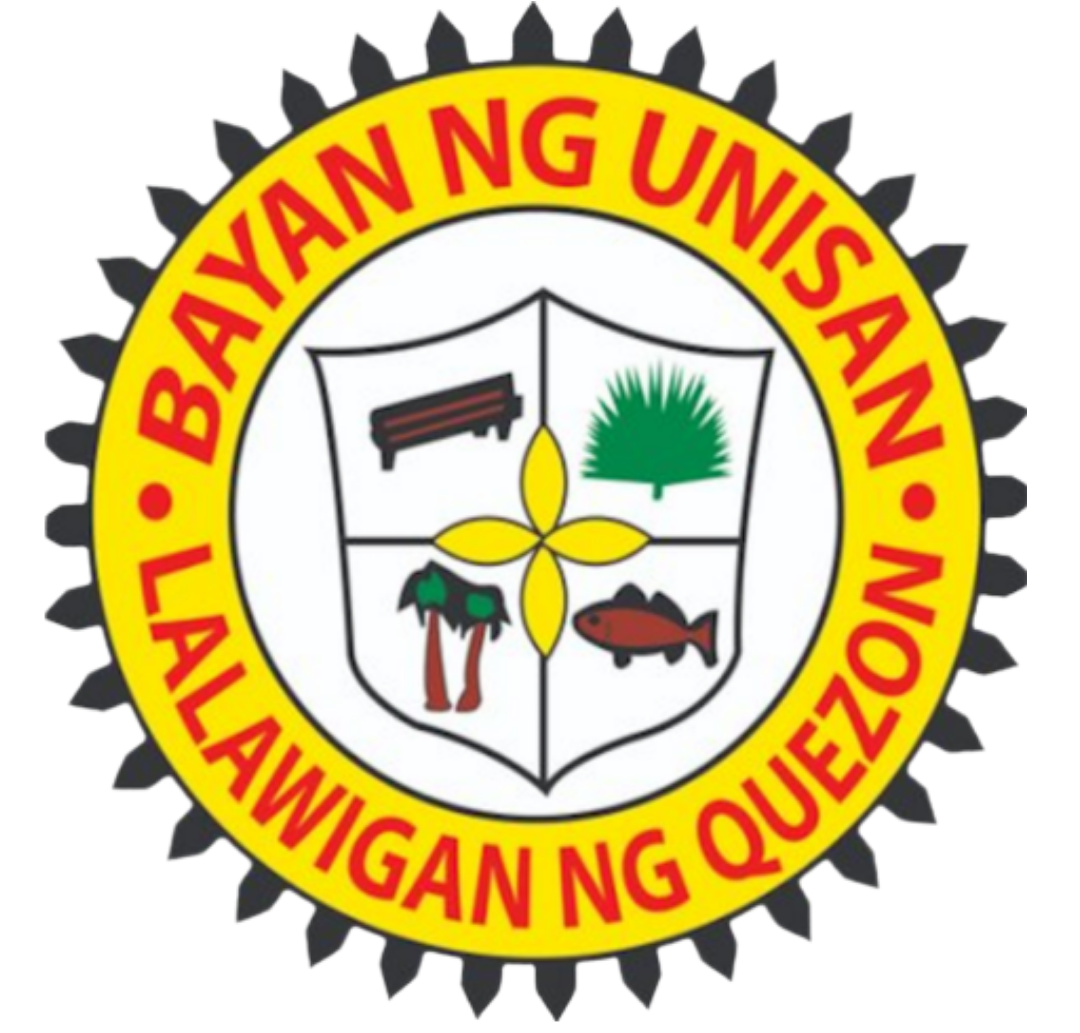
- Flag Seal
- Nickname: Old Capital of Kalilayan Province
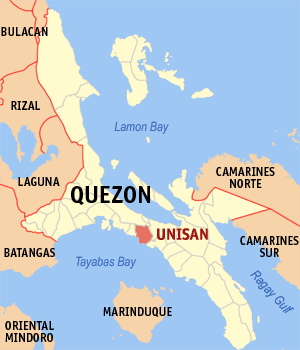
- Map of Quezon with Unisan highlighted
- Interactive map of Unisan
- Location within the Philippines
- Coordinates: 13°50′29″N 121°58′31″E
- Country: Philippines
- Region: Calabarzon
- Province: Quezon
- District: 3rd district
- Founded: 1521 or 1578
- Reestablished: February 18, 1876
- Founder: Malay settlers (1521); Juan de Plasencia and Diego de Oropesa (1578)
- Barangays: 36 (see Barangays)

Government
  - Type: Sangguniang Bayan
  - Mayor: Jose Mumar P. Veluz
  - Vice Mayor: Filomena M. Cabutihan
  - Representative: Reynante U. Arrogancia
  - Municipal Council: Members: Cristina M. Caper; Crizper P. Magnaye; Pilipino V. Villapando; Ruel F. Manalo; Jose C. Vera Cruz; Diomedes M. Talavera; Jovert A. Galang; Anre L. Mimay; Adelfa A. Ablaza; Benhur L. Deveza
  - Electorate: 19,107 voters (2025)

Area
  - Total: 124.15 km^{2} (47.93 sq mi)
- Elevation: 21 m (69 ft)
- Highest elevation: 172 m (564 ft)
- Lowest elevation: 0 m (0 ft)

Population (2024 census)
  - Total: 25,357
  - Density: 204.24/km^{2} (528.99/sq mi)
  - Households: 6,697
- Demonym: Unisanin

Economy
  - Income class: 3rd municipal income class
  - Poverty incidence: 7.09% (2023)
  - Revenue: ₱ 151.8 million (2024)
  - Assets: ₱ 398.9 million (2024)
  - Expenditure: ₱ 46.36 million (2024)
  - Liabilities: ₱ 62.45 million (2024)

Service provider
  - Electricity: Quezon 1 Electric Cooperative (QUEZELCO 1)
- Time zone: UTC+8 (PST)
- ZIP code: 4305
- PSGC: 0405649000
- IDD : area code: +63 (0)42
- Native languages: Tagalog

Unisan, officially the Municipality of Unisan (Tagalog: Bayan ng Unisan), is a municipality in the province of Quezon, Philippines. According to the 2024 census, it has a population of 25,357 people.

== Etymology ==
The name of Unisan may have been derived from the Spanish verb unir, meaning "unite". At that time inhabitants, which were composed of strangers from different parts of the island, were united and wanted to call the town Unisan, a corruption of the words union and unidos for the sake of euphony.

There is another, more plausible version which related that the name was derived from the Latin words uni-sancti, meaning "one saint" or "in honor of a saint", possibly referring to Friar Pedro Bautista, once a missionary to Unisan when this town was still Kalilayan and later canonized saint following his martyrdom while a missionary in Japan. Uni-Sancti was made Unisan for short and to suit the Visayan and Caviteño tongues.

== History ==
Unisan, originally called Kalilayan. During the latter part of the 19th century, legends said that the real founder of the town was a Malayan queen called of Ladya. Hence her title was "Queen of Kalilayan".

It is believed that the founding occurred in the Middle Ages when immigration of the Malayans to this country was still predominant. That was before the advent of Islam in the East Indies. This proven by the fact that no traces of Mohamed's Creed were found in that part of the Philippines when the Europeans arrived.

The name Kalilayan derived from the Tagalog root word lilay, refers to a kind of palm similar to buri with the smaller leaves in the size of anahaw leaves that once grew in abundance.

The town was designated as the first capital of the province of Kalilayan from the province's creation in 1591 to 1749, when the capital was transferred to the town of Tayabas. In 1754, it was unified with Pitogo then separated as a town and became an independent municipality in February 1876. At the same time, it was renamed to Unisan which was derived from the Latin word uni-sancti, meaning "holy saint".

== Geography ==
Unisan is located on the central part of the province. It is bounded to the north by Atimonan, to the south by the Tayabas Bay, to the west by Agdangan, and to the east by Gumaca and Pitogo. It is 57 kilometres (35 mi) from Lucena and 187 kilometres (116 mi) from Manila.

=== Barangays ===
Unisan is politically subdivided into 36 barangays, as indicated below. Each barangay consists of puroks and some have sitios.

San Roque was formerly a sitio of barrio Tagumpay.

- Almacén
- Balagtás
- Balanacan
- Bonifacio
- Bulo Ibabâ
- Bulo Ilaya
- Burgos
- Cabulihan Ibabâ
- Cabulihan Ilaya
- Caigdál
- F. De Jesús (Poblacion)
- General Luna
- Kalilayan Ibabâ
- Kalilayan Ilaya
- Mabini
- Mairok Ibaba
- Mairok Ilayang
- Malvar
- Maputat
- Muliguin
- Pagaguasan
- Panaon Ibabâ
- Panaon Ilaya
- Pláridel
- Poctol
- Punta
- R. Lapu-lapu (Poblacion)
- R. Magsaysay (Poblacion)
- Raja Solimán (Poblacion)
- Rizal Ibabâ
- Rizal Ilaya
- San Roque
- Socorro
- Tagumpay
- Tubas
- Tubigan

=== Town proper ===
The town center (poblacion) consists of 4 barangays, R. Soliman, Ramon Magsaysay, Lapu-lapu and F. de Jesus. The heart of the town is the Catholic Church, comprising several blocks. The Unisan Central Elementary School is on the southeastern side of the church, while the Government Center is located at the back of the school which consists of Municipal Hall, Municipal Library, Fire Station, Police Station, Comelec Building and the Association of Barangay Captains (ABC) building. Remedios Etorma Suarez Memorial Auditorium (RESMA), a well used spot for programs and events is on the same government center, while just across the auditorium is the Unisan National High School.

The Tamesis Park, named after a prominent Unisanin, Florencio Tamesis, the first Filipino director of the Bureau of Forestry and considered by experts as the father of Philippine Forestry, is likewise located at the center of the town, just across the Church Basketball Court. The old municipal building, now a proud heritage building of Unisan, is on the southwest corner of the poblacion, near the Kalilayan River.

=== Climate ===
Climate data for Unisan, Quezon
Month	Jan	Feb	Mar	Apr	May	Jun	Jul	Aug	Sep	Oct	Nov	Dec	Year
Mean daily maximum °C (°F)	26 (79)	27 (81)	29 (84)	31 (88)	31 (88)	30 (86)	29 (84)	29 (84)	29 (84)	29 (84)	28 (82)	26 (79)	29 (84)
Mean daily minimum °C (°F)	22 (72)	22 (72)	22 (72)	23 (73)	24 (75)	24 (75)	24 (75)	24 (75)	24 (75)	24 (75)	23 (73)	23 (73)	23 (74)
Average precipitation mm (inches)	83 (3.3)	55 (2.2)	44 (1.7)	37 (1.5)	90 (3.5)	123 (4.8)	145 (5.7)	125 (4.9)	135 (5.3)	166 (6.5)	163 (6.4)	152 (6.0)	1,318 (51.8)
Average rainy days	15.1	10.8	11.9	11.4	19.9	23.7	26.3	23.9	23.9	22.1	20.2	18.6	227.8
Source: Meteoblue

== Demographics ==
Population census of Unisan
Year	Pop.	±% p.a.
1903	2,692	—
1918	5,431	+4.79%
1939	11,464	+3.62%
1948	9,290	−2.31%
1960	12,285	+2.36%
1970	15,550	+2.38%
1975	17,318	+2.18%
1980	18,230	+1.03%
1990	19,851	+0.86%
1995	21,509	+1.51%
2000	21,252	−0.26%
2007	23,911	+1.64%
2010	25,186	+1.91%
2015	26,884	+1.25%
2020	25,448	−1.15%
2024	25,357	−0.09%
Source: Philippine Statistics Authority

=== Religion ===
The dominant religion in Unisan is Roman Catholic. Other religions present are:

- United Church of Christ in the Philippines
- Iglesia ni Cristo
- Jehovah's Witnesses
- Born again

==== Saint Peter the Apostle Parish ====
The foundation of Calilayan, the capital of the old province of Calilayan, by Friars Juan de Plasencia and Diego de Oropesa started in 1578. The first church was made of bamboo and nipa. In 1589, Friar Pedro Bautista obtained the permission to rebuild it with wood. Friar Alonso Bañon administered Calilayan after 1595. Friar Jode de la Concepcion was Guardian of the convent in 1597. Friar Pedro de Alcazar administered the pueblo in 1600 and 1601. Friar Juan Manso was the religious minister in 1602. Friar Diego de la Magdalena, a member of the 6th Mission that arrived in the Philippines in 1594, also administered Calilayan. In 1605, Calilayan was ravaged by the Moros. Of the 9,000 residents, barely 1,000 survived the attack. The survivors took refuge near the Palsabangon River, where the missionaries, among whom was Friar Pedro de san Buenaventura, built a church, a convent and school buildings with bamboo and nipa. Friar Juan de Mérida administered Palsabangon in 1609. In 1613, because of crocodiles, the people relocated to the sitio of Cabuyao, where Friar de Mérida built a church and a convent with wood and school buildings with bamboo and nipa. The people lived peacefully in Cabuyao until 1635, when the Moros attacked again.

Some 800 survivors took refuge in the sitios of Atimonan and Minanucan (now barrion Talaba in Atimonan). Hence, for many years the town of Calilayan was totally abandoned. From 1620 onwards, a certain Gregorio Vicente united various families from Cabuyao with wandering descendants of those who had lived in Calilayan and Palsabangon, and he and all these people fixed there residence in the site of old Calilayan---the delta east of the Calilayan River---without recognizing any civil or religious authority. They lived there until 1637 when the Government saw the need to burn the town. Finally in 1874 or 1875, the town was established in the outskirts of the old Calilayan. During its early years, Unisan was administered by Fr. Marcos Tolentino, a secular priest. In 1945, during World War II, the church was partially destroyed; it was reconstructed by the Philippine Historical Commission in 1966.

==== Saint Roche Parish (Barangay Panaon) ====
Established in 1962 by Father Ruben Profugo (later Bishop of the Diocese of Lucena), the Parokya ni San Roque was formerly a small church attached to the Parish of St. Peter in the town proper and served by the priest/chaplains of the Holy Child Jesus Institute (Dominican Academy). The parish comprises the barangays of Ibabang Bulo, Ilayang Bulo, Ibabang Mairok, Ilayang Mairok, Almacen, Bonifacio, Burgos, Ilayang Panaon, Ibabang Panaon, Tubigan, Plaridel, Ibabang Rizal, Ilayang Rizal, Socorro and Poctol. Most of the people are farmers. The church itself stands in the midst of rice fields. The priests who served Panaon either as parish priest or administrator include Fr. Antonio Salvo, Fr. Froilan Zalameda, Fr. Jose Dural, Fr. Dario Endiape, Fr. Quirino Macatangay, Fr. Jose Erlito Ebron, Fr. Alvin Cabungcal, Fr. Edwin Panergo, Fr. Isagani Reyes, Fr. Rolando Grecia, Fr. Benjamin Rhoda, Fr. Dennis Vargas and Fr. Claude Calvendra. Major Renovation of the church was done during the term of Fr. Roda.

Saint Peter the Apostle Parish and Saint Roche Parish are members of Roman Catholic Diocese of Lucena.

== Economy ==
Poverty incidence of Unisan (%)

Source: Philippine Statistics Authority

The economy of Unisan is sustained by fishing and agriculture, as well as commercial businesses and resorts.

== Government ==
=== Mayors ===
List of former municipal mayors from 1941 onwards:

- Gerardo M. Maxino 1941–1945
- Pedro Constantino, Jr (Appointed) 1945–1946
- Romualdo Vargas 1946–1955
- Joaquin M. Carillo 1955–1967
- Ramoncito C. Vera Cruz 1968–1972
- Arturo I. Constantino, Sr. 1972–1980; Re-elected in 1980 but died a few days after assuming office
- Ramoncito C. Vera Cruz (Elected Vice Mayor, became Mayor when Mayor Arturo Constantino died in March, 1980) 1980–1986
- Joselito V. Tolentino (OIC) 1986–1987; Elected 1988–1992
- Nonato E. Puache 1992–2001
- Cesar P. Alpay 2001–2004
- Nonato E. Puache 2004–2007
- Cesar P. Alpay 2007–2010
- Nonato E. Puache 2010–2019
- Ferdinand P. Adulta 2019–2025
- Jose Mumar "Omar" P. Veluz 2025–Present

Appointed OIC:

- Rodolfo B. Matociños 12-01-1987 to 01-01-1988
- Renato V. Tolentino 01-01-1988 to 02-03-1988

Prominent Mayors in the pre-war era include, among others: Atty. Francisco Deveza De Jesus (whom Barangay F. De Jesus was named after), Dr. Teodorico V. Valerio, Dionisio V. Valerio, and Eulogio Fernandez

Several Mayors in the same era were surnamed Constantino and Isaac, two prominent names in the municipality

=== Congressional district ===
Unisan belongs to Quezon's 3rd congressional district since 1987. The said congressional district also includes Agdangan, Buenavista, Catanauan, General Luna, Macalelon, Mulanay, Padre Burgos, Pitogo, San Andres, San Francisco and San Narciso.

It was previously represented as part of Quezon's 2nd congressional district, Quezon's at-large district, and Region IV-A.

== Culture ==
=== Events and festivals ===
- Santo Niño Festival - (3rd Sunday of January)
- Cocolilay Festival - February 18
- Dinilawang Manok Festival - February 18
- Unisan Day - February 18
- Holy Week-The Passion of Christ/Senakulo - Lenten season
- Flores De Mayo - (Last Sunday of May)
- Flores De Maria/Tapusan - (Last Day of May)
- Feast of Saint Peter the Apostle (Town Fiesta) - June 29
- Puto Bao Festival dito ang Original nyan!

During the month of February is the annual celebration of CocoLilay Festival, wherein the coconut tree and the Lilay Tree is the main attraction of the festivities. The festival is highlighted by a street dancing competition participated by the residents of different barangays, as well as by elementary and high school students.

In the later part of 2011, the Dinilawang Manok Festival was held in the town. However, it was replaced again by CocoLilay Festival in the succeeding years to give importance to the town's history.

== Education ==
The Unisan Schools District Office governs all educational institutions within the municipality. It oversees the management and operations of all private and public, from primary to secondary schools.

=== Primary and elementary schools ===
- Almacen Elementary School
- Beredo Elementary School
- Bienvinido S. Lat Elementary School
- Bonifacio Elementary School
- Cabulihan Elementary School
- Caigdal Elementary School
- Dominican Academy
- Kalilayan Elementary School
- Muliguin Elementary School
- Mabini Elementary School
- Panaon Elementary School
- Poctol Elementary School
- Punta Elementary School
- Santayana Elementary School
- San Roque Elementary School
- Unisan Central Elementary School

=== Secondary schools ===
- Caigdal National High School
- Dominican Academy
- Leonarda Deveza Vera Cruz National High School
- Unisan Integrated High School

=== Higher educational institution ===
- Polytechnic University of the Philippines (Unisan Campus)

== Notable personalities ==
- Danilo Suarez - former Governor of Quezon and Representative of the 3rd District of Quezon
- David C. Suarez - former Governor of Quezon, former Vice Governor of Quezon, former councilor of Unisan, and incumbent Representative of the 2nd District of Quezon
- Louie Alas - basketball coach

First	Capital of Kalilayan; 1591–1749	Succeeded by Tayabas as Capital of Tayabas
