= General Luna, Quezon =

Municipality in Quezon, Philippines

General Luna Hingoso
- Municipality
- Municipality of General Luna
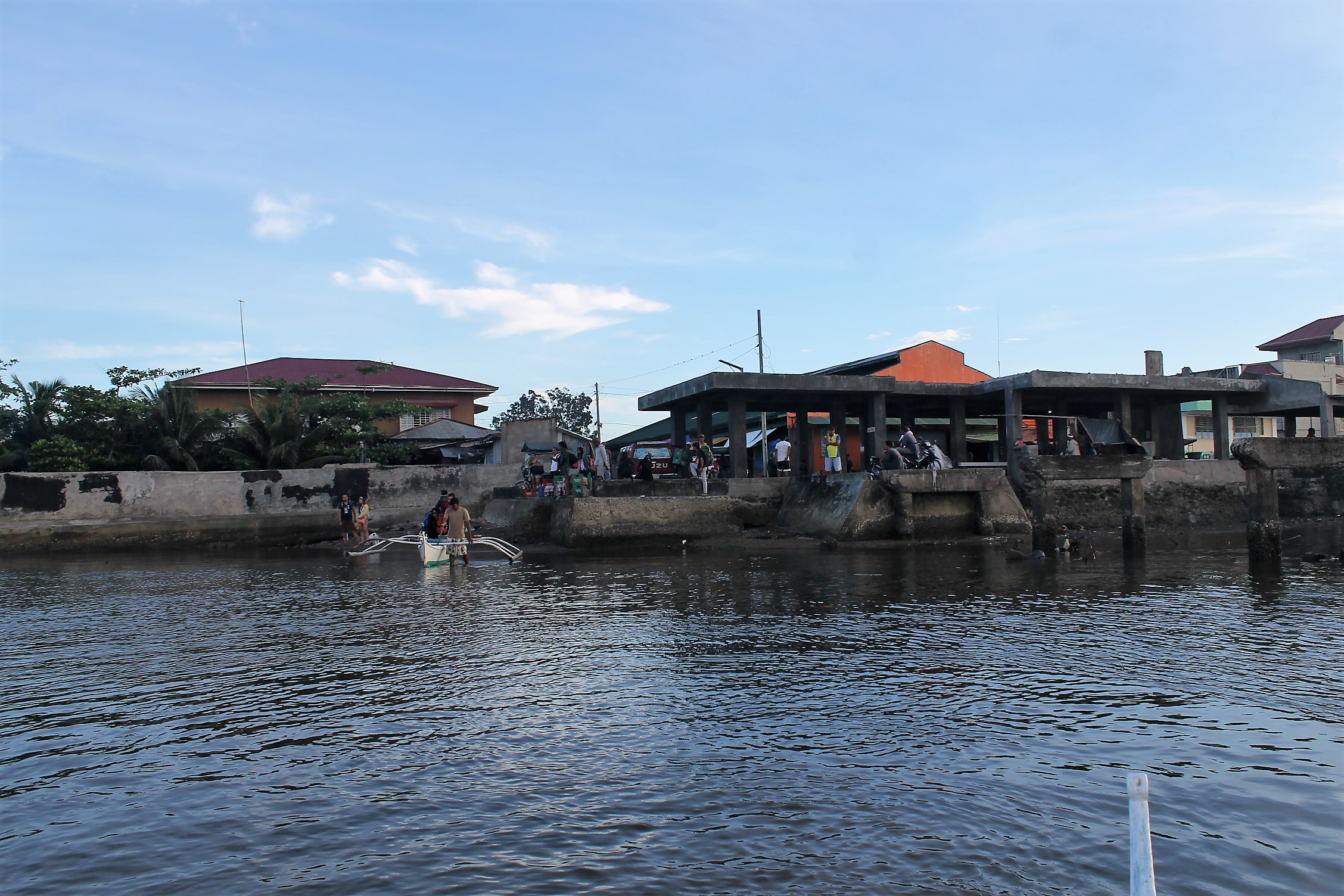
- General Luna Port

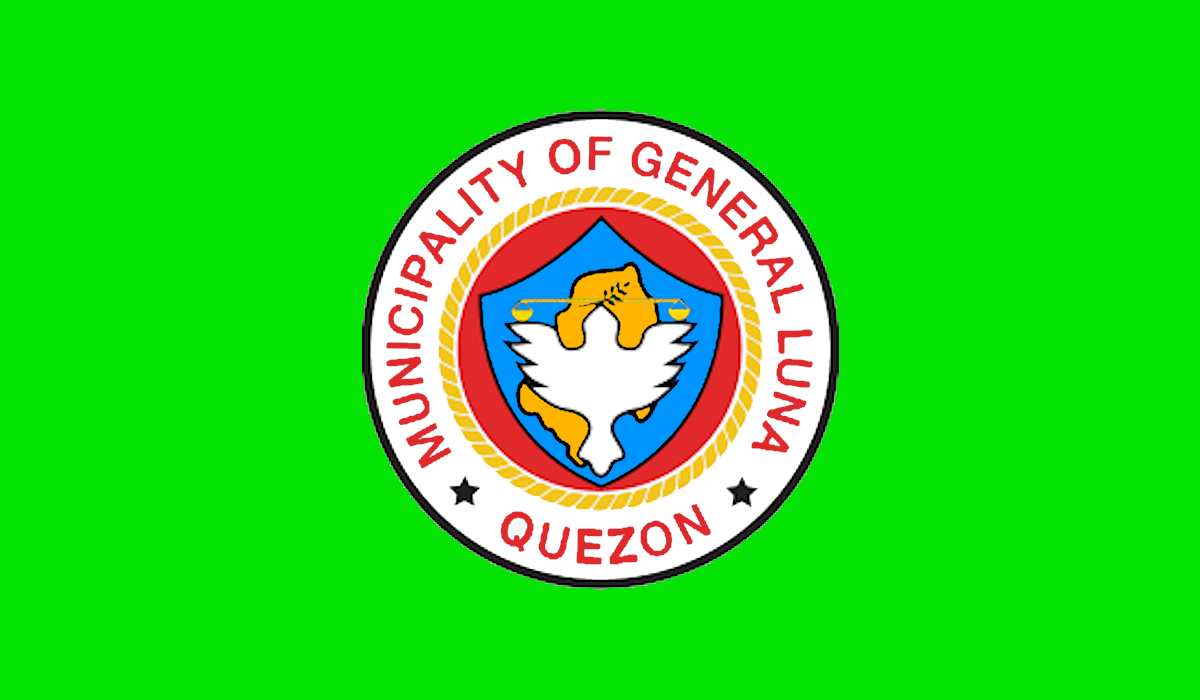
- Flag

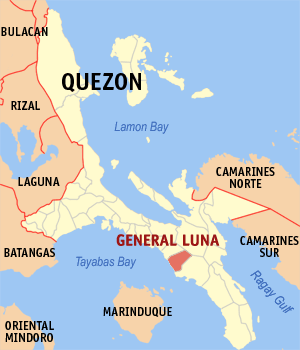
- Map of Quezon with General Luna highlighted
- Interactive map of General Luna
- Location within the Philippines
- Coordinates: 13°41′17″N 122°10′15″E
- Country: Philippines
- Region: Calabarzon
- Province: Quezon
- District: 3rd district
- Founded: November 1, 1929
- Named for: Antonio Luna
- Barangays: 27 (see Barangays)

Government
  - Type: Sangguniang Bayan
  - Mayor: Jose Stevenson "Benson" Sangalang (STAN Q)
  - Vice Mayor: Melaica M. Batariano (AKSYON)
  - Representative: Reynante U. Arrogancia (STAN Q)
  - Municipal Council: Members: Mark Lloyd E. Sangalang (STAN Q); Capt.Jojo Plata (STAN Q); Myra Gunay (STAN Q); Melquisedec T. Zurbito (AKSYON); Axl Atienza (AKSYON); Jovito P. Red (AKSYON); Joy Garcia (STAN Q); Kuya Monching Paras (STAN Q)
  - Electorate: 18,549 voters (2025)

Area
  - Total: 101.02 km^{2} (39.00 sq mi)
- Elevation: 14 m (46 ft)
- Highest elevation: 96 m (315 ft)
- Lowest elevation: 0 m (0 ft)

Population (2024 census)
  - Total: 25,110
  - Density: 248.6/km^{2} (643.8/sq mi)
  - Households: 6,119
- Demonym: General Lunahin/ Heneral Lunahin

Economy
  - Income class: 3rd municipal income class
  - Poverty incidence: 11.07% (2023)
  - Revenue: ₱ 140.6 million (2024)
  - Assets: ₱ 338.3 million (2024)
  - Expenditure: ₱ 43.88 million (2024)
  - Liabilities: ₱ 105.8 million (2024)

Service provider
  - Electricity: Quezon 1 Electric Cooperative (QUEZELCO 1)
- Time zone: UTC+8 (PST)
- ZIP code: 4310
- PSGC: 0405616000
- IDD : area code: +63 (0)42
- Native languages: Tagalog
- Website: www.generallunaquezon.gov.ph

General Luna, officially the Municipality of General Luna (Tagalog: Bayan ng Heneral Luna), is a municipality in the province of Quezon, Philippines. According to the 2024 census, it has a population of 25,110 people.

It is named after Antonio Luna, the Commanding General of the Philippine Revolutionary Army.

== History ==
General Luna is originally a sitio of Macalelon, known as Hingoso. Hingoso's name is derived from local folklore, where it is said that early coastal inhabitants would say “Hinging Suso”, a Tagalog phrase, before gathering edible shells called "suso" to prevent misfortune, and another tale attributes the name to a misunderstanding between a local carrier of "suso" and Spaniards, who later named the place as Hingoso.

The mountainous region of Hingoso was once home to Aeta families, some of whom later settled in the lowlands as the first settlers. Before Spanish colonization, Visayan families from Simara Island, Romblon, were the first migrants, followed by kaingeros, loggers, and settlers from the Visayas, Bicol, and Marinduque, attracted by Hingoso’s vast forests.

In 1929, seven residents of Hingoso met with Tayabas Governor Leon Guinto to ask for the secession of Hingoso from Macalelon. Finally, on November 1, 1929, Governor-General Dwight F. Davis issued Executive Order No. 207, creating the municipality of General Luna. The town initially composed of two barangays—Basyao and Kalanggan—out of the eleven sitios of Hingoso.

== Geography ==
The town is located in the southwestern portion of the Quezon province, along the coast of Tayabas Bay. It is one of the twelve municipalities covered by the Bondoc Peninsula.

General Luna is 110 kilometers (68 mi) from Lucena and 240 kilometers (150 mi) from Manila.

=== Barangays ===
General Luna is politically subdivided into 27 barangays, as indicated below. Each barangay consists of puroks and some have sitios.

- Bacong Ibaba
- Bacong Ilaya
- Barangay 1 (Poblacion)
- Barangay 2 (Poblacion)
- Barangay 3 (Poblacion)
- Barangay 4 (Poblacion)
- Barangay 5 (Poblacion)
- Barangay 6 (Poblacion)
- Barangay 7 (Poblacion)
- Barangay 8 (Poblacion)
- Barangay 9 (Poblacion)
- Lavides
- Magsaysay
- Malaya
- Nieva
- Recto
- San Ignacio Ibaba
- San Ignacio Ilaya
- San Isidro Ibaba
- San Isidro Ilaya
- San Jose
- San Nicolas
- San Vicente
- Santa Maria Ibaba
- Santa Maria Ilaya
- Sumilang
- Villarica

=== Climate ===
Climate data for General Luna, Quezon
Month	Jan	Feb	Mar	Apr	May	Jun	Jul	Aug	Sep	Oct	Nov	Dec	Year
Mean daily maximum °C (°F)	26 (79)	27 (81)	29 (84)	31 (88)	31 (88)	31 (88)	29 (84)	29 (84)	29 (84)	29 (84)	28 (82)	26 (79)	29 (84)
Mean daily minimum °C (°F)	22 (72)	22 (72)	23 (73)	23 (73)	24 (75)	25 (77)	24 (75)	24 (75)	24 (75)	24 (75)	24 (75)	23 (73)	24 (74)
Average precipitation mm (inches)	58 (2.3)	41 (1.6)	32 (1.3)	29 (1.1)	91 (3.6)	143 (5.6)	181 (7.1)	162 (6.4)	172 (6.8)	164 (6.5)	113 (4.4)	121 (4.8)	1,307 (51.5)
Average rainy days	13.4	9.3	9.1	9.8	19.1	22.9	26.6	24.9	25.0	21.4	16.5	16.5	214.5
Source: Meteoblue

== Demographics ==
Population census of General Luna
Year	Pop.	±% p.a.
1939	4,106	—
1948	4,680	+1.46%
1960	8,123	+4.70%
1970	13,966	+5.56%
1975	15,193	+1.70%
1980	16,526	+1.70%
1990	17,997	+0.86%
1995	20,956	+2.89%
2000	21,068	+0.11%
2007	23,379	+1.45%
2010	25,373	+3.02%
2015	26,494	+0.83%
2020	24,804	−1.38%
2024	25,110	+0.29%
Source: Philippine Statistics Authority

== Economy ==
Poverty incidence of General Luna (%)

Source: Philippine Statistics Authority

The economy of General Luna is heavily agricultural. There are two major economic activities in the municipality, which are farming and fishing.

== Culture ==
The Buhay na Kubol is celebrated in the town every year during Holy Week. Residents act out the Stations of the Cross, with locals acting as Jesus Christ and other Biblical figures as a way of showing devotion. The sets are constructed by local artists. Self-flagellation using whips is also practiced as an act of penitence and to share in Christ's pain

=== Churches ===
- San Ignacio de Loyola Parish (est. 1937)
- San Lorenzo Ruíz Parish

== Education ==
The General Luna Schools District Office governs all educational institutions within the municipality. It oversees the management and operations of all private and public, from primary to secondary schools.

=== Primary and elementary schools ===
- Bacong Ibaba Elementary School
- Bacong Ilaya Elementary School
- Gaudencio M. Sangalang Academy
- Gen. Luna Central School
- Lavides Elementary School
- Magsaysay Elementary School
- Malaya Elementary School
- Nieva Elementary School
- Saint Ignatius Parochial School
- San Ignacio Ibaba Elementary School
- San Ignacio Ilaya Elementary School
- San Isidro Elementary School
- San Nicolas Elementary School
- San Vicente Elementary School
- Sumilang Elementary School
- Villarica Elementary School

=== Secondary schools ===
- General Luna National High School
- Malaya National High School
- San Isidro National High School
- Sergio Balane Integrated School
