= San Francisco, Quezon =

Municipality in Quezon, Philippines

San Francisco Aurora
- Municipality
- Municipality of San Francisco
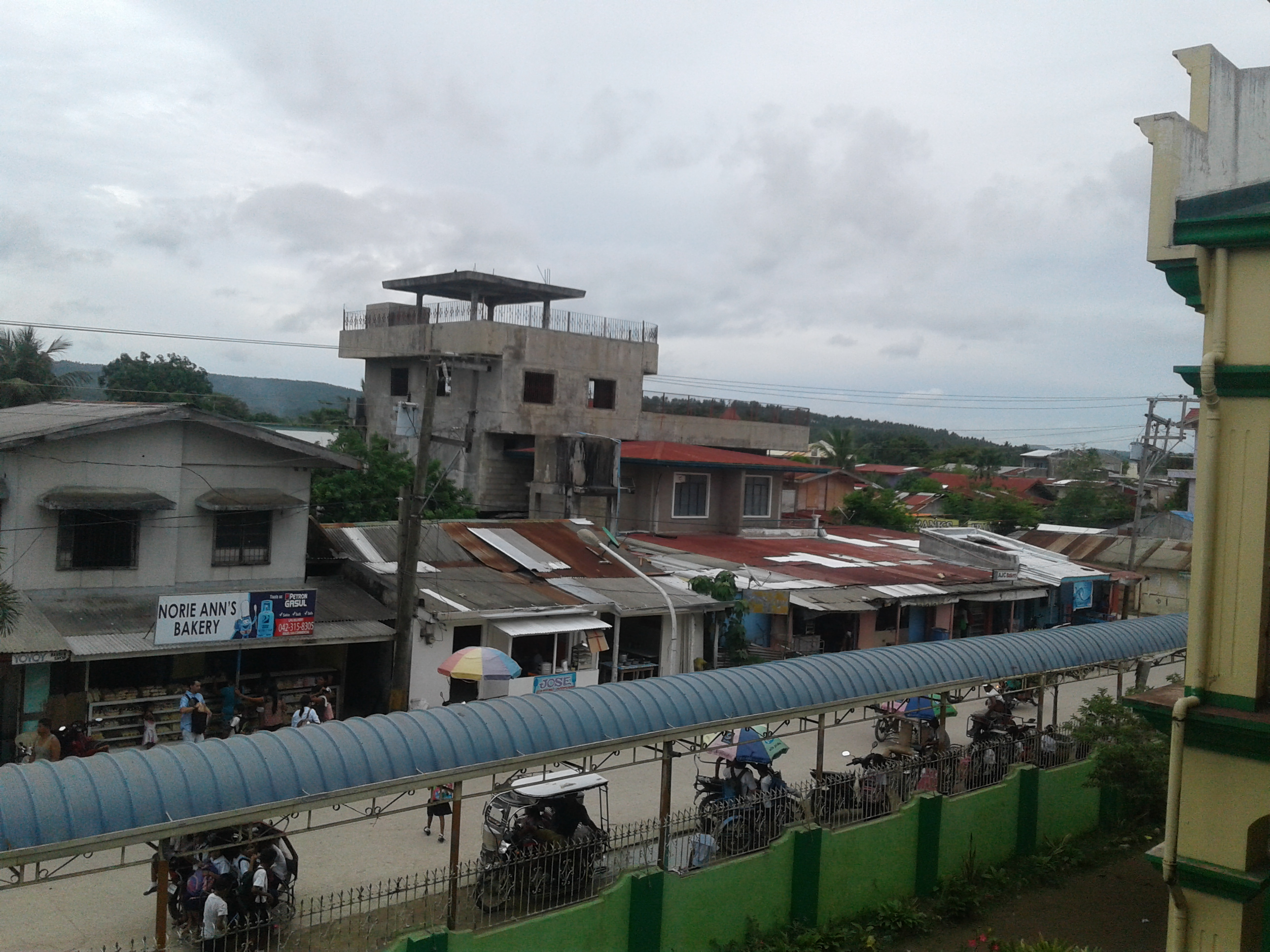
- Town proper

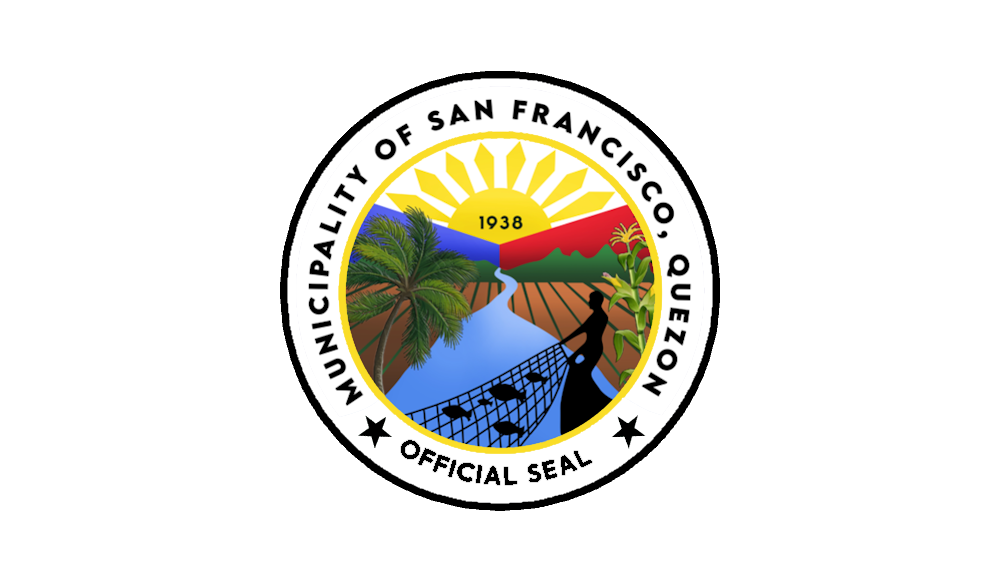
- Flag Seal

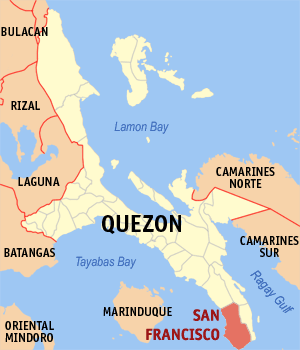
- Map of Quezon with San Francisco highlighted
- Interactive map of San Francisco
- Location within the Philippines
- Coordinates: 13°21′N 122°31′E
- Country: Philippines
- Region: Calabarzon
- Province: Quezon
- District: 3rd district
- Founded: April 27, 1938
- Renamed: May 11, 1940 (as Aurora); June 17, 1967 (as San Francisco)
- Named for: St. Francis of Assisi
- Barangays: 16 (see Barangays)

Government
  - Type: Sangguniang Bayan
  - Mayor: Hon. Joselito “Litoy” R. Alega
  - Vice Mayor: Hon. Jean Chriscelene “Kzel” Alega-Floresta
  - Representative: Reynante U. Arrogancia
  - Municipal Council: Members: Jazzy D. Alega; Rara Aguila; Ruby Aguila; Arabis Welsing; Garcia Ryan; Atienza Ava; Jao Don Don; Jorquia Jay Ar
  - Electorate: 46,153 voters (2025)

Area
  - Total: 303.96 km^{2} (117.36 sq mi)
- Elevation: 55 m (180 ft)
- Highest elevation: 445 m (1,460 ft)
- Lowest elevation: 0 m (0 ft)

Population (2024 census)
  - Total: 63,789
  - Density: 209.86/km^{2} (543.53/sq mi)
  - Households: 14,630
- Demonym(s): Taga-San Francisco, Aurorahin

Economy
  - Income class: 1st municipal income class
  - Poverty incidence: 17.29% (2023)
  - Revenue: ₱ 290.8 million (2024)
  - Assets: ₱ 674.3 million (2024)
  - Expenditure: ₱ 278.2 million (2024)
  - Liabilities: ₱ 209.6 million (2024)

Service provider
  - Electricity: Quezon 1 Electric Cooperative (QUEZELCO 1)
- Time zone: UTC+8 (PST)
- ZIP code: 4315
- PSGC: 0405642000
- IDD : area code: +63 (0)42
- Native languages: Tagalog
- Website: lgusanfranciscoquezon.gov.ph

San Francisco, officially the Municipality of San Francisco (Tagalog: Bayan ng San Francisco), is a municipality in the province of Quezon, Philippines. According to the 2024 census, it has a population of 63,789 people.

It was formerly called Bondo from its establishment as a town from 1938 to 1940, and Aurora from 1940 to 1967.

== Etymology ==
The name of the town was derived from Spanish for Saint Francis of Assisi. It was formerly known as Bondo (from the Tagalog word bundok, meaning "mountain"), and later renamed as Aurora (after First Lady Aurora Quezon).

== History ==
The origins of the municipality of San Francisco, formerly known as Barrio Bondo, are unclear prior to the arrival of the Spaniards in 1521. It was a forested, mountainous area with early Chinese influences, evidenced by artifacts from the Ming and Sung dynasties found along its shores. In 1784, Barrio Bondo was established under leaders Juan de Torres, Manuel Cuyo, and Gregorio Palacio. Frequent Moro pirate raids forced villagers to relocate to higher ground at Sitio Kampana for protection.

In 1898, Barrio Bondo briefly became the independent municipality of San Emilio, but financial constraints led it to revert to being part of Mulanay by 1904.

=== Establishment as a municipality ===
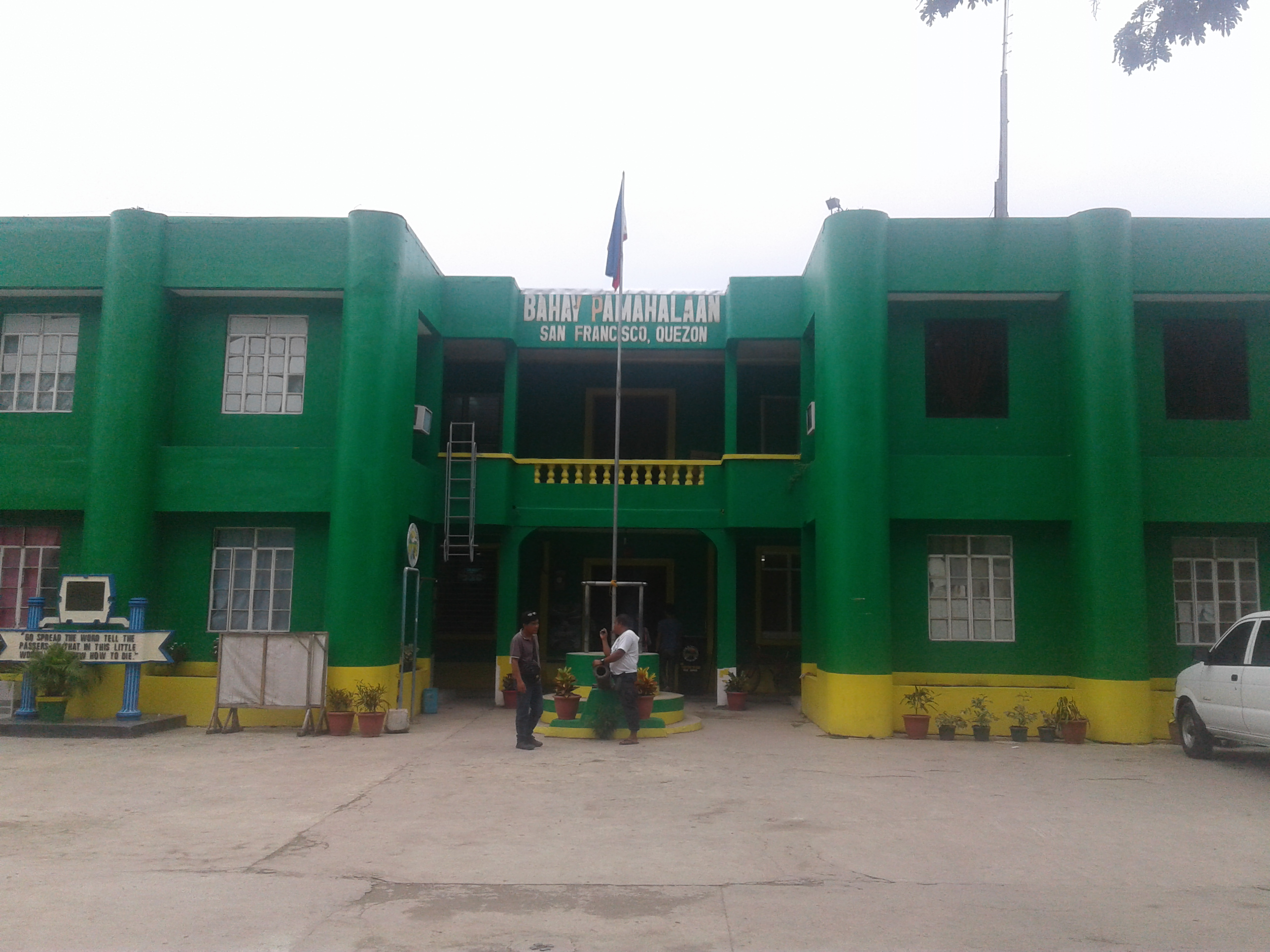
Old San Francisco Municipal Hall

In 1936, a group of eight men, led by Andres Castillejo, formed the Dakilang Mithi Association with the goal of separating Bondo from Mulanay to become an independent municipality. After the 1937 elections, Bondo natives gained control of the Mulanay Municipal Council and passed a resolution supporting Bondo's independence.

On April 16, 1938, Don Venancio Queblar, along with councilor Jose Allarey and Dakilang Mithi secretary Miguel Gutierez, invited President Manuel L. Quezon to visit barrio Bondo. Quezon accepted the invitation and, on April 27, 1938, declared Bondo an independent municipality on April 30, 1938, through Executive Order No. 152. The establishment took effect on July 1, 1938, with Queblar appointed as the first mayor. The town originally consisted of barrios Bondo, Cawayan, Inabuan, Ilayang Tayuman, Ibabang Tayuman, Kasay, Mañongon, Pagsangahan, and Silongin, with Bondo as the seat of municipal government.

=== Renaming ===
By virtue of the first municipal resolution, Bondo was to be renamed to Aurora, in honor of First Lady Aurora Quezon, the wife of President Quezon. On May 11, 1940, the town was renamed to Aurora by virtue of Commonwealth Act No. 527.

Later, the Aurora Municipal Council sponsored Resolution No. 2, series of 1962, seeking to change the town's name to San Francisco, in honor of the patron saint Francis of Assisi. The resolution was eventually sponsored by Quezon 2nd district Representative Eladio Caliwara, and on June 17, 1967, Republic Act No. 4977 was enacted to finally rename Aurora to San Francisco. The renaming finally distinguished it from Maria Aurora, also a municipality in Quezon at that time, before becoming part of Aurora province in 1979.

== Geography ==
Located at the southernmost part of the Bondoc Peninsula and of the province, it is 185 kilometers (115 mi) from Lucena and 315 kilometers (196 mi) from Manila.

=== Barangays ===
San Francisco is politically subdivided into 16 barangays, as indicated below. Each barangay consists of puroks and some have sitios.

- Butangiad
- Casay
- Cawayan I
- Cawayan II
- Don Juan Vercelos (Utod)
- Huyon-Uyon
- Ibabang Tayuman (Busdak)
- Ilayang Tayuman
- Inabuan
- Mabunga
- Nasalaan
- Pagsangahan
- Poblacion
- Pugon
- Santo Niño
- Silongin

=== Climate ===
Climate data for San Francisco, Quezon
Month	Jan	Feb	Mar	Apr	May	Jun	Jul	Aug	Sep	Oct	Nov	Dec	Year
Mean daily maximum °C (°F)	27 (81)	28 (82)	29 (84)	31 (88)	31 (88)	30 (86)	29 (84)	29 (84)	29 (84)	29 (84)	28 (82)	27 (81)	29 (84)
Mean daily minimum °C (°F)	21 (70)	21 (70)	21 (70)	23 (73)	24 (75)	25 (77)	24 (75)	24 (75)	24 (75)	23 (73)	23 (73)	22 (72)	23 (73)
Average precipitation mm (inches)	31 (1.2)	23 (0.9)	25 (1.0)	30 (1.2)	85 (3.3)	145 (5.7)	182 (7.2)	153 (6.0)	172 (6.8)	150 (5.9)	113 (4.4)	68 (2.7)	1,177 (46.3)
Average rainy days	11.3	8.5	9.7	11.3	18.3	23.2	26.6	25.4	25.9	24.2	19.7	15.2	219.3
Source: Meteoblue

== Demographics ==
Population census of San Francisco
Year	Pop.	±% p.a.
1903	1,330	—
1939	3,446	+2.68%
1948	4,338	+2.59%
1960	8,406	+5.67%
1970	16,954	+7.26%
1975	25,183	+8.26%
1980	33,928	+6.14%
1990	41,142	+1.95%
1995	43,457	+1.03%
2000	48,310	+2.30%
2007	53,286	+1.36%
2010	57,979	+3.12%
2015	61,473	+1.12%
2020	62,097	+0.21%
2024	63,789	+0.65%
Source: Philippine Statistics Authority

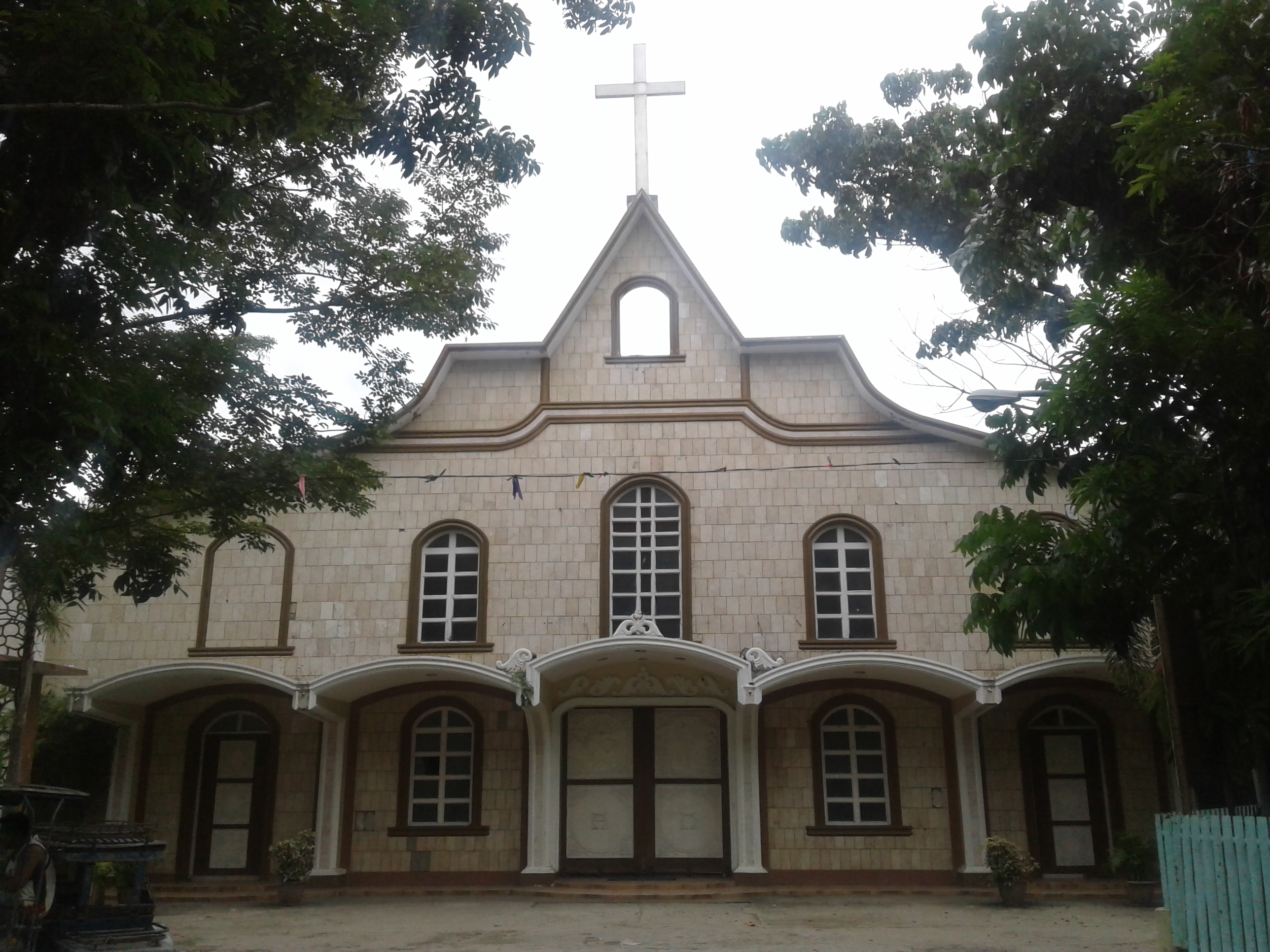
Saint Francis of Assisi Parish Church

== Economy ==
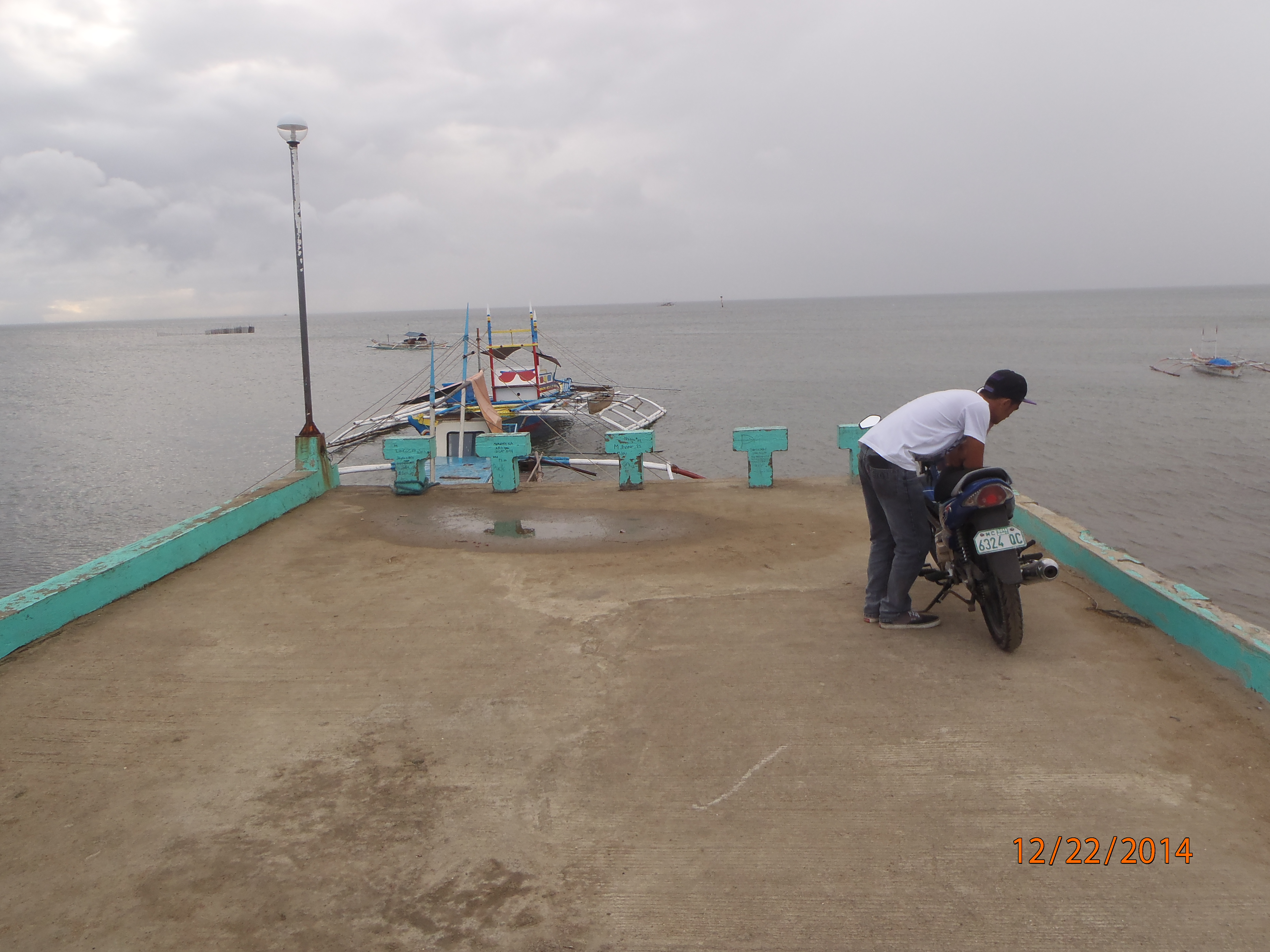
San Francisco Municipal Port

Poverty incidence of San Francisco (%)

Source: Philippine Statistics Authority

== Churches ==
- San Francisco de Asís Parish (est. 1954)
- Divina Misericordia Parish (est. 2008)

== Education ==
The San Francisco Schools District Office governs all educational institutions within the municipality. It oversees the management and operations of all private and public, from primary to secondary schools.

=== Primary and elementary school ===
- Andres Castillejo Elementary School
- Aurora Central Annex I Elementary School
- Aurora Elementary School
- Bayog Elementary School
- Busdak Elementary School
- Butanguiad Elementary School
- Casay Elementary School
- Cawayan II Elementary School
- Cumbahan Elementary School
- Don Juan Vercelos Elementary School
- Huyon-Uyon Elementary School
- Loawan Elementary School
- Look Awasan Elementary School
- Mabuhay Elementary School
- Mabunga Elementary School
- Gregorio G. Edano Sr. Elementary School
- Pagsangahan Elementary School
- Pantay Elementary School
- Pugon Elementary School
- San Francisco Adventist Elementary School
- San Francisco Parochial Academy
- Tayuman Elementary School
- Tumbaga Elementary School
- Utod Adventist Elementary School
- Viva Antipolo Elementary School

=== Secondary schools ===
- Bondoc Peninsula Institute
- Butanguiad National High School
- Casay National High School
- Dr. Vivencio V. Marquez National High School
- Huyon-Uyon National High School
- Jacinto G. Esplana National High School
- Renato Edaño Vicencio National High School
- Lualhati D. Edaño National High School
- Mabunga National High School
- Madagoldol Integrated School
- Marcial B. Villanueva National High School
- Pagsangahan National High School
- Pugon National High School
- Sto. Niño National High School
- Tumbaga National High School

== See also ==
- List of renamed cities and municipalities in the Philippines
