= Catanauan =

Municipality in Quezon, Philippines

- Municipality
- Municipality of Catanauan
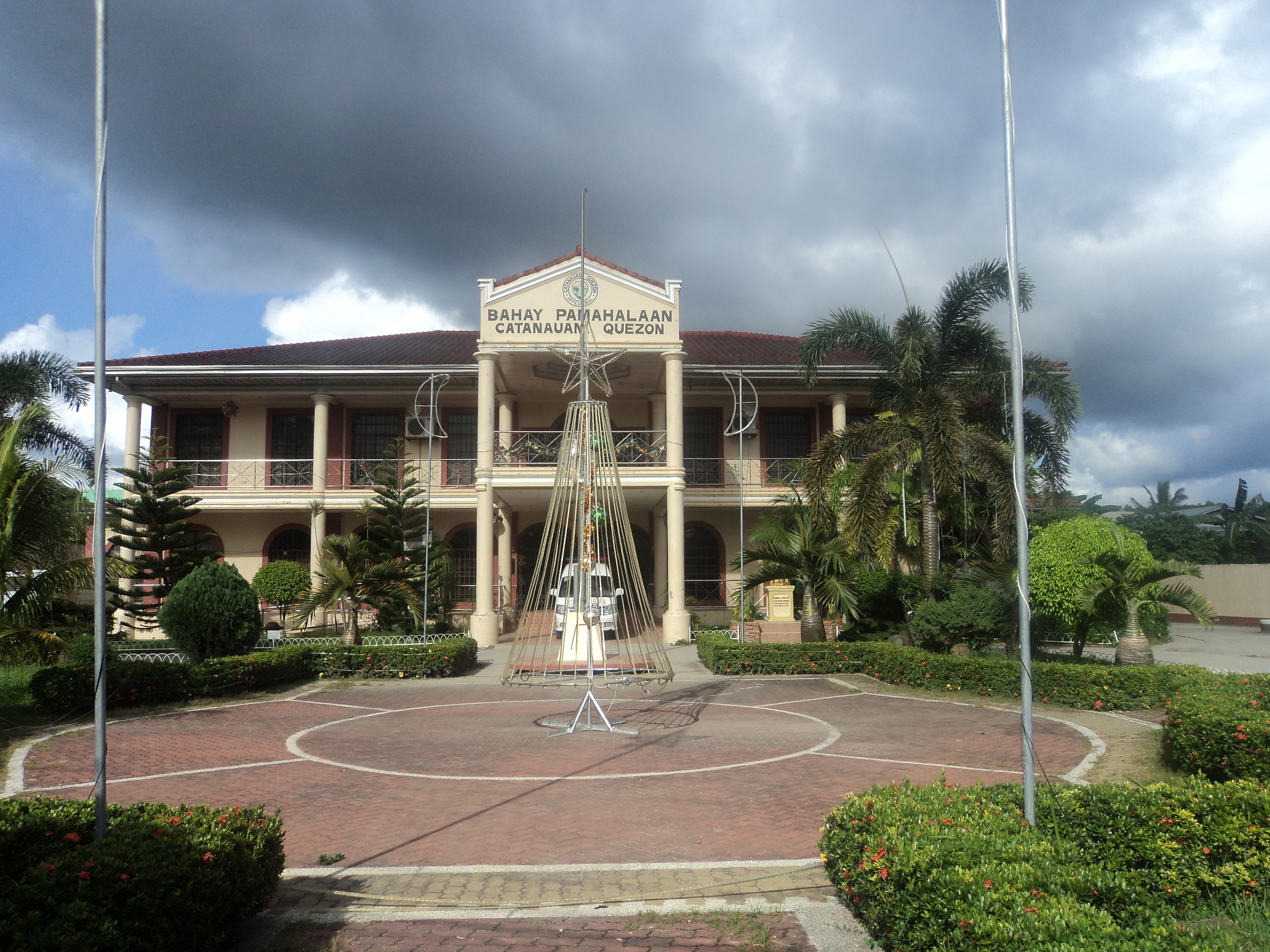
- Municipal Hall

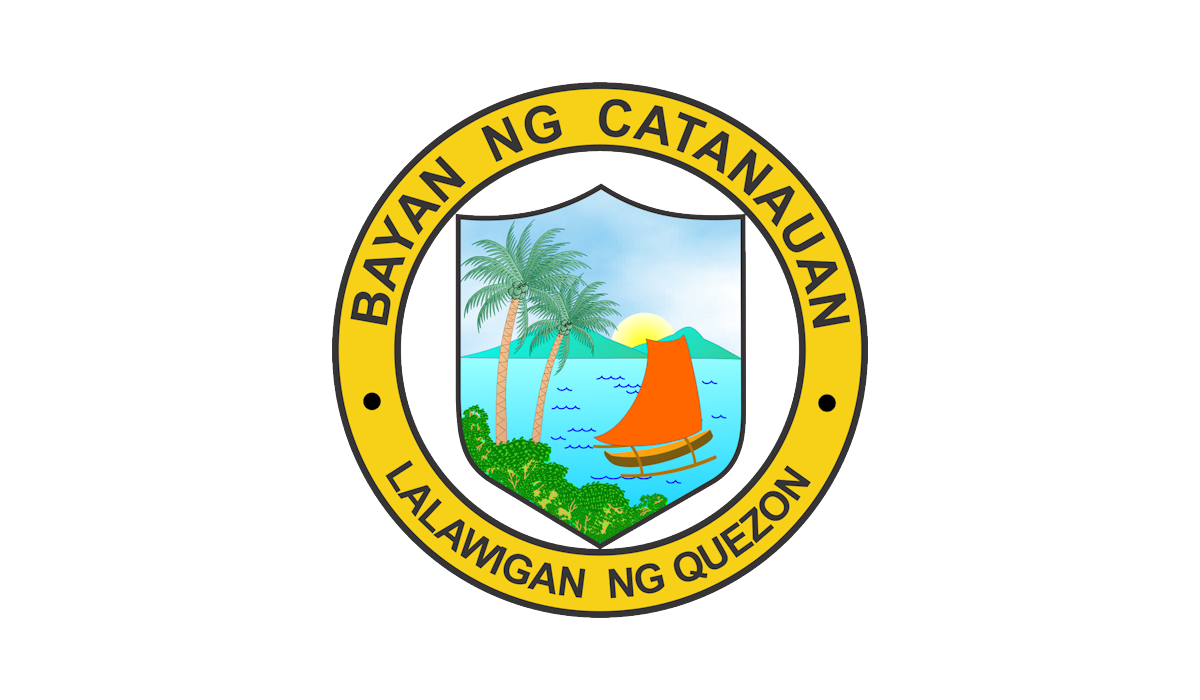
- Flag Seal
- Nickname: Heart of the Bondoc Peninsula
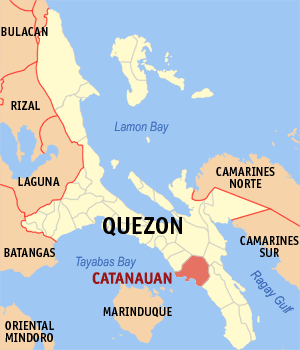
- Map of Quezon with Catanauan highlighted
- Interactive map of Catanauan
- Location within the Philippines
- Coordinates: 13°35′30″N 122°19′30″E
- Country: Philippines
- Region: Calabarzon
- Province: Quezon
- District: 3rd district
- Founded: January 20, 1686
- Barangays: 46 (see Barangays)

Government
  - Type: Sangguniang Bayan
  - Mayor: Ramon A. Orfanel
  - Vice Mayor: Manuel B. Montano
  - Representative: Reynante U. Arrogancia
  - Municipal Council: Members: Randy M. de Gala; Rodgie L. Casal; Rixon B. Comiso; John B. de Imus; Ederlinda S. Ramos; Rodolfo B. Pardilla; Mayla S. Natividad; Antonio Paterno A. Avila
  - Electorate: 45,870 voters (2025)

Area
  - Total: 253.07 km^{2} (97.71 sq mi)
- Elevation: 31 m (102 ft)
- Highest elevation: 199 m (653 ft)
- Lowest elevation: 0 m (0 ft)

Population (2024 census)
  - Total: 76,250
  - Density: 301.3/km^{2} (780.4/sq mi)
  - Households: 17,175
- Demonym: Catanauanin

Economy
  - Income class: 1st municipal income class
  - Poverty incidence: 12% (2023)
  - Revenue: ₱ 341.5 million (2024)
  - Assets: ₱ 1,317 million (2024)
  - Expenditure: ₱ 113.4 million (2024)
  - Liabilities: ₱ 343.3 million (2024)

Service provider
  - Electricity: Quezon 1 Electric Cooperative (QUEZELCO 1)
- Time zone: UTC+8 (PST)
- ZIP code: 4311
- PSGC: 0405610000
- IDD : area code: +63 (0)42
- Native languages: Ayta Kadi; Tagalog
- Website: www.catanauan.gov.ph

Catanauan, officially the Municipality of Catanauan (Tagalog: Bayan ng Catanauan), is a municipality in the province of Quezon, Philippines. According to the 2024 census, it has a population of 76,250 people.

== History ==
The existence of anauan as a pueblo (town) was first recorded in the map of Father Pedro Murillo dated on 1734. The petition dated 1685 of Bishop Andres Gonzales of Nueva Caceres, now known as Naga City in the Bicol Region, requesting the king of Spain to have Masbater and the Pueblo of Catanauan assigned to Recollect Order was reflective of the early creation of Catanauan. The recognized foundation date of the Municipality was January 20, 1686.

In the late 18th and 19th century, there were frequent Moro raids. These occurrences prompted the people to construct two small stone forts or watch towers (magkatanawan) mounted with artillery. Santa Maria watch tower was located at Lot 21 psc-2 near the present wharf is located. Castillo watch tower stood at the intersection of present Rizal and Boncan Street. Hence, the name Catanauan was so derived.

== Geography ==
The landscape of Catanauan is described as hilly, rolling and mountainous with isolated flat lands. The existing rivers and creeks serve as potential for effective drainage, more especially the Catanauan River. Catanuan has slopes ranging from 0–13% to 15% and above. The most elevated portion is at barangay San Jose which has a slope of 60% and greater. Susceptibility to erosion is directly proportional to the slope percentage and degree of susceptibility.

Catanauan is 135 kilometres (84 mi) from Lucena and 265 kilometres (165 mi) from Manila.

=== Barangays ===
Catanauan is politically subdivided into 46 barangays, as indicated below. Each barangay consists of puroks and some have sitios.

- Ajos
- Anusan
- Barangay 1 (Poblacion)
- Barangay 2 (Poblacion)
- Barangay 3 (Poblacion)
- Barangay 4 (Poblacion)
- Barangay 5 (Poblacion)
- Barangay 6 (Poblacion)
- Barangay 7 (Poblacion)
- Barangay 8 (Poblacion)
- Barangay 9 (Poblacion)
- Barangay 10(Poblacion)
- Bolo
- Bulagsong
- Camandiison
- Canculajao
- Catumbo
- Cawayanin Ibaba
- Cawayanin Ilaya
- Cutcutan
- Dahican
- Doongan Ibaba
- Doongan Ilaya
- Gatasan
- Macpac
- Madulao
- Matandang Sabang Kanluran
- Matandang Sabang Silangan
- Milagrosa
- Navitas
- Pacabit
- San Antonio Magcupa
- San Antonio Pala
- San Isidro
- San Jose (Anyao)
- San Pablo (Suha)
- San Roque (Uoyon)
- San Vicente Kanluran
- San Vicente Silangan
- Santa Maria (Dao)
- Tagabas Ibaba
- Tagabas Ilaya
- Tagbacan Ibaba
- Tagbacan Ilaya
- Tagbacan Silangan
- Tuhian

=== Climate ===
Climate data for Catanauan, Quezon
Month	Jan	Feb	Mar	Apr	May	Jun	Jul	Aug	Sep	Oct	Nov	Dec	Year
Mean daily maximum °C (°F)	27 (81)	28 (82)	30 (86)	32 (90)	31 (88)	30 (86)	29 (84)	29 (84)	29 (84)	29 (84)	29 (84)	28 (82)	29 (85)
Mean daily minimum °C (°F)	21 (70)	21 (70)	22 (72)	23 (73)	25 (77)	25 (77)	25 (77)	25 (77)	25 (77)	24 (75)	23 (73)	22 (72)	23 (74)
Average precipitation mm (inches)	31 (1.2)	23 (0.9)	25 (1.0)	30 (1.2)	85 (3.3)	145 (5.7)	182 (7.2)	153 (6.0)	172 (6.8)	150 (5.9)	113 (4.4)	68 (2.7)	1,177 (46.3)
Average rainy days	11.3	8.5	9.7	11.3	18.3	23.2	26.6	25.4	25.9	24.2	19.7	15.2	219.3
Source: Meteoblue (modeled/calculated data, not measured locally.)

== Demographics ==
Population census of Catanauan
Year	Pop.	±% p.a.
1903	4,108	—
1918	5,742	+2.26%
1939	10,416	+2.88%
1948	11,166	+0.78%
1960	17,168	+3.65%
1970	34,365	+7.18%
1975	38,473	+2.29%
1980	42,121	+1.83%
1990	48,019	+1.32%
1995	52,420	+1.66%
2000	57,736	+2.09%
2007	65,705	+1.80%
2010	65,832	+0.07%
2015	71,073	+1.47%
2020	72,752	+0.49%
2024	76,250	+1.13%
Source: Philippine Statistics Authority

== Economy ==
Poverty incidence of Catanauan (%)

Source: Philippine Statistics Authority

One of the major agricultural trades by the populace is copra buying and selling.

== Government ==
=== Elected officials ===
- Mayor: Ramon A. Orfanel
- Vice-Mayor: Manuel B. Montano
- Municipal councilors:
  - Randy De Gala
  - Rogie Casal
  - Rixon Comiso
  - John De Imus
  - Eder Ramos
  - Rudy Pardilla
  - Myla Natividad
  - Tony Avila
  - Gary Averia, PPLB President, Municipal Councilor
  - Gregor Nikole Orfanel, SK President, Municipal Councilor

== Security ==
Catanauan is one of the towns in Bondoc Peninsula where members of the NPA are active. On February 21, 2017, an attempt to set a pay-loader on fire at a batching plant in barangay Cutcutan was thwarted thanks to the immediate response of the local police, the army and firemen. On June 18, 2017, two soldiers were hurt and two generator sets were burned at an encounter with the rebels at a Globe cell site tower in barangay Ajos.

== Culture ==
=== Boling-Boling festival ===
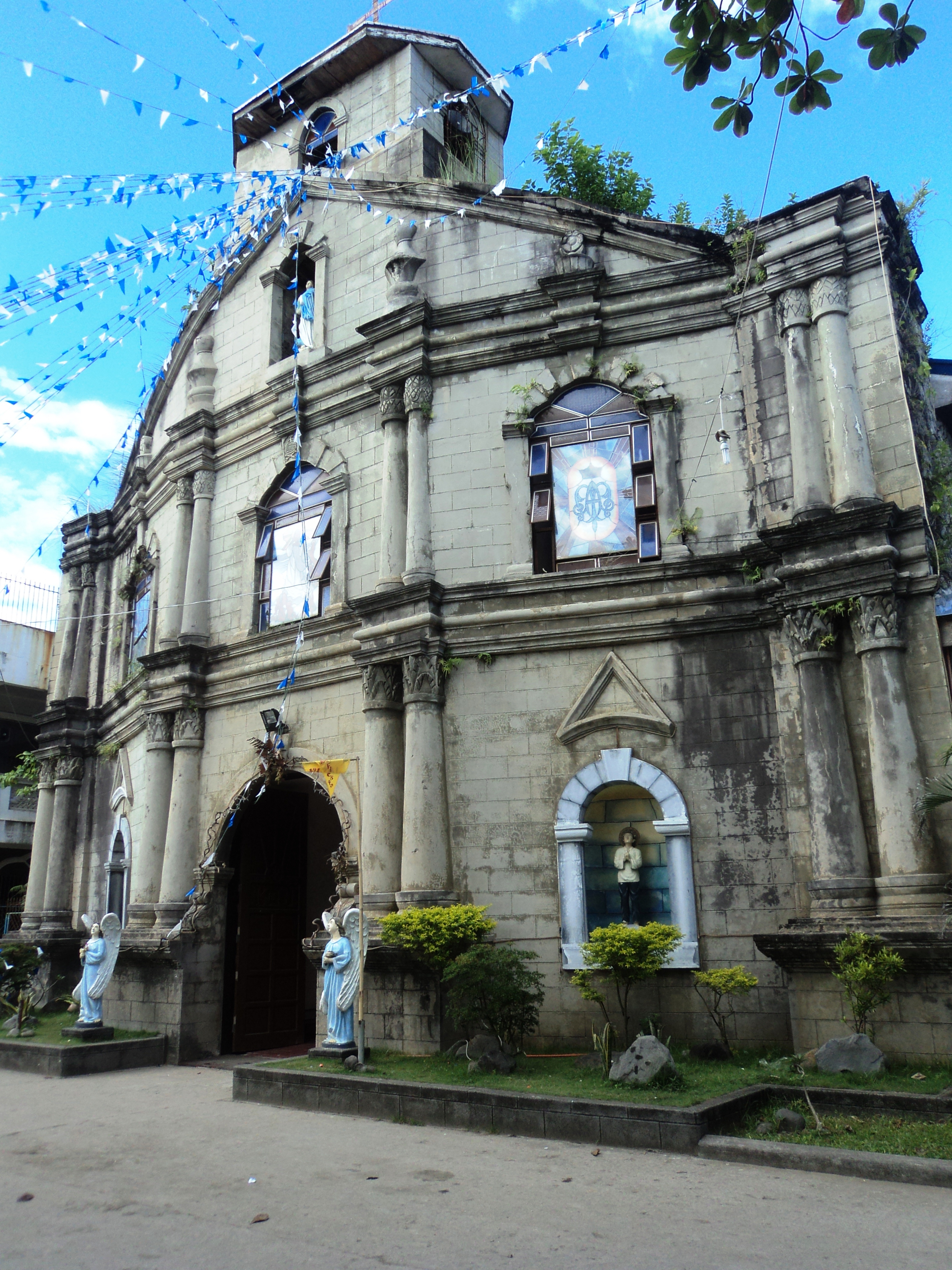
Immaculate Conception Parish Church

"Boling-Boling" is an old age practice particular to Catanauanins, which is celebrated annually starting on the Sunday and ends on Tuesday preceding Ash Wednesday and signals the start of the Lenten Season. Participants roam around the town garbed in any costume they may fancy. Most of them wear colourful clown-like clothes while others imitate anybody whom they despise and make fun of them. It is the Pinoy version of carnival. No one can tell exactly when and how this practice started, not even the oldest resident of this town located at the heart of Bondoc Peninsula. Senior women wearing brightly coloured dresses and hats with flowers sing and dance from one house to another to solicit cash donations, half of which is given to the local Parish Church for its expenses during the Lenten Season activities and the other half for their own group's civic projects. Boling-Boling comes from the Visayan word Boling, which means dirt. This reminds us that we are sinners and that we need to repent, do some spiritual cleansing and get ourselves ready for the Lenten Season. In earlier times, Catanauanins had a grandiose merry-making during the Boling-Boling as, starting the following day, which is Ash Wednesday, they will keep silent suspending all merry-makings until the Black Saturday in reverence to the Lenten Season. Some men skimpily clad in their undergarments put on mud or grease with charcoal all over their bodies and roam around the town trying to scare young women and children for fun.

=== Churches ===
- Nuestra Señora de la Inmaculada Concepción Parish (est. 1835)
- San Isidro Labrador Parish (est. 1962)

== Archaeology ==
The archaeological potential of Catanauan was brought to light in 2006 when Mr. Deo Cuerdo, citizen and cultural advocate of the municipality, reported to the University of the Philippines Archaeological Studies Program (UP-ASP) and the National Museum, cases of accidentally uncovered archaeological materials due to development projects, earthmoving activities, and even illegal diggings. The reported archaeological materials were mostly of jar burials. UP-ASP conducted a preliminary archaeological survey in 2008, and discovered three sites. Since then, there have been a total of 8 excavation seasons in 2008, 2010, 2011, 2012, 2013, 2014, 2015, 2016 and most recently in January 2017.

=== Sites ===
In the Catanauan excavations, there were 4 main sites; Napa site locality 1, Napa site locality 4, Campo site, and Comiso site. Each contain their own distinct artifacts and discoveries.

==== Napa Site Locality 1 ====
Napa Site (Code IV-2008-Q5) was the primary excavation site, containing multiple trenches along with 3 main assemblages; SM1, SM2, and SM3, or “Stone Markers”. This is where most jar burials and tools were found.

==== Napa Site Locality 4 ====
Locality 4 is a second location close to locality 1 with four active trenches containing multiple jar burials in very tight clusters, along with coral markers and lids scattered throughout.

==== Kampo Santo Site ====
This location, initially a 20th-century cemetery, was excavated with the hopes of discovering similar human remains, but unidentified markers were discovered, which purpose has not yet been determined.

==== Comiso Property Sites ====
This survey site was one of the earliest to be excavated and surveyed. Located in Barangay Matandang Sabang Kanluran, this site was heavily stirred up and roiled by quarrying sand. It was later discovered that this was once also another burial site. Its similarities though to other burial sites remain unclear.

=== Jar Burials ===
Catanauan has been known for the numerous jar burials that have been recovered there. Even before the recent excavations in the site, locals have already reported that some jar burials in the site were uncovered through development projects, and that they were able to dig up a series of jar burials with human remains. As the site is very archaeologically rich, the Archaeological Studies Program of the University of the Philippines, Diliman and the Australia National University have been conducting research and excavations in Catanauan through the Catanauan Archaeological and Heritage Project since 2008.

The Napa site in Barangay Tuhian is a very significant place for archaeological research. Most of the jar burials found in Catanauan were recovered from this site. In the 2008 excavation, a lot of jar burials with their human remains were found in Locality 1, Napa site, specifically in trenches 4 and 6. The jars found were mostly earthenware. Different types of coral slabs and rocks served as jar covers. The jars were used for primary and secondary burials. Paz, et al. (2008) inferred that people “went back to uncover the jars, take out the human remains in the jars, and when events dictated, a new body was placed in the old jar”. Some excavated jars were also used for child burials. Aside from human bones, different-colored glass beads, gastropods and fragments of metal were found inside the jars. Boat-shaped burial markers were also found in the site.

In 2010, more jar burials have been recovered as additional trenches were opened. One very distinct jar was the jar found in Trench 13 because of its unique features. It was the only jar from the site which had earthenware as its cover (Paz, et al., 2010). It was oval-shaped and neonate remains were found inside it. Paz, et al. (2010) stated that as of 2010, there are 28 definite jar burials for the Napa site and they are at least a thousand years old.

Comiso Property site is another jar burial site in Catanauan. It is less than 10 km away from the Napa site. Burial jar sherds and fragments of human remains were found on the surface of the site (Paz, et al., 2010). The jar burials were found under shell middens. However, unlike the jars in Napa site, there were no Chinese glass beads found in the Comiso site. This may mean that the Comiso site is older than the Napa site (Paz, et al., 2011).

=== Artifacts ===
Various artifacts have been excavated from Catanauan sites. These artifacts consists of burial jars, Earthenware sherds, skeletal remains, and shell middens.

In 2006, a sand quarry accidentally uncovered at least 5 jar burials containing human skeletal remains in Kanlagkit, Barangay Matandang Sabang Kanluran. At least three sandpits were left partially open, with the backfill containing earthenware sherds and skeletal fragments (mostly long bone).

During the 2008 excavation a shell midden was exposed. The area where local inhabitants dug up burial jars with human remains was abundant in limestone slab fragments, earthenware sherds, and human skeletal fragments. Below the discovered shell midden were a few shells and pottery. Even below that, two small, well fired reddish earthenware pot sherds were found. Some glass beads were also found. A child (neonate) burial was found inside a small earthenware pot 40 cm in diameter, with yellow glass beads buried along with it. Another burial (a female, from studying the pelvic bone) was discovered, and this had sherds from a small pot and a cylindrical artifact.

==== Catanauan Dagger ====
Archaeological digs by the Catanauan Archeological and Heritage Project (CAHP) have unearthed a unique iron dagger with an intricately carved bone hilt found at a jar burial site in the municipality facing Marinduque across the waters of the Mompog Pass. There is evidence that Catanauan's burial practices date back at least 2,000 years, making them part of an ancient Filipino funerary custom that has been found in the eastern part of the central Philippines. Large earthenware jars were buried along the sandy shores and covered with slabs of coralline or volcanic stone to preserve the bodies. Grave woods, either personal belongings or votive offerings for the afterlife, were buried alongside the deceased.

It was found in a burial jar in Napa Site Locality 4 in 2017 during the CAHP's 9th field season, with the bone hilt in two pieces and four iron shards making up the blade. Many bone fragments were discovered under human remains. Another item found in the burial jar was an assortment of colored glass beads. The dagger blade measures 14 centimeters in length, and the finger-fitting hilt grip is composed of bone and organic material, likely wood, with alternating layers. These tiny holes, which might be used to attach accessories and even inlaid with the stated glass beads, make its ornamental, asymmetrical pommel end or hilt end stand out. Some believe that the pommel's design and carved features imply the shape of a boat.

On May 18, 2022, the dagger is now on display at the National Museum of Natural History in Manila, Philippines, as part of the museum's collection of other artifacts.

=== Heritage Work ===
To facilitate several forms of public archaeology and heritage work in the duration of the field season in the Napa site, crew members were oriented to always explain the significance of the archaeological project, at a community level and at larger scale of Philippine culture, to the community members and walk-in groups observing the excavation. The team also held day trips for student coming from different schools like San Isidro National High School - Catanauan, Tayuman National High School, Busdak National High School and ASTI College, mostly coming from near cities and/or provinces. In addition, they updated the tarpaulin signage at the Locality 1 site, Napa site, that explains the study of archaeology and highlights of the findings so far.

The team also actively participated in the fiesta celebrations of Tuhian. As part of the celebration, the team is given a chance to explain to the public community what the project is all about. At the end of the season, the team mounted and left a three-panel exhibit of the results from the first season of excavation (2008). The exhibit explained what archaeology is, the findings and result of the project, and its significance to Philippine history and heritage. They made the exhibit movable so they can move it due to events and gatherings in the barangay.

== Education ==
The Catanauan Schools District Office governs all educational institutions within the municipality. It oversees the management and operations of all private and public, from primary to secondary schools.

=== Primary and elementary schools ===
- Ajos Elementary School
- Anusan Elementary School
- Bolo Elementary School
- Bulagsong Elementary School
- Camandiison Elementary School
- Catanauan Adventist Learning Center
- Catanauan Central School
- Cutcutan Elementary School
- Dahican Elementary School
- Don Abadilla Elementary School
- Doongan Ibaba Elementary School
- Holy Trinity School of Catanauan
- Ireneo L. Comiso Elementary School
- Macpac Elementary School
- Manuel Uy Ek Liong Elementary School
- Milagrosa Elementary School
- Mount Carmel Catholic School
- Navitas Elementary School
- Parochial School of Catanauan
- Peregrino C. Natividad Elementary School
- San Isidro Elementary School
- San Jose Anyao Elementary School
- San Pablo Suha Elementary School
- San Roque Elementary School
- San Vicente Kanluran Elementary School
- San Vicente Silangan Elementary School
- Southern Luzon Academy
- St. Benedicts Playhouse & Educational Center
- Sta. Maria Dao Elementary School
- Tagabas Ibaba Elementary School
- Tagabas Ilaya Elementary School
- Tagbacan Ibaba Elementary School
- Tagbacan Silangan Elementary School
- Tuhian Elementary School

=== Secondary schools ===
- Catanauan National High School
- Doongan Ilaya National High School
- Matandang Sabang National High School
- San Isidro National High School
- San Jose National High School
- San Roque National High School
- San Vicente Kanluran National High School
- Tagbacan National High School
- Tagabas Ibaba National High School

=== Higher educational institutions ===
- Manuel S. Enverga University Foundation
- Philtech Institute of Arts and Technology

== Sources ==
- Paz, et al. (2008) The Catanauan Archaeological and Heritage Project : report on the excavation of Napa site, locality 1 and 2, Catanuan, Bondoc Peninsula, Quezon Province
- Paz, et al. (2008) Preliminary Archaeological Survey on the Municipality of Catanauan, Bondoc Peninsula, Quezon Province
- Paz, et al. (2010) The Catanauan Archaeological and Heritage Project: Report on Excavation and Surveys, Catanauan, Bondoc Peninsula, Quezon Province
- Paz, et al. (2011) The Catanauan Archaeological and Heritage Project: Report on the 3rd Excavation Season, Catanauan, Bondoc Peninsula, Quezon Province
- Paz, et al. (2012) The Catanauan Archaeological and Heritage Project: Report on the 4th Excavation Season, Catanauan, Bondoc Peninsula, Quezon Province
