= Macalelon =

Municipality in Quezon, Philippines

- Municipality
- Municipality of Macalelon

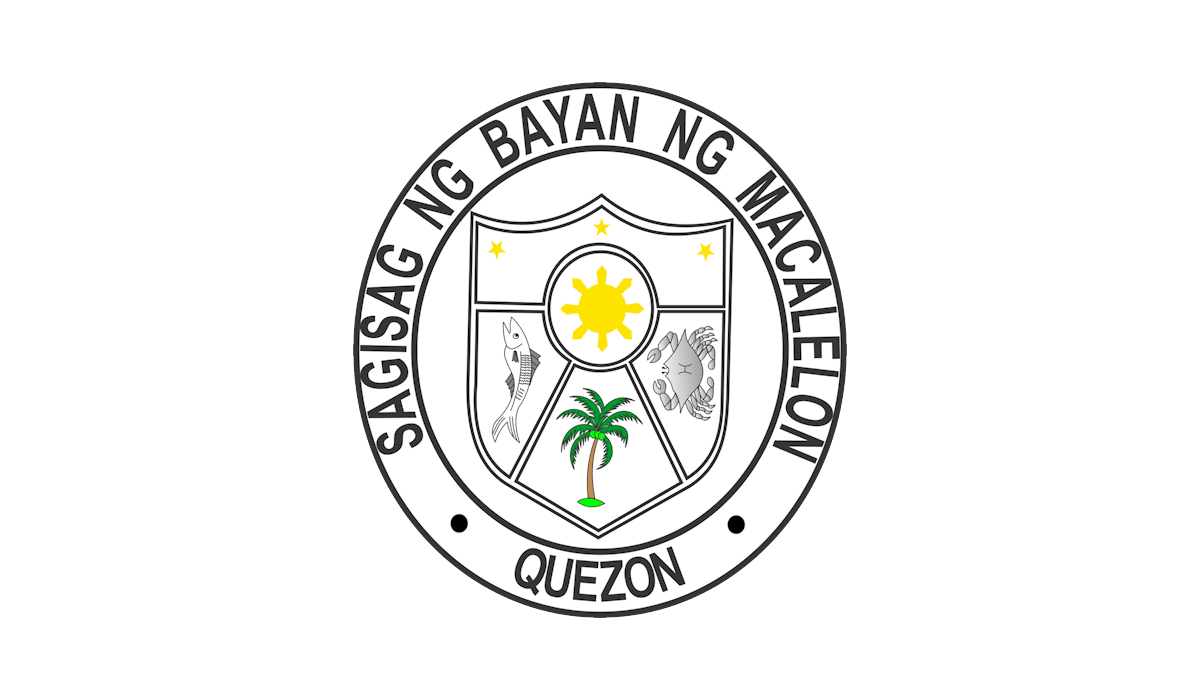
- Flag Seal

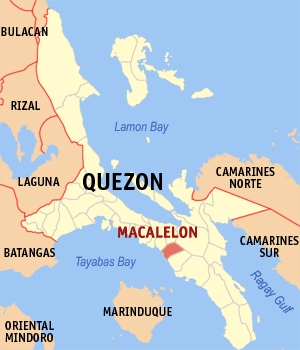
- Map of Quezon with Macalelon highlighted
- Interactive map of Macalelon
- Location within the Philippines
- Coordinates: 13°45′N 122°08′E
- Country: Philippines
- Region: Calabarzon
- Province: Quezon
- District: 3rd district
- Founded: between 1787 and 1793
- Barangays: 30 (see Barangays)

Government
  - Type: Sangguniang Bayan
  - Mayor: Artemio A. Mamburao
  - Vice Mayor: Carmen O. Vidal
  - Representative: Reynante U. Arrogancia
  - Municipal Council: Members: Danilo P. Ilao; Sonny T. Avila; Artemio D. Lorredo Jr.; Donato D. Seño; Armando A. Tan; Marlon D. Moldon; Victor B. Manalo; Epitacio D. Ayangco
  - Electorate: 18,061 voters (2025)

Area
  - Total: 124.05 km^{2} (47.90 sq mi)
- Elevation: 12 m (39 ft)
- Highest elevation: 107 m (351 ft)
- Lowest elevation: 0 m (0 ft)

Population (2024 census)
  - Total: 25,266
  - Density: 203.68/km^{2} (527.52/sq mi)
  - Households: 6,465
- Demonym: Macalelonin

Economy
  - Income class: 3rd municipal income class
  - Poverty incidence: 9.84% (2023)
  - Revenue: ₱ 154.8 million (2024)
  - Assets: ₱ 488.5 million (2024)
  - Expenditure: ₱ 117.1 million (2022)
  - Liabilities: ₱ 86.26 million (2024)

Service provider
  - Electricity: Quezon 1 Electric Cooperative (QUEZELCO 1)
- Time zone: UTC+8 (PST)
- ZIP code: 4309
- PSGC: 0405625000
- IDD : area code: +63 (0)42
- Native languages: Tagalog

Macalelon, officially the Municipality of Macalelon (Tagalog: Bayan ng Macalelon), is a municipality in the province of Quezon, Philippines. According to the 2024 census, it has a population of 25,266 people.

The town is known for its Tikoy Festival (rice cake) and the Kubol Festival.

== History ==
Macalelon began as a barrio in 1696. It became a town between 1787 and 1793.

In 1929, barrio Hingoso was separated from Macalelon to form the new municipality of General Luna.

== Geography ==
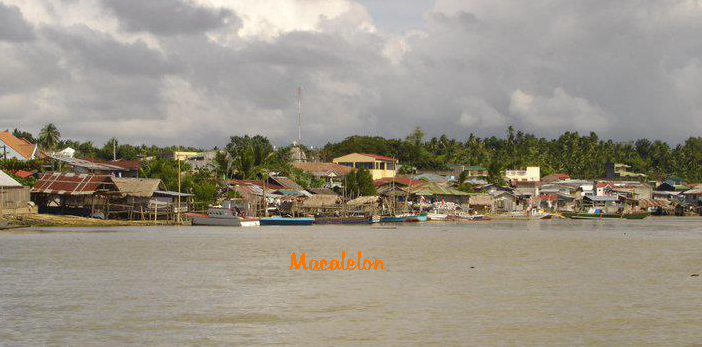
Macalelon Harborfront

Macalelon is 99 kilometers (62 mi) from Lucena and 229 kilometers (142 mi) from Manila.

=== Barangays ===
Macalelon is politically subdivided into 30 barangays, as indicated below. Each barangay consists of puroks and some have sitios.

- Amontay
- Anos
- Buyao
- Candangal
- Calantas
- Lahing
- Luctob/Townsite
- Mabini Ibaba
- Mabini Ilaya
- Malabahay
- Mambog
- Olongtao Ibaba
- Olongtao Ilaya
- Padre Herrera
- Pajarillo
- Pinagbayanan
- Rodriguez (Poblacion)
- Rizal (Poblacion)
- Castillo (Poblacion)
- Pag-Asa (Poblacion)
- Masipag (Poblacion)
- Damayan (Poblacion)
- San Isidro
- San Jose
- San Nicolas
- San Vicente
- Taguin
- Tubigan Ibaba
- Tubigan Ilaya
- Vista Hermosa

=== Climate ===
Climate data for Macalelon, Quezon
Month	Jan	Feb	Mar	Apr	May	Jun	Jul	Aug	Sep	Oct	Nov	Dec	Year
Mean daily maximum °C (°F)	27 (81)	28 (82)	30 (86)	31 (88)	31 (88)	30 (86)	29 (84)	29 (84)	29 (84)	29 (84)	29 (84)	28 (82)	29 (84)
Mean daily minimum °C (°F)	21 (70)	21 (70)	22 (72)	23 (73)	25 (77)	25 (77)	25 (77)	25 (77)	24 (75)	24 (75)	23 (73)	22 (72)	23 (74)
Average precipitation mm (inches)	31 (1.2)	23 (0.9)	25 (1.0)	30 (1.2)	85 (3.3)	145 (5.7)	182 (7.2)	153 (6.0)	172 (6.8)	150 (5.9)	113 (4.4)	68 (2.7)	1,177 (46.3)
Average rainy days	11.3	8.5	9.7	11.3	18.3	23.2	26.6	25.4	25.9	24.2	19.7	15.2	219.3
Source: Meteoblue

Macalelon is geographically vulnerale to instances of flooding. According to a 2017 flood mapping survey by the University of the Philippines Diliman and Mapua Institute of Technology on the Macalelon River, it was revealed that about half of the town's land area could experience floods below 0.20 meters (7.9 in) within five years. Additionally, 7.91% of the area might experience 0.21 to 0.50 meters (8.3 in to 1 ft 7.7 in) of flooding, and 14.9% could experience floods ranging from 0.51 meters (1 ft 8 in) to over 5 meters (16 ft) deep.

== Demographics ==
Population census of Macalelon
Year	Pop.	±% p.a.
1903	4,759	—
1918	6,442	+2.04%
1939	6,587	+0.11%
1948	6,775	+0.31%
1960	10,025	+3.32%
1970	14,787	+3.96%
1975	16,215	+1.87%
1980	17,167	+1.15%
1990	19,887	+1.48%
1995	23,094	+2.84%
2000	22,935	−0.15%
2007	25,986	+1.74%
2010	26,419	+0.60%
2015	28,188	+1.24%
2020	27,312	−0.66%
2024	25,266	−1.85%
Source: Philippine Statistics Authority

== Economy ==
Poverty incidence of Macalelon (%)

Source: Philippine Statistics Authority

From Macalelon's total land area, 75.98 percent of it is dedicated for agricultural use.

== Tourism ==
=== Immaculate Conception Parish Church ===
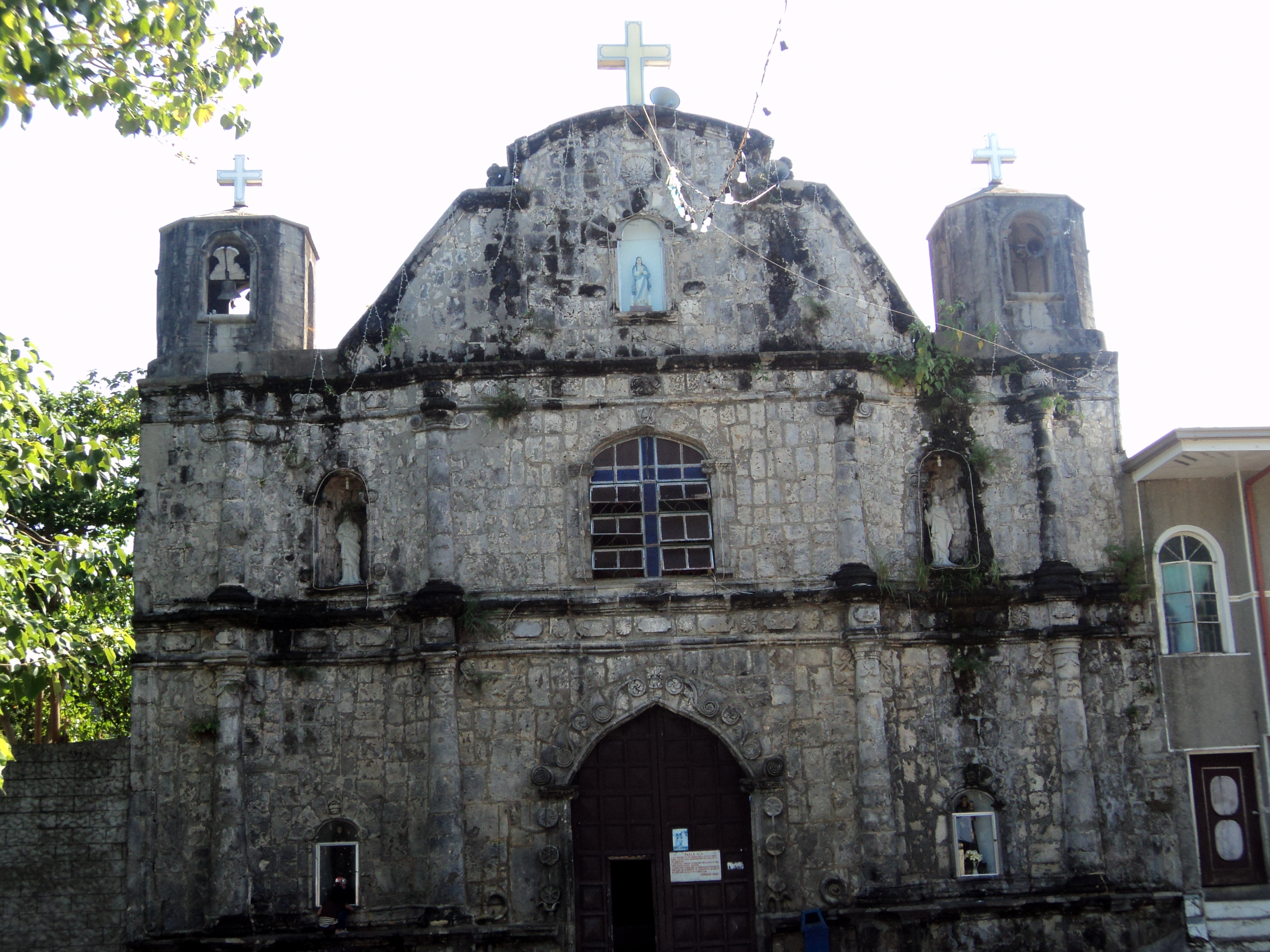
Immaculate Conception Parish Church

Coral stone blocks make up this edifice which was erected in 1854. The convent of the church was built in 1870 and in 1875, the Parish of the Immaculate Concepcion was established.

Flanked by two small belfries, it is situated on top of a small hill.

== Communication ==
Major communication companies that provides internet services are available in the municipality: Globe, Smart and Dito. Voice and data by PLDT and Converge ICT is also available in the area.

== Education ==
The Macalelon Schools District Office governs all educational institutions within the municipality. It oversees the management and operations of all private and public, from primary to secondary schools.

=== Primary and elementary schools ===
- Amontay Elementary School
- Anos Elementary School
- Calantas Elementary School
- Lahing Elementary School
- Mabini Ibaba Elementary School
- Macalelon Central Elementary School
- Macalelon Central Elementary School (Luctob Annex)
- Malabahay Elementary School
- Mambog Elementary School
- Olongtao Ibaba Elementary School
- Olongtao Ilaya Elementary School
- P. Herrera Elementary School
- San Isidro Elementary School
- San Nicolas Elementary School
- San VIcente Elementary School
- Taguin Elementary School
- Tubigan Elementary School
- Vista Hermosa Elementary School

=== Secondary schools ===
- Calantas National High School
- Macalelon High School
- Mary Immaculate Parochial School
- Olongtao National High School
