= Pitogo, Quezon =

Municipality in Quezon, Philippines

Pitogo
- Municipality
- Municipality of Pitogo
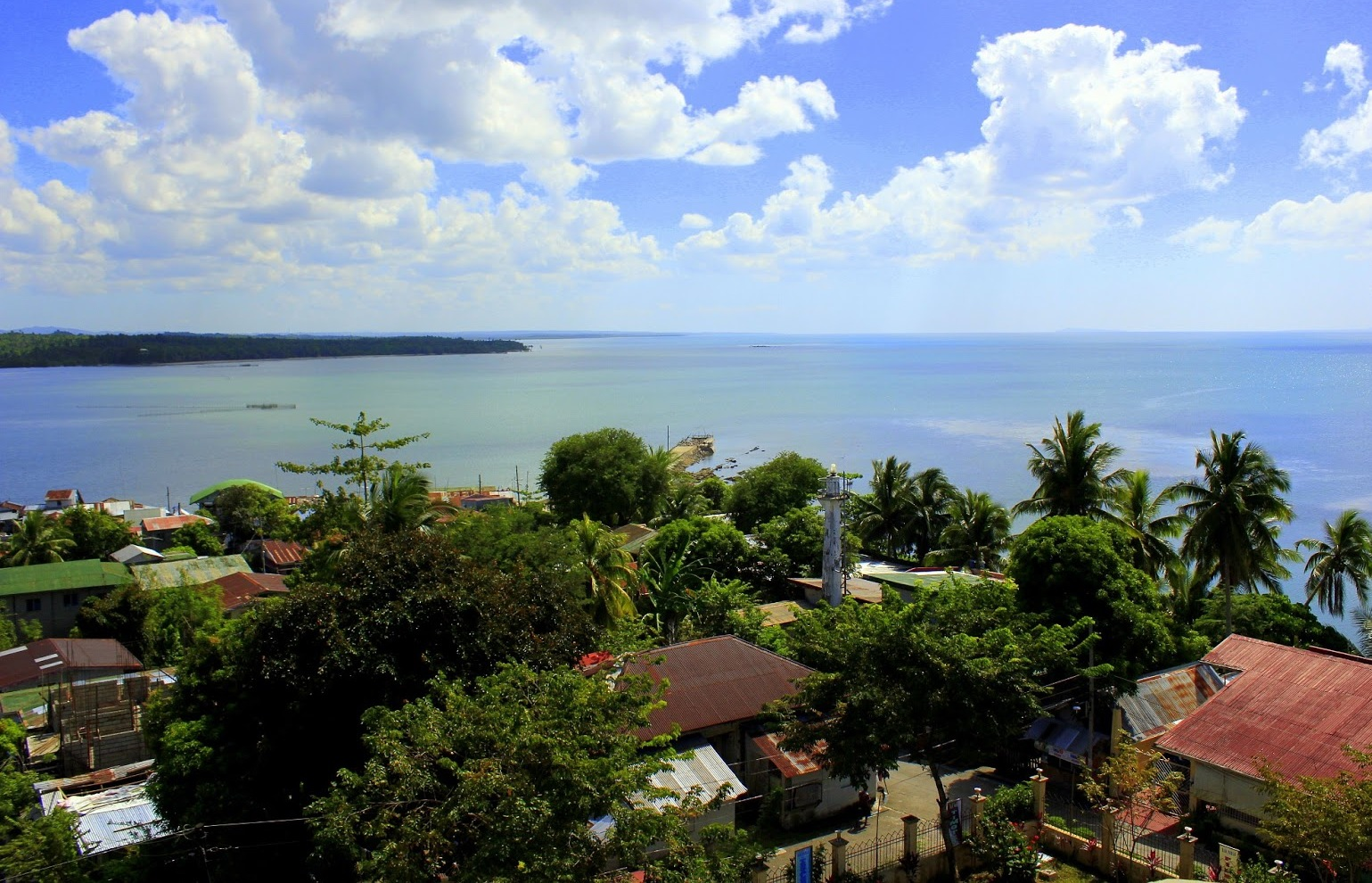
- Downtown area

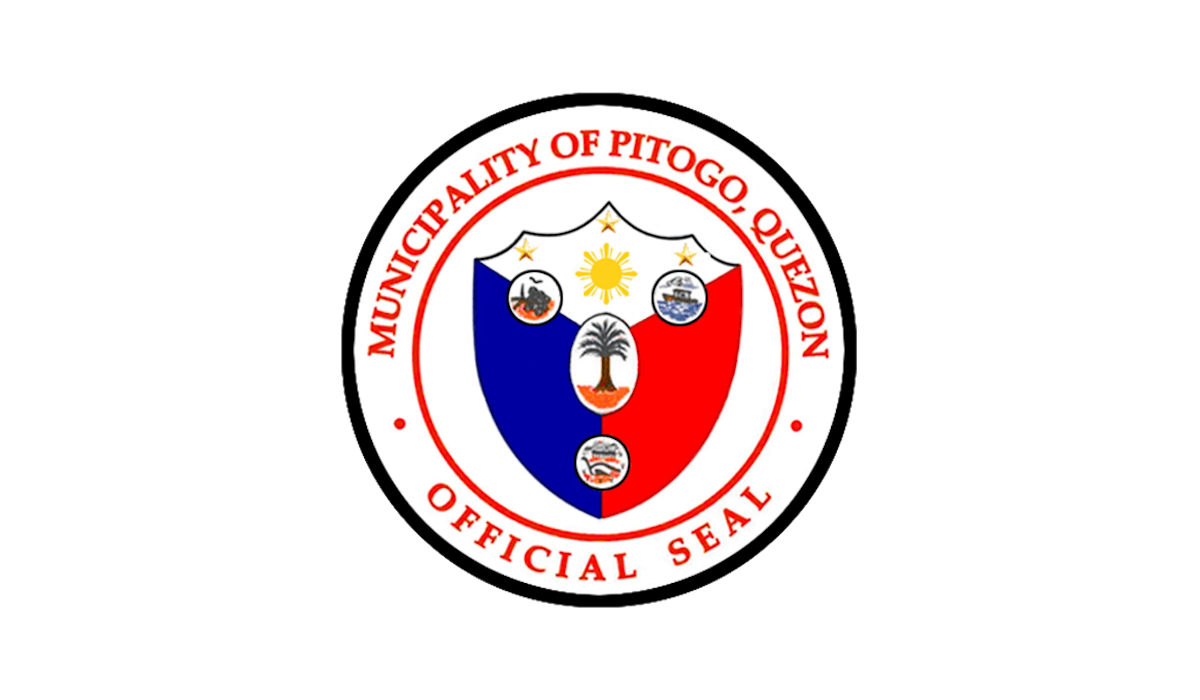
- Flag
- Etymology: Cycas riuminiana
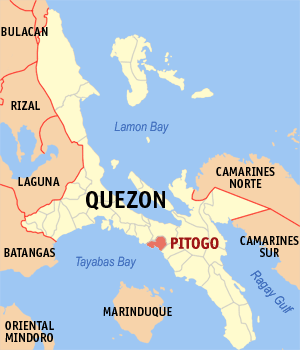
- Map of Quezon with Pitogo highlighted
- Interactive map of Pitogo
- Location within the Philippines
- Coordinates: 13°46′59″N 122°05′17″E
- Country: Philippines
- Region: Calabarzon
- Province: Quezon
- District: 3rd district
- Founded: January 25, 1681
- Barangays: 39 (see Barangays)

Government
  - Type: Sangguniang Bayan
  - Mayor: Dexter L. Sayat
  - Vice Mayor: Paul Timothy C. Villaflor
  - Representative: Reynante U. Arrogancia
  - Municipal Council: Members: Gene I. Llaneta; Benedicta M. Lozada; Ariel A. Enriquez; Esperanza A. Tan; Carlo L. Jaranilla; Rodel P. Forbes; Alexander A. Mosquite; Felipe O. Livado
  - Electorate: 17,112 voters (2025)

Area
  - Total: 73.39 km^{2} (28.34 sq mi)
- Elevation: 13 m (43 ft)
- Highest elevation: 87 m (285 ft)
- Lowest elevation: 0 m (0 ft)

Population (2024 census)
  - Total: 22,499
  - Density: 306.6/km^{2} (794.0/sq mi)
  - Households: 5,599
- Demonym: Pitogohin

Economy
  - Income class: 4th municipal income class
  - Poverty incidence: 9.78% (2023)
  - Revenue: ₱ 128.1 million (2024)
  - Assets: ₱ 318.7 million (2024)
  - Expenditure: ₱ 122.7 million (2024)
  - Liabilities: ₱ 63.29 million (2024)

Service provider
  - Electricity: Quezon 1 Electric Cooperative (QUEZELCO 1)
- Time zone: UTC+8 (PST)
- ZIP code: 4308
- PSGC: 0405634000
- IDD : area code: +63 (0)42
- Native languages: Tagalog

Pitogo, officially the Municipality of Pitogo (Tagalog: Bayan ng Pitogo), is a municipality in the province of Quezon, Philippines. According to the 2024 census, it has a population of 22,499 people.

== Geography ==
Pitogo is 84 kilometers (52 mi) from Lucena and 214 kilometers (133 mi) from Manila.

=== Barangays ===
Pitogo is politically subdivided into 39 barangays, as indicated below. Each barangay consists of puroks and some have sitios.

- Amontay
- Cometa
- Biga
- Bilucao
- Cabulihan
- Cawayanin
- Gangahin
- Ibabang Burgos
- Ibabang Pacatin
- Ibabang Piña
- Ibabang Soliyao
- Ilayang Burgos
- Ilayang Pacatin
- Ilayang Piña
- Ilayang Soliyao
- Nag-Cruz
- Osmeña
- Payte
- Pinagbayanan
- Masaya (Poblacion)
- Manggahan (Poblacion)
- Dulong Bayan (Poblacion)
- Pag-Asa (Poblacion)
- Castillo (Poblacion)
- Maaliw (Poblacion)
- Mayubok (Poblacion)
- Pamilihan (Poblacion)
- Dalampasigan (Poblacion)
- Poctol
- Quezon
- Quinagasan
- Rizalino
- Saguinsinan
- Sampaloc
- San Roque
- Sisirin
- Sumag Este
- Sumag Norte
- Sumag Weste

=== Climate ===
Climate data for Pitogo, Quezon
Month	Jan	Feb	Mar	Apr	May	Jun	Jul	Aug	Sep	Oct	Nov	Dec	Year
Mean daily maximum °C (°F)	27 (81)	28 (82)	30 (86)	31 (88)	31 (88)	30 (86)	29 (84)	29 (84)	29 (84)	29 (84)	29 (84)	28 (82)	29 (84)
Mean daily minimum °C (°F)	21 (70)	21 (70)	22 (72)	23 (73)	25 (77)	25 (77)	25 (77)	25 (77)	24 (75)	24 (75)	23 (73)	22 (72)	23 (74)
Average precipitation mm (inches)	31 (1.2)	23 (0.9)	25 (1.0)	30 (1.2)	85 (3.3)	145 (5.7)	182 (7.2)	153 (6.0)	172 (6.8)	150 (5.9)	113 (4.4)	68 (2.7)	1,177 (46.3)
Average rainy days	11.3	8.5	9.7	11.3	18.3	23.2	26.6	25.4	25.9	24.2	19.7	15.2	219.3
Source: Meteoblue

== Demographics ==
Population census of Pitogo
Year	Pop.	±% p.a.
1903	3,454	—
1918	4,662	+2.02%
1939	6,835	+1.84%
1948	7,668	+1.29%
1960	9,229	+1.56%
1970	12,867	+3.37%
1975	14,840	+2.90%
1980	15,825	+1.29%
1990	17,086	+0.77%
1995	18,832	+1.84%
2000	20,558	+1.90%
2007	21,095	+0.36%
2010	21,380	+0.49%
2015	23,019	+1.42%
2020	22,798	−0.20%
2024	22,499	−0.32%
Source: Philippine Statistics Authority

== Economy ==
Poverty incidence of Pitogo (%)

Source: Philippine Statistics Authority

== Tourism ==
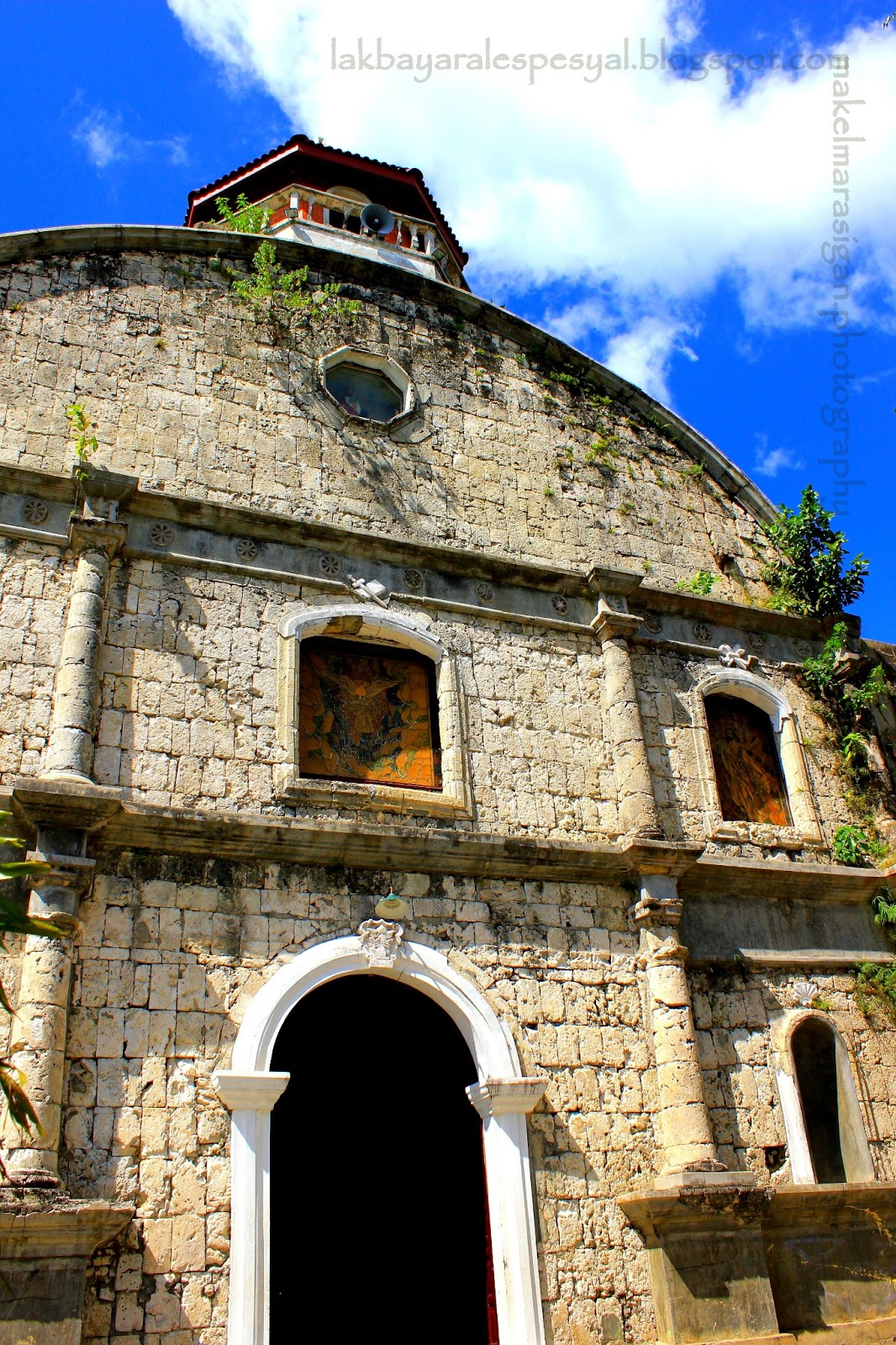
Conversion of Saint Paul Parish Church

- Conversión de San Pablo Parish (est.1850)
- Soliyao Beach
- Puting Buhangin Beach
- Parola
- Villa Rosa Ancestral House
- Taklob Beach
- Pacatin (Tapat-Ibayo) Beach
- Pitogo Wharf

== Education ==
The Pitogo Schools District Office governs all educational institutions within the municipality. It oversees the management and operations of all private and public, from primary to secondary schools.

Primary and elementary schools

- Amontay Elementary School
- Cabulihan Elementary School
- Cawayanin Elementary School
- Dulong Bayan Elementary School
- Gangahin Elementary School
- Pacatin Elementary School
- Piña Elementary School
- Pitogo Central School Bldg. 1
- Pitogo Central School Bldg. 2
- Poctol Elementary School
- Quinagasan Elementary School
- Rizalino Elementary School
- Sampaloc Elementary School
- Soliyao Elementary School
- Sumag Elementary School

Secondary schools

- Amontay National High School
- Cabulihan National High School
- Pitogo Community High School
- Sampaloc National High School
- Western Tayabas High School
