= 2025 Philippine local elections in Calabarzon =

- May 12, 2025
- Gubernatorial elections
- 5 provincial governors and 1 city mayor
Party	Seats	+/–
Stan Q	2	New
AKAY	1	New
Nacionalista	1	+1
NPC	1	−1
NUP	1	0
This lists parties that won seats. See the complete results below.
- Vice gubernatorial elections
- 5 provincial vice governors and 1 city vice mayors
Party	Seats	+/–
Lakas	2	+2
Stan Q	2	New
NPC	1	0
PDP–Laban	1	−2
This lists parties that won seats. See the complete results below.
- Provincial Board elections
- 62 provincial board members and 10 city councilors
Party	Seats	+/–
NUP	16	+2
Stan Q	16	New
Lakas	11	+7
Nacionalista	11	−2
NPC	9	−9
PFP	3	New
KANP	2	New
Aksyon	1	−3
PDP–Laban	1	−10
Independent	1	0
This lists parties that won seats. See the complete results below.

The 2025 Philippine local elections in Calabarzon was held on May 12, 2025.

== Summary ==
=== Governors ===
Province/city	Incumbent	Incumbent's party	Winner	Winner's party	Winning margin
Batangas	Hermilando Mandanas	PDP–Laban	Vilma Santos	Nacionalista	7.87%
Cavite	Athena Tolentino	NUP	Abeng Remulla	NUP	54.78%
Laguna	Ramil Hernandez	Lakas	Sol Aragones	Akay	5.47%
Lucena (HUC)	Mark Alcala	Stand Up Quezon	Mark Alcala	Stand Up Quezon	83.42%
Quezon	Angelina Tan	Stand Up Quezon	Angelina Tan	Stand Up Quezon	Unopposed
Rizal	Nina Ynares	NPC	Nina Ynares	NPC	76.37%

=== Vice governors ===
Province/city	Incumbent	Incumbent's party	Winner	Winner's party	Winning margin
Batangas	Mark Leviste	Independent	Hermilando Mandanas	PDP–Laban	16.93%
Cavite	Shernan Jaro	NUP	Ram Revilla Bautista	Lakas	Unopposed
Laguna	Katherine Agapay	PFP	JM Carait	Lakas	24.42%
Lucena (HUC)	Dondon Alcala	Stand Up Quezon	Dondon Alcala	Stand Up Quezon	76.67%
Quezon	Third Alcala	Stand Up Quezon	Third Alcala	Stand Up Quezon	90.98%
Rizal	Junrey San Juan	PFP	Pining Gatlabayan	NPC	49.52%

=== Provincial boards ===
Province/city	Seats	Party control		Composition
Province/city	Seats	Previous	Result	Composition
Batangas	12 elected 3 ex-officio	Nacionalista	Nacionalista	Nacionalista (10); NPC (1); Independent (1)
Cavite	16 elected 3 ex-officio	NUP	NUP	NUP (10); Lakas (4); NPC (1); Aksyon (1)
Laguna	14 elected 3 ex-officio	No majority	No majority	Lakas (5); NUP (5); PFP (2); NPC (1); KNP (1)
Lucena (HUC)	10 elected 2 ex-officio	No majority	Stand Up Quezon	Stand Up Quezon (7); Lakas (1); KNP (1); Independent (1)
Quezon	10 elected 3 ex-officio	NPC	Stand Up Quezon	Stand Up Quezon (9); Lakas (1)
Rizal	10 elected 4 ex-officio	NPC	No majority	NPC (6); Nacionalista (1); PFP (1); NUP (1); PDP–Laban (1)

== Batangas ==
=== Governor ===
Term-limited incumbent Governor Hermilando Mandanas of the PDP–Laban ran for vice governor of Batangas.

Mandanas endorsed former Padre Garcia mayor Mike Rivera, an independent, who was defeated by former Batangas governor Vilma Santos of the Nacionalista Party. Mataasnakahoy vice mayor Jay Ilagan (PROMDI) and chairman of Barangay Poblacion IV, San Jose Walter Ozaeta (Independent) also ran for governor.

Candidate	Party	Votes	%
Vilma Santos	Nacionalista Party	655,034	42.09
Mike Rivera	Liberal Party	532,531	34.22
Jay Ilagan	PROMDI	272,677	17.52
Walter Ozaeta	Independent	95,946	6.17
Total		1,556,188	100.00
Valid votes		1,556,188	91.67
Invalid/blank votes		141,484	8.33
Total votes		1,697,672	100.00
Registered voters/turnout		1,958,794	86.67
Nacionalista gain from PFP			
Source: Commission on Elections

=== Vice Governor ===
Incumbent Vice Governor Mark Leviste ran for the House of Representatives in Batangas's 3rd legislative district as an independent. He was previously affiliated with PDP–Laban.

Batangas governor Hermilando Mandanas of the PDP–Laban won the election against actor Luis Manzano of the Nacionalista Party, and Bauan mayor Ryanh Dolor, an independent.

Candidate	Party	Votes	%
Hermilando Mandanas	PDP–Laban	821,380	54.27
Luis Manzano	Nacionalista Party	565,077	37.34
Ryanh Dolor	Independent	127,036	8.39
Total		1,513,493	100.00
Valid votes		1,513,493	89.15
Invalid/blank votes		184,179	10.85
Total votes		1,697,672	100.00
Registered voters/turnout		1,958,794	86.67
PDP–Laban gain from Independent			
Source: Commission on Elections

=== Provincial Board ===
The Batangas Provincial Board is composed of 15 board members, 12 of whom are elected.

The Nacionalista Party won 10 seats, maintaining its majority in the provincial board.

Party	Votes	%	Seats	+/–
Nacionalista Party	1,447,263	64.23	10	0
Lakas–CMD	169,747	7.53	0	New
Laban ng Demokratikong Pilipino	127,648	5.66	0	New
Nationalist People's Coalition	126,139	5.60	1	0
Partido Federal ng Pilipinas	110,198	4.89	0	New
PROMDI	58,273	2.59	0	New
Independent	214,032	9.50	1	+1
Total	2,253,300	100.00	12	0
Total votes	1,697,672	–		
Registered voters/turnout	1,958,794	86.67		
Source: Commission on Elections

==== 1st district ====
Batangas' 1st provincial district consists of the same area as Batangas's 1st legislative district. Two board members are elected from this provincial district.

Five candidates were included in the ballot.

Candidate	Party	Votes	%
Anna Coretta Santos	Nacionalista Party	150,934	29.86
Armie Bausas (incumbent)	Nacionalista Party	133,519	26.41
Raymund Apacible	Laban ng Demokratikong Pilipino	127,648	25.25
Leo Malinay	PROMDI	58,273	11.53
Roberto Landicho	Partido Federal ng Pilipinas	35,138	6.95
Total		505,512	100.00
Total votes		370,667	–
Registered voters/turnout		419,735	88.31
Source: Commission on Elections

==== 2nd district ====
Batangas's 2nd provincial district consists of the same area as Batangas's 2nd legislative district. Two board members are elected from this provincial district.

Six candidates were included in the ballot.

Candidate	Party	Votes	%
Reina Abu-Reyes	Nacionalista Party	86,228	29.16
Jently Rivera	Nacionalista Party	72,470	24.51
Richard Dieza	Lakas–CMD	67,328	22.77
Amy Alvarez	Lakas–CMD	60,211	20.36
Ramon Lagrana	Partido Federal ng Pilipinas	6,302	2.13
Andro Hernandez	Independent	3,173	1.07
Total		295,712	100.00
Total votes		179,990	–
Registered voters/turnout		208,306	86.41
Source: Commission on Elections

==== 3rd district ====
Batangas's 3rd provincial district consists of the same area as Batangas's 3rd legislative district. Two board members are elected from this provincial district.

Three candidates were included in the ballot.

Candidate	Party	Votes	%
Fred Corona (incumbent)	Nacionalista Party	223,928	49.09
Rudy Balba (incumbent)	Nacionalista Party	163,464	35.84
Dennis Macalintal	Partido Federal ng Pilipinas	68,758	15.07
Total		456,150	100.00
Total votes		445,505	–
Registered voters/turnout		515,378	86.44
Source: Commission on Elections

==== 4th district ====
Batangas's 4th provincial district consists of the same area as Batangas's 4th legislative district. Two board members are elected from this provincial district.

Five candidates were included in the ballot.

Candidate	Party	Votes	%
Marcus Mendoza	Nationalist People's Coalition	126,139	29.83
Melvin Vidal	Independent	106,257	25.13
Eric de Veyra	Nacionalista Party	92,281	21.82
Kropeck Mercado	Independent	49,949	11.81
Alvin John Samonte	Independent	48,279	11.42
Total		422,905	100.00
Total votes		289,561	–
Registered voters/turnout		329,711	87.82
Source: Commission on Elections

==== 5th district ====
Batangas's 5th provincial district consists of the same area as Batangas's 5th legislative district. Two board members are elected from this provincial district.

Four candidates were included in the ballot.

Candidate	Party	Votes	%
Jun Berberabe	Nacionalista Party	145,778	49.23
Hamilton Blanco	Nacionalista Party	101,753	34.36
Vicente Cantos	Lakas–CMD	42,208	14.25
Ramil Cueto	Independent	6,374	2.15
Total		296,113	100.00
Total votes		192,750	–
Registered voters/turnout		228,263	84.44
Source: Commission on Elections

==== 6th district ====
Batangas's 6th provincial district consists of the same area as Batangas's 6th legislative district. Two board members are elected from this provincial district.

Two candidates were included in the ballot.

Candidate	Party	Votes	%
Bibong Mendoza (incumbent)	Nacionalista Party	146,393	52.87
Jun-jun Gozos	Nacionalista Party	130,515	47.13
Total		276,908	100.00
Total votes		219,199	–
Registered voters/turnout		257,401	85.16
Source: Commission on Elections

== Cavite ==
=== Governor ===
Incumbent Governor Athena Tolentino of the National Unity Party (NUP) retired. She became governor on October 8, 2024, after Jonvic Remulla resigned upon appointment as Secretary of the Interior and Local Government.

The NUP nominated provincial board member Abeng Remulla, who won the election against three other candidates.

Candidate	Party	Votes	%
Abeng Remulla	National Unity Party	1,058,412	73.56
Weng Aguinaldo	Independent	270,207	18.78
Augusto Pera Jr.	Independent	60,713	4.22
GB Ber Ado	Independent	49,419	3.43
Total		1,438,751	100.00
Valid votes		1,438,751	74.79
Invalid/blank votes		485,001	25.21
Total votes		1,923,752	100.00
Registered voters/turnout		2,447,362	78.61
NUP hold			
Source: Commission on Elections

=== Vice Governor ===
Incumbent Vice Governor Shernan Jaro of the National Unity Party ran for the Imus City Council. He became vice governor on October 8, 2024, after Athena Tolentino became governor upon Jonvic Remulla's appointment as Secretary of the Interior and Local Government.

Provincial board member Ram Revilla Bautista of Lakas–CMD won the election unopposed.

Candidate	Party	Votes	%
Ram Revilla Bautista	Lakas–CMD	1,178,445	100.00
Total		1,178,445	100.00
Valid votes		1,178,445	61.26
Invalid/blank votes		745,307	38.74
Total votes		1,923,752	100.00
Registered voters/turnout		2,447,362	78.61
Lakas hold			
Source: Commission on Elections

=== Provincial Board ===
The Cavite Provincial Board is composed of 19 board members, 16 of whom are elected.

The National Unity Party won 10 seats, maintaining its majority in the provincial board.

Party	Votes	%	Seats	+/–
National Unity Party	1,358,972	60.65	10	–1
Lakas–CMD	430,926	19.23	4	+1
Nationalist People's Coalition	132,723	5.92	1	0
Aksyon Demokratiko	119,202	5.32	1	New
United Nationalist Democratic Organization	81,474	3.64	0	New
Partido para sa Demokratikong Reporma	54,560	2.43	0	New
Independent	62,978	2.81	0	0
Total	2,240,835	100.00	16	0
Total votes	1,923,752	–		
Registered voters/turnout	2,447,362	78.61		
Source: Commission on Elections

==== 1st district ====
Cavite's 1st provincial district consists of the same area as Cavite's 1st legislative district. Two board members are elected from this provincial district.

Two candidates were included in the ballot.

Candidate	Party	Votes	%
Romel Enriquez (incumbent)	Lakas–CMD	109,098	52.69
Jygs Gandia	Lakas–CMD	97,945	47.31
Total		207,043	100.00
Total votes		198,617	–
Registered voters/turnout		261,336	76.00
Source: Commission on Elections

==== 2nd district ====
Cavite's 2nd provincial district consists of the same area as Cavite's 2nd legislative district. Two board members are elected from this provincial district.

Two candidates were included in the ballot.

Candidate	Party	Votes	%
Edwin Malvar (incumbent)	Lakas–CMD	122,888	54.89
Alde Pagulayan	Lakas–CMD	100,995	45.11
Total		223,883	100.00
Total votes		227,255	–
Registered voters/turnout		309,462	73.44
Source: Commission on Elections

==== 3rd district ====
Cavite's 3rd provincial district consists of the same area as Cavite's 3rd legislative district. Two board members are elected from this provincial district.

Two candidates were included in the ballot.

Candidate	Party	Votes	%
Ony Cantimbuhan (incumbent)	National Unity Party	112,747	50.06
Lloyd Jaro	National Unity Party	112,485	49.94
Total		225,232	100.00
Total votes		191,949	–
Registered voters/turnout		238,853	80.36
Source: Commission on Elections

==== 4th district ====
Cavite's 4th provincial district consists of the same area as Cavite's 4th legislative district. Two board members are elected from this provincial district.

Four candidates were included in the ballot.

Candidate	Party	Votes	%
Nickol Austria (incumbent)	National Unity Party	191,691	43.18
Jun dela Cuesta (incumbent)	National Unity Party	151,960	34.23
Ely Guimbaolibot	Partido para sa Demokratikong Reporma	54,560	12.29
Niña Trinidad	Independent	45,707	10.30
Total		443,918	100.00
Total votes		351,757	–
Registered voters/turnout		432,844	81.27
Source: Commission on Elections

==== 5th district ====
Cavite's 5th provincial district consists of the same area as Cavite's 5th legislative district. Two board members are elected from this provincial district.

Two candidates were included in the ballot.

Candidate	Party	Votes	%
Aidel Belamide (incumbent)	National Unity Party	139,970	50.10
Ivee Reyes	National Unity Party	139,414	49.90
Total		279,384	100.00
Total votes		261,549	–
Registered voters/turnout		315,944	82.78
Source: Commission on Elections

==== 6th district ====
Cavite's 6th provincial district consists of the same area as Cavite's 6th legislative district. Two board members are elected from this provincial district.

Two candidates were included in the ballot.

Candidate	Party	Votes	%
Kerby Salazar (incumbent)	National Unity Party	97,802	50.86
Morit Sison (incumbent)	National Unity Party	94,493	49.14
Total		192,295	100.00
Total votes		147,825	–
Registered voters/turnout		212,830	69.46
Source: Commission on Elections

==== 7th district ====
Cavite's 7th provincial district consists of the same area as Cavite's 7th legislative district. Two board members are elected from this provincial district.

Four candidates were included in the ballot.

Candidate	Party	Votes	%
Aldrin Anacan	National Unity Party	135,998	38.42
Camille del Rosario	Aksyon Demokratiko	119,202	33.68
Ver Ambion	United Nationalist Democratic Organization	81,474	23.02
Alfredo Sunga	Independent	17,271	4.88
Total		353,945	100.00
Total votes		289,432	–
Registered voters/turnout		363,491	79.63
Source: Commission on Elections

==== 8th district ====
Cavite's 8th provincial district consists of the same area as Cavite's 8th legislative district. Two board members are elected from this provincial district.

Three candidates were included in the ballot.

Candidate	Party	Votes	%
Jasmin Maligaya	Nationalist People's Coalition	132,723	42.12
Aimee Nazareno	National Unity Party	97,793	31.03
Mok Ambion	National Unity Party	84,619	26.85
Total		315,135	100.00
Total votes		255,368	–
Registered voters/turnout		312,602	81.69
Source: Commission on Elections

== Laguna ==
=== Governor ===
Term-limited incumbent Governor Ramil Hernandez of Lakas–CMD ran for the House of Representatives in Laguna's 2nd legislative district. He was previously affiliated with PDP–Laban.

Lakas–CMD nominated Hernandez' wife, representative Ruth Hernandez, who was defeated by former representative Sol Aragones of the Akay National Political Party. Representative Danilo Fernandez (National Unity Party), Laguna vice governor Katherine Agapay (Partido Federal ng Pilipinas) and three other candidates also ran for governor.

Candidate	Party	Votes	%
Sol Aragones	Akay National Political Party	635,570	39.80
Ruth Hernandez	Lakas–CMD	548,286	34.33
Danilo Fernandez	National Unity Party	285,373	17.87
Katherine Agapay	Partido Federal ng Pilipinas	114,758	7.19
Alexander Tolentino	Independent	6,418	0.40
Caloy Reyes	Independent	4,508	0.28
Noli Samia	Independent	2,063	0.13
Total		1,596,976	100.00
Valid votes		1,596,976	93.91
Invalid/blank votes		103,653	6.09
Total votes		1,700,629	100.00
Registered voters/turnout		2,140,124	79.46
Akay gain from Lakas			
Source: Commission on Elections

=== Vice Governor ===
Term-limited incumbent Vice Governor Katherine Agapay of the Partido Federal ng Pilipinas (PFP) ran for governor of Laguna. She was previously affiliated with PDP–Laban.

The PFP nominated Laguna Liga ng mga Barangay president Lorenzo Zuñiga, who was defeated by provincial board member JM Carait of Lakas–CMD. Board member Peewee Perez (Akay National Political Party), actress Gem Castillo (National Unity Party) and two other candidates also ran for vice governor.

Candidate	Party	Votes	%
JM Carait	Lakas–CMD	624,861	42.96
Peewee Perez	Akay National Political Party	269,705	18.54
Jerico Ejercito	Independent	265,760	18.27
Gem Castillo	National Unity Party	224,355	15.42
Lorenzo Zuñiga	Partido Federal ng Pilipinas	52,905	3.64
Mary Buera	Independent	17,002	1.17
Total		1,454,588	100.00
Valid votes		1,454,588	85.53
Invalid/blank votes		246,041	14.47
Total votes		1,700,629	100.00
Registered voters/turnout		2,140,124	79.46
Lakas gain from PFP			
Source: Commission on Elections

=== Provincial Board ===
Since a Supreme Court ruling in 2023 on provincial board representation for component cities having their own legislative districts, the Laguna Provincial Board is composed of 17 board members, 14 of whom are elected.

Lakas–CMD tied with the National Unity Party at five seats each.

Party	Votes	%	Seats	+/–
Lakas–CMD	800,848	32.86	5	+4
National Unity Party	617,841	25.35	5	+4
Partido Federal ng Pilipinas	440,495	18.07	2	New
Akay National Political Party	126,525	5.19	0	New
Nationalist People's Coalition	93,977	3.86	1	New
Nacionalista Party	62,798	2.58	0	–1
Katipunan ng Nagkakaisang Pilipino	57,137	2.34	1	New
Aksyon Demokratiko	22,096	0.91	0	–3
Independent	215,691	8.85	0	0
Total	2,437,408	100.00	14	+4
Total votes	1,700,629	–		
Registered voters/turnout	2,140,124	79.46		
Source: Commission on Elections

==== 1st district ====
Laguna's 1st provincial district consists of the same area as Laguna's 1st legislative district. The cities of Biñan and Santa Rosa used to be under this provincial district until a Supreme Court ruling in 2023 created separate provincial districts for both cities. Two board members are elected from this provincial district.

Five candidates were included in the ballot.

Candidate	Party	Votes	%
Bernadeth Olivares	Katipunan ng Nagkakaisang Pilipino	57,137	25.31
Raffy Campos	National Unity Party	47,300	20.95
Jeamie Salvatierra	Partido Federal ng Pilipinas	42,923	19.01
Lon-lon Ambayec	Akay National Political Party	41,768	18.50
Carlo Almoro	National Unity Party	36,624	16.22
Total		225,752	100.00
Total votes		145,189	–
Registered voters/turnout		188,803	76.90
Source: Commission on Elections

==== 2nd district ====
Laguna's 2nd provincial district consists of the same area as Laguna's 2nd legislative district. The city of Calamba used to be under this provincial district until a Supreme Court ruling in 2023 created a separate provincial district for the city. Three board members are elected from this provincial district.

Five candidates were included in the ballot.

Candidate	Party	Votes	%
Tutti Caringal (incumbent)	National Unity Party	119,677	30.60
Ninoy Bagnes	National Unity Party	107,170	27.40
Irma dela Cruz	Lakas–CMD	85,335	21.82
Christian Aguillo	Akay National Political Party	55,968	14.31
Bim Belarmino	Partido Federal ng Pilipinas	23,005	5.88
Total		391,155	100.00
Total votes		290,509	–
Registered voters/turnout		350,865	82.80
Source: Commission on Elections

==== 3rd district ====
Laguna's 3rd provincial district consists of the same area as Laguna's 3rd legislative district. Two board members are elected from this provincial district.

Six candidates were included in the ballot.

Candidate	Party	Votes	%
Karla Monica Adajar (incumbent)	Lakas–CMD	157,294	36.80
Angelica Jones	Partido Federal ng Pilipinas	127,701	29.87
Charles Caratihan	Lakas–CMD	122,114	28.57
Elma Reyes	Independent	7,745	1.81
Icel Flores	Independent	7,165	1.68
Juanita Venzuela	Independent	5,456	1.28
Total		427,475	100.00
Total votes		314,502	–
Registered voters/turnout		372,861	84.35
Source: Commission on Elections

==== 4th district ====
Laguna's 4th provincial district consists of the same area as Laguna's 4th legislative district. Two board members are elected from this provincial district.

Seven candidates were included in the ballot.

Candidate	Party	Votes	%
Jam Agarao	Partido Federal ng Pilipinas	184,487	40.26
Rai-Ann San Luis	National Unity Party	109,737	23.94
Kenneth Ragaza	National Unity Party	52,621	11.48
Rommel Palacol	Lakas–CMD	39,865	8.70
Maria Guadalupe Ejercito	Independent	33,280	7.26
Archee Lopez	Lakas–CMD	20,182	4.40
Eli Gojas	Independent	18,122	3.95
Total		458,294	100.00
Total votes		324,990	–
Registered voters/turnout		403,696	80.50
Source: Commission on Elections

==== Biñan ====
Following a Supreme Court ruling in 2023, a provincial district was created for the city of Biñan, which used to be under the 1st provincial district. Two board members are elected from this provincial district.

Eight candidates were included in the ballot.

Candidate	Party	Votes	%
Bong Bejasa (incumbent)	Lakas–CMD	57,414	21.40
Jigcy Pecaña	Lakas–CMD	52,661	19.63
Jay Souza	National Unity Party	43,750	16.31
Alvin Garcia	National Unity Party	37,216	13.87
Gab Alatiit	Partido Federal ng Pilipinas	34,988	13.04
Theresa Yatco Paron	Akay National Political Party	28,789	10.73
Joselito Asiño Jr.	Independent	10,965	4.09
Izel Sordilla	Independent	2,526	0.94
Total		268,309	100.00
Total votes		172,110	–
Registered voters/turnout		227,474	75.66
Source: Commission on Elections

==== Calamba ====
Following a Supreme Court ruling in 2023, a provincial district was created for the city of Calamba, which used to be under the 2nd provincial district. Two board members are elected from this provincial district.

11 candidates were included in the ballot.

Candidate	Party	Votes	%
Princess Lajara	Lakas–CMD	116,721	27.99
Dyan Espiridon	Lakas–CMD	115,282	27.65
Ronald Cardema	Nacionalista Party	62,798	15.06
Cyren Catindig	Independent	49,764	11.93
Vinz Hizon	Aksyon Demokratiko	22,096	5.30
Lino Sarmiento	Partido Federal ng Pilipinas	21,131	5.07
Sheren Manaig	Independent	18,412	4.42
Emong Larroza	National Unity Party	5,449	1.31
Jong Ibañez	Independent	2,318	0.56
Noel Rivera	Independent	2,194	0.53
Voltage Demiar	Independent	821	0.20
Total		416,986	100.00
Total votes		267,227	–
Registered voters/turnout		364,766	73.26
Source: Commission on Elections

==== Santa Rosa ====
Following a Supreme Court ruling in 2023, a provincial district was created for the city of Santa Rosa, which used to be under the 1st provincial district. Two board members are elected from this provincial district.

Five candidates were included in the ballot.

Candidate	Party	Votes	%
Arnel Gomez	Nationalist People's Coalition	93,977	37.68
Peping Cartaño	National Unity Party	58,297	23.37
Eric Puzon	Independent	56,923	22.82
Renz Mayano	Lakas–CMD	33,980	13.62
John Masaredo	Partido Federal ng Pilipinas	6,260	2.51
Total		249,437	100.00
Total votes		186,102	–
Registered voters/turnout		231,659	80.33
Source: Commission on Elections

== Lucena ==
=== Mayor ===
Incumbent Mayor Mark Alcala of Stand Up Quezon ran for a second term. He was previously affiliated with PDP–Laban.

Alcala won re-election against two other candidates.

Candidate	Party	Votes	%
Mark Alcala (incumbent)	Stand Up Quezon	136,006	90.27
Efren Cruzat	Partido Maharlika	10,320	6.85
Benjamin Padiernos Jr.	Independent	4,336	2.88
Total		150,662	100.00
Valid votes		150,662	88.58
Invalid/blank votes		19,426	11.42
Total votes		170,088	100.00
Registered voters/turnout		199,416	85.29
Stan Q hold			
Source: Commission on Elections

=== Vice Mayor ===
Incumbent Vice Mayor Dondon Alcala of Stand Up Quezon ran for a second term. He was previously affiliated with PDP–Laban.

Alcala won re-election against two other candidates.

Candidate	Party	Votes	%
Dondon Alcala (incumbent)	Stand Up Quezon	129,578	87.10
Boyet Alejandrino	Independent	15,510	10.43
Marbien de Juan Sr.	Partido Maharlika	3,687	2.48
Total		148,775	100.00
Valid votes		148,775	87.47
Invalid/blank votes		21,313	12.53
Total votes		170,088	100.00
Registered voters/turnout		199,416	85.29
Stan Q hold			
Source: Commission on Elections

=== City Council ===
The Lucena City Council is composed of 12 councilors, 10 of whom are elected.

24 candidates were included in the ballot.

Stand Up Quezon won seven seats, gaining a majority in the city council.

Party	Votes	%	Seats	+/–
Stand Up Quezon	707,054	59.99	7	New
Lakas–CMD	161,804	13.73	1	New
Katipunan ng Nagkakaisang Pilipino	72,511	6.15	1	New
People's Reform Party	55,175	4.68	0	New
Nacionalista Party	43,241	3.67	0	New
Partido Maharlika	14,440	1.23	0	New
Independent	124,336	10.55	1	0
Total	1,178,561	100.00	10	0
Total votes	170,088	–		
Registered voters/turnout	199,416	85.29		
Source: Commission on Elections

Candidate	Party	Votes	%
Danny Faller (incumbent)	Stand Up Quezon	91,550	7.77
Amer Lacerna (incumbent)	Stand Up Quezon	85,201	7.23
Wilbert Mckinly Noche (incumbent)	Stand Up Quezon	83,493	7.08
Patrick Nadera (incumbent)	Stand Up Quezon	83,386	7.07
Baste Brizuela (incumbent)	Stand Up Quezon	79,248	6.72
Jose Christian Ona (incumbent)	Stand Up Quezon	78,875	6.69
Beth Sio (incumbent)	Stand Up Quezon	75,284	6.39
Ayan Alcala (incumbent)	Independent	75,145	6.38
Sunshine Abcede	Katipunan ng Nagkakaisang Pilipino	72,511	6.15
Edwin Pureza (incumbent)	Lakas–CMD	72,060	6.11
Niñel Pedro	Stand Up Quezon	67,956	5.77
Wilfredo Baldonado	Stand Up Quezon	62,061	5.27
Lon Talaga	People's Reform Party	55,175	4.68
Jha Jha Buñag	Lakas–CMD	46,870	3.98
Bong-Bong Talabong	Nacionalista Party	43,241	3.67
Tinton Suarez	Lakas–CMD	42,964	3.65
Jun Buenaflor	Independent	19,705	1.67
Danilo Gonzales	Partido Maharlika	9,550	0.81
Val Dudas	Independent	6,652	0.56
Teny Montecalbo	Independent	6,567	0.56
Maria Veronica Garcia	Independent	6,291	0.53
Sonia Paraiso	Independent	5,364	0.46
Jhun Meera	Partido Maharlika	4,890	0.41
Apiong Endiape	Independent	4,612	0.39
Total		1,178,651	100.00
Total votes		170,088	–
Registered voters/turnout		199,416	85.29
Source: Commission on Elections

== Quezon ==
=== Governor ===
Incumbent Governor Angelina Tan of Stand Up Quezon won re-election for a second term unopposed. She was previously affiliated with the Nationalist People's Coalition.

Candidate	Party	Votes	%
Angelina Tan (incumbent)	Stand Up Quezon	1,011,465	100.00
Total		1,011,465	100.00
Valid votes		1,011,465	80.77
Invalid/blank votes		240,740	19.23
Total votes		1,252,205	100.00
Registered voters/turnout		1,496,156	83.69
Stan Q hold			
Source: Commission on Elections

=== Vice Governor ===
Incumbent Vice Governor Third Alcala of Stand Up Quezon ran for a second term. He was previously affiliated with the Nationalist People's Coalition.

Alcala won re-election against two other candidates.

Candidate	Party	Votes	%
Third Alcala (incumbent)	Stand Up Quezon	851,518	94.16
Teodorico Capina	Independent	28,759	3.18
Armingol Alpajora	Kilusang Bagong Lipunan	24,065	2.66
Total		904,342	100.00
Valid votes		904,342	72.22
Invalid/blank votes		347,863	27.78
Total votes		1,252,205	100.00
Registered voters/turnout		1,496,156	83.69
Stan Q hold			
Source: Commission on Elections

=== Provincial Board ===
The Quezon Provincial Board is composed of 13 board members, 10 of whom are elected.

Stand Up Quezon won nine seats, gaining a majority in the provincial board.

Party	Votes	%	Seats	+/–
Stand Up Quezon	1,243,337	75.79	9	New
Lakas–CMD	98,638	6.01	1	+1
Nationalist People's Coalition	88,837	5.41	0	–7
Partido Federal ng Pilipinas	80,233	4.89	0	New
Aksyon Demokratiko	76,500	4.66	0	0
Kilusang Bagong Lipunan	6,113	0.37	0	New
Independent	46,940	2.86	0	0
Total	1,640,598	100.00	10	0
Total votes	1,252,205	–		
Registered voters/turnout	1,496,156	83.69		
Source: Commission on Elections

==== 1st district ====
Quezon's 1st provincial district consists of the same area as Quezon's 1st legislative district. Two board members are elected from this provincial district.

Six candidates were included in the ballot.

Candidate	Party	Votes	%
Julius Luces (incumbent)	Stand Up Quezon	128,536	29.64
Sam Nantes	Lakas–CMD	98,638	22.74
Elmo Sarona	Nationalist People's Coalition	88,837	20.48
Alona Obispo	Partido Federal ng Pilipinas	75,357	17.38
Christian Paul Alcala	Independent	36,195	8.35
Nathalie Garcia	Kilusang Bagong Lipunan	6,113	1.41
Total		433,676	100.00
Total votes		317,255	–
Registered voters/turnout		377,065	84.14
Source: Commission on Elections

==== 2nd district ====
Quezon's 2nd provincial district consists of the same area as Quezon's 2nd legislative district. Three board members are elected from this provincial district.

Three candidates were included in the ballot.

Candidate	Party	Votes	%
Kim Tan	Stand Up Quezon	253,568	45.88
Vinnette Alcala (incumbent)	Stand Up Quezon	169,113	30.60
Yna Liwanag (incumbent)	Stand Up Quezon	129,967	23.52
Total		552,648	100.00
Total votes		444,858	–
Registered voters/turnout		516,199	86.18
Source: Commission on Elections

==== 3rd district ====
Quezon's 3rd provincial district consists of the same area as Quezon's 3rd legislative district. Two board members are elected from this provincial district.

Five candidates were included in the ballot.

Candidate	Party	Votes	%
Meg Esguerra	Stand Up Quezon	131,634	38.17
JJ Aquivido (incumbent)	Stand Up Quezon	121,088	35.11
Tintin Reyes	Aksyon Demokratiko	76,500	22.18
Bieto Gonzales	Independent	10,745	3.12
Conrado Diaz	Partido Federal ng Pilipinas	4,876	1.41
Total		344,843	100.00
Total votes		253,457	–
Registered voters/turnout		304,144	83.33
Source: Commission on Elections

==== 4th district ====
Quezon's 4th provincial district consists of the same area as Quezon's 4th legislative district. Three board members are elected from this provincial district.

Three candidates were included in the ballot.

Candidate	Party	Votes	%
Rachel Ubana	Stand Up Quezon	117,552	37.99
Harold Butardo (incumbent)	Stand Up Quezon	112,414	36.33
Ola Eduarte	Stand Up Quezon	79,465	25.68
Total		309,431	100.00
Total votes		236,635	–
Registered voters/turnout		298,748	79.21
Source: Commission on Elections

== Rizal ==
=== Governor ===
Incumbent Governor Nina Ynares of the Nationalist People's Coalition ran for a second term.

Ynares won re-election against three other candidates.

Candidate	Party	Votes	%
Nina Ynares (incumbent)	Nationalist People's Coalition	884,132	83.48
Jose Velasco	Independent	75,331	7.11
Ronald Perez	Independent	55,214	5.21
Glenn Acol	Independent	44,386	4.19
Total		1,059,063	100.00
Valid votes		1,059,063	83.03
Invalid/blank votes		216,389	16.97
Total votes		1,275,452	100.00
Registered voters/turnout		1,671,643	76.30
NPC hold			
Source: Commission on Elections

=== Vice Governor ===
Term-limited incumbent Vice Governor Junrey San Juan of Partido Federal ng Pilipinas ran for the Rizal Provincial Board in the 2nd provincial district.

Antipolo vice mayor Pining Gatlabayan of the Nationalist People's Coalition won the election against four other candidates.

Candidate	Party	Votes	%
Pining Gatlabayan	Nationalist People's Coalition	600,553	64.00
Jojo Bautista	Independent	135,917	14.48
Reynaldo Manuel	Independent	84,388	8.99
Imee Badajos	Partido Demokratiko Sosyalista ng Pilipinas	83,603	8.91
Cherry Guillergan	Independent	33,970	3.62
Total		938,431	100.00
Valid votes		938,431	73.58
Invalid/blank votes		337,021	26.42
Total votes		1,275,452	100.00
Registered voters/turnout		1,671,643	76.30
NPC hold			
Source: Commission on Elections

=== Provincial Board ===
The Rizal Provincial Board is composed of 14 board members, 10 of whom are elected.

The Nationalist People's Coalition remained as the largest party in the provincial board with six seats, but lost its majority.

Party	Votes	%	Seats	+/–
Nationalist People's Coalition	937,585	53.04	6	–2
Nacionalista Party	142,671	8.07	1	New
Partido Federal ng Pilipinas	120,180	6.80	1	New
National Unity Party	104,810	5.93	1	0
PDP–Laban	44,974	2.54	1	0
Independent	417,324	23.61	0	0
Total	1,767,544	100.00	10	0
Total votes	1,275,452	–		
Registered voters/turnout	1,671,643	76.30		
Source: Commission on Elections

==== 1st district ====
Rizal's 1st provincial district consists of the same area as Rizal's 1st legislative district. Four board members are elected from this provincial district.

Nine candidates were included in the ballot.

Candidate	Party	Votes	%
Jestoni Alarcon	Nationalist People's Coalition	248,389	23.77
Papoo Cruz	Nationalist People's Coalition	183,628	17.57
Kay Ilagan-Conde	Nationalist People's Coalition	179,113	17.14
Patnubay Tiamson	Nacionalista Party	142,671	13.65
Edwin Cruz	Independent	100,147	9.58
Louie dela Rosa	Independent	86,571	8.28
Jakz Mamba	Independent	37,525	3.59
Boy Agpalo	Independent	36,092	3.45
Joseph Huang	Independent	30,883	2.96
Total		1,045,019	100.00
Total votes		423,100	–
Registered voters/turnout		555,121	76.22
Source: Commission on Elections

==== 2nd district ====
Rizal's 2nd provincial district consists of the same area as Rizal's 2nd legislative district. Two board members are elected from this provincial district.

Four candidates were included in the ballot.

Candidate	Party	Votes	%
Boboy Bernados (incumbent)	Nationalist People's Coalition	105,350	41.48
Junrey San Juan	Partido Federal ng Pilipinas	99,598	39.22
Arturo Gimenez	Independent	29,786	11.73
Evan Daryll Aguelo	Independent	19,222	7.57
Total		253,956	100.00
Total votes		239,574	–
Registered voters/turnout		306,943	78.05
Source: Commission on Elections

==== 3rd district ====
Rizal's 3rd provincial district consists of the same area as Rizal's 3rd legislative district. One board member is elected from this provincial district.

Five candidates were included in the ballot.

Candidate	Party	Votes	%
John Patrick Bautista (incumbent)	PDP–Laban	44,974	50.61
Philip Lustre	Partido Federal ng Pilipinas	20,582	23.16
Jancat Cataluña	Independent	14,836	16.69
Ariel Gutierrez	Independent	4,421	4.97
Abet Enriquez	Independent	4,058	4.57
Total		88,871	100.00
Total votes		107,147	–
Registered voters/turnout		134,335	79.76
Source: Commission on Elections

==== 4th district ====
Rizal's 4th provincial district consists of the same area as Rizal's 4th legislative district. One board member is elected from this provincial district.

Four candidates were included in the ballot.

Candidate	Party	Votes	%
Rafhael Ayuson	Nationalist People's Coalition	102,159	74.48
Benjamin Pascual	Independent	18,592	13.55
Oliver Santos	Independent	8,549	6.23
Lot Pascua	Independent	7,863	5.73
Total		137,163	100.00
Total votes		173,858	–
Registered voters/turnout		219,447	79.23
Source: Commission on Elections

==== Antipolo's 1st district ====
Antipolo's 1st provincial district consists of the same area as Antipolo's 1st legislative district. One board member is elected from this provincial district.

One candidate was included in the ballot.

Candidate	Party	Votes	%
Nick Puno	National Unity Party	104,810	100.00
Total		104,810	100.00
Total votes		155,352	–
Registered voters/turnout		212,925	72.96
Source: Commission on Elections

==== Antipolo's 2nd district ====
Antipolo's 2nd provincial district consists of the same area as Antipolo's 2nd legislative district. One board member is elected from this provincial district.

Two candidates were included in the ballot.

Candidate	Party	Votes	%
Nilo Leyble (incumbent)	Nationalist People's Coalition	118,946	86.36
Emmanuel Yator	Independent	18,779	13.64
Total		137,725	100.00
Total votes		176,421	–
Registered voters/turnout		242,872	72.64
Source: Commission on Elections
