= Southern Luzon Multi-Specialty Medical Center =

Future government hospital in Quezon, Philippines

- Department of Health

Geography
- Location: Tayabas, Quezon, Calabarzon, Philippines

History
- Constructed: 2022–present
- Founded: April 16, 2022

The Southern Luzon Multi-Specialty Medical Center is a government hospital under-construction in Tayabas, Quezon in the Philippines.

== History ==
The Republic Act No. 11702, the legal basis for the Southern Luzon Multi-Specialty Medical Center in Tayabas, Quezon, was signed into law by President Rodrigo Duterte in April 16, 2022. Quezon's 4th district representative Angelina Tan was the principal author of the House of Representatives bill. The hospital is meant to serve the Bicol, Calabarzon, Mimaropa regions.

The groundbreaking ceremony for the whole hospital complex was held in May 2022. The Medical Arts Building broke ground on March 5, 2024.

Construction for the hospital has cost ₱480 million according to budget allocated from 2022 to 2025. As of February 2026, the hospital's steel frame is yet to be finished. Angelina Tan, now governor of Quezon, attributes this to the deficiencies in the budget.
