= Quezon's 4th congressional district =

Legislative district of the Philippines

- Constituency for the House of Representatives of the Philippines
- Boundary of Quezon's 4th congressional district in Quezon

- Location of Quezon within the Philippines
- Province: Quezon
- Region: Calabarzon
- Population: 456,568 (2015)
- Electorate: 273,864 (2019)
- Major settlements: 10 Municipalities: Alabat; Atimonan; Calauag; Guinayangan; Gumaca; Lopez; Perez; Plaridel; Quezon, Quezon; Tagkawayan
- Area: 2,079.21 km^{2} (802.79 sq mi)

Current constituency
- Created: 1987
- Representative: Keith Micah Tan
- Created from: Quezon-2
- Political party: NPC; Stan Q
- Congressional bloc: Majority

Quezon's 4th congressional district is one of the four congressional districts of the Philippines in the province of Quezon, formerly Tayabas. It has been represented in the House of Representatives of the Philippines since 1987. The district consists of municipalities in the Tayabas Isthmus and Alabat Island, namely Alabat, Atimonan, Calauag, Guinayangan, Gumaca, Lopez, Perez, Plaridel, Quezon and Tagkawayan. It is currently represented in the 20th Congress by Keith Micah Tan of the Nationalist People's Coalition (NPC) and Stand Up Quezon (Stan Q).

== Election results from provincial races ==
Year	Office/Plebiscite	Results
2008	2008 Partition of Quezon	Yes ✘51,322 – 56.83%
2010	Governor	Jayjay Suarez ✔
2010	President	Aquino ✔
2013	Governor	Jayjay Suarez ✔
2016	Governor	Jayjay Suarez ✔
2016	President	Poe ✘
2019	Governor	Danny Suarez ✔
2022	Governor	Tan ✔70.7 – 29.3%
2022	President	Robredo ✘ 609,973
2025	Governor	Tan ✔ (Uncontested election)

== Representation history ==
#	Image	Member	Term of office		Legislature	Party	Electoral history	Constituency
#	Image	Member	Start	End	Legislature	Party	Electoral history	Constituency
District created February 2, 1987 from the four-seat Quezon's at-large district for the Regular Batasang Pambansa and prior to 1972, represented by Quezon's 2nd congressional district.
1		Oscar F. Santos	June 30, 1987	June 30, 1992	8th	UNIDO	Elected in 1987.	1987–present Alabat, Atimonan, Calauag, Guinayangan, Gumaca, Lopez, Perez, Plaridel, Quezon, Tagkawayan
2		Manolet O. Lavides	June 30, 1992	June 30, 1995	9th	LDP	Elected in 1992.	1987–present Alabat, Atimonan, Calauag, Guinayangan, Gumaca, Lopez, Perez, Plaridel, Quezon, Tagkawayan
2		Manolet O. Lavides	June 30, 1992	June 30, 1995	9th	Lakas	Elected in 1992.	1987–present Alabat, Atimonan, Calauag, Guinayangan, Gumaca, Lopez, Perez, Plaridel, Quezon, Tagkawayan
3		Wigberto E. Tañada	June 30, 1995	June 30, 2001	10th	Liberal	Elected in 1995.	1987–present Alabat, Atimonan, Calauag, Guinayangan, Gumaca, Lopez, Perez, Plaridel, Quezon, Tagkawayan
3		Wigberto E. Tañada	June 30, 1995	June 30, 2001	11th	Liberal	Re-elected in 1998.	1987–present Alabat, Atimonan, Calauag, Guinayangan, Gumaca, Lopez, Perez, Plaridel, Quezon, Tagkawayan
4		Georgilu R. Yumul-Hermida	June 30, 2001	June 30, 2004	12th	PMP	Elected in 2001.	1987–present Alabat, Atimonan, Calauag, Guinayangan, Gumaca, Lopez, Perez, Plaridel, Quezon, Tagkawayan
5		Lorenzo "Erin" R. Tañada III	June 30, 2004	June 30, 2013	13th	Liberal	Elected in 2004.	1987–present Alabat, Atimonan, Calauag, Guinayangan, Gumaca, Lopez, Perez, Plaridel, Quezon, Tagkawayan
5		Lorenzo "Erin" R. Tañada III	June 30, 2004	June 30, 2013	14th	Liberal	Re-elected in 2007.	1987–present Alabat, Atimonan, Calauag, Guinayangan, Gumaca, Lopez, Perez, Plaridel, Quezon, Tagkawayan
5		Lorenzo "Erin" R. Tañada III	June 30, 2004	June 30, 2013	15th	Liberal	Re-elected in 2010.	1987–present Alabat, Atimonan, Calauag, Guinayangan, Gumaca, Lopez, Perez, Plaridel, Quezon, Tagkawayan
6		Angelina "Helen" D.L. Tan	June 30, 2013	June 30, 2022	16th	UNA	Elected in 2013.	1987–present Alabat, Atimonan, Calauag, Guinayangan, Gumaca, Lopez, Perez, Plaridel, Quezon, Tagkawayan
6		Angelina "Helen" D.L. Tan	June 30, 2013	June 30, 2022	17th	NPC	Re-elected in 2016.	1987–present Alabat, Atimonan, Calauag, Guinayangan, Gumaca, Lopez, Perez, Plaridel, Quezon, Tagkawayan
6		Angelina "Helen" D.L. Tan	June 30, 2013	June 30, 2022	18th	NPC	Re-elected in 2019.	1987–present Alabat, Atimonan, Calauag, Guinayangan, Gumaca, Lopez, Perez, Plaridel, Quezon, Tagkawayan
7		Keith Michael D.L. Tan	June 30, 2022	Incumbent	19th	NPC (Stan Q)	Elected in 2022.	1987–present Alabat, Atimonan, Calauag, Guinayangan, Gumaca, Lopez, Perez, Plaridel, Quezon, Tagkawayan
7		Keith Michael D.L. Tan	June 30, 2022	Incumbent	20th	NPC (Stan Q)	Re-elected in 2025.	1987–present Alabat, Atimonan, Calauag, Guinayangan, Gumaca, Lopez, Perez, Plaridel, Quezon, Tagkawayan

== Election results ==
=== 2025 ===
2025 Philippine House of Representatives election at Quezon's 4th district
Party	Candidate	Votes	%
NPC	Keith Micah Tan	199,930	100
Rejected ballots		36,705	11.57
Turnout		317,255	79.21
Registered electors		298,748	
NPC hold			
Source: Commission on Elections

=== 2022 ===
2022 Philippine House of Representatives elections
Party	Candidate	Votes	%
NPC	Keith Micah Tan	166,591	72.89
Lakas	Rhodora Tan	43,862	19.19
NUP	Fernando Martinez	12,193	5.34
WPP	Rhodora Legaspi	2,705	1.18
Independent	Florenio Tierra	2,191	0.96
PRP	Resty Martinez	1,003	0.44
Total votes		228,545	100.00
NPC hold			

=== 2019 ===
2019 Philippine House of Representatives elections
Party	Candidate	Votes	%
NPC	Angelina Tan	178,766	100.00
Valid ballots		178,766	65.28
Invalid or blank votes		95,098	34.72
Total votes		273,864	100.00
NPC hold			

=== 2016 ===
2016 Philippine House of Representatives elections
Party	Candidate	Votes	%
NPC	Angelina Tan	129,772	70.20
Liberal	Lorenzo Tañada III	53,265	28.80
Independent	Armando Mendoza	1,562	0.80
Independent	Marcil Guay	194	0.10
Total votes		184,793	100.00
NPC hold			

=== 2013 ===
2013 Philippine House of Representatives elections
Party	Candidate	Votes	%
UNA	Angelina Tan	53,403	44.07
Liberal	Wigberto Tañada, Jr.	53,041	43.77
LM	Alvin John Tañada	4,735	3.91
Total votes		121,175	100.00
UNA gain from Liberal			

=== 2010 ===
2010 Philippine House of Representatives elections
Party	Candidate	Votes	%
Liberal	Lorenzo Tañada III	148,226	100.00
Valid ballots		148,226	84.88
Invalid or blank votes		26,398	15.12
Total votes		174,624	100.00
Liberal hold			

=== 2007 ===
2007 Philippine House of Representatives elections
Party	Candidate	Votes	%
Liberal	Lorenzo Tañada III	94,967	70.82
Lakas	Narciso Malite	31,306	23.35
NPC	Vicente Rabaya	7,814	5.83
Total votes		134,087	100.00
Liberal hold			

=== 2004 ===
2004 Philippine House of Representatives elections
Party	Candidate	Votes	%
Liberal	Lorenzo Tañada III	94,813	73.96
PDSP	Efren Villaseñor	21,974	17.14
Lakas	Vicente Rabaya Jr.	10,162	7.93
LDP	Robert Yap–Diangco	1,249	0.97
Total votes		128,198	100.00
Liberal gain from PMP			

== See also ==
- Legislative districts of Quezon
