= Erin Tañada =

Filipino lawyer, politician, and broadcaster

Lorenzo Tañada III
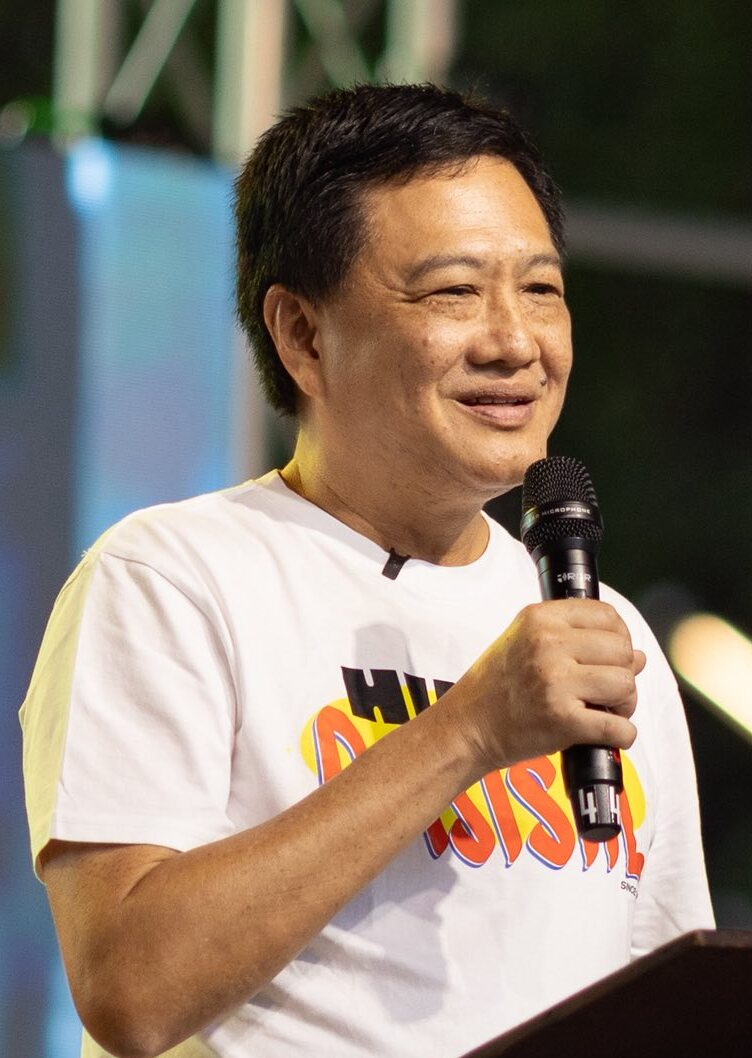
- Tañada in 2026

Deputy Speaker of the House of Representatives of the Philippines
- In office July 26, 2010 – June 30, 2013
- Preceded by: Amelita Villarosa
- Succeeded by: Roberto Puno

Member of the Philippine House of Representatives from Quezon's 4th congressional district
- In office June 30, 2004 – June 30, 2013
- Preceded by: Georgilu Yumul-Hermida
- Succeeded by: Angelina Tan

18th President of the Liberal Party
- Incumbent
- Assumed office January 30, 2025 (Note: Served as acting party president from January 30, 2025, to January 24, 2026, before being officially elected as its party president.)
- Preceded by: Edcel Lagman

Personal details
- Born: Lorenzo Reyes Tañada III; August 16, 1963 (age 63) Manila, Philippines
- Party: Liberal (2003–present); ML (party-list; 2024–present)
- Spouses: Ria Nuñez; Julie B. Tañada
- Relations: Lorenzo Tañada Sr. (grandfather)
- Children: 2
- Parent(s): Wigberto Tañada; Azucena Reyes
- Education: Ateneo de Manila University (BA); Manuel L. Quezon University (LL.B)
- Occupation: Politician
- Profession: Lawyer
- Website: www.erintanada.com

Lorenzo "Erin" Reyes Tañada III (Tagalog: [tɐˈɲada], born August 16, 1963) is a Filipino lawyer, politician, broadcaster, and human rights and labor rights advocate who has served as a Deputy Speaker of the Philippine House of Representatives. A member of the Liberal Party, he was first elected to the House of Representatives in 2004, as the representative of Quezon province's 4th district.

He is particularly known for being the author of "Anti-Torture Act of 2009" (Republic Act No. 9749), the "Philippine Act on Crimes Against International Humanitarian Law, Genocide, and Other Crimes Against Humanity" (Republic Act No. 9851), and the "Renewable Energy Act of 2008" (RA 9513) as well as for his strong advocacy of the Freedom of Information Bill.

He formerly served as the manager for news and public affairs of UNTV-37 and host for several programs of the said station.

== Early life and career ==
Erin Tañada is a grandson of the late Senator Lorenzo M. Tañada and the eldest child of former Senator Wigberto E. Tañada, the Senator who led the fight to rid the country of the U.S. military bases in Clark and Subic. He is the eldest of the four children of Wigberto and Nanay Zeny, along with younger siblings Toby, Marites and Trina.

His exposure to public service brought him to the parliament of the streets during the latter part of the Martial Law years. Tañada was a college student at Ateneo de Manila University where he actively updated his fellow students on political developments. When former Senator Benigno Aquino, Jr. was assassinated in 1983, he joined the university's Task Force Ninoy, a group supporting the advocacies of Ninoy Aquino. He finished his legal studies at the Manuel L. Quezon University - School of Law, and with a never give up attitude, passed the Philippine Bar Examination on his third try. He would later practice law at the Tañada, Vivo and Tan law office.

== Political career ==
Tañada started his political career by winning the seat of the fourth district of Quezon Province in the House of Representatives in 2004. He was the Assistant Majority Leader of the 13th Congress, the Chairman of the House of Representatives' Committee on Human Rights of the 14th Congress, and the Deputy Speaker of the 15th Congress. He was re-elected unopposed for his third term as Congressman. While he eyed the Speakership of the 15th Congress, he gave way to Quezon City representative Feliciano Sonny Belmonte.

He was at the forefront of the second high government official to ever be impeached, Philippine Ombudsman Merceditas Gutierrez, for betrayal of the public trust. The House of Representatives successfully impeached Gutierrez in March 2011, with him being one of the representatives that defended the impeachment on the floor, and among the 212 representatives that voted to impeach her.

He was a spokesperson of the prosecution during the impeachment of the late Chief Justice Renato Corona.

As Congressman for three consecutive terms, his advocacies include having -

- opposed the increase of the Value-Added Tax to 12%
- recommended that legislators give up their pork barrel to cover the national budget deficit
- called for the creation of a Congressional commission for the audit of the public debt and the repeal of the law on automatic appropriations for debt servicing
- worked for the passage into law of the Magna Carta for Micro, Small and Medium Enterprises which mandated that banks allocate a portion of their loan portfolios to these enterprises
- co-authored the law creating the Personal Equity and Retirement Account (PERA)
- co-authored the Agri-Agra Reform Credit Act which mandated that banks set aside 25% of their loan portfolios for the agriculture and fisheries sector
- authored the bill creating the Coconut Farmer's Trust Fund, which makes use of the recovered coconut levy which was misappropriated by Marcos and his cronies
- authored the first Universal Health Care law and inserted amendments to the Cheaper Medicines Act
- authored the bill which led to the passage of the Graphic Health Warnings law on cigarette packs
- funded a program for the continuing education of school teachers, in partnership with the Philippine Normal University
- funded scholarship programs for students
- led a campaign for the passage of a Freedom of Information law
- pushed for the abolition of the death penalty
- shepherded into law the Human Rights Victims Reparation and Compensation Act, for the benefit of the victims of Marcos' human rights violations

Tañada ran during the May 13, 2019 senatorial election as part of the Otso Diretso slate, the entire slate however lost amid a contentious race that culminated in a 7-hour freeze of the transmission of the counting of votes.

On July 19, 2019, the PNP–Criminal Investigation and Detection Group (CIDG) filed charges against members of the Otso Diretso opposition for "sedition, cyber libel, libel, estafa, harboring a criminal, and obstruction of justice". On February 10, 2020, they were cleared of all charges.

For the 2022 General Elections, Former Deputy Speaker Erin Tañada served as the campaign manager of the Team Robredo-Pangilinan (TRoPa) Senatorial Slate which produced three winning candidates, he is quoted during the campaign with the statement, "“Kahit ano pa ang kulay mo, kung ikaw ay para sa pag-usad ng ating bansa sa ilalim ng isang gobyernong tapat, welcome ka!”

== Electoral history ==
Electoral history of Erin Tañada
| Year | Office | Party | Votes received | | | | Result |
| Year | Office | Party | Total | % | P. | Swing | Result |
|---|---|---|---|---|---|---|---|
| 2004 | Representative (Quezon–4th) | Liberal | 94,813 | 73.96% | 1st | —N/a | Won |
| 2007 | Representative (Quezon–4th) | Liberal | 94,967 | 70.82% | 1st | -3.14 | Won |
| 2010 | Representative (Quezon–4th) | Liberal | 148,226 | 100.00% | 1st | +29.18 | Unopposed |
| 2016 | Representative (Quezon–4th) | Liberal | 53,265 | 28.80% | 2nd | -71.2 | Lost |
| 2019 | Senator of the Philippines | Liberal | 3,870,529 | 8.18% | 27th | —N/a | Lost |
| 2025 | Representative (Party-list) | ML | 547,949 | 1.31% | 14th | —N/a | Lost (as third nominee) |

== Notes ==
House of Representatives of the Philippines
| Preceded by Georgilu Yumul-Hermida | Member of the House of Representatives from Quezon's 4th district 2004–2013 | Succeeded by Angelina Tan |
Party political offices
| Preceded by Edcel Lagman | President of the Liberal Party; 2026–present | Incumbent |
