= 2022 Quezon local elections =

Philippine election

2022 Quezon gubernatorial election
- May 9, 2022
- Gubernatorial elections
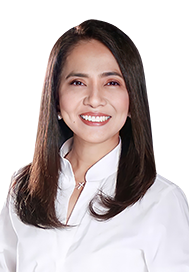

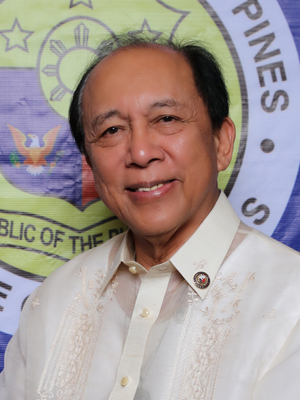
Nominee	Angelina Tan	Danilo Suarez
Party	NPC	Lakas
Running mate	Anacleto Alcala III	Betty Nantes
Popular vote	790,534	320,296
Percentage	68.89	27.91
- Results per municipality and city
Governor before election
Danilo Suarez
Lakas
Elected Governor
Angelina Tan
NPC
- Vice gubernatorial elections
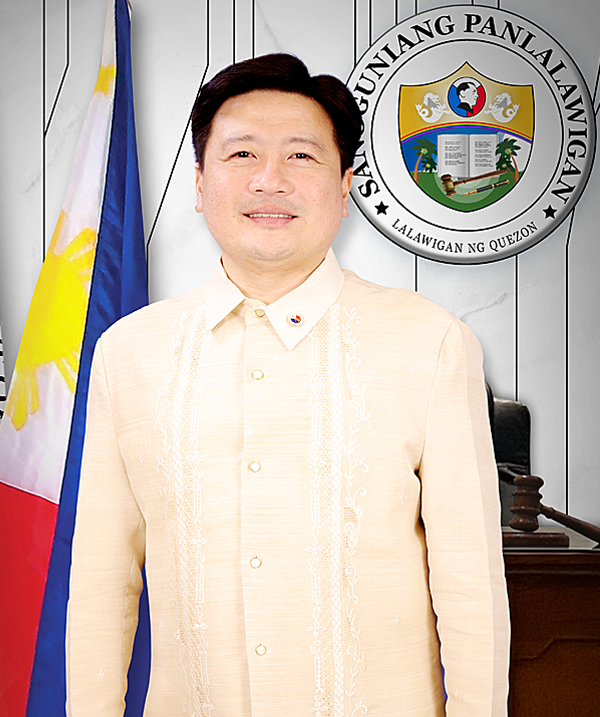
		Lakas
Nominee	Anacleto Alcala III	Betty Nantes
Party	NPC	Lakas
Popular vote	665,442	283,530
Percentage	63.25	26.95
Vice Governor before election
Samuel B. Nantes
Aksyon
Elected Vice Governor
Anacleto Alcala III
NPC

Local elections were held in the Province of Quezon on May 9, 2022, as part of the 2022 general election. Voters will select candidates for all local positions: a town mayor, vice mayor and town councilors, as well as members of the Sangguniang Panlalawigan, the vice-governor, governor and representatives for the four districts of Quezon.

== Provincial elections ==
=== Gubernatorial election ===
Parties are as stated in their certificate of candidacies.

Incumbent Governor Danilo Suarez is running for reelection. His opponent is Incumbent 4th district representative Angelina "Helen" Tan. Helen tan wins with 790, 739 over 320,395 votes for Danny Suarez to become the first female governor.

Quezon gubernatorial election
Party	Candidate	Votes	%
NPC	Angelina "Helen" Tan	790,534	68.89
Lakas	Danilo "Danny" Suarez	320,296	27.91
KBL	Angelita Tan	13,119	1.14
Independent	Jeson Tan	8,523	0.74
PRP	Sonny Suarez	7,287	0.64
Independent	Romeo Suarez	4,162	0.36
Independent	Warren Sio	3,532	0.31
Total votes		1,147,453	100.00
NPC gain from Lakas			

==== Per City/Municipality ====
City/Municipality	Angelina Tan		Danilo Suarez		Angelita Tan		Jeson Tan		Sonny Suarez		Romeo Suarez		Warren Sio	
City/Municipality	Votes	%	Votes	%	Votes	%	Votes	%	Votes	%	Votes	%	Votes	%
Agdangan	5,007	64.20	2,707	34.71	29	0.37	24	0.31	18	0.23	8	0.10	6	0.08
Alabat	7,349	78.26	1,646	17.53	289	3.08	41	0.44	35	0.37	27	0.29	4	0.04
Atimonan	23,623	76.93	6,165	20.08	510	1.66	110	0.36	138	0.45	116	0.38	47	0.15
Buenavista	12,640	78.92	3,028	18.91	150	0.94	87	0.54	66	0.41	25	0.16	20	0.12
Burdeos	6,591	62.95	3,461	33.05	101	0.96	124	1.18	121	1.16	53	0.51	20	0.19
Calauag	28,795	76.78	7,339	19.57	743	1.98	214	0.57	205	0.55	159	0.42	49	0.13
Candelaria	44,562	65.45	21,086	30.97	496	0.73	635	0.93	457	0.67	279	0.41	567	0.83
Catanauan	23,007	63.89	12,306	34.17	279	0.77	155	0.43	143	0.40	98	0.27	24	0.07
Dolores	12,019	69.09	4,747	27.29	183	1.05	155	0.89	148	0.85	45	0.26	98	0.56
General Luna	7,710	54.19	6,295	44.24	67	0.47	53	0.37	56	0.39	32	0.22	15	0.11
General Nakar	13,141	67.49	5,503	28.26	206	1.06	259	1.33	191	0.98	132	0.68	38	0.20
Guinayangan	18,921	83.39	3,161	13.93	387	1.71	84	0.37	66	0.29	53	0.23	18	0.08
Gumaca	27,858	75.49	7,809	21.16	846	2.29	150	0.41	133	0.33	82	0.22	37	0.10
Infanta	23,084	61.64	13,004	34.72	278	0.74	425	1.13	358	0.96	204	0.54	97	0.26
Jomalig	2,691	68.77	1,007	25.73	67	1.71	51	1.30	65	1.66	27	0.69	5	0.13
Lopez	38,307	78.30	8,797	17.98	1,138	2.33	231	0.47	244	0.50	159	0.32	49	0.10
Lucban	18,614	65.90	8,562	30.31	267	0.95	245	0.87	221	0.78	142	0.50	194	0.69
Lucena	102,277	–	47,115	–	1,497	–	1,037	–	912	–	461	–	689	–
Macalelon	10,334	73.43	3,519	25.00	90	0.64	33	0.23	56	0.40	26	0.18	16	0.11
Mauban	22,515	61.91	12,751	35.06	287	0.79	328	0.90	311	0.86	133	0.37	43	0.12
Mulanay	19,893	70.40	7,724	27.34	212	0.75	157	0.56	164	0.58	80	0.28	26	0.09
Padre Burgos	9,017	69.74	3,715	28.73	58	0.45	56	0.43	51	0.39	23	0.18	10	0.08
Pagbilao	27,839	73.25	8,747	23.01	466	1.23	415	1.09	206	0.54	148	0.39	186	0.49
Panukulan	5,537	62.78	2,836	32.16	104	1.18	130	1.47	141	1.60	61	0.69	10	0.11
Patnanungan	5,882	86.67	686	10.11	58	0.85	82	1.21	44	0.65	23	0.34	12	0.18
Perez	6,215	81.66	1,073	14.10	197	2.59	42	0.55	43	0.56	25	0.33	16	0.21
Pitogo	10,324	73.37	3,431	24.38	148	1.05	81	0.58	52	0.37	23	0.16	13	0.09
Plaridel	5,632	77.43	1,380	18.97	153	210	24	0.33	48	0.66	30	0.41	7	0.10
Polillo	9,661	58.82	6,124	37.29	154	0.94	206	1.25	165	1.00	100	0.61	14	0.09
Quezon	7,230	78.72	1,599	17.41	235	2.56	38	0.41	43	0.47	34	0.37	6	0.07
Real	12,059	63.95	6,059	32.13	167	0.89	277	1.47	172	0.91	87	0.46	37	0.20
Sampaloc	5,218	64.60	2,584	31.99	73	0.90	77	0.95	91	1.13	25	0.31	9	0.11
San Andres	8,753	60.67	5,334	36.97	83	0.58	78	0.54	104	0.72	60	0.42	15	0.10
San Antonio	14,454	70.07	5,530	26.81	156	0.76	181	0.88	107	0.52	79	0.38	121	0.59
San Francisco	16,710	56.44	12,247	41.37	134	0.45	109	0.37	222	0.75	162	0.55	22	0.07
San Narciso	16,848	73.02	5,849	25.35	120	0.52	90	0.39	94	0.41	54	0.23	19	0.08
Sariaya	52,411	65.08	25,699	31.91	649	0.81	613	0.76	519	0.64	263	0.33	382	0.47
Tagkawayan	19,908	71.55	6,510	23.40	834	3.00	189	0.68	215	0.77	138	0.50	28	0.10
Tayabas	41,070	74.11	12,604	22.74	507	0.91	488	0.88	340	0.61	208	0.38	198	0.36
Tiaong	38,727	70.32	13,928	25.29	637	1.16	693	1.26	486	0.88	254	0.46	351	0.64
Unisan	8,101	54.24	6,629	44.39	64	0.43	56	0.37	47	0.31	26	0.17	12	0.08
TOTAL	790,534	68.89	320,296	27.91	13,119	1.14	8,523	0.74	7,287	0.64	4,162	0.36	3,532	0.31

=== Vice Gubernatorial election ===
Parties are as stated in their certificate of candidacies.

Incumbent Samuel Nantes is term-limited and is running for Mayor of Tayabas. His mother, former Philippine Charity Sweepstakes Office board member Betty Nantes, is his party's nominee. Anacleto Alcalla III wins the election with 665,570 votes over Betty Nantes who only garnered 283, 588.

Quezon vice gubernatorial election
Party	Candidate	Votes	%
NPC	Anacleto Alcala III	665,442	63.25
Lakas	Betty Nantes	283,530	26.95
KBL	Alona Villamayor-Obispo	91,906	8.74
Independent	Perlita Lavides	7,398	0.70
Independent	Teodorico Capina	3,816	0.36
Total votes		1,052,092	100.00
NPC gain from Aksyon			

==== Per City/Municipality ====
City/Municipality	Anacleto Alcala III		Betty Nantes		Alona Villamayor-Obispo		Perlita Lavides		Teodorico Capina	
City/Municipality	Votes	%	Votes	%	Votes	%	Votes	%	Votes	%
Agdangan	4,597	64.31	2,197	30.74	294	4.11	39	0.55	21	0.29
Alabat	5,772	68.40	2,096	24.84	507	6.01	44	0.52	20	0.24
Atimonan	18,203	65.49	7,676	27.62	1,389	5.00	440	1.58	87	0.31
Buenavista	10,757	74.72	2,654	18.44	815	5.66	97	0.67	73	0.51
Burdeos	4,552	50.04	2,776	30.52	1,665	18.30	67	0.74	36	0.40
Calauag	22,107	66.78	7,978	24.10	2,581	7.80	303	0.92	137	0.41
Candelaria	42,092	66.59	17,001	26.90	3,561	5.63	311	0.49	245	0.39
Catanauan	18,242	57.84	11,218	35.57	1,564	4.96	278	0.88	238	0.75
Dolores	10,037	62.87	4,681	29.32	1,140	7.14	56	0.35	51	0.32
General Luna	7,045	53.50	5,370	40.78	636	4.83	82	0.62	35	0.27
General Nakar	9,829	55.95	4,319	24.59	3,138	17.86	201	1.14	79	0.45
Guinayangan	14,691	74.43	3,757	19.03	1,102	5.58	138	0.70	50	0.25
Gumaca	20,168	60.34	11,187	33.47	1,441	4.31	477	1.43	152	0.45
Infanta	18,428	52.70	9,293	26.57	6,878	19.67	242	0.69	130	0.37
Jomalig	2,129	68.61	489	15.76	447	14.41	21	0.68	17	0.55
Lopez	29,454	68.18	10,485	24.27	2,701	6.25	371	0.86	191	0.44
Lucban	13,129	48.94	9,214	34.35	4,138	15.43	236	0.88	109	0.41
Lucena	119,691	–	21,705	–	7,673	–	712	–	296	–
Macalelon	8,567	66.35	3,571	27.66	603	4.67	100	0.77	71	0.55
Mauban	15,998	47.28	11,232	33.19	6,221	18.38	293	0.87	96	0.28
Mulanay	15,539	62.02	7,768	31.01	1,428	5.70	202	0.81	117	0.47
Padre Burgos	7,790	65.30	3,362	28.18	662	5.55	73	0.61	43	0.36
Pagbilao	20,028	57.86	10,585	30.58	3,674	10.61	234	0.68	93	0.27
Panukulan	3,554	46.42	2,281	29.79	1,735	22.66	61	0.80	25	0.33
Patnanungan	4,374	70.37	1,111	17.87	640	10.30	55	0.88	36	0.58
Perez	4,653	72.67	1,295	20.22	404	6.31	35	0.55	16	0.25
Pitogo	8,046	64.11	3,656	29.13	661	5.27	127	1.01	61	0.49
Plaridel	4,750	73.47	1,454	22.49	200	3.09	44	0.68	17	0.26
Polillo	5,693	38.41	6,673	45.02	2,280	15.38	122	0.82	55	0.37
Quezon	5,125	64.13	2,311	28.92	480	6.01	54	0.68	22	0.28
Real	9,509	54.75	4,972	28.63	2,688	15.48	129	0.74	69	0.40
Sampaloc	3,393	46.17	2,808	38.21	1,093	14.87	39	0.53	16	0.22
San Andres	7,334	57.23	4,269	33.31	1,018	7.94	139	1.08	56	0.44
San Antonio	13,986	73.58	3,847	20.24	1,089	5.73	53	0.28	32	0.17
San Francisco	15,242	58.26	9,082	34.72	1,553	5.94	190	0.73	94	0.36
San Narciso	13,906	69.07	5,276	26.20	775	3.85	95	0.47	82	0.41
Sariaya	47,791	63.95	21,801	29.17	4,590	6.14	296	0.40	251	0.34
Tagkawayan	14,095	59.31	7,798	32.81	1,524	6.41	230	0.97	118	0.50
Tayabas	23,948	45.36	16,224	30.73	12,083	22.88	350	0.66	195	0.37
Tiaong	33,501	65.78	12,465	24.47	4,424	8.69	291	0.57	250	0.49
Unisan	7,695	55.74	5,593	40.52	411	2.98	71	0.51	34	0.25
TOTAL	665,442	63.25	283,530	26.95	91,906	8.74	7,398	0.70	3,816	0.36

=== Provincial board elections ===
Party	Votes	%	Seats
Nationalist People's Coalition	983,938	47.33	7
Nacionalista	408,758	19.66	2
Lakas–CMD	269,222	12.95	0
Aksyon	106,875	5.14	0
National Unity Party	83,661	4.02	1
PRP	75,777	3.65	0
PDP-Laban	74,158	3.57	0
Labor Party Philippines	21,613	1.04	0
Liberal	6,503	0.31	0
Independent	48,181	2.32	0
Ex officio seats			3
Total	2,078,686	100.00	13

==== 1st District ====
2022 Provincial Board Election in 1st District of Quezon
Party	Candidate	Votes	%
NPC	Jerry Talaga	143,014	11.71
NPC	Julius Jay Luces	94,709	7.76
Lakas	Pauline Anne Bazar	74,985	6.14
Lakas	Ferdinand Llamas III	48,962	4.01
Aksyon	Waqui Kelly Portes	28,993	2.37
Independent	Joselito Santelices	6,622	0.54
Total votes		397,285	100.00

==== 2nd District ====
2022 Provincial Board Election in 2nd District of Quezon
Party	Candidate	Votes	%
NPC	Vinnette Alcala	209,330	17.14
Nacionalista	Maria Yllana Liwanag	201,048	16.46
Nacionalista	Ferdinand Talabong	193,125	15.81
NPC	Neil Emerson Sio	135,291	11.08
PDP–Laban	Wilfredo Baldonado	74,158	6.07
Independent	Erwin Perez	14,955	1.22
Nacionalista	Adrian Tiongco	14,585	1.19
Independent	Olivia Maaño	12,598	1.03
Independent	Renato Casiño	10,090	0.83
Total votes		865,180	100.00

==== 3rd District ====
2022 Provincial Board Election in 3rd District of Quezon
Party	Candidate	Votes	%
NUP	Jet Suarez	83,661	6.85
NPC	John Joseph Aquivido	78,225	6.41
Aksyon	Vincent Dominic Reyes	77,882	6.38
PRP	Jose Erwin Esguerra	75,777	6.21
NPC	Rodolfo Orfanel	12,734	1.04
Liberal	Rommel Anca	6,503	0.53
Independent	Eduardo Dural	3,916	0.32
Total votes		338,698	100.00

==== 4th District ====
2022 Provincial Board Election in 4th District of Quezon
Party	Candidate	Votes	%
NPC	Isaias Ubana II	125,881	10.30
NPC	Harold Butardo	103,681	8.49
NPC	Roderick Magbuhos	81,073	6.64
Lakas	Raquel Mendoza	65,455	5.36
Lakas	Narciso Malite	49,135	4.02
Lakas	Zeddrick Magbuhos	30,685	2.51
WPP	Imelda Mendoza	21,613	1.77
Total votes		477,453	100.00

== Congressional elections ==
=== 1st District ===
Incumbent Representative Mark Enverga is running for reelection.

2022 Philippine House of Representatives election at Quezon's 1st district
Party	Candidate	Votes	%
NPC	Mark Enverga	277,126	86.18
KBL	Teresita Dator	32,823	12.45
Independent	Francisco Rubio	2,613	0.99
Independent	Lamberto Cubilo	996	0.38
Total votes		313,558	100.00
NPC hold			

=== 2nd District ===
Incumbent Representative David Suarez is running for reelection. One of his opponents is former Department of Agriculture Secretary and former second district representative Proceso Alcala. Another challenger is local artist and civic volunteer Abigail Jashael "Abi" Bagabaldo.

2022 Philippine House of Representatives election at Quezon's 2nd district
Party	Candidate	Votes	%
Nacionalista	David Suarez	207,836	52.93
NPC	Proceso Alcala	173,639	44.22
Reporma	Antonio Punzalan	6,038	1.54
Independent	Abigail Jashael Bagabaldo	3,129	0.80
Independent	Alejandro Nebu	2,026	0.52
Total votes		392,668	100.00
Nacionalista hold			

=== 3rd District ===
Incumbent Representative Aleta Suarez is running for reelection.

2022 Philippine House of Representatives election at Quezon's 3rd district
Party	Candidate	Votes	%
Reporma	Reynante Arrogancia	122,379	58.47
Lakas	Aleta Suarez	76,174	36.39
WPP	Ruel Arogante	7,794	3.72
PRP	Analyn Suarez	2,966	1.42
Total votes		209,313	100.00
Reporma gain from Lakas			

=== 4th District ===
Incumbent Representative Angelina Tan is term-limited and is running for governor. Her son Mike is her party's nominee.

2022 Philippine House of Representatives election at Quezon's 4th district
Party	Candidate	Votes	%
NPC	Keith Micah Tan	166,591	72.89
Lakas	Rhodora Tan	43,862	19.19
NUP	Fernando Martinez	12,193	5.34
WPP	Rhodora Legaspi	2,705	1.18
Independent	Florenio Tierra	2,191	0.96
PRP	Resty Martinez	1,003	0.44
Total votes		228,545	100.00
NPC hold			

== Lucena local elections ==
Lucena is an independent component city and is not jurisdictionally part of Quezon, but is often grouped with it.

=== Mayoralty elections ===
Incumbent Rhoderick Alcala is term-limited and is running for Vice Mayor. His son, Mark is his party's nominee. His opponents are incumbent councilor Sunshine Abcede and incumbent Board Member Romano Franco Talaga. Incumbent Vice Mayor Philip Castillo died on February 19, 2022. He was substituted by Deric Castillo.

Lucena City mayoralty election
Party	Candidate	Votes	%
PDP–Laban	Mark Don Victor Alcala	104,216	66.23
PRP	Romano Franco Talaga	31,659	20.12
KANP	Sunshine Abcede-Llaga	17,651	11.22
PROMDI	Deric Castillo^{[A]}	3,373	2.14
Independent	Ruel Rojo	219	0.14
Independent	Edgardo Zeta	139	0.09
Independent	Pedrito Maralit	107	0.07
Total votes		157,364	100.00

Notes

- A Vice Mayor Philip Castillo died on February 19, 2022. His son, Deric Castillo, was named as his substitute.

=== Vice Mayoralty elections ===
Incumbent Anacleto Alcala III, who assumed post due to the death of Vice Mayor Philip Castillo is running for Vice Governor. Running for the position are incumbent Mayor Rhoderick Alcala, Serafin Meera, Jr. and incumbent councilor Nilo Villapando.

Lucena City vice mayoralty election
Party	Candidate	Votes	%
PDP–Laban	Roderick "Dondon" Alcala	113,654	74.68
PRP	Nilo Villapando	37,474	24.62
Independent	Serafin Meera, Jr.	1,063	0.70
Total votes		152,191	100.00

=== City council elections ===
Lucena City Council election
Party	Candidate	Votes	%
PDP–Laban	Ryan Caezar Alcala	92,599	57.10
PDP–Laban	Danilo Faller	88,069	54.31
PDP–Laban	Wilbert Noche	84,292	51.98
PDP–Laban	Patrick Nobert Nadera	81,920	50.51
PDP–Laban	Americo Lacerna	77,587	47.84
PROMDI	Benito Brizuela Jr.	77,242	47.63
Liberal	Nicanor Pedro Jr.	67,263	41.48
Independent	Edwin Pureza	61,280	37.79
PDP–Laban	Jose Christian Ona	61,194	37.73
NPC	Elizabeth Sio	50,875	31.37
NPC	Rey Oliver Alejandrino	50,054	30.86
Independent	John Angelo Buñag	40,623	25.05
NPC	John Bunyan Calamigan III	39,047	24.08
NPC	Rogelio Traqueña	35,365	21.81
NPC	Fidel Victor Paulo	33,796	20.84
NPC	Godison Dimaculangan	33,191	20.47
NPC	Bernard Tagarao	32,714	20.17
NPC	Danilo Zaballero	30,952	19.09
PDP–Laban	Christa Dhel Castillo Robedillo	28,751	17.73
Aksyon	Michael Dalida	21,950	13.53
PDP–Laban	Cresencio Buenaflor Jr.	20,015	12.34
PDP–Laban	Francis Josef Ryan Villafuerte	17,507	10.80
Independent	Ariel Baldonado	14,813	9.13
Akbayan	Peter Daleon	14,578	8.99
KBL	Epifanio Montecalbo Jr.	10,500	6.47
Independent	Joseph Veluya	6,240	3.85
Independent	Adonis Bibit	4,816	2.97
Independent	Edwin Aman	3,802	2.34
Independent	Jose Arnel Oxina	2,621	1.62
Independent	Ferdinand Endiape	2,591	1.60
Total votes		1,186,247	100.00

== City and municipal elections ==
=== 1st District ===
- City: Tayabas City
- Municipalities: Burdeos, General Nakar, Infanta, Jomalig, Lucban, Mauban, Pagbilao, Panukulan, Patnanungan, Polillo, Real, Sampaloc

==== Tayabas City ====
Incumbent Ernida Reynoso is running for reelection. Her opponents are incumbent Vice Mayor Manuel Victorio Manaig and incumbent Vice Governor Samuel Nantes.

Tayabas City mayoralty election
Party	Candidate	Votes	%
Nacionalista	Ernida Agpi Reynoso	27,927	49.73
Aksyon	Samuel Nantes	19,179	34.15
PRP	Manuel Victorio Manaig	9,053	16.12
Margin of victory		8,748	
Invalid or blank votes		161	
Total votes		58,209	100
Nacionalista hold			

==== Burdeos ====
Burdeos mayoralty election
Party	Candidate	Votes	%
NPC	Freddie Aman	4,980	43.27
Nacionalista	Julius Ceazar Florido	4,764	41.39
PFP	Alice Cuerdo	1,764	15.32
Margin of victory		216	
Invalid or blank votes		513	
Total votes		11,508	100
NPC hold			

==== General Nakar ====
General Nakar mayoralty election
Party	Candidate	Votes	%
Nacionalista	Elisio Ruzol	10,971	53.59
NPC	Fred Pujeda	8,853	43.24
Independent	Leovegildo Ruzol	646	3.15
Margin of victory		2,118	
Invalid or blank votes		526	
Total votes		20,470	100
Nacionalista hold			

==== Infanta ====
Infanta mayoralty election
Party	Candidate	Votes	%
Nacionalista	Filipina Grace America	24,034	63.01
NPC	Eriberto Escueta	13,913	36,47
Independent	Ednon Verano	194	.50
Margin of victory		38,141	
Invalid or blank votes		1,211	
Total votes		39,549	100
Nacionalista hold			

==== Jomalig ====
Jomalig mayoralty election
Party	Candidate	Votes	%
Lakas	Nelmar Sarmiento	2,164	50.15
NPC	Rodel Espiritu	2,151	49.85
Margin of victory		13	
Invalid or blank votes		189	
Total votes		4,315	100
Lakas gain from NPC			

==== Lucban ====
Lucban mayoralty election
Party	Candidate	Votes	%
PRP	Agustin Villaverde	13,669	47.09
NPC	Cel Gina Dator	10,528	36.27
Nacionalista	Maria Placino	2,434	8.38
Liberal	Lyncelle Dator-Macandile	1,370	4.72
Independent	Mario Ramos	572	1.97
PDP–Laban	Merton Deveza	452	1.55
Margin of victory		3,141	
Invalid or blank votes		670	
Total votes		29,025	100
PRP gain from NPC			

==== Mauban ====
Mauban mayoralty election
Party	Candidate	Votes	%
NPC	Erwin Pastrana	18,997	50.66
Nacionalista	Marita Llamas	18,331	48.88
Independent	Oscar Jugueta	122	.32
Independent	Apolonio Quizon	45	.12
Margin of victory		686	
Invalid or blank votes		1,138	
Total votes		37,495	100
NPC gain from Nacionalista			

==== Pagbilao ====
Pagbilao mayoralty election
Party	Candidate	Votes	%
Nacionalista	Angelica Portes-Tatlonghari	20,280	52.16
Independent	Timoteo Batilo	12,168	31.30
NPC	Joseph Garcia	4,432	11.40
Independent	Ariel Martinez	1,927	4.95
Independent	Reynaldo de Pala	66	.16
Margin of victory		8,112	
Invalid or blank votes		1,451	
Total votes		38,873	100
Nacionalista hold			

==== Panukulan ====
Panukulan mayoralty election
Party	Candidate	Votes	%
Nacionalista	Alfred Rigor Mitra	7,205	100
Margin of victory		0	
Invalid or blank votes		2,321	
Total votes		7,205	100
Nacionalista hold			

==== Patnanugan ====
Patnanungan mayoralty election
Party	Candidate	Votes	%
NPC	Clara Larita	6,081	100
Margin of victory		0	
Invalid or blank votes		1,164	
Total votes		6,081	100
NPC hold			

==== Polilio ====
Polillo mayoralty election
Party	Candidate	Votes	%
Lakas	Angelique Bosque	9,830	57.48
NPC	Rio Espiritu	6,692	39.13
PFP	May Estuita	344	2.01
PFP	Agnes Abagat	234	1.36
Margin of victory		3,138	
Invalid or blank votes		620	
Total votes		17,100	100
Lakas hold			

==== Real ====
Real mayoralty election
Party	Candidate	Votes	%
Nacionalista	Bing Aquino	11,834	62.06
NPC	Lea Calleja	7,114	37.30
Independent	Renz Esmeralda	120	.62
Margin of victory		4,720	
Invalid or blank votes		795	
Total votes		19,068	100
Nacionalista hold			

==== Sampaloc ====
Sampaloc mayoralty election
Party	Candidate	Votes	%
PRP	Gelo Devanadera	5,315	63.81
Liberal	Jan Paul Jarafa	3,014	36.18
Margin of victory		2,301	
Invalid or blank votes		281	
Total votes		8,329	100
PRP hold			

=== 2nd District ===
- City: Lucena City
- Municipalities: Candelaria, Dolores, San Antonio, Sariaya, Tiaong

==== Candelaria ====
Incumbent Macario Boongaling is running for Vice Mayor. His party nominated incumbent Vice Mayor George Suayan. His opponents are incumbent LMB President Ireneo Boongaling who happens to be the cousin of the incumbent mayor and former Mayor Ferdinand Maliwanag.

Candelaria mayoralty election
Party	Candidate	Votes	%
NPC	George Suayan	35,043	50.43
Aksyon	Ferdinand Maliwanag	25,073	36.08
Independent	Ireneo Boongaling	9,367	13.48
Margin of victory		9,970	
Invalid or blank votes		2,018	
Total votes		69,483	100
NPC hold			

==== Dolores ====
Incumbent Orlan Calayag is running for reelection.

Dolores mayoralty election
Party	Candidate	Votes	%
Nacionalista	Orlan Calayag	9,849	54.61
NPC	Danilo Amat	8,183	45.38
Margin of victory		1,666	
Invalid or blank votes		334	
Total votes		18,032	100
Nacionalista hold			

==== San Antonio ====
Erick Wagan is term-limited. His party nominated former Mayor Aniano Ariel Wagan.

San Antonio mayoralty election
Party	Candidate	Votes	%
Nacionalista	Aniano Ariel Wagan, Jr.	11,361	53.45
NPC	Jay Vesliño	8,311	39.10
WPP	Rodante Hernandez	1,557	7.32
Independent	Feliciano Leynes	23	.10
Margin of victory		3,050	
Invalid or blank votes		456	
Total votes		21,252	
Nacionalista hold			

==== Sariaya ====
Incumbent Marcelo Gayeta is running for reelection unopposed.

Sariaya mayoralty election
Party	Candidate	Votes	%
PDP–Laban	Marcelo Gayeta	72,311	100
Invalid or blank votes		12,147	
Total votes		72,311	100
PDP–Laban hold			

==== Tiaong ====
Incumbent Ramon Preza is term-limited. His party nominated incumbent Vice Mayor William Razon.

Tiaong mayoralty election
Party	Candidate	Votes	%
Nacionalista	Vincent Arjey Mea	37,504	65.85
Independent	William Razon	18,361	32.24
Independent	Raul Aldovino	1,085	1.90
Margin of victory		19,143	
Invalid or blank votes		1,314	
Total votes		56,950	100
Nacionalista hold			

=== 3rd District ===
- Municipalities: Agdangan, Buenavista, Catanauan, General Luna, Macalelon, Mulanay, Padre Burgos, Pitogo, San Andres, San Francisco, San Narciso, Unisan

==== Agdangan ====
Agdangan mayoralty election
Party	Candidate	Votes	%
Nacionalista	Rhadam Aguilar	4,316	54.37
NPC	Juancho Parafina	3,621	45.62
Margin of victory		695	
Invalid or blank votes		272	
Total votes		7,937	100
Nacionalista hold			

==== Buenavista ====
Buenavista mayoralty election
Party	Candidate	Votes	%
PROMDI	Reynaldo Rosilla, Jr.	8,697	52.30
Lakas	Maria Remedios Rivera	7,932	47.69
Margin of victory		705	
Invalid or blank votes		777	
Total votes		16,629	100
PROMDI gain from Lakas			

==== Catanauan ====
Catanauan mayoralty election
Party	Candidate	Votes	%
Aksyon	Ramon Orfanel	18,711	50.35
NPC	Leonardo Abella	10,895	29.32
PDP–Laban	Bas Serrano	7,552	20.32
Margin of victory		7,816	
Invalid or blank votes		1,248	
Total votes		37,158	100
Aksyon hold			

==== General Luna ====
General Luna mayoralty election
Party	Candidate	Votes	%
Nacionalista	Matt Erwin Florido	8,403	56.84
NPC	Benson Sangalang	6,314	42.71
Independent	Adelino Maraya	66	.44
Margin of victory		2,089	
Invalid or blank votes		477	
Total votes		14,783	100
Nacionalista hold			

==== Macalelon ====
Macalelon mayoralty election
Party	Candidate	Votes	%
NPC	Artemio Mamburao	8,931	61.86
PDP–Laban	Marvin Tan	5,506	38.13
Margin of victory		3,475	
Invalid or blank votes		599	
Total votes		14,437	100
NPC gain from PDP–Laban			

==== Mulanay ====
Mulanay mayoralty election
Party	Candidate	Votes	%
PDP–Laban	Aris Aguirre	16,543	56.20
Reporma	Jay Tito Ojeda II	12,891	43.79
Invalid or blank votes		1,232	
Total votes		29,434	100
PDP–Laban gain from Reporma			

==== Padre Burgos ====
Padre Burgos mayoralty election
Party	Candidate	Votes	%
NPC	Ruben Uy Diokno	5,960	45.43
Aksyon	Hackett Pasia	3,778	28.80
Independent	Pablito Flores	3,380	25.76
Margin of victory		2,182	
Invalid or blank votes		610	
Total votes		13,118	100
NPC hold			

==== Pitogo ====
Pitogo mayoralty election
Party	Candidate	Votes	%
Reporma	Dexter Sayat	8,536	58.11
Aksyon	Dennis Gliane	6,153	41.88
Margin of victory		2,383	
Invalid or blank votes		321	
Total votes		14,689	100
Reporma hold			

==== San Andres ====
San Andres mayoralty election
Party	Candidate	Votes	%
PDP–Laban	Giovanne Lim	11,070	74.35
Independent	Paterno Arrabis, Jr.	3,819	25.64
Margin of victory		7,251	
Invalid or blank votes		1,253	
Total votes		14,889	100
PDP–Laban hold			

==== San Francisco ====
San Francisco mayoralty election
Party	Candidate	Votes	%
Nacionalista	Romulo Edaño Sr.	17,290	52.12
NPC	Joselito Alega	15,878	47.87
Margin of victory		1,412	
Invalid or blank votes		1,275	
Total votes		33,168	100
Nacionalista gain from PDP–Laban			

==== San Narciso ====
San Narciso mayoralty election
Party	Candidate	Votes	%
PRP	Pobel Uy-Yap	19,926	85.05
Aksyon	Hanson Blanca	3,501	14.94
Margin of victory		16,425	
Invalid or blank votes		1,822	
Total votes		23,427	100
PRP hold			

==== Unisan ====
Unisan mayoralty election
Party	Candidate	Votes	%
NPC	Ferdinand Adulta	7,946	51.91
Lakas	Junjun Suarez	7,197	47.02
PROMDI	Roly Villegas	163	1.06
Margin of victory		7,999	
Invalid or blank votes		495	
Total votes		15,306	100
NPC hold			

=== 4th District ===
- Municipalities: Alabat, Atimonan, Calauag, Guinayangan, Gumaca, Lopez, Perez, Plaridel, Quezon, Tagkawayan

==== Alabat ====
Alabat mayoralty election
Party	Candidate	Votes	%
Independent	Jose Ramil Arquiza	4,412	45.77
Nacionalista	Evangeline Mesa	2,859	29.66
NPC	Boyet Hirang	2,368	24.56
Margin of victory		1,553	
Invalid or blank votes		250	
Total votes		9,639	100
Independent gain from Nacionalista			

==== Atimonan ====
Atimonan mayoralty election
Party	Candidate	Votes	%
NPC	Rustico Joven Mendoza	18,436	60.27
PDP–Laban	Elmer Escosia	12,153	39.72
Margin of victory		6,283	
Invalid or blank votes		1,420	
Total votes		3,589	100
NPC hold			

==== Calauag ====
Calauag mayoralty election
Party	Candidate	Votes	%
NPC	Rosalina Visorde	21,679	57.54
Reporma	Eric Entienza	11,411	30.29
Lakas	Lyndon Guerrero	3,966	10.52
Independent	Armando Mendoza	514	1.36
Independent	Bernabe Maravilla	101	.26
Margin of victory		10,268	
Invalid or blank votes		1,211	
Total votes		37,671	100
NPC hold			

==== Guinayangan ====
Guinayangan mayoralty election
Party	Candidate	Votes	%
NPC	Maden Isaac	13,742	59.18
Nacionalista	Obet Gajo	9,352	40.27
WPP	Josie Enoval	126	.54
Margin of victory		4,390	
Invalid or blank votes		702	
Total votes		23,220	100
NPC gain from Nacionalista			

==== Gumaca ====
Gumaca mayoralty election
Party	Candidate	Votes	%
Nacionalista	Webster Letargo	20,696	56
NPC	Erwin Caralian	16,258	44
Margin of victory		4,438	
Invalid or blank votes		1,511	
Total votes		36,954	100
Nacionalista hold			

==== Lopez ====
Lopez mayoralty election
Party	Candidate	Votes	%
NPC	Rachel Ubaña	34,801	72.10
Lakas	Arkie Manuel Yulde	7,884	16.33
NUP	Joedil Barros	5,580	11.56
Margin of victory		26,917	
Invalid or blank votes		2,836	
Total votes		48,265	100
NPC hold			

==== Perez ====
Perez mayoralty election
Party	Candidate	Votes	%
NPC	Morel Escalona	5,868	73.68
PRP	Marla Reyes	2,096	26.31
Margin of victory		3,772	
Invalid or blank votes		376	
Total votes		7,884	100
NPC hold			

==== Plaridel ====
Plaridel mayoralty election
Party	Candidate	Votes	%
NPC	Jose Saavedra	3,946	52.62
PRP	Wilfredo Magbuhos	3,552	47.37
Margin of victory		394	
Invalid or blank votes		179	
Total votes		7,498	100
NPC hold			

==== Quezon ====
Quezon mayoralty election
Party	Candidate	Votes	%
Independent	Juan Escolano	5,803	62.05
NPC	Cherry Clacio	3,548	37.94
Margin of victory		2,255	
Invalid or blank votes		289	
Total votes		9,351	100
Independent gain from NPC			

==== Tagkawayan ====
Tagkawayan mayoralty election
Party	Candidate	Votes	%
NPC	Carlo Eleazar	16,028	55.51
Lakas	Jojo Frondoso	12,842	44.48
Margin of victory		2,794	
Invalid or blank votes		1,079	
Total votes		28,870	100
NPC hold			
