= 2025 Quezon local elections =

Philippine elections

2025 Quezon gubernatorial election
- May 12, 2025
- Gubernatorial elections
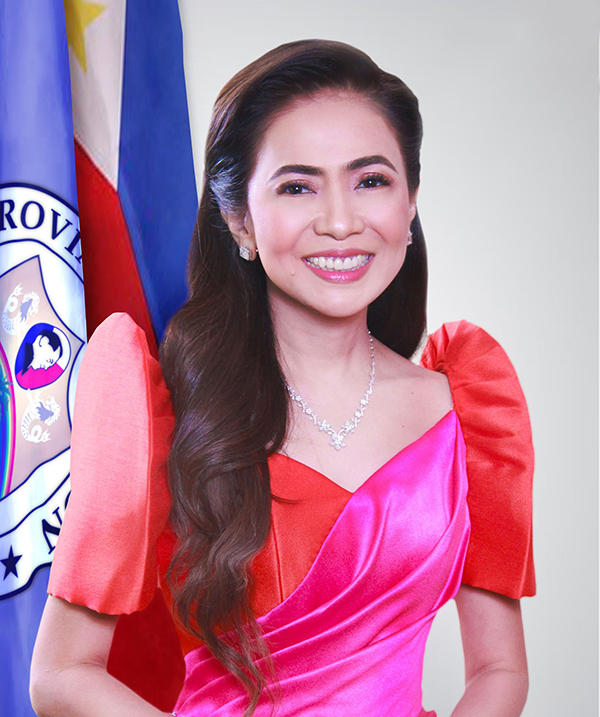
Nominee	Helen Tan
Party	Stan Q
Running mate	Anacleto Alcala III
Popular vote	1,011,465
Percentage	100%
- Results per municipality and city
Governor before election
Helen Tan
NPC
Elected Governor
Helen Tan
Stan Q
- Vice gubernatorial elections
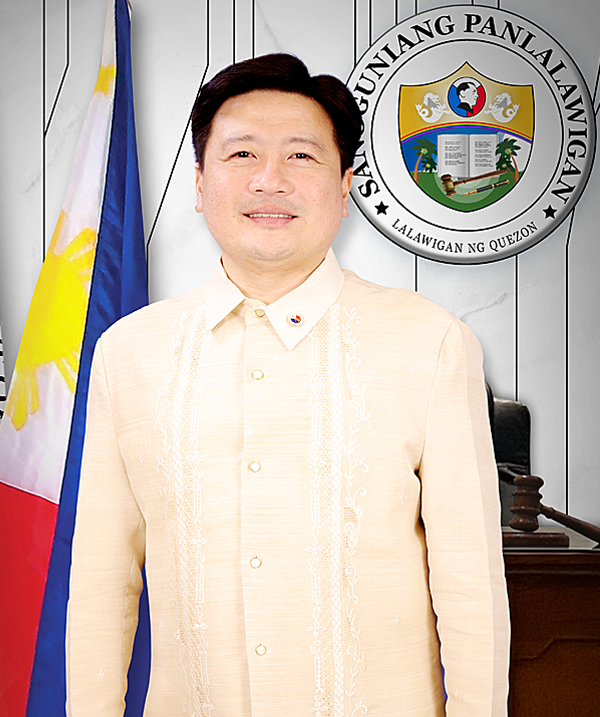
Nominee	Anacleto Alcala III	Teodorico Capina	Armingol Alpajora
Party	Stan Q	Independent	KBL
Alliance		Independent	KBL
Popular vote	851,518	28,759	24,065
Percentage	94.16%	3.18%	2.66%
Vice Governor before election
Anacleto Alcala III
NPC
Elected Vice Governor
Anacleto Alcala III
Stan Q

Local elections were held in the province of Quezon on May 12, 2025, as part of the 2025 general election. Voters will select candidates for all local positions: a town mayor, vice mayor and town councilors, as well as members of the Sangguniang Panlalawigan, the vice-governor, governor and representatives for the four districts of Quezon.

== Provincial elections ==
=== Gubernatorial election ===
Parties are as stated in their certificate of candidacies.

Incumbent governor Angelina Tan, Vice Governor Anacleto Alcalla III and majority of district representatives are running virtually unopposed.

Quezon gubernatorial election
Party	Candidate	Votes	%
Stan Q	Angelina "Doktora Helen" Tan	1,011,465	100
Total votes		1,011,465	100
Rejected ballots		240,740	19.23
Turnout		1,252,205	83.70
Registered electors		1,496,156	
Stan Q hold			
Source: Commission on Elections

=== Vice Gubernatorial election ===
Parties are as stated in their certificate of candidacies.

Quezon vice gubernatorial election
Party	Candidate	Votes	%
Stan Q	Anacleto Alcala III	851,518	94.16
Independent	Teodorico Capina	28,759	3.18
KBL	Armingol Alpajora	24,065	2.66
Total votes		904,342	100
Rejected ballots		347,863	27.78
Turnout		1,252,205	83.70
Registered electors		1,496,156	
Stan Q hold			
Source: Commission on Elections

=== Provincial board elections ===
Ten regular members of the Quezon Provincial Board are up for election. Three each for second and fourth districts and two each for first and third district.

Party	Votes	%	Seats
Stand Up Quezon	1,243,337	75.79	9
Lakas–CMD	98,638	6.01	1
Nationalist People's Coalition	88,837	5.41	0
Partido Federal ng Pilipinas	80,233	4.89	0
Aksyon Demokratiko	76,500	4.66	0
Independent	46,940	2.86	0
Kilusang Bagong Lipunan	6,113	0.37	0
Ex officio seats			3
Total	1,640,598	100.00	13

==== 1st District ====
Board Member Claro Talaga is term-limited, he is running for councilor of Tayabas. Julius Jay Luces is running for re-election for his second term.

2025 Provincial Board Election in 1st District of Quezon
Party	Candidate	Votes	%
Stan Q	Julius Jay Luces	128,536	29.64
Lakas	Sam Nantes	98,638	22.74
NPC	Gen. Elmo Ringo Sarona	88,837	20.48
PFP	Alona Obispo	75,357	17.38
Independent	Christian Paul Alcala	36,195	8.35
KBL	Nathalie Garcia	6,113	1.41
Total votes		433,676	100
Source: Commission on Elections

==== 2nd District ====
Incumbent Vinnete Alcala and Maria Yllana Liwanag are running for reelection. Gov. Helen Tan's son, Doc Kim Tan is vying for the 3rd slot previously held by Bong Talabong who died last 2024.

2025 Provincial Board Election in 2nd District of Quezon
Party	Candidate	Votes	%
Stan Q	Doc Kim Tan	253,568	45.88
Stan Q	Vinnette Alcala-Naca	169,113	30.6
Stan Q	Maria Yllana Liwanag	129,967	23.52
Total votes		552,648	100
Source: Commission on Elections

==== 3rd District ====
Board member Donald Suarez is term-limited and is not running for any position. John Joseph Aquivido is running for reelection.

2025 Provincial Board Election in 3rd District of Quezon
Party	Candidate	Votes	%
Stan Q	Meg Esguerra	131,634	38.17
Stan Q	John Joseph Aquivido	121,088	35.11
Aksyon	Tintin Reyes	76,500	22.18
Independent	Bieto Gonzales	10,745	3.12
PFP	Conrado Diaz	4,876	1.41
Total votes		344,843	100
Source: Commission on Elections

==== 4th District ====
Harold Butardo is running for reelection. Sonny Ubana is term-limited and is running for Mayor of Lopez, Quezon. His wife and current mayor Rachel Ubana is now running for board member. Board Member Roderick Magbuhos is running for Mayor of Atimonan, Quezon.

2025 Provincial Board Election in 4th District of Quezon
Party	Candidate	Votes	%
Stan Q	Rachel Ubana	117,552	37.99
Stan Q	Harold Butardo	112,414	36.33
Stan Q	Ola Eduarte	79,465	25.68
Total votes		309,431	100
Source: Commission on Elections

== Congressional elections ==
=== 1st District ===
Incumbent representative Mark Enverga is running for reelection unopposed.

2025 Philippine House of Representatives election at Quezon's 1st district
Party	Candidate	Votes	%
NPC	Mark Enverga	252,236	100
Rejected ballots		65,019	20.49
Turnout		317,255	84.14
Registered electors		377,065	
NPC hold			
Source: Commission on Elections

=== 2nd District ===
Incumbent representative David Suarez is running for reelection unopposed.

2025 Philippine House of Representatives election at Quezon's 2nd district
Party	Candidate	Votes	%
Lakas	David Suarez	286,091	100
Rejected ballots		158,767	35.69
Turnout		444,858	86.18
Registered electors		516,199	
Lakas hold			
Source: Commission on Elections

=== 3rd District ===
Incumbent representative Reynante Arrogancia is running for reelection. His opponent is General Luna, Quezon Mayor Matt Florido.

2025 Philippine House of Representatives election at Quezon's 3rd district
Party	Candidate	Votes	%
Reporma	Reynante Arrogancia	163,239	69.55
Independent	Matt Florido	71,645	30.45
Rejected ballots		18,753	7.4
Turnout		253,457	83.34
Registered electors		304,144	
Reporma hold			
Source: Commission on Elections

=== 4th District ===
Incumbent representative Mike Tan is running for reelection unopposed.

2025 Philippine House of Representatives election at Quezon's 4th district
Party	Candidate	Votes	%
NPC	Keith Micah Tan	199,930	100
Rejected ballots		36,705	11.57
Turnout		317,255	79.21
Registered electors		298,748	
NPC hold			
Source: Commission on Elections

== Lucena local elections ==
Lucena is an independent component city and is not jurisdictionally part of Quezon, but is often grouped with it.

=== Mayoralty elections ===
Incumbent Mark Alcala is running for reelection.

Lucena City mayoralty election
Party	Candidate	Votes	%
Stan Q	Mark Don Victor Alcala	136,006	90.27%
PM	Efren Cruzat	10,320	6.85%
Independent	Benjamin Padiernos Jr.	4,336	2.88%
Margin of victory		125,686	83.42%
Invalid or blank votes		19,426	9.74%
Total votes		199,416	100%
Stan Q hold			

=== Vice Mayoralty elections ===
Incumbent Rhoderick Alcala is running for reelection.

Lucena City vice mayoralty election
Party	Candidate	Votes	%
Stan Q	Roderick "Dondon" Alcala	129,578	87.10%
Independent	Boyet Alejandrino	15,510	10.43%
PM	Marbien De Juan Sr.	3,687	2.48%
Margin of victory		114,068	76.67%
Invalid or blank votes		21,313	10.69%
Total votes		199,416	100%
Stan Q hold			

== City and municipal elections ==
=== 1st District ===
- City: Tayabas
- Municipalities: Burdeos, General Nakar, Infanta, Jomalig, Lucban, Mauban, Pagbilao, Panukulan, Patnanungan, Polillo, Real, Sampaloc

==== Tayabas ====
Incumbent Lovely Reynoso-Pontioso who replaced Aida Reynoso upon her death is running for reelection. Her opponents are Kuya Piwa Lim and two independents.

Tayabas mayoralty election
Party	Candidate	Votes	%
NPC	Kuya Piwa Lim	32,310	53.46
Lakas	Lovely Reynoso-Pontioso	27,595	45.65
Independent	Kitz Pita	327	0.54
Independent	Haide Quinto	211	0.35
Margin of victory		4,715	7.81
Invalid or blank votes		1,411	2.34
Total votes		60,443	100
NPC gain from Lakas			

==== Burdeos ====
Burdeos mayoralty election
Party	Candidate	Votes	%
Stan Q	Gina Gonzales	6,148	54.27
NPC	Ariel Bendal	5,181	45.73
Margin of victory		967	
Invalid or blank votes		339	
Total votes		11,329	100
Stan Q gain from NPC			

==== General Nakar ====
General Nakar mayoralty election
Party	Candidate	Votes	%
PRP	Fred Pujeda	9,951	45.78
Nacionalista	Ambet Ruzol	7,720	35.52
WPP	Pol Art Ruzol	4,065	18.70
Margin of victory		2,231	
Invalid or blank votes		534	
Total votes		21,736	100
PRP gain from Nacionalista			

==== Infanta ====
Incumbent mayor Grace America is term-limited. Vice Mayor L.A. Ruanto and Ebit Escueta is vying for mayor.

Infanta mayoralty election
Party	Candidate	Votes	%
Stan Q	L.A. Ruanto	22,999	58.21
Lakas	Ebit Escueta	16,511	41.79
Margin of victory		6,488	
Invalid or blank votes		913	
Total votes		39,510	100
Stan Q gain from Nacionalista			

==== Jomalig ====
Jomalig mayoralty election
Party	Candidate	Votes	%
Nacionalista	Nelmar Sarmiento	2,935	59.29
NPC	Rodel Espiritu	2,015	40.71
Margin of victory		920	
Invalid or blank votes		117	
Total votes		4,950	100
Nacionalista hold			

==== Lucban ====
Incumbent Tenten Villaverde is running for reelection. His opponent is former mayor Oli Dator.

Lucban mayoralty election
Party	Candidate	Votes	%
Stan Q	Tenten Villaverde	17,838	62.86
AKAY	Oli Dator	10,539	37.14
Margin of victory		7,299	25.73
Invalid or blank votes		1,151	4.06
Total votes		36,961	100
Stan Q hold			

==== Mauban ====
Incumbent Erwin Pastrana is running for reelection. His opponent is former mayor Dingdong Llamas

Mauban mayoralty election
Party	Candidate	Votes	%
NPC	Erwin Pastrana	24,715	61.37
Nacionalista	Dingdong Llamas	15,558	38.63
Margin of victory		9,157	
Invalid or blank votes		707	
Total votes		40,273	
NPC hold			

==== Pagbilao ====
Incumbent Gigi Portes is running for reelection. Her opponent includes his sister and current Vice Mayor Shierre Ann Palicpic.

Pagbilao mayoralty election
Party	Candidate	Votes	%
NPC	Angelica Portes-Tatlonghari	21,167	52.49
Nacionalista	Shierre Ann Palicpic	18,634	46.21
Independent	Manny Veluz	386	.92
Independent	Gery Luce	138	.34
Margin of victory		2,533	
Invalid or blank votes		1,179	
Total votes		40,325	100
NPC hold			

==== Panukulan ====
Incumbent Alfred Rigor Mitra is running for reelection. His opponent is Atty. Badeth Virrey.

Panukulan mayoralty election
Party	Candidate	Votes	%
NPC	Alfred Rigor Mitra	5,970	59.66
PRP	Atty. Badeth Virrey	4,036	40.34
Margin of victory		1,934	19.32
Invalid or blank votes		192	1.61
Total votes		11,952	100
NPC hold			

==== Patnanugan ====
Incumbent Clara Larita is running unopposed.

Patnanungan mayoralty election
Party	Candidate	Votes	%
Stan Q	Clara Larita	5,142	100
Margin of victory		5,142	100
Invalid or blank votes		1,876	21.48
Total votes		8,734	100
Stan Q hold			

==== Polilio ====
Incumbent Angelique Bosque is running for reelection. Her opponent is Insan Santoalla.

Polillo mayoralty election
Party	Candidate	Votes	%
Nacionalista	Angelique Bosque	11,164	66.10
NPC	Insan Santoalla	5,726	33.90
Margin of victory		5,438	
Invalid or blank votes		605	
Total votes		16,890	100
Nacionalista hold			

==== Real ====
Incumbent mayor Bing Aquino is term-limited and is running for Vice Mayor. Her husband Admin Rainier Aquino is her party's nominee. The opponents are Vice Mayor Doyle Joel Diesto, Julie Ann Macasaet and Nimrod Balgemino.

Real mayoralty election
Party	Candidate	Votes	%
NPC	Julie Ann Macasaet	8,473	41.48
Nacionalista	Rainier Aquino	6,122	29.97
PRP	Doyle Joel Diesto	5,163	25.28
Independent	Nimrod Bagemino	667	3.27
Margin of victory		2,351	11.51
Invalid or blank votes		575	2.30
Total votes		25,009	100
NPC gain from Nacionalista			

==== Sampaloc ====
Incumbent mayor Gelo Devanadera is term-limited. His brother Nikko Devanadera running for mayor unopposed.

Sampaloc mayoralty election
Party	Candidate	Votes	%
Stan Q	Nikko Devanadera	5,517	100
Margin of victory		5,517	100
Invalid or blank votes		4,662	45.80
Total votes		10,179	100
Stan Q hold			

=== 2nd District ===
- City: Lucena City
- Municipalities: Candelaria, Dolores, San Antonio, Sariaya, Tiaong

==== Candelaria ====
Incumbent mayor George Suayan is running fo reeleection. His opponents are Fidel Cruz and former mayor Macky Boongaling.

Candelaria mayoralty election
Party	Candidate	Votes	%
Akbayan	George Suayan	39,246	52.65
NPC	Macky Boongaling	35,053	47.03
Independent	Fidel Cruz	237	0.32
Margin of victory		4,193	5.30
Invalid or blank votes		1,872	2.51
Total votes		89,174	100
Akbayan hold			

==== Dolores ====
Incumbent Orlan Calayag is running for reelection.

Dolores mayoralty election
Party	Candidate	Votes	%
Nacionalista	Orlan Calayag	14,806	80.46
Independent	Adriano Rico	3,596	19.54
Margin of victory		11,120	
Invalid or blank votes		874	
Total votes		18,402	100
Nacionalista hold			

==== San Antonio ====
Incumbent mayor Aniano Ariel Wagan is not running. Former mayor is running for the post. His opponent is Jay Vesliño.

San Antonio mayoralty election
Party	Candidate	Votes	%
NUP	Erick Wagan	11,690	51.17
Liberal	Jay Vesliño	11,155	48.83
Margin of victory		535	2.34
Invalid or blank votes		355	1.35
Total votes		26,335	100
NUP hold			

==== Sariaya ====
Incumbent Marcelo Gayeta is term limited. His wife Marivic Gayeta and incumbent Vice Mayor Alex Tolentino is vying for mayor.

Sariaya mayoralty election
Party	Candidate	Votes	%
Lakas	Marivic Gayeta	53,057	59.15
NPC	Alex Tolentino	36,645	40.85
Margin of victory		16,412	
Invalid or blank votes		2,300	
Total votes		89,702	100
Lakas gain from PDP–Laban			

==== Tiaong ====
Incumbent mayor Vincent Arjey Mea is running for reelection unopposed.

Tiaong mayoralty election
Party	Candidate	Votes	%
Lakas	Vincent Arjey Mea	48,753	100
Invalid or blank votes		15,131	
Total votes		48,753	100
Lakas hold			

=== 3rd District ===
- Municipalities: Agdangan, Buenavista, Catanauan, General Luna, Macalelon, Mulanay, Padre Burgos, Pitogo, San Andres, San Francisco, San Narciso, Unisan

==== Agdangan ====
Incumbent mayor Rhadam Aguilar is term-limited.

Agdangan mayoralty election
Party	Candidate	Votes	%
Stan Q	Venchie Aguilar	4,778	57.39
NPC	Gina Bartholomi	2,283	27.42
Lakas	Buko Par	977	11.74
PFP	Queenzy Riego	279	3.35
Independent	Edwin Santos	8	.1
Margin of victory		2,485	
Invalid or blank votes		202	
Total votes		8,325	100
Stan Q gain from Nacionalista			

==== Buenavista ====
Buenavista mayoralty election
Party	Candidate	Votes	%
Stan Q	Rey Rosilla	10,802	56.62
PFP	Ar Rivera	8,276	43.38
Margin of victory		2,526	
Invalid or blank votes		469	
Total votes		19,078	100
Stan Q hold			

==== Catanauan ====
Incumbent mayor Ramon Orfanel is running for reelection.

Catanauan mayoralty election
Party	Candidate	Votes	%
Stan Q	Ramon Orfanel	21,864	58.15
Lakas	Bas Serrano	15,735	41.85
Margin of victory		6,129	
Invalid or blank votes		1,314	
Total votes		37,599	100
Stan Q hold			

==== General Luna ====
Incumbent mayor Matt Erwin Florido is running for representative.

General Luna mayoralty election
Party	Candidate	Votes	%
Stan Q	Benson Sangalang	8,053	53.12
Aksyon	Julius Florido	7,108	46.88
Margin of victory		945	
Invalid or blank votes		366	
Total votes		15,161	100
Stan Q gain from Aksyon			

==== Macalelon ====
Incumbent mayor Artemio Mamburao is running for reelection. His opponent is Atty. Vic Giminez.

Macalelon mayoralty election
Party	Candidate	Votes	%
Stan Q	Artemio Mamburao	9,758	70.32
Independent	Atty. Vic Giminez	4,118	29.68
Margin of victory		366	
Invalid or blank votes		847	
Total votes		13,876	100
Stan Q hold			

==== Mulanay ====
Incumbent mayor Aris Aguirre is running for reelection. His opponent is former mayor Tito Ojeda.

Mulanay mayoralty election
Party	Candidate	Votes	%
Stan Q	Aris Aguirre	18,496	63.88
Lakas	Tito Ojeda	10,194	35.21
Independent	Tito Olveda	264	.91
Margin of victory		8,302	
Invalid or blank votes		1,085	
Total votes		28,954	100
Stan Q hold			

==== Padre Burgos ====
Incumbent mayor Ruben Uy Diokno is running for reelection.

Padre Burgos mayoralty election
Party	Candidate	Votes	%
NPC	Ruben Uy Diokno	6,865	51.37
PFP	Nemcy Avellaneda	6,330	47.37
PM	Nora Hernandez	169	1.26
Margin of victory		535	
Invalid or blank votes		859	
Total votes		13,364	
NPC hold			

==== Pitogo ====
Incumbent mayor Dexter Sayat is running for reelection. His opponent is Dennis Gliane.

Pitogo mayoralty election
Party	Candidate	Votes	%
Stan Q	Dexter Sayat	9,852	65.33
Independent	Dennis Gliane	5,228	34.67
Margin of victory		4,624	
Invalid or blank votes		259	
Total votes		15,080	100
Stan Q hold			

==== San Andres ====
San Andres mayoralty election
Party	Candidate	Votes	%
Stan Q	Ralph Edward B. Lim	14,180	89.03
Lakas	Paterno Arrabis, Jr.	1,747	10.97
Margin of victory		12,433	
Invalid or blank votes		898	
Total votes		15,927	100
Stan Q gain from PDP–Laban			

==== San Francisco ====
San Francisco mayoralty election
Party	Candidate	Votes	%
NPC	Litoy Alega	15,567	45.24
Lakas	Nani Tan	10,171	29.56
Stan Q	Kresna Fernandez	8,675	25.21
Margin of victory		5,396	
Invalid or blank votes		964	
Total votes		34,413	100
NPC gain from Nacionalista			

==== San Narciso ====
Incumbent mayor Pobel Uy-Yap is term-limited.

San Narciso mayoralty election
Party	Candidate	Votes	%
NUP	Allan Yap	14,993	54.76
Aksyon	Vicvic Reyes	12,384	45.24
Margin of victory		2,609	
Invalid or blank votes		454	
Total votes		27,377	100
NUP gain from PRP			

==== Unisan ====
Incumbent mayor Ferdinand Adulta is running for reelection.

Unisan mayoralty election
Party	Candidate	Votes	%
PRP	Omar Veluz	9,251	56.10
Stan Q	Ferdinand Adulta	7,209	43.71
Independent	Rolando Merano	31	.19
Margin of victory		2,042	
Invalid or blank votes		395	
Total votes		16,491	100
PRP gain from Stan Q			

=== 4th District ===
Incumbent mayor Jose Ramil Arquiza is running for reelection.

- Municipalities: Alabat, Atimonan, Calauag, Guinayangan, Gumaca, Lopez, Perez, Plaridel, Quezon, Tagkawayan

==== Alabat ====
Alabat mayoralty election
Party	Candidate	Votes	%
UNA	Ays Avellano-Canimo	5,536	55.83
NPC	Jose Ramil Arquiza	4,379	44.17
Margin of victory		1,157	
Invalid or blank votes		250	
Total votes		9,915	100
UNA gain from NPC			

==== Atimonan ====
Incumbent mayor Rustico Joven Mendoza is term-limited.

Atimonan mayoralty election
Party	Candidate	Votes	%
Nacionalista	Atty. Elvis Uy	13,872	44.83
PRP	Derick Magbuhos	9,365	30.26
PFP	Antonio Diestro	4,255	13.75
WPP	Elmer Escosia	1,383	4.47
UNA	Lala Lim	1,313	4.24
Lakas	Dhoray Tan	757	2.45
Margin of victory		4,507	
Invalid or blank votes		958	
Total votes		30,945	100
Nacionalista hold			

==== Calauag ====
Calauag's Rosalina Visorde is approaching her third and final term as Mayor of Calauag.

Calauag mayoralty election
Party	Candidate	Votes	%
Stan Q	Rosalina Visorde	28,170	83.41
Independent	Froilan Chua	3,972	11.74
Independent	Armando Mendoza	1,632	4.83
Margin of victory		24,198	
Invalid or blank votes		2,765	
Total votes		33,774	100
Stan Q hold			

==== Guinayangan ====
Guinayangan mayoralty election
Party	Candidate	Votes	%
Stan Q	Cesar Isaac III	17,097	100
Invalid or blank votes		2,804	
Total votes		18,129	100
Stan Q hold			

==== Gumaca ====
Incumbent mayor Webster Letargo is running for reelection. His opponent is Councilor Rainier Oliveros.

Gumaca mayoralty election
Party	Candidate	Votes	%
Nacionalista	Webster Letargo	21,795	60.96
Stan Q	Rainier Oliveros	13,959	39.04
Margin of victory		7,836	21.92
Invalid or blank votes		1,016	2.27
Total votes		44,765	100
Nacionalista hold			

==== Lopez ====
Incumbent mayor Rachel Ubaña is term-limited. Incumbent board member Sonny Ubana is running.

Lopez mayoralty election
Party	Candidate	Votes	%
Stan Q	Sonny Ubana	31,296	72.24
Independent	Arcie Malite	11,084	25.58
Independent	Amboy Javalera	649	1.50
Independent	Tonton Meriado	294	.68
Margin of victory		20,212	
Invalid or blank votes		3,607	
Total votes		43,323	100
Stan Q hold			

==== Perez ====
Perez mayoralty election
Party	Candidate	Votes	%
Stan Q	Cha Escalona	5,266	62.56
Lakas	Ping Reyes	3,152	37.44
Margin of victory		2,114	
Invalid or blank votes		254	
Total votes		8,418	100
Stan Q hold			

==== Plaridel ====
Plaridel mayoralty election
Party	Candidate	Votes	%
Stan Q	Jose Saavedra	3,147	42.71
Independent	Rodolfo Magbuhos	4,222	57.29
Margin of victory		1,075	
Invalid or blank votes		150	
Total votes		7,369	100
Stan Q hold			

==== Quezon ====
Quezon mayoralty election
Party	Candidate	Votes	%
Stan Q	Juan Escolano	5,845	61.05
PRP	Crispin Clacio	3,188	33.30
Independent	Joseph Bayan	541	5.65
Margin of victory		2,657	
Invalid or blank votes		307	
Total votes		9,574	100
Stan Q hold			

==== Tagkawayan ====
Incumbent mayor Carlo Eleazar is running unopposed.

Tagkawayan mayoralty election
Party	Candidate	Votes	%
Stan Q	Carlo Eleazar	21,295	100
Invalid or blank votes		6,028	
Total votes		21,295	100
Stan Q hold			
