= Angelina Tan =

Filipino politician (born 1971)

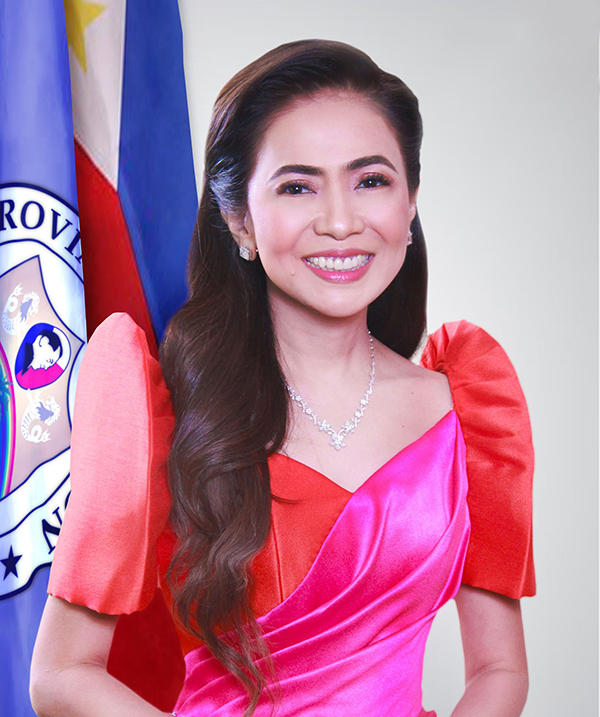
- Official portrait, 2023

31st Governor of Quezon
- Incumbent
- Assumed office June 30, 2022
- Vice Governor: Anacleto Alcala III
- Preceded by: Danilo Suarez

Member of the Philippine House of Representatives from Quezon's 4th district
- In office June 30, 2013 – June 30, 2022
- Preceded by: Erin Tañada
- Succeeded by: Mike Tan

Chairwoman of the House Committee on Health
- In office October 13, 2020 – June 30, 2022
- Preceded by: Lucille Nava
- Succeeded by: Ciriaco Gato Jr.
- In office July 22, 2019 – October 6, 2020
- Preceded by: Herself
- Succeeded by: Ma. Lucille Nava
- In office August 2, 2016 – June 30, 2019
- Preceded by: Eufemio Eriguel
- Succeeded by: Herself

Personal details
- Born: Angelina Beredo de Luna; October 1, 1971 (age 55) Rosario, Batangas, Philippines
- Party: NPC (2016–present); Stan Q (local party; 2024–present)
- Other political affiliations: UNA (2012–2016)
- Spouse: Ronnel Tan (m. 1991)
- Children: 3 (including Mike)
- Education: Medical Center Lucena Educational Institute (BS); Fatima Medical Science Foundation Inc. (MD) Ateneo de Manila University (MBA)
- Occupation: Politician; physician

Angelina "Helen" Beredo de Luna-Tan (born October 1, 1971) is a Filipino physician and politician who has served as the 31st governor of Quezon since 2022. She is the first woman to hold the office. Before becoming governor, she served as the representative of Quezon's fourth district from 2013 to 2022.

== Education ==
In her early education, she graduated junior high school in the Basic Education Department of Manuel S. Enverga University Foundation, Lucena City in 1989. Tan earned her Bachelor of Science in Nursing at the Calayan Educational Foundation, Inc. (CEFI) (formerly known as Medical Center Lucena Educational Institute) in 1997, Doctor of Medicine at the Fatima Medical Science Foundation Inc., and Master’s in Business Administration in Health from the Graduate School of Business of the Ateneo de Manila University.

== House of Representatives (2013–2022) ==
Tan ran in Quezon's 4th congressional district in 2013 under United Nationalist Alliance and won. She was re-elected in 2016 and in 2019, then under Nationalist People's Coalition. During her tenure as a congresswoman, Tan filed notable bills such as Comprehensive Tuberculosis Elimination Plan Act, Physician Act, Mandatory PhilHealth Coverage for All Senior Citizens, and the House Bill No. 6633. In 2019, she became the chairman of the House of Representatives' House Committee on Health. Not long after, Tan was removed from the chairmanship, being replaced by Guimaras representative Ma. Lucille Nava. Tan was able to regain the chairmanship as she was elected again to be the committee chair. Tan has led the passage of notable bills as a chairman such as the Universal Health Care Law and the ratification of Tobacco Excise Tax.

== Governor of Quezon (2022–present) ==
Tan ran for governor of Quezon in 2022, challenging incumbent Danilo Suarez, who was seeking re-election. She had Lucena councilor Anacleto Alcala III as her running mate for vice governor. She won with around 790,534 votes over Suarez's 320,296 votes. Tan became the first woman to hold the post.

In 2024, Tan founded the Stand Up Quezon (Stan Q) local political party. She would later run for re-election under the party in 2025 unopposed.

== Personal life ==
Tan is married to Ronnel Tan, an engineer and regional director for the Department of Public Works and Highways, and together, they have three children and two grandchildren. Their sons Keith Mikhal ("Kim") and Keith Micah ("Mike") are also in politics. Kim is a member of the Quezon Provincial Board from the 2nd district since 2025, while Mike serves as representative for Quezon's 4th congressional district since 2022, succeeding her.

== Electoral history ==
Electoral history of Angelina Tan
Year	Office	Party		Votes received				Result
Year	Office	Local	National	Total	%	P.	Swing	Result
2013	Representative (Quezon–4th)	—N/a	UNA	53,403	44.07%	1st	—N/a	Won
2016	Representative (Quezon–4th)	—N/a	NPC	129,772	70.20%	1st	+26.13	Won
2019	Representative (Quezon–4th)	—N/a	NPC	178,766	100.00%	1st	+29.80	Unopposed
2022	Governor of Quezon	—N/a	NPC	790,739	68.89%	1st	—N/a	Won
2025	Governor of Quezon	Stan Q	NPC	1,011,465	100.00%	1st	+31.11	Unopposed

House of Representatives of the Philippines
Preceded by Erin Tañada	Member of the House of Representatives from Quezon's 4th district 2013–2022	Succeeded by Keith Micah Tan
Political offices
Preceded by Danilo Suarez	Governor of Quezon; 2022–present	Incumbent
