= Quezon Provincial Board =

Legislative body of the province of Quezon, Philippines

Quezon Provincial Board Sangguniang Panlalawigan ng Quezon
- 19th Legislature

Type
- Type: Unicameral
- Term limits: 3 terms (9 years)

Leadership
- Presiding Officer: Anacleto Alcala III, Stan Q since June 30, 2022

Structure
- Seats: 14 board members 1 ex officio presiding officer
- Political groups: Stan Q (9); Lakas (1); Nonpartisan (3)
- Length of term: 3 years
- Authority: Local Government Code of the Philippines

Elections
- Voting system: Multiple non-transferable vote (regular members); Indirect election (ex officio members)
- Last election: May 12, 2025
- Next election: May 8, 2028

Meeting place
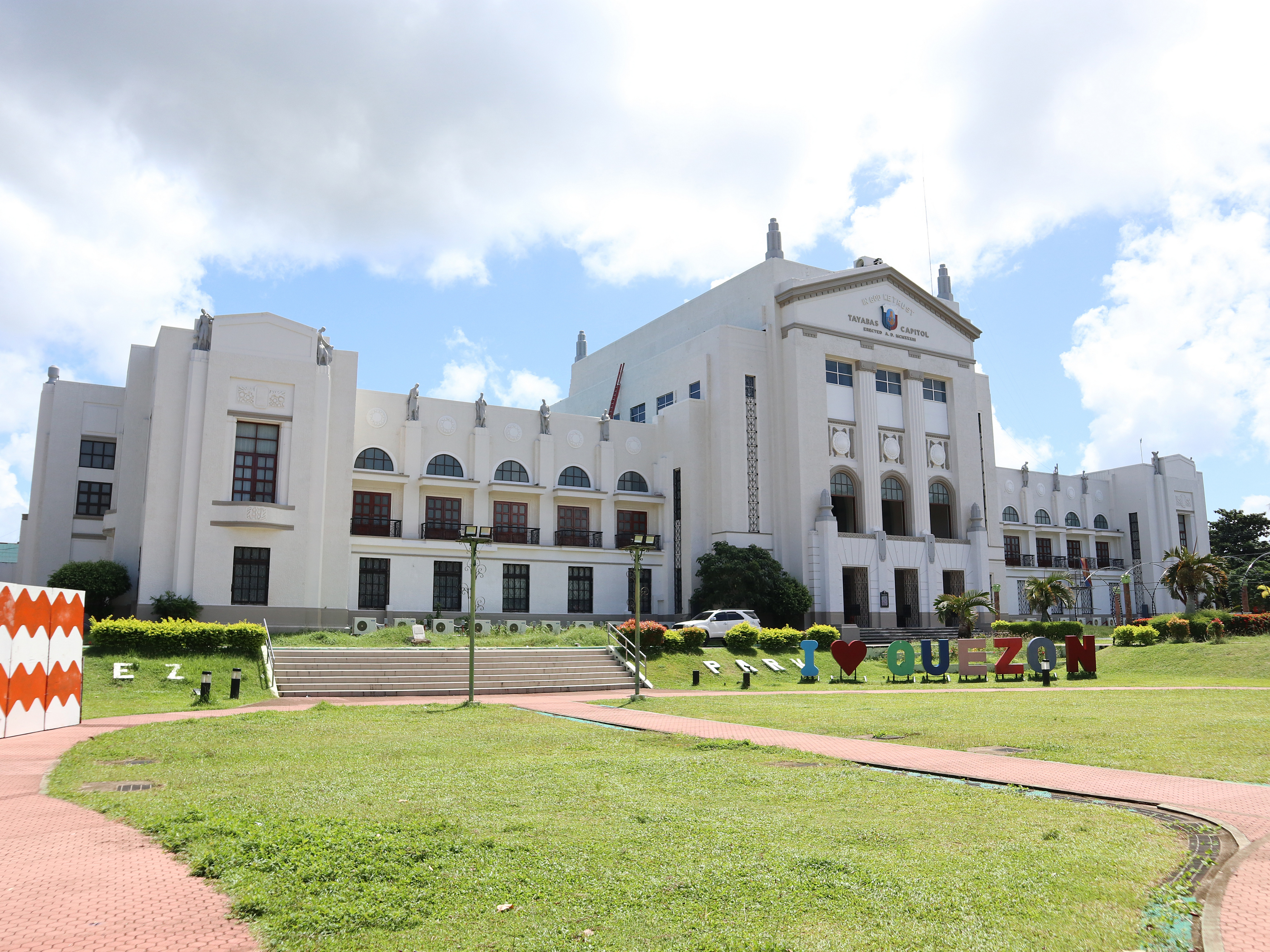
- Governor's Mansion Compound; Tayabas Capitol; Lucena

Website
- sp.quezon.gov.ph

The Quezon Provincial Board is the Sangguniang Panlalawigan (provincial legislature) of the Philippine province of Quezon.

The members are elected via plurality-at-large voting: the province is divided into four districts, the first and third districts sending two members each, and the second and fourth districts sending three members each to the provincial board; the number of candidates the electorate votes for and the number of winning candidates depends on the number of members their district sends. The vice governor is the ex officio presiding officer, and only votes to break ties. The vice governor is elected via the plurality voting system province-wide.

The districts used in appropriation of members is coextensive with the legislative districts of Quezon, with the exception that Lucena, an independent component city, is excluded in the second district.

Aside from the regular members, the board also includes the provincial federation presidents of the Liga ng mga Barangay (ABC, from its old name "Association of Barangay Captains"), the Sangguniang Kabataan (SK, youth councils), the Philippine Councilors League (PCL) and Indigenous People's (IP) Representative.

== Apportionment ==
Elections	Seats per district				Ex officio seats	Total seats
Elections	1st	2nd	3rd	4th	Ex officio seats	Total seats
2010–present	2	3	2	3	4	14

== List of members ==
=== 20th Legislature (2025-2028) ===
These are the members after the 2025 Quezon provincial elections and 2024 barangay and SK elections for the incoming 20th Legislature:

- Vice Governor and Presiding Officer of the Provincial Board: Anacleto Alcala III (Stan Q)

Seat	Board member	Party	Start of term	End of term
1st district	Julius Jay Luces	Stan Q	June 30, 2022	June 30, 2028
1st district	Samuel Nantes	Lakas	June 30, 2025	June 30, 2028
2nd district	Keith Mikhal D.L. Tan, MD	Stan Q	June 30, 2025	June 30, 2028
2nd district	Vinnette Alcala-Naca	Stan Q	June 30, 2025	June 30, 2028
2nd district	Maria Yllana Liwanag-Asistio	Stan Q	June 30, 2022	June 30, 2028
3rd district	Meg Esguerra	Stan Q	June 30, 2025	June 30, 2028
3rd district	John Joseph Aquivido	Stan Q	June 30, 2022	June 30, 2028
4th district	Rachel Ubana	Stan Q	June 30, 2025	June 30, 2028
4th district	Harold Butardo	Stan Q	June 30, 2022	June 30, 2028
4th district	Angelo Eduarte	Stan Q	June 30, 2025	June 30, 2028
ABC	Jaime C. Nicholas	Nonpartisan	June 30, 2019	January 1, 2023
PCL	Aileen Malabanan-Dellosa			
SK	Jackelyn D. Delimos	Nonpartisan		
IPMR	Thelma P. Aumentado	Nonpartisan		

=== Membership Summary ===
Election year	VG	ABC	PCL	SK	IP	1.1	1.2	2.3	2.4	2.5	3.6	3.7	4.8	4.9	4.10	Controlling party
2010																
2013																
2016																
2019																
2022																
2025																

== Presiding Officer ==
Vice Governors acts as the Presiding Officer of the Sangguniang Panlalawigan. Unlike British Parliament, the Presiding Officer is a partisan position. This position also breaks the tie when difference arises. The position is currently held by Anacleto A. Alcala III of Stan Q Political Party since 2022.

Election year	Name	Party
1988	Robert P. Racelis	PDP-Laban
1992	Robert P. Racelis	PDP-Laban
1995	Robert P. Racelis	PDP-Laban
1995	Edelyn A. Loo	NA
1995	Robert P. Racelis	PDP-Laban
1995	Claro Y. Talaga Jr.	Lakas
1998	Jovito E. Talabong	Lakas
2001	Jovito E. Talabong	Lakas
2004	David C. Suarez	KAMPI
2007	Carlos L. Portes	Liberal
2007	Lourdes C. De Luna-Pasatiempo	Lakas-Kampi-CMD
2010	Vicente J. Alcala	Liberal
2013	Samuel B. Nantes	Liberal
2016	Samuel B. Nantes	Liberal
2019	Samuel B. Nantes	Liberal
2022	Anacleto A. Alcala III	NPC
2025	Anacleto A. Alcala III	Stan Q

== Previous Legislators ==
=== 19th Legislature (2022-2025) ===
These are the members after the 2022 local elections and 2018 barangay and SK elections for the 19th Legislature:

- Vice Governor and Presiding Officer of the Provincial Board: Anacleto Alcala III (NPC)

District/ League	Board member	Party	Start of term	End of term	City/Municipality
1st	Claro M. Talaga Jr.	NPC	June 30, 2022	June 30, 2025	Tayabas
1st	Julius Jay Luces	NPC	June 30, 2022	June 30, 2025	
2nd	Vinnette Alcala-Naca	NPC	June 30, 2022	June 30, 2025	Lucena
2nd	Maria Yllana Liwanag-Asistio	Nacionalista	June 30, 2022	June 30, 2025	Lucena
2nd	Ferdinand Talabong	Nacionalista	June 30, 2022	June 1, 2024	Lucena
2nd	Vacant (Note: Ferdinand Talabong died on June 1, 2024.)		June 1, 2024	June 30, 2025	
3rd	Donaldo C. Suarez	NUP	June 30, 2022	June 30, 2025	
3rd	John Joseph Aquivido	NPC	June 30, 2022	June 30, 2025	
4th	Isaias Ubana II	NPC	June 30, 2022	June 30, 2025	Lopez
4th	Harold Butardo	NPC	June 30, 2022	June 30, 2025	Guinayangan
4th	Roderick Magbuhos	NPC	June 30, 2022	June 30, 2025	Atimonan
ABC	Ireneo Boongaling	Nonpartisan	June 30, 2019	January 1, 2023	
PCL	Angelo Eduarte	NPC	August 8, 2022	January 1, 2025	Calauag
SK	Iris H. Armando	Nonpartisan	June 8, 2018	January 1, 2023	
SK	Jackelyn D. Delimos	Nonpartisan	January 2, 2023	June 30, 2025	
IP	Thelma P. Aumentado	Nonpartisan			

=== 18th Legislature (2019-2022) ===
District/ League	Board member	Party	City/Municipality
1st	Alona Obispo	Lakas	
1st	Jerry Talaga	Nacionalista	
2nd	Maria Yllana Liwanag	Nacionalista	
2nd	Romano Talaga	Nacionalista	
2nd	Elizabeth Sio	PDP–Laban	Lucena
3rd	Jet Suarez	Nacionalista	
3rd	Reynante Arrogancia	Independent	Mulanay
4th	Isaias Ubana II	NPC	Lopez
4th	Dhoray Rhodora Tan	Nacionalista	Gumaca
4th	Derick Magbuhos	NPC	Atimonan
ABC	TBD	Nonpartisan	
PCL			
SK		Nonpartisan	
IP		Nonpartisan	

=== 17th Legislature (2016-2019) ===
District/ League	Board member	Party	City/Municipality
1st	Jerry Talaga	NUP	
1st	Aileen Buan	Liberal	
2nd	Elizabeth Sio	Liberal	
2nd	Bong Talabong	NUP	
2nd	Hermilando Alcala	Liberal	
3rd	Donaldo Suarez	UNA	
3rd	Dominic Reyes	Nacionalista	
4th	Isaias Ubana II	NUP	Lopez
4th	Rhodora Tan	Liberal	Gumaca
4th	Raquel Mendoza	NUP	Gumaca
ABC		Nonpartisan	
PCL			
SK		Nonpartisan	
IP		Nonpartisan	

=== 16th Legislature (2013-2016) ===
District/ League	Board member	Party	
1st	Teresita Dator	NUP	
1st	Alona Obispo	Liberal	
2nd	Gary Estrada	PMP	
2nd	Bong Talabong	NUP	
2nd	Elizabeth Sio	Liberal	Lucena
3rd	Bunso de Luna	NUP	
3rd	Vic Reyes	Nacionalista	
4th	Manuel Butardo	NUP	Guinayangan
4th	Rhodora Tan	Liberal	Gumaca
4th	Rachel Ubana	UNA	Lopez
ABC		Nonpartisan	
PCL			
SK		Nonpartisan	
IP		Nonpartisan	

=== 15th Legislature (2010-2013) ===
District/ League	Board member	Party	City/Municipality
1st	Teresita Dator	Liberal	Lucban
1st	Alona Villamayor-Obispo	Liberal	
2nd	Romano Talaga	PDP-Laban	Lucena
2nd	Gary Estrada	Liberal	
2nd	Ferdinand Talabong	Liberal	Lucena
3rd	Lourdes de Luna-Pasatiempo	Lakas-Kampi-CMD	
3rd	Victor Reyes	Nacionalista	
4th	Manuel Butardo	Liberal	Guinayangan
4th	Gerald Ortiz	Liberal	Atimonan
4th	Rachel Ubana	Liberal	Lopez
ABC		Nonpartisan	
PCL			
SK		Nonpartisan	
IP		Nonpartisan	

=== 7th Legislature (1980-1986) ===
Removed from office. All elected officials were replaced by an Officer in Charge.

=== 6th Legislature (1971-1975) ===
Martial Law was declared. Removed from office on September 23, 1972.

=== 3rd Legislature (1959-1963) ===
First Vice Governor of Quezon, Eladio Caliwara was elected.
