= Keith Micah Tan =

Member of the Philippine House of Representatives since 2022

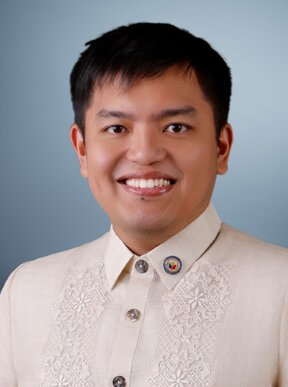
- Official portrait, 2026

Member of Philippine House of Representatives from Quezon's 4th congressional district
- Incumbent
- Assumed office June 30, 2022
- Preceded by: Angelina Tan

Personal details
- Born: Keith Micah de Luna Tan; March 1, 1995 (age 31) Lucena, Quezon, Philippines
- Party: NPC (2021–present); Stan Q (local party; 2024–present)
- Parents: Ronnel Tan (father); Angelina Tan (mother)
- Education: San Beda College
- Occupation: Politician

Keith Micah de Luna Tan (born March 1, 1995), also known as Mike Tan or Atorni Mike, is a Filipino politician and lawyer. He is a member of the Philippine House of Representatives from Quezon's 4th District since June 30, 2022. He succeeded his mother Angelina Tan, who was elected Governor of Quezon in 2022.

== Electoral Performance ==
=== 2025 ===
2025 Philippine House of Representatives election at Quezon's 4th district
Party	Candidate	Votes	%
NPC	Keith Micah Tan	199,930	100
Rejected ballots		36,705	11.57
Turnout		317,255	79.21
Registered electors		298,748	
NPC hold			
Source: Commission on Elections

=== 2022 ===
Candidate	Party	Votes	%
Mike Tan	NPC	166,591	72.89
Adhoray Tan	Lakas–CMD	43,862	19.19
Fer Martinez	NUP	12,193	5.34
Dhoray Legaspi	WPP	2,705	1.18
Jun Tierra	Independent	2,191	0.96
Andoy Martinez	PRP	1,003	0.44
Total		228,545	100.00
Source: "2022 NLE". COMELEC.

House of Representatives of the Philippines
Preceded by Angelina Tan	Member of the House of Representatives from Quezon's 4th district 2022–present	Incumbent
