= Stand Up Quezon =

Filipino political party based in Quezon Province

- Abbreviation: Stan Q
- Leader: Angelina Tan
- Founder: Angelina Tan
- Founded: July 8, 2024
- Headquarters: Quezon
- Ideology: Localism
- National affiliation: NPC
- Colors: Orange
- Quezon Provincial Board: 9 / 13
- House of Representatives: 3 / 4 (Quezon seats only)

The Stand Up Quezon (Stan Q; Solidarity for Transformation, Advancement and Nationalism towards a Dynamic, United and Progressive Quezon Province), is a Quezon-based local political organization. It is currently led by its founder incumbent Governor Angelina Tan.

== History ==
Stan Q was founded in July 8, 2024 by Angelina "Helen" Tan to prepare for the 2025 Provincial elections, started with signing of coalition agreement with the Nationalist People's Coalition (NPC). In the time of the coalition agreement signed, 226 of 430 local officials joined the party ranks. Some of its congressional candidates including her incumbent son Keith, and representative Jayjay Suarez are unopposed. Tan and many of the candidates including Keith Tan and Suarez won the elections.

== Electoral performance ==
=== Gubernatorial and Vice Gubernatorial elections ===
Year	Gubernatorial election				Vice Gubernatorial election			
Year	Candidate	Votes	Vote share	Result	Candidate	Votes	Vote share	Result
2025	Angelina Tan	1,011,465	100%	Won	Anacleto Alcala III	851,518	94.16%	Won

=== Legislative elections ===
Provincial Board			House of Representatives districts from Quezon		
Year	Seats won	Result	Year	Seats won	Result
2025 (Note: All of the candidates were Stand Q in the ballots.)	9 / 13	Won	2025 (Note: Some of the members is named with a national party in the ballot)	3 / 4	Split
