= 2008 Quezon del Sur creation plebiscite =

- December 13, 2008

Results
Choice	Votes	%
Yes	157,457	43.41%
No	205,265	56.59%
Valid votes	362,722	99.53%
Invalid or blank votes	1,705	0.47%
Total votes	364,427	100.00%
Registered voters/turnout	957,199	38.07%
- Results by municipalities, cities, congressional districts, and proposed provinces.

The Quezon del Sur creation plebiscite was a plebiscite on the creation of the province of Quezon del Sur from Quezon; the original Quezon province would have been renamed to "Quezon del Norte" had the plebiscite been approved by the residents of Quezon. The plebiscite was held on December 13, 2008, and the result was a slight majority rejecting the creation of the province.

Gumaca would have been the capital of Quezon del Sur, while Lucena would have been retained as Quezon del Norte's capital. Both provinces would have remained part of Calabarzon under their original acronym "zon".

== Referendum question ==
The Quezon del Sur creation plebiscite was supervised and officiated by the COMELEC pursuant to Resolution No. 8553.

The question of the said plebiscite was:

DO YOU APPROVE OF THE CREATION OF THE PROVINCE OF QUEZON DEL SUR, WHICH SHALL BE COMPOSED OF THE MUNICIPALITIES OF AGDANGAN, BUENAVISTA, CATANAUAN, GENERAL LUNA, MACALELON, MULANAY, PADRE BURGOS, PITOGO, SAN ANDRES, SAN FRANCISCO, SAN NARCISO, UNISAN, ALABAT, ATIMONAN, CALAUAG, GUINAYANGAN, GUMACA, LOPEZ, PEREZ, PLARIDEL, QUEZON AND TAGKAWAYAN, AND THE RENAMING OF THE MOTHER PROVINCE OF QUEZON INTO QUEZON DEL NORTE, WHICH SHALL BE COMPOSED OF THE MUNICIPALITIES OF BURDEOS, GENERAL NAKAR, INFANTA, JOMALIG, LUCBAN, MAUBAN, PAGBILAO, PANUKULAN, PATNANUNGAN, POLILLO, REAL, SAMPALOC, TAYABAS CITY, CANDELARIA, DOLORES, SAN ANTONIO, SARIAYA, TIAONG AND LUCENA CITY, PURSUANT TO REPUBLIC ACT NO. 9495 DATED SEPTEMBER 7, 2007?

== Background ==
In 2007, Quezon was proposed to be split into Quezon del Norte and Quezon del Sur. Quezon del Norte was to be composed of the first and second congressional districts of the province (Burdeos, General Nakar, Infanta, Jomalig, Lucban, Mauban, Pagbilao, Panukulan, Patnanungan, Polillo, Real, Sampaloc, Tayabas, Candelaria, Dolores, San Antonio, Sariaya, Tiaong and Lucena City), with Lucena City as its capital. Quezon del Sur, with its capital at Gumaca, would have been composed of the third and fourth congressional districts (Agdangan, Buenavista, Catanauan, General Luna, Macalelon, Mulanay, Padre Burgos, Pitogo, San Andres, San Francisco, San Narciso, Unisan, Alabat, Atimonan, Calauag, Guinayangan, Gumaca, Lopez, Perez, Plaridel, Quezon and Tagkawayan). Republic Act No. 9495, the law stipulating the division, lapsed into law without the signature of President Gloria Macapagal Arroyo on September 7, 2007.

As required by law, the COMELEC held a plebiscite on December 13, 2008, 60 days after Republic Act No. 9495 took effect. Governor Rafael Nantes, one of the original authors of the law, and Vice Governor Kelly Portes opposed the division of the province. Quezon Provincial Board member Sonny Pulgar and businessman Hobart Dator Jr. launched the "Save Quezon Province Movement." The Comelec allotted ₱50 million for the plebiscite. Academician Prof. Joseph Jadway "JJ" Marasigan provided what he called the "strong theoretical framework" that deemed the said split as a step backward. He instead called for the professionalization of service institutions and the differentiation of functions as the answer to the province's increasingly becoming complex environment. He organized students and fellow academicians to oppose such move. His participation resulted in a grave misunderstanding with Lucena Catholic Bishop Emilio Marquez who strongly supported the idea of splitting the province. Marasigan maintained that bishops have no business in dealing with entirely political matters and should refrain from using their influence over their flock. Nantes later softened his stand against the proposed creation of Quezon del Sur. Accordingly, upon request of Comelec Chair Jose Melo, a ₱38 million "Special Allotment Release Order" was issued by the Department of Budget and Management to the Commission on Elections (Philippines) to fund the holding of the plebiscite.

On November 17, 2008, Save Quezon Province Movement (SQPM) asked the Supreme Court of the Philippines to declare Republic Act No. 9495 as unconstitutional, and to restrain the implementation of a November 12 COMELEC Resolutions Nos. 8533, 8534, 8535, 8537, 8538 and 8539, setting the plebiscite. Yet the plebiscite proceeded with the majority of votes rejecting the division, therefore the split did not push through.

== Results ==
=== Summary ===
Plebiscite for the approval of Republic Act 9495
Choice	Votes	%
For	157,457	43.41
Against	205,265	56.59
Required majority		50.00
Total	362,722	100.00
Valid votes	362,722	99.53
Invalid/blank votes	1,705	0.47
Total votes	364,427	100.00
Registered voters/turnout	957,199	38.07
Source: COMELEC report

=== By administrative division ===
Administrative division	Yes		No		Total
Administrative division	Total	%	Total	%	Total
Agdangan	1,150	38.18	1,862	61.82	3,012
Alabat	1,610	39.50	2,466	60.50	4,076
Atimonan	2,593	22.14	9,121	77.86	11,714
Buenavista	4,067	55.88	3,211	44.12	7,278
Burdeos	382	12.65	2,637	87.35	3,019
Calauag	6,851	50.28	6,776	49.72	13,627
Candelaria	3,463	24.99	10,394	75.01	13,857
Catanauan	10,126	65.32	5,376	34.68	15,502
Dolores	798	21.04	2,995	78.96	3,793
General Luna	4,203	71.35	1,688	28.65	5,891
General Nakar	1,679	32.80	3,440	67.20	5,119
Guinayangan	6,474	75.41	2,111	24.59	8,585
Gumaca	12,524	84.86	2,235	15.14	14,759
Infanta	2,849	24.80	8,641	75.20	11,490
Jomalig	255	34.65	481	65.35	736
Lopez	10,940	61.35	6,892	38.65	17,832
Lucban	2,735	33.77	5,364	66.23	8,099
Lucena	14,635	37.47	24,423	62.53	39,058
Macalelon	3,363	50.57	3,287	49.43	6,650
Mauban	1,085	9.17	10,751	90.83	11,836
Mulanay	4,129	39.44	6,341	60.56	10,470
Padre Burgos	2,339	45.99	2,747	54.01	5,086
Pagbilao	5,301	42.61	7,141	57.39	12,442
Panukulan	724	30.18	1,675	69.82	2,399
Patnanungan	336	16.29	1,727	83.71	2,063
Perez	1,083	34.66	2,042	65.34	3,125
Pitogo	4,353	72.71	1,634	27.29	5,987
Plaridel	1,601	61.32	1,010	38.68	2,611
Polillo	737	13.96	4,541	86.04	5,278
Quezon	2,136	54.16	1,808	45.84	3,944
Real	1,950	31.20	4,301	68.80	6,251
Sampaloc	411	11.70	3,101	88.30	3,512
San Andres	2,866	62.84	1,695	37.16	4,561
San Antonio	867	14.06	5,300	85.94	6,167
San Francisco	5,754	51.91	5,330	48.09	11,084
San Narciso	4,646	52.18	4,258	47.82	8,904
Sariaya	4,713	35.65	8,507	64.35	13,220
Tagkawayan	5,510	54.92	4,522	45.08	10,032
Tayabas	5,517	36.55	9,578	63.45	15,095
Tiaong	5,573	33.22	11,205	66.78	16,778
Unisan	5,129	65.93	2,651	34.07	7,780
Quezon	157,457	43.41	205,265	56.59	362,722

Source: COMELEC

=== By proposed province ===
Proposed province	Yes		No		Total
Proposed province	Total	%	Total	%	Total
Quezon del Norte	54,010	29.97	126,202	70.03	180,212
Quezon del Sur	103,447	56.68	79,063	43.32	182,510
Quezon	157,457	43.41	205,265	56.59	362,722

=== By congressional district ===
Congressional districts	Yes		No		Total
Congressional districts	Total	%	Total	%	Total
1st district	23,961	27.43	63,378	72.57	87,339
2nd district	30,049	32.35	62,824	67.65	92,873
3rd district	52,125	56.53	40,080	43.47	92,205
4th district	51,322	56.83	38,983	43.17	90,305
Quezon	157,457	43.41	205,265	56.59	362,722

== See also ==
- 2021 Palawan division plebiscite, a plebiscite that rejected the proposed division of Palawan into three smaller provinces
- Sugbuak, a failed 2007 proposal to divide the province of Cebu into four smaller provinces
