= Polillo =

Polilio may refer to:

- Polillo Islands, an island group in Quezon Province, the Philippines
  - Polillo Island, the main island of the Polillo Island Group
    - Polillo, Quezon, a municipality on the island
- Polillo Strait, a strait of water separating the Polillo Islands from Luzon Island
