= Quezon's 1st congressional district =

Legislative district of the Philippines

- Constituency for the House of Representatives of the Philippines
- Boundary of Quezon's 1st congressional district in Quezon
- Location of Quezon within the Philippines
- Province: Quezon
- Region: Calabarzon
- Population: 573,895 (2020)
- Electorate: 377,065 (2025)
- Major settlements: 13 LGUs: Cities; Tayabas; Municipalities; Burdeos; General Nakar; Infanta; Jomalig; Lucban; Mauban; Pagbilao; Panukulan; Patnanungan; Polillo; Real; Sampaloc
- Area: 4,178.81 km^{2} (1,613.45 sq mi)

Current constituency
- Created: 1907
- Representative: Wilfrido Mark M. Enverga
- Political party: NPC; Stan Q
- Congressional bloc: Majority

Quezon's 1st congressional district is one of the four congressional districts of the Philippines in the province of Quezon, formerly Tayabas. It has been represented in the House of Representatives of the Philippines since 1916 and earlier in the Philippine Assembly from 1907 to 1916. The district consists of the city of Tayabas and adjacent municipalities of Burdeos, General Nakar, Infanta, Jomalig, Lucban, Mauban, Pagbilao, Panukulan, Patnanungan, Polillo, Real and Sampaloc. It also included the municipalities of Candelaria, Dolores, Lucena, San Antonio, Sariaya, and Tiaong, and the then-sub-province of Aurora until 1972, as well as the municipalities of Atimonan and Laguimanoc (now Padre Burgos) until they were reapportioned to the second district in 1922. It is currently represented in the 20th Congress by Wilfrido Mark M. Enverga of the Nationalist People's Coalition (NPC) and Stand Up Quezon (Stan Q).

== Representation history ==
#	Image	Member	Term of office		Legislature	Party	Electoral history	Constituent LGUs
#	Image	Member	Start	End	Legislature	Party	Electoral history	Constituent LGUs
=== Tayabas's 1st district for the Philippine Assembly ===
District created January 9, 1907.
1		Manuel L. Quezon	October 16, 1907	May 15, 1909	1st	Nacionalista	Elected in 1907. Resigned on appointment as Resident Commissioner.	1907–1912; Atimonan, Baler, Candelaria, Casiguran, Infanta, Lucban, Lucena, Mauban, Pagbilao, Polillo, Sampaloc, Sariaya, Tayabas, Tiaong
2		Filemón Pérez	October 16, 1909	October 16, 1916	2nd	Nacionalista	Elected in 1909.	1907–1912; Atimonan, Baler, Candelaria, Casiguran, Infanta, Lucban, Lucena, Mauban, Pagbilao, Polillo, Sampaloc, Sariaya, Tayabas, Tiaong
2		Filemón Pérez	October 16, 1909	October 16, 1916	3rd	Nacionalista	Re-elected in 1912.	1912–1916; Atimonan, Baler, Candelaria, Casiguran, Dolores, Infanta, Lucban, Lucena, Mauban, Pagbilao, Polillo, Sampaloc, Sariaya, Tayabas, Tiaong
=== Tayabas's 1st district for the House of Representatives of the Philippine Islands ===
3		Alfonso M. Recto	October 16, 1916	June 3, 1919	4th	Nacionalista	Elected in 1916.	1916–1919; Atimonan, Baler, Candelaria, Casiguran, Dolores, Infanta, Lucban, Lucena, Mauban, Pagbilao, Polillo, Sampaloc, Sariaya, Tayabas, Tiaong
4		Fabian R. Millar	June 3, 1919	June 6, 1922	5th	Nacionalista	Elected in 1919.	1919–1922; Atimonan, Baler, Candelaria, Dolores, Infanta, Laguimanoc, Lucban, Lucena, Mauban, Pagbilao, Polillo, Sampaloc, Sariaya, Tayabas, Tiaong
5		Agustín Álvarez	June 6, 1922	June 2, 1925	6th	Nacionalista; Colectivista	Elected in 1922.	1922–1935; Baler, Candelaria, Casiguran, Dolores, Infanta, Lucban, Lucena, Mauban, Pagbilao, Polillo, Sampaloc, Sariaya, Tayabas, Tiaong
6		Primitivo San Agustín	June 2, 1925	June 5, 1928	7th	Nacionalista; Consolidado	Elected in 1925.	1922–1935; Baler, Candelaria, Casiguran, Dolores, Infanta, Lucban, Lucena, Mauban, Pagbilao, Polillo, Sampaloc, Sariaya, Tayabas, Tiaong
(4)		Fabian R. Millar	June 5, 1928	June 5, 1934	8th	Nacionalista; Consolidado	Elected in 1928.	1922–1935; Baler, Candelaria, Casiguran, Dolores, Infanta, Lucban, Lucena, Mauban, Pagbilao, Polillo, Sampaloc, Sariaya, Tayabas, Tiaong
(4)		Fabian R. Millar	June 5, 1928	June 5, 1934	9th	Nacionalista; Consolidado	Re-elected in 1931.	1922–1935; Baler, Candelaria, Casiguran, Dolores, Infanta, Lucban, Lucena, Mauban, Pagbilao, Polillo, Sampaloc, Sariaya, Tayabas, Tiaong
7		José A. Angara	June 5, 1934	September 16, 1935	10th	Nacionalista; Democrático	Elected in 1934.	1922–1935; Baler, Candelaria, Casiguran, Dolores, Infanta, Lucban, Lucena, Mauban, Pagbilao, Polillo, Sampaloc, Sariaya, Tayabas, Tiaong
#	Image	Member	Term of office		National Assembly	Party	Electoral history	Constituent LGUs
#	Image	Member	Start	End	National Assembly	Party	Electoral history	Constituent LGUs
=== Tayabas's 1st district for the National Assembly (Commonwealth of the Philippines) ===
(7)		José A. Angara	September 16, 1935	November 29, 1937	1st	Nacionalista; Democrático	Re-elected in 1935. Died.	1935–1941; Baler, Candelaria, Casiguran, Dolores, Infanta, Lucban, Lucena, Mauban, Pagbilao, Polillo, Sampaloc, Sariaya, Tayabas, Tiaong
8		Miguel R. Castillo	December 30, 1938	December 30, 1941	2nd	Nacionalista	Elected in 1938.	1935–1941; Baler, Candelaria, Casiguran, Dolores, Infanta, Lucban, Lucena, Mauban, Pagbilao, Polillo, Sampaloc, Sariaya, Tayabas, Tiaong
District dissolved into the two-seat Tayabas's at-large district for the National Assembly (Second Philippine Republic).
#	Image	Member	Term of office		Common wealth Congress	Party	Electoral history	Constituent LGUs
#	Image	Member	Start	End	Common wealth Congress	Party	Electoral history	Constituent LGUs
=== Tayabas's 1st district for the House of Representatives of the Commonwealth of the Philippines ===
District re-created May 24, 1945.
9		Pedro Insúa	June 11, 1945	May 25, 1946	1st	Nacionalista	Elected in 1941.	1945–1946; Baler, Candelaria, Casiguran, Dolores, Infanta, Lucban, Lucena, Mauban, Pagbilao, Polillo, Sampaloc, Sariaya, Tayabas, Tiaong
#	Image	Member	Term of office		Congress	Party	Electoral history	Constituent LGUs
#	Image	Member	Start	End	Congress	Party	Electoral history	Constituent LGUs
=== Tayabas's 1st district for the House of Representatives of the Philippines ===
10		Fortunato N. Suarez	May 25, 1946	December 30, 1949	1st	Liberal	Elected in 1946.	1946–1949; Baler, Candelaria, Casiguran, Dolores, Infanta, Lucban, Lucena, Mauban, Pagbilao, Polillo, Sampaloc, Sariaya, Tayabas, Tiaong
=== Quezon's 1st district for the House of Representatives of the Philippines ===
11		Narciso H. Umali	December 30, 1949	December 30, 1953	2nd	Nacionalista	Elected in 1949.	1949–1953; Baler, Burdeos, Candelaria, Casiguran, Dolores, General Nakar, Infanta, Lucban, Lucena, Mauban, Pagbilao, Polillo, Sampaloc, Sariaya, Tayabas, Tiaong
12		Manuel S. Enverga	December 30, 1953	December 30, 1969	3rd	Nacionalista	Elected in 1953.	1953–1957; Baler, Burdeos, Candelaria, Casiguran, Dipaculao, Dolores, General Nakar, Infanta, Lucban, Lucena, Maria Aurora, Mauban, Pagbilao, Polillo, Sampaloc, Sariaya, Tayabas, Tiaong
12		Manuel S. Enverga	December 30, 1953	December 30, 1969	4th	Nacionalista	Re-elected in 1957.	1957–1961; Baler, Burdeos, Candelaria, Casiguran, Dipaculao, Dolores, General Nakar, Infanta, Lucban, Lucena, Maria Aurora, Mauban, Pagbilao, Polillo, Sampaloc, San Antonio, Sariaya, Tayabas, Tiaong
12		Manuel S. Enverga	December 30, 1953	December 30, 1969	5th	Nacionalista	Re-elected in 1961.	1961–1965; Baler, Burdeos, Candelaria, Casiguran, Dipaculao, Dolores, General Nakar, Infanta, Jomalig, Lucban, Lucena, Maria Aurora, Mauban, Pagbilao, Panukulan, Patnanungan, Polillo, Sampaloc, San Antonio, Sariaya, Tayabas, Tiaong
12		Manuel S. Enverga	December 30, 1953	December 30, 1969	6th	Nacionalista	Re-elected in 1965.	1965–1969; Baler, Burdeos, Candelaria, Casiguran, Dingalan, Dipaculao, Dolores, General Nakar, Infanta, Jomalig, Lucban, Lucena, Maria Aurora, Mauban, Pagbilao, Panukulan, Patnanungan, Polillo, Real, Sampaloc, San Antonio, San Luis, Sariaya, Tayabas, Tiaong
13		Moises A. Escueta	December 30, 1969	September 23, 1972	7th	Liberal	Elected in 1969. Removed from office after imposition of martial law.	1969–1972; Baler, Burdeos, Candelaria, Casiguran, Dilasag, Dinalungan, Dingalan, Dipaculao, Dolores, General Nakar, Infanta, Jomalig, Lucban, Lucena, Maria Aurora, Mauban, Pagbilao, Panukulan, Patnanungan, Polillo, Real, Sampaloc, San Antonio, San Luis, Sariaya, Tayabas, Tiaong
District dissolved into the twenty-seat Region IV-A's at-large district for the Interim Batasang Pambansa, followed by the four-seat Quezon's at-large district for the Regular Batasang Pambansa. Aurora seceded from Quezon on November 21, 1978.
District re-created February 2, 1987.
14		Wilfrido L. Enverga	June 30, 1987	June 30, 1998	8th	UNIDO	Elected in 1987.	1987–present Burdeos, General Nakar, Infanta, Jomalig, Lucban, Mauban, Pagbilao, Panukulan, Patnanungan, Polillo, Real, Sampaloc, Tayabas
14		Wilfrido L. Enverga	June 30, 1987	June 30, 1998	9th	LDP	Re-elected in 1992.	1987–present Burdeos, General Nakar, Infanta, Jomalig, Lucban, Mauban, Pagbilao, Panukulan, Patnanungan, Polillo, Real, Sampaloc, Tayabas
14		Wilfrido L. Enverga	June 30, 1987	June 30, 1998	10th	Lakas	Re-elected in 1995.	1987–present Burdeos, General Nakar, Infanta, Jomalig, Lucban, Mauban, Pagbilao, Panukulan, Patnanungan, Polillo, Real, Sampaloc, Tayabas
15		Rafael Nantes	June 30, 1998	June 30, 2007	11th	Reporma	Elected in 1998.	1987–present Burdeos, General Nakar, Infanta, Jomalig, Lucban, Mauban, Pagbilao, Panukulan, Patnanungan, Polillo, Real, Sampaloc, Tayabas
15		Rafael Nantes	June 30, 1998	June 30, 2007	12th	Liberal	Re-elected in 2001.	1987–present Burdeos, General Nakar, Infanta, Jomalig, Lucban, Mauban, Pagbilao, Panukulan, Patnanungan, Polillo, Real, Sampaloc, Tayabas
15		Rafael Nantes	June 30, 1998	June 30, 2007	13th	Liberal	Re-elected in 2004.	1987–present Burdeos, General Nakar, Infanta, Jomalig, Lucban, Mauban, Pagbilao, Panukulan, Patnanungan, Polillo, Real, Sampaloc, Tayabas
16		Wilfrido Mark M. Enverga	June 30, 2007	June 30, 2016	14th	KAMPI	Elected in 2007.	1987–present Burdeos, General Nakar, Infanta, Jomalig, Lucban, Mauban, Pagbilao, Panukulan, Patnanungan, Polillo, Real, Sampaloc, Tayabas
16		Wilfrido Mark M. Enverga	June 30, 2007	June 30, 2016	14th	Nacionalista	Elected in 2007.	1987–present Burdeos, General Nakar, Infanta, Jomalig, Lucban, Mauban, Pagbilao, Panukulan, Patnanungan, Polillo, Real, Sampaloc, Tayabas
16		Wilfrido Mark M. Enverga	June 30, 2007	June 30, 2016	15th	NPC	Re-elected in 2010.	1987–present Burdeos, General Nakar, Infanta, Jomalig, Lucban, Mauban, Pagbilao, Panukulan, Patnanungan, Polillo, Real, Sampaloc, Tayabas
16		Wilfrido Mark M. Enverga	June 30, 2007	June 30, 2016	16th	NPC	Re-elected in 2013.	1987–present Burdeos, General Nakar, Infanta, Jomalig, Lucban, Mauban, Pagbilao, Panukulan, Patnanungan, Polillo, Real, Sampaloc, Tayabas
17		Anna Katrina Enverga-de la Paz	June 30, 2016	June 30, 2019	17th	NPC	Elected in 2016.	1987–present Burdeos, General Nakar, Infanta, Jomalig, Lucban, Mauban, Pagbilao, Panukulan, Patnanungan, Polillo, Real, Sampaloc, Tayabas
(16)		Wilfrido Mark M. Enverga	June 30, 2019	Incumbent	18th	NPC	Elected in 2019.	1987–present Burdeos, General Nakar, Infanta, Jomalig, Lucban, Mauban, Pagbilao, Panukulan, Patnanungan, Polillo, Real, Sampaloc, Tayabas
(16)		Wilfrido Mark M. Enverga	June 30, 2019	Incumbent	19th	NPC	Re-elected in 2022.	1987–present Burdeos, General Nakar, Infanta, Jomalig, Lucban, Mauban, Pagbilao, Panukulan, Patnanungan, Polillo, Real, Sampaloc, Tayabas
(16)		Wilfrido Mark M. Enverga	June 30, 2019	Incumbent	20th	NPC (Stan Q)	Re-elected in 2025.	1987–present Burdeos, General Nakar, Infanta, Jomalig, Lucban, Mauban, Pagbilao, Panukulan, Patnanungan, Polillo, Real, Sampaloc, Tayabas

== Election results ==
=== 2025 ===
2025 Philippine House of Representatives election at Quezon's 1st district
Party	Candidate	Votes	%
NPC	Mark Enverga	252,236	100
Rejected ballots		65,019	20.49
Turnout		317,255	84.14
Registered electors		377,065	
NPC hold			
Source: Commission on Elections

=== 2022 ===
2022 Philippine House of Representatives elections
Party	Candidate	Votes	%
NPC	Mark Enverga	277,126	86.18
KBL	Teresita Dator	32,823	12.45
Independent	Francisco Rubio	2,613	0.99
Independent	Lamberto Cubilo	996	0.38
Total votes		313,558	100.00
NPC hold			

=== 2019 ===
2019 Philippine House of Representatives elections
Party	Candidate	Votes	%
NPC	Mark Enverga	179,831	100.00
Total votes		179,831	100.00
NPC hold			

=== 2016 ===
2016 Philippine House of Representatives elections
Party	Candidate	Votes	%
NPC	Trina Enverga	90,306	38.7
Liberal	Irvin Alcala	86,376	37.0
UNA	Teresita Dator	26,126	11.2
PDP–Laban	Carlos Portes	5,775	2.5
Invalid or blank votes		24,668	10.6
Total votes		233,251	100%
NPC hold			

=== 2013 ===
2013 Philippine House of Representatives elections
Party	Candidate	Votes	%
NPC	Wilfredo Mark Enverga	108,714	71.96
Aksyon	Pauline Anne Villaseñor	23,828	15.77
Margin of victory		84,886	56.19%
Invalid or blank votes		18,537	12.27
Total votes		151,079	100.00
NPC hold			

=== 2010 ===
2010 Philippine House of Representatives elections
Party	Candidate	Votes	%
Nacionalista	Wilfrido Mark Enverga	109,508	56.20
Lakas–Kampi	Agnes Devanadera	82,908	42.55
PGRP	Gregorio Cabigan	1,564	0.80
Independent	Rolando de Tena	861	0.44
Valid ballots		194,841	92.62
Invalid or blank votes		15,536	7.38
Total votes		210,377	100.00
Nacionalista hold			

=== 2007 ===
2007 Philippine House of Representatives elections
Party	Candidate	Votes	%
KAMPI	Wilfrido Mark Enverga	74,921	
Liberal	Fernando Llamas	45,322	
Lakas	Eladio Pasamba	31,392	
Valid ballots			
Invalid or blank votes			
Total votes			
KAMPI gain from Liberal			

== See also ==
- Legislative districts of Quezon
