= Panukulan =

Municipality in Quezon, Philippines

- Municipality
- Municipality of Panukulan
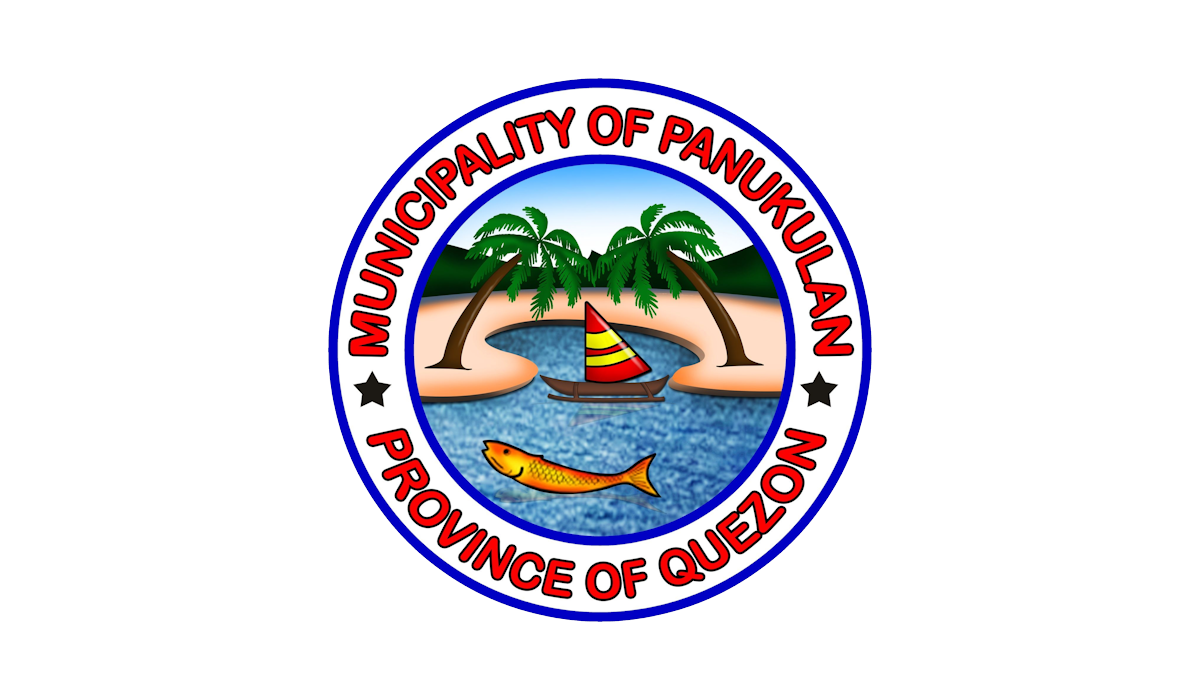
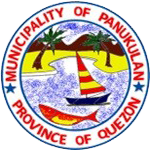
- Flag Seal

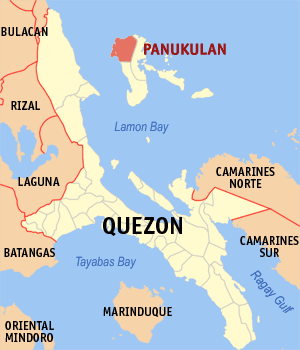
- Location of Panukulan in Quezon
- Interactive map of Panukulan
- Location within the Philippines
- Coordinates: 14°56′N 121°49′E
- Country: Philippines
- Region: Calabarzon
- Province: Quezon
- District: 1st district
- Founded: June 21, 1959
- Barangays: 13 (see Barangays)

Government
  - Type: Sangguniang Bayan
  - Mayor: Alfred Rigor S. Mitra
  - Vice Mayor: Keysean M. Peñamante - Nolledo
  - Representative: Wilfrido Mark M. Enverga
  - Municipal Council: Members: Jim M. Avellano; Dante S. Villamen; Jean Paul A. Rojo; Janice U. Peñamante - Tuzon; Mark Rannuel C. Gucilatar; Emman Q. Peñamante; Arven P. Prudente; Noeme V. Peñamante
  - Electorate: 11,952 voters (2025)

Area
  - Total: 226.61 km^{2} (87.49 sq mi)
- Elevation: 9.0 m (29.5 ft)
- Highest elevation: 165 m (541 ft)
- Lowest elevation: 0 m (0 ft)

Population (2024 census)
  - Total: 17,118
  - Density: 75.539/km^{2} (195.65/sq mi)
  - Households: 3,867
- Demonym(s): Panukulanin, Panukuleño

Economy
  - Income class: 3rd municipal income class
  - Poverty incidence: 12.52% (2023)
  - Revenue: ₱ 150.8 million (2024)
  - Assets: ₱ 534.7 million (2024)
  - Expenditure: ₱ 50.65 million (2024)
  - Liabilities: ₱ 252.4 million (2024)

Service provider
  - Electricity: Quezon 2 Electric Cooperative (QUEZELCO 2)
- Time zone: UTC+8 (PST)
- ZIP code: 4337
- PSGC: 0405631000
- IDD : area code: +63 (0)42
- Native languages: Tagalog
- Website: www.panukulan.gov.ph

Panukulan, officially the Municipality of Panukulan (Tagalog: Bayan ng Panukulan), is a municipality in the province of Quezon, Philippines. According to the 2024 census, it has a population of 17,118 people.

== History ==
Panukulan was established as a municipal district when barangays Panukulan, Calasumanga, Libo, and Lipata separated from the municipality of Polillo by virtue of Republic Act No. 2452 enacted on June 21, 1959.

== Geography ==
Panukulan is located in the northwestern part of the island of Polillo in the Polillo Islands which is 26 nautical miles (48 km; 30 mi) from Infanta, Quezon. It is geographically situated at 121°48.50′ longitude and 14°56′ latitude. It is bounded in the north by the Philippine Sea (Pacific Ocean), on the east by the municipality of Burdeos, Quezon, on the south by Polillo, Quezon, and on the west by Polillo Strait. Infanta, Quezon is its nearest commercial center. Its travel time by motor boat going to Infanta and vice-versa is about 1.5 hours to 2 hours, depending on the weather condition.

Only a single regular trip is available, which leaves the Municipal Port at 7:30 AM PHT and return from Infanta at 2:00 PM. All barangays are accessible through banca or motorboat. Only Barangay Balungay up to the boundary of Barangay Pag-itan can be reached through land transportation. However, there are also Tricycle Operators at Barangay Libo to Kinalagti, Barangay Libo to Pandan, and Barangay Calasumanga, which is now connected with the municipality of Polillo through tricycle.

=== Barangays ===
Panukulan is politically subdivided into 13 barangays, as indicated below. Each barangay consists of puroks and some have sitios.

- Balungay
- Bato
- Bonbon
- Calasumanga
- Kinalagti
- Libo
- Lipata
- Matangkap
- Milawid
- Pagitan
- Pandan
- Rizal
- San Juan (Poblacion)

=== Climate ===
Climate data for Panukulan, Quezon
Month	Jan	Feb	Mar	Apr	May	Jun	Jul	Aug	Sep	Oct	Nov	Dec	Year
Mean daily maximum °C (°F)	26 (79)	27 (81)	28 (82)	30 (86)	31 (88)	30 (86)	20 (68)	30 (86)	29 (84)	29 (84)	28 (82)	27 (81)	28 (82)
Mean daily minimum °C (°F)	21 (70)	21 (70)	22 (72)	23 (73)	24 (75)	25 (77)	24 (75)	24 (75)	24 (75)	23 (73)	23 (73)	22 (72)	23 (73)
Average precipitation mm (inches)	33 (1.3)	26 (1.0)	26 (1.0)	30 (1.2)	109 (4.3)	165 (6.5)	187 (7.4)	163 (6.4)	162 (6.4)	147 (5.8)	85 (3.3)	74 (2.9)	1,207 (47.5)
Average rainy days	10.2	7.6	9.6	10.5	19.9	23.6	26.0	24.8	24.5	19.6	12.7	13.0	202
Source: Meteoblue

== Demographics ==
Population census of Panukulan
Year	Pop.	±% p.a.
1960	2,704	—
1970	6,092	+8.45%
1975	7,657	+4.69%
1980	7,885	+0.59%
1990	9,815	+2.21%
1995	10,351	+1.00%
2000	11,311	+1.92%
2007	11,968	+0.78%
2010	12,511	+1.63%
2015	13,546	+1.53%
2020	16,376	+4.07%
2024	17,118	+1.07%
Source: Philippine Statistics Authority

== Economy ==
Poverty incidence of Panukulan (%)

Source: Philippine Statistics Authority

== Education ==
The Panukulan Schools District Office governs all educational institutions within the municipality. It oversees the management and operations of all private and public, from primary to secondary schools.

=== Primary and elementary schools ===
- Balungay Elementary School
- Bato Elementary School
- Bonbon Elementary School
- Bongliw Elementary School
- Calasumanga Elementary School
- Kinalagte Elementary School
- Libo Elementary School
- Lipata Elementary School
- Matangcap Elementary School
- Milawid Elementary School
- Pagitan Elementary School
- Pandan Elementary School
- Panukulan Central School
- Rizal Elementary School

=== Secondary schools ===
- Bonbon National High School
- Calasumanga National High School
- Libo National High School
- Panukulan National High School

== See also ==
- Polillo Islands
