= Patnanungan =

Municipality in Quezon, Philippines

- Municipality
- Municipality of Patnanungan
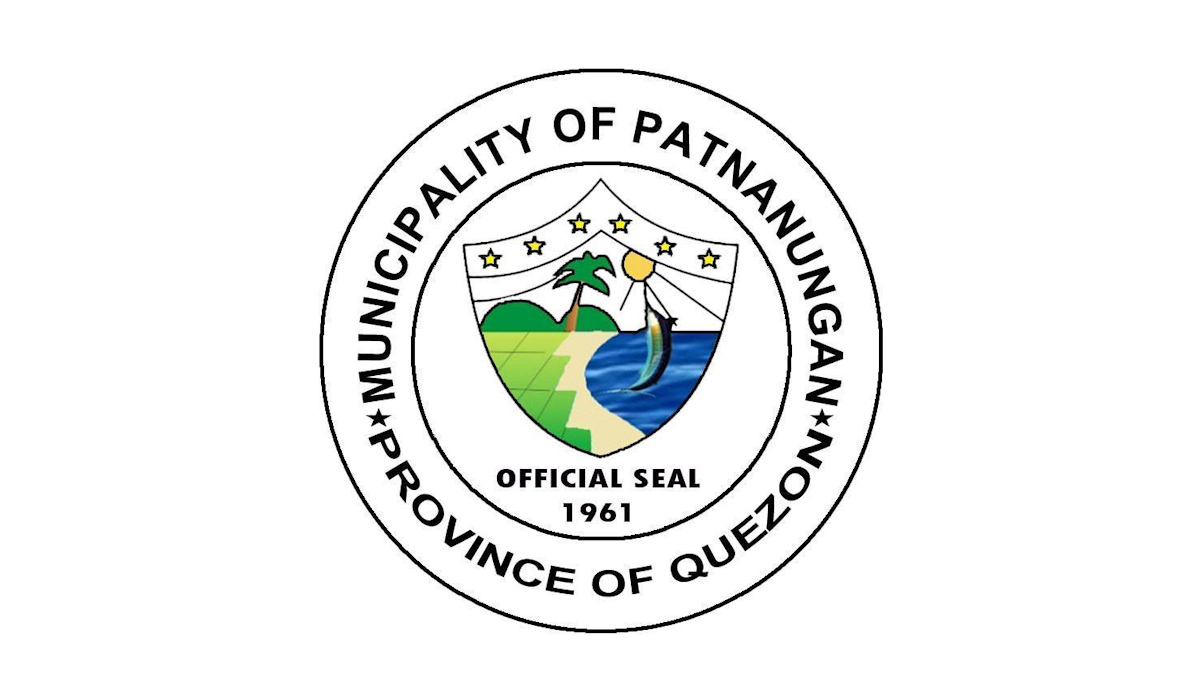
- Flag

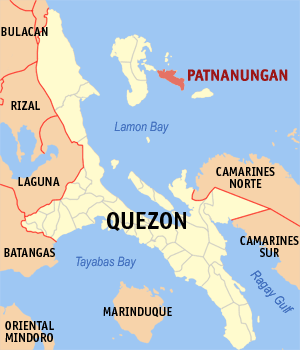
- Map of Quezon with Patnanungan highlighted
- Interactive map of Patnanungan
- Location within the Philippines
- Coordinates: 14°45′14″N 122°13′05″E
- Country: Philippines
- Region: Calabarzon
- Province: Quezon
- District: 1st district
- Founded: June 18, 1961
- Barangays: 6 (see Barangays)

Government
  - Type: Sangguniang Bayan
  - Mayor: Marie Claire A. Larita
  - Vice Mayor: Reynaldo A. Añonuevo
  - Representative: Wilfrido Mark M. Enverga
  - Municipal Council: Members: Letecia G. Lopez; Edwin R. Aguilar; Jose D. Caballero; Nelson G. Manlugon; Rodrigo B. Toledo; Ronald A. Armada; Babyjean C. Bantucan; Roberto G. Briz
  - Electorate: 8,734 voters (2025)

Area
  - Total: 139.20 km^{2} (53.75 sq mi)
- Elevation: 6.0 m (19.7 ft)
- Highest elevation: 319 m (1,047 ft)
- Lowest elevation: 0 m (0 ft)

Population (2024 census)
  - Total: 15,554
  - Density: 111.74/km^{2} (289.40/sq mi)
  - Households: 3,426
- Demonym: Patnanunganin

Economy
  - Income class: 4th municipal income class
  - Poverty incidence: 17.07% (2023)
  - Revenue: ₱ 121.3 million (2024)
  - Assets: ₱ 227.1 million (2024)
  - Expenditure: ₱ 42.39 million (2024)
  - Liabilities: ₱ 50.28 million (2024)

Service provider
  - Electricity: Quezon 2 Electric Cooperative (QUEZELCO 2)
- Time zone: UTC+8 (PST)
- ZIP code: 4341
- PSGC: 0405632000
- IDD : area code: +63 (0)42
- Native languages: Tagalog
- Website: www.patnanungan.gov.ph

Patnanungan, officially the Municipality of Patnanungan (Tagalog: Bayan ng Patnanungan), is a municipality in the province of Quezon, Philippines. According to the 2024 census, it has a population of 15,554 people.

== History ==
Patnanungan was once a barrio part of Polillo, dating back to the Spanish colonial era. On June 12, 1948, barrio Patnanungan was excised from Polillo and incorporated into the newly established municipality of Burdeos.

Patnanungan was established as a municipal district on June 18, 1961, out of six barrios and ten islands previously from Burdeos.

== Geography ==
A shoe-shaped island municipality facing the Philippine Sea, it has various island and islet borders like Burdeos, Jomalig Island, Pollilo Strait, Lamon Bay and Palasan Island. It is part of the Polillo Islands.

=== Barangays ===
Patnanungan is politically subdivided into 6 barangays, as indicated below. Each barangay consists of puroks and some have sitios.

- Amaga
- Busdak
- Kilogan
- Luod
- Patnanungan Norte
- Patnanungan Sur (Poblacion)

=== Climate ===
Climate data for Patnanungan, Quezon
Month	Jan	Feb	Mar	Apr	May	Jun	Jul	Aug	Sep	Oct	Nov	Dec	Year
Mean daily maximum °C (°F)	26 (79)	27 (81)	28 (82)	30 (86)	31 (88)	30 (86)	29 (84)	29 (84)	29 (84)	29 (84)	28 (82)	26 (79)	29 (83)
Mean daily minimum °C (°F)	22 (72)	22 (72)	22 (72)	23 (73)	24 (75)	25 (77)	25 (77)	24 (75)	24 (75)	24 (75)	23 (73)	22 (72)	23 (74)
Average precipitation mm (inches)	40 (1.6)	33 (1.3)	35 (1.4)	38 (1.5)	138 (5.4)	190 (7.5)	242 (9.5)	216 (8.5)	224 (8.8)	200 (7.9)	114 (4.5)	94 (3.7)	1,564 (61.6)
Average rainy days	12.2	9.0	11.0	11.7	21.5	24.0	27.2	26.1	26.8	22.3	16.3	15.1	223.2
Source: Meteoblue

== Demographics ==
Population census of Patnanungan
Year	Pop.	±% p.a.
1970	5,038	—
1975	6,371	+4.82%
1980	7,456	+3.19%
1990	9,447	+2.40%
1995	9,638	+0.38%
2000	11,034	+2.94%
2007	12,825	+2.10%
2010	13,865	+2.88%
2015	14,606	+1.00%
2020	15,052	+0.64%
2024	15,554	+0.79%
Source: Philippine Statistics Authority

== Economy ==
Poverty incidence of Patnanungan (%)

Source: Philippine Statistics Authority

== Government ==
=== Elected officials ===
Municipal council (2022-2025):

Members of the Patnanungan Municipal Council
Position	Name
Mayor	Marie Claire A. Larita-Natividad
Vice Mayor	Reynaldo Añonuevo
Councilors
Councilors	Leticia G. Lopez
Councilors	Edwin Aguilar
Councilors	Jose Caballero
Councilors	Nelson Manlugon
Councilors	Rodrigo Toledo
Councilors	Ronald Armada
Councilors	Baby Jean C. Bantucan
Councilors	Roberto Briz
Councilors	Arjan P. Bandales (Ex-Officio Member, PPSK President)

== Education ==
The Patnanungan-Jomalig Schools District Office governs all educational institutions within the municipality. It oversees the management and operations of all private and public, from primary to secondary schools.

=== Primary and elementary schools ===
- Amaga Elementary School
- Busdak Elementary School
- Guinaygayan Elementary School
- Katakian Elementary School
- Kilogan Elementary School
- Luod Integrated School
- Patnanungan Central School
- Patnanungan Norte Elementary School
- Sinintan Elementary School
- St. Isidore Diocesan School
- Tapol Elementary School

=== Secondary schools ===
- Busdak National High School
- Paaralang Sekundarya ng Patnanungan Norte
- Patnanungan National High School

== See also ==
- List of islands of the Philippines
