= Polillo Island =

Island in the Philippines

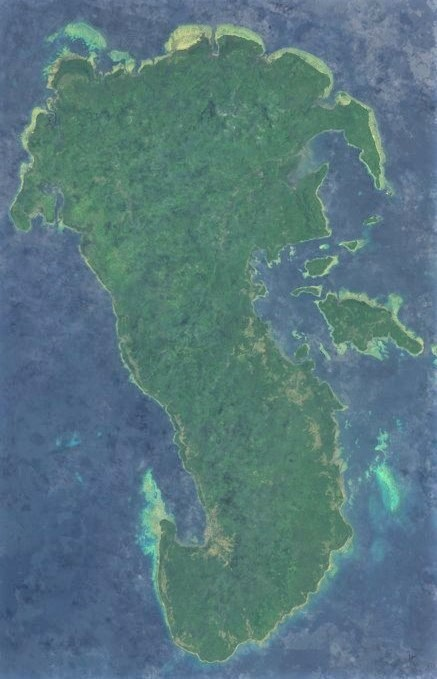
- Polillo island satellite image captured by Sentinel-2 in 2016

- Location within Luzon Location within Philippines

Geography
- Location: Lamon Bay
- Coordinates: 14°50′34″N 121°55′45″E
- Archipelago: Polillo Islands
- Adjacent to: Philippine Sea; Polillo Strait
- Area: 628.9 km^{2} (242.8 sq mi)
- Highest elevation: 1,063 ft (324 m)
- Highest point: Mount Malolo

Administration
- Philippines
- Region: Calabarzon
- Province: Quezon
- Municipalities: Burdeos; Panukulan; Polillo
- Largest municipality: Polillo (pop. 28,125)

Demographics
- Population: 64,802 (2010)
- Pop. density: 103.0/km^{2} (266.8/sq mi)

Additional information

Polillo (Tagalog pronunciation: [poˈliljo̞]) is an island in the northeastern region of the Philippine archipelago. It is the largest island and the namesake of the Polillo Islands. It is separated from Luzon Island by the Polillo Strait and forms the northern side of Lamon Bay.

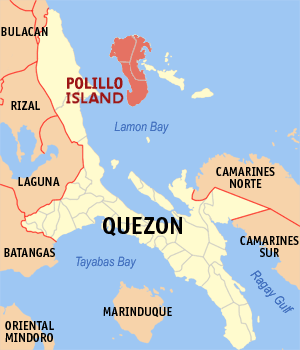
Location within Quezon province

The island itself is subdivided across three municipalities. The municipality of Polillo covers the southern portion of the island, while the northeastern part is administered by the municipality of Burdeos. The northwest is within the jurisdiction of the municipality of Panukulan. The island is also home to the Butaan lizard, a vulnerable relative of the Komodo dragon.

As of the 2010 Philippine Census, the island is home to 64,802 individuals.

In the mid-16th century, Spaniards came to the island and built a chapel there. They took charge of the management of the island and brought much change and development.

== See also ==
- Burdeos, Quezon
- Panukulan, Quezon
- Polillo, Quezon
