= Sampaloc, Quezon =

Municipality in Quezon, Philippines

Sampaloc
- Municipality
- Municipality of Sampaloc
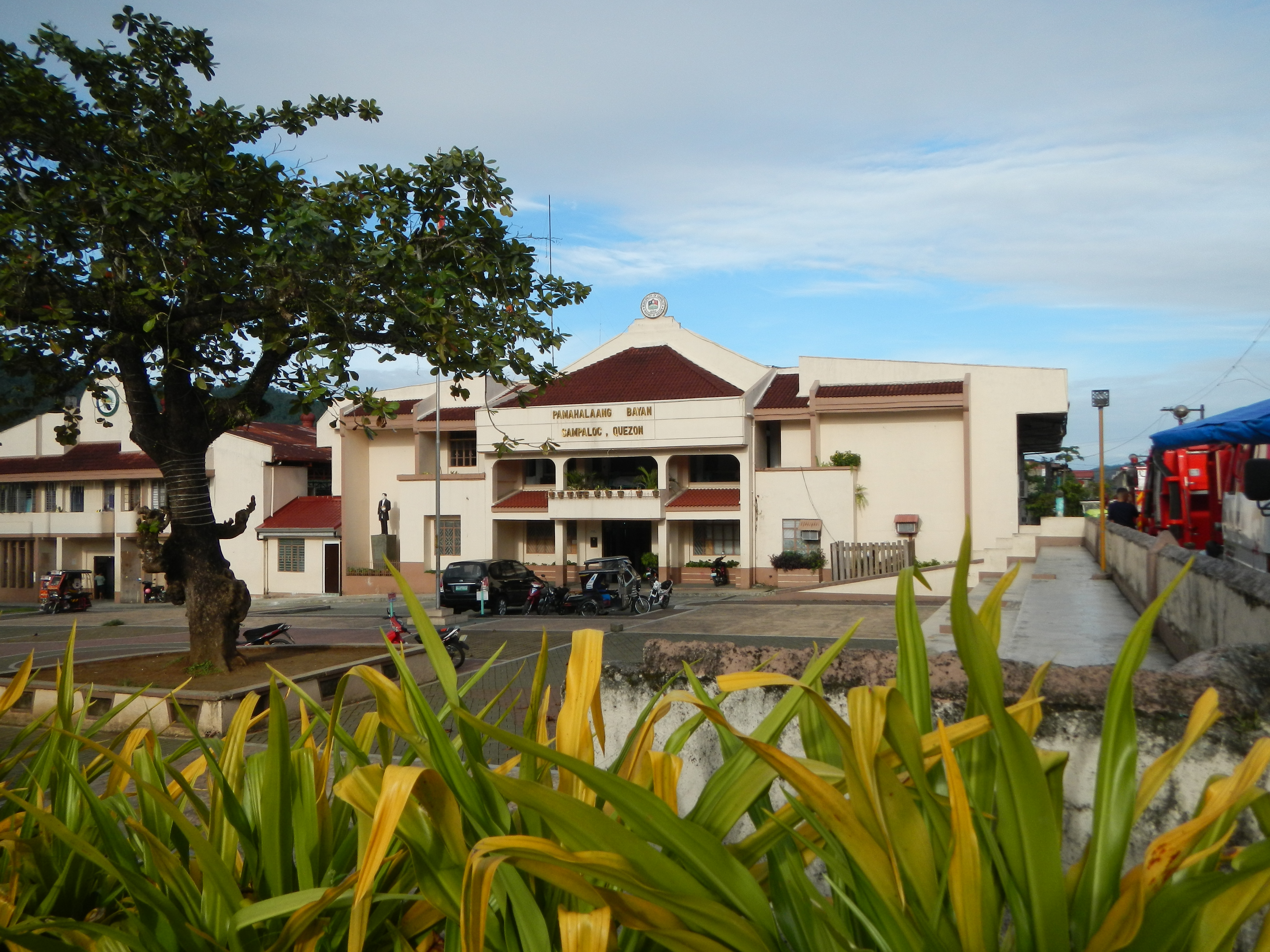
- Sampaloc Municipal Hall

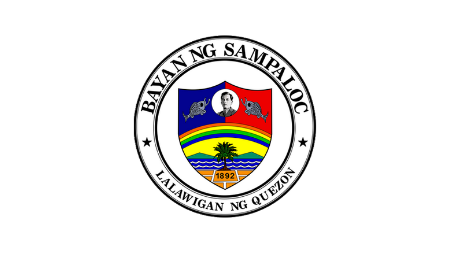
- Flag Seal
- Etymology: Tamarind
- Nicknames: Clean and Greenest Town on Quezon
- Motto: Ang Galing ng Sampalukin
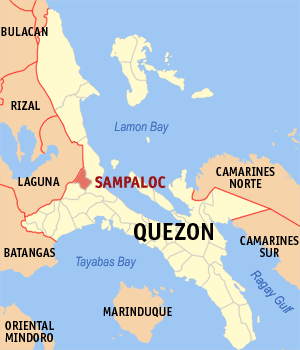
- Map of Quezon with Sampaloc highlighted
- Interactive map of Sampaloc
- Location within the Philippines
- Coordinates: 14°09′45″N 121°38′16″E
- Country: Philippines
- Region: Calabarzon
- Province: Quezon
- District: 1st district
- Founded: February 17, 1892
- Barangays: 14 (see Barangays)

Government
  - Type: Sangguniang Bayan
  - Mayor: Noel Angelo T. Devanadera
  - Vice Mayor: Teresita "Bunay" Villeno
  - Representative: Wilfrido Mark M. Enverga
  - Municipal Council: Members: Earl Donne S. Abeja; Abner T. Dayo; Miriam O. Dayo; Normandy D. Encina; Nicolas Andre T. Devanadera; Cipriano C. Gagan; Elynor D. Puebla; Enrico T. Lebantino
  - Electorate: 10,179 voters (2025)

Area
  - Total: 104.78 km^{2} (40.46 sq mi)
- Elevation: 232 m (761 ft)
- Highest elevation: 479 m (1,572 ft)
- Lowest elevation: 14 m (46 ft)

Population (2024 census)
  - Total: 13,331
  - Density: 127.23/km^{2} (329.52/sq mi)
  - Households: 3,447
- Demonym: Sampalukin

Economy
  - Income class: 4th municipal income class
  - Poverty incidence: 4.79% (2023)
  - Revenue: ₱ 120.8 million (2024)
  - Assets: ₱ 290.6 million (2024)
  - Expenditure: ₱ 53.59 million (2024)
  - Liabilities: ₱ 57.32 million (2024)

Service provider
  - Electricity: Manila Electric Company (Meralco)
- Time zone: UTC+8 (PST)
- ZIP code: 4329
- PSGC: 0405639000
- IDD : area code: +63 (0)42
- Native languages: Tagalog

Sampaloc, officially the Municipality of Sampaloc (Tagalog: Bayan ng Sampaloc), is a municipality in the province of Quezon, Philippines. According to the 2024 census, it has a population of 13,331 people.

== History ==
In 1935, Teodoro Asedillo operated in Sampaloc and nearby towns in Laguna and was branded as an outlaw by authorities. He was joined by Nicolas Encallado, a Sampaloc native and veteran of the Philippine Revolution and Philippine-American war. A manhunt was launched against Asedillo and Sampaloc and other towns were subjected to surveillance and hamleting. Asedillo was eventually killed by authorities led by Lt. Jesus Vargas on December 31, 1935, after a shootout in Barangay Kaldong.

== Geography ==
Surrounded by the Sierra Madre Mountains, makes it cold all year around. The Maapon River which divides the northern part of Sampaloc and the Southern half, it delivers pure, clean, fresh and crystal-clear water from the neighboring province of Laguna. Many caves are also found here, the Malaog cave is an example. Waterfalls are also found here, almost every barangay has one, Asidillo Falls on Barangay. Caldong, Bayongon Falls on Barangay. Bayongon. The Highest point can be found on Barangay Caldong which meters above sea level, while the lowest point can be found on Barangay Banot which is less than 20 meters above sea level.

Sampaloc is situated in a valley completely surrounded by high evergreen hills in the heart of the Sierra Madre Mountains between the municipalities of Lucban and Mauban. It is 53 kilometers (33 mi) from Lucena, 183 kilometers (114 mi) from Manila, and 17 kilometers (11 mi) from Lucban.

=== Barangays ===
Sampaloc is politically subdivided into 14 barangays, as indicated below. Each barangay consists of puroks and some have sitios.

- Alupay
- Apasan
- Banot
- Bataan
- Bayongon (Poblacion)
- Bilucao
- Caldong
- Ibabang Owain (Poblacion)
- Ilayang Owain (Poblacion)
- Mamala
- San Bueno
- San Isidro (Poblacion)
- San Roque (Poblacion)
- Taquico

=== Climate ===
Climate data for Sampaloc, Quezon
Month	Jan	Feb	Mar	Apr	May	Jun	Jul	Aug	Sep	Oct	Nov	Dec	Year
Mean daily maximum °C (°F)	27 (81)	28 (82)	29 (84)	31 (88)	31 (88)	30 (86)	29 (84)	29 (84)	29 (84)	28 (82)	28 (82)	27 (81)	29 (84)
Mean daily minimum °C (°F)	20 (68)	20 (68)	21 (70)	22 (72)	24 (75)	24 (75)	24 (75)	24 (75)	23 (73)	23 (73)	22 (72)	21 (70)	22 (72)
Average precipitation mm (inches)	52 (2.0)	35 (1.4)	27 (1.1)	27 (1.1)	82 (3.2)	124 (4.9)	163 (6.4)	144 (5.7)	145 (5.7)	141 (5.6)	100 (3.9)	102 (4.0)	1,142 (45)
Average rainy days	12.0	8.1	8.8	9.7	17.9	22.6	26.2	24.5	24.6	22.0	16.7	14.9	208
Source: Meteoblue

== Demographics ==
Population census of Sampaloc
Year	Pop.	±% p.a.
1903	1,263	—
1918	3,074	+6.11%
1939	4,540	+1.87%
1948	4,053	−1.25%
1960	6,538	+4.06%
1970	8,370	+2.50%
1975	8,874	+1.18%
1980	9,365	+1.08%
1990	11,132	+1.74%
1995	10,977	−0.26%
2000	12,858	+3.45%
2007	13,534	+0.71%
2010	13,107	−1.16%
2015	13,907	+1.13%
2020	13,629	−0.42%
2024	13,331	−0.53%
Source: Philippine Statistics Authority

== Economy ==
Poverty incidence of Sampaloc (%)

Source: Philippine Statistics Authority

== Government ==
=== Local government ===
- Municipal Mayor : Noel Angelo T. Devanadera
- Municipal Vice Mayor : Kenneth Nantes.

Councilors

- Andrew Anareta
- Teresita Vileno
- Mayleen Dayo
- Ric Dejelo
- Miriam Dayo
- Karl Tores
- Noel Casareo
- Jan Paul Jarafa

== Culture ==
=== Festivals ===
During the month of April, Buli products such as bags, hats, flowers, pockets and more are decorated in their houses. Bulihan Festival is also called "Mini Pahiyas". Parades roam around the town some celebrity stars also visited here. Meanwhile, there are also cooking contests, palarong pinoy, stage plays, beer fests, concerts, bag and hat making contests, fairs, and many more.

The festival, which comes from the word 'buri' or buli, is a large palm tree which can be seen in the town.

== Education ==
The Sampaloc Schools District Office governs all educational institutions within the municipality. It oversees the management and operations of all private and public, from primary to secondary schools.

There are some schools that can be found in this town:

=== Primary and elementary schools ===
- Alupay Elementary School
- Apasan Elementary School
- Banot Elementary School
- Bilucao Elementary School
- Caldong Resettlement Elementary School
- Caldong Elementary School
- Cocofed Kindergarten
- Green Purple Kiddie Learning Center
- Institute of Christian Educators Baptist Education System
- Pang-alaalang Paaralang Amando S. Dayo (Pasda)
- Sampaloc Adventist Elementary School
- Sampaloc Elementary School (Main)
- Sampaloc Elementary School (Annex)
- Sampaloc I Elementary School
- Sampaloc II Elementary School (Greenhills)

=== Secondary schools ===
- Adela S. Torres National Highschool
- Manuel S. Enverga Academy Foundation
- Sampaloc National High School

== Gallery ==
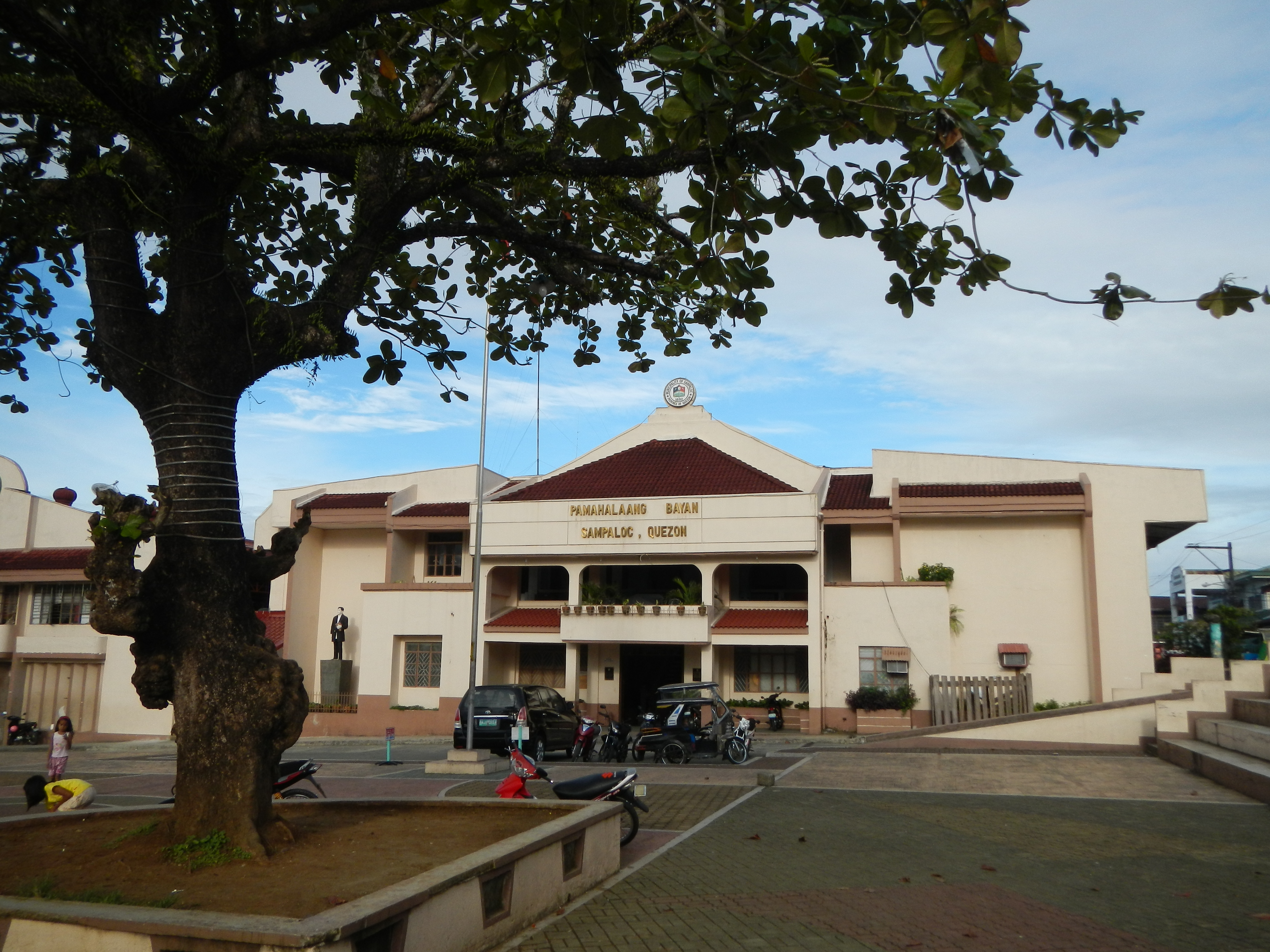
Sampaloc Municipal Hall

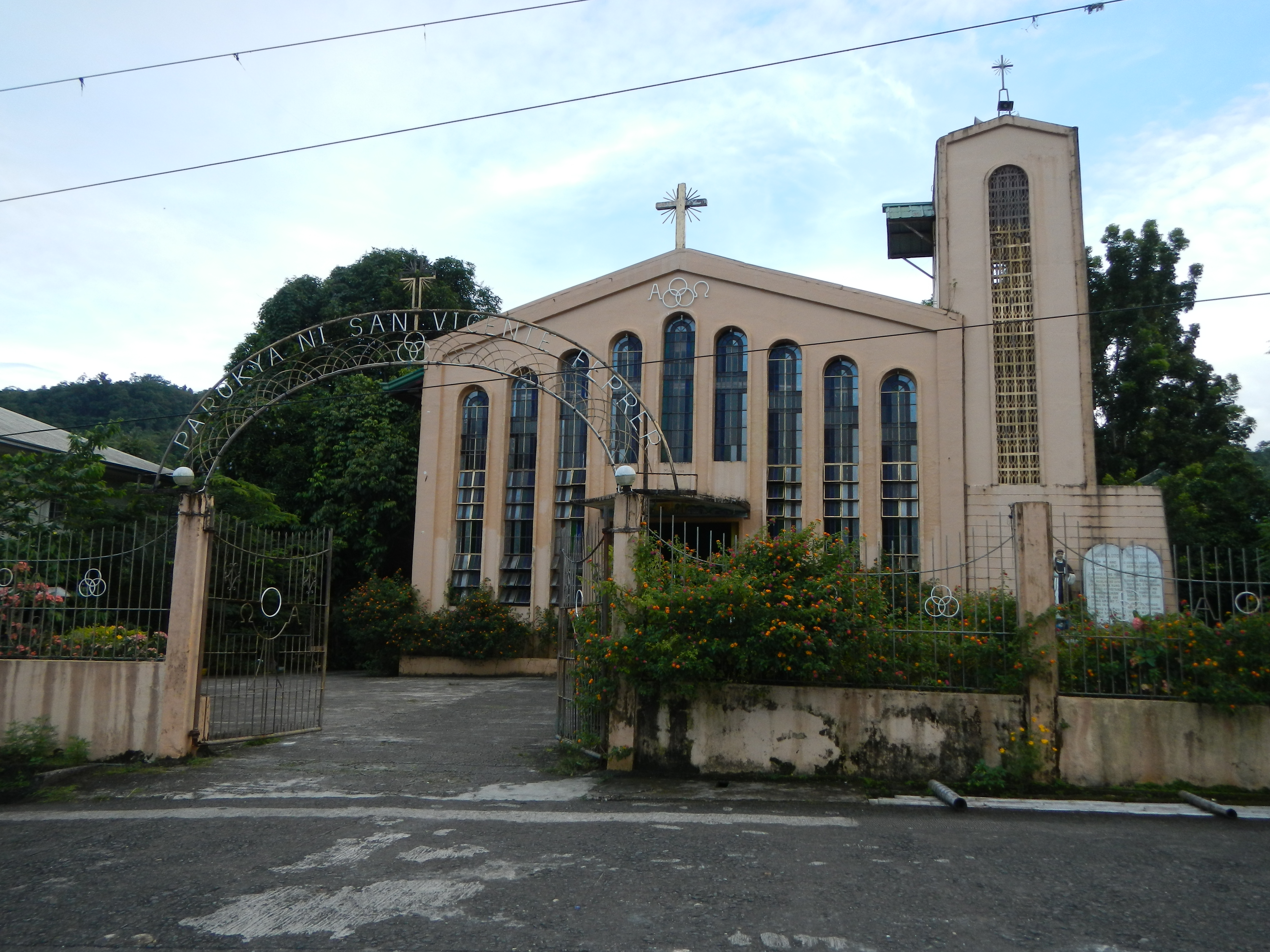
Sampaloc Church

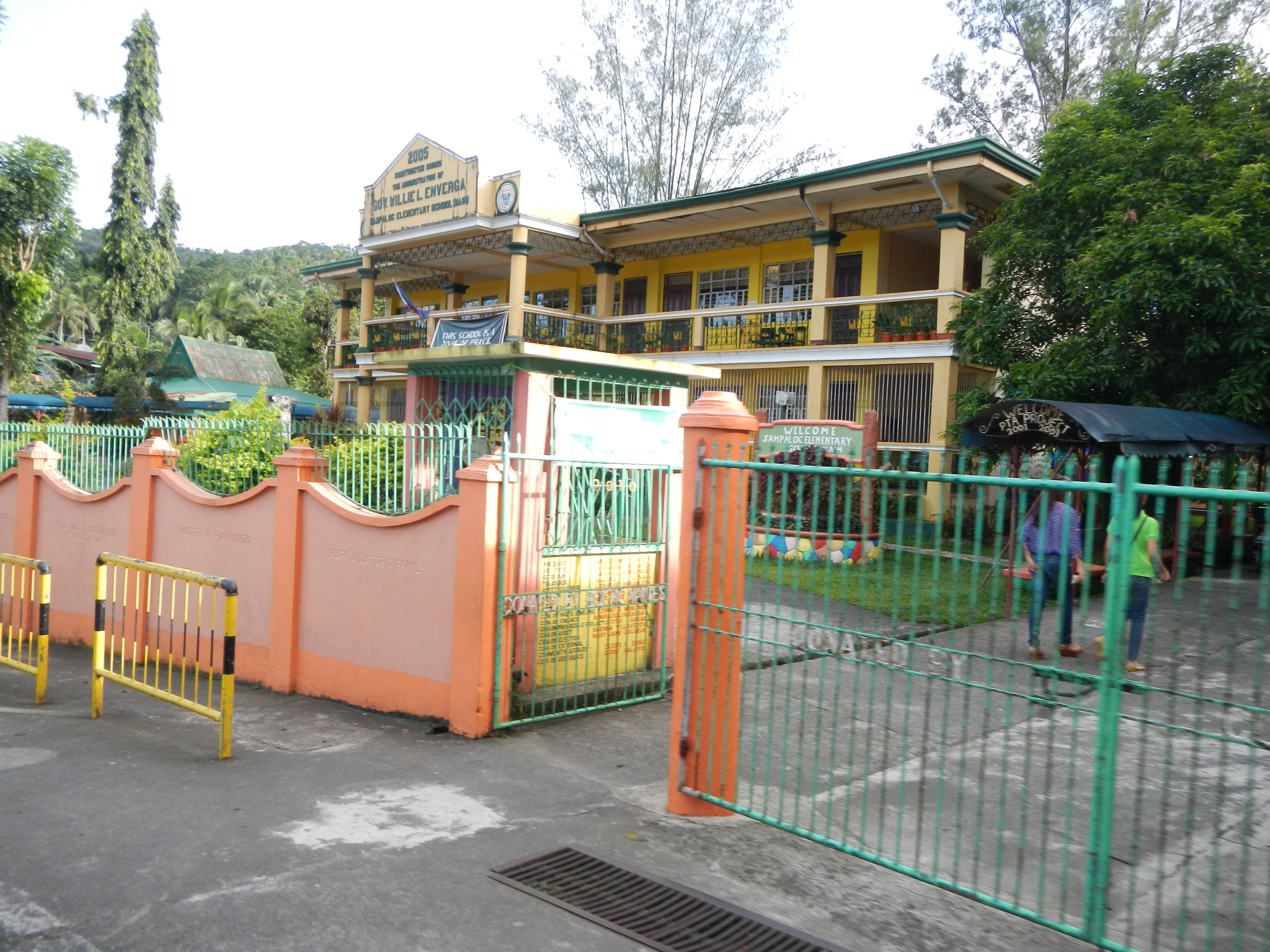
Sampaloc Central School

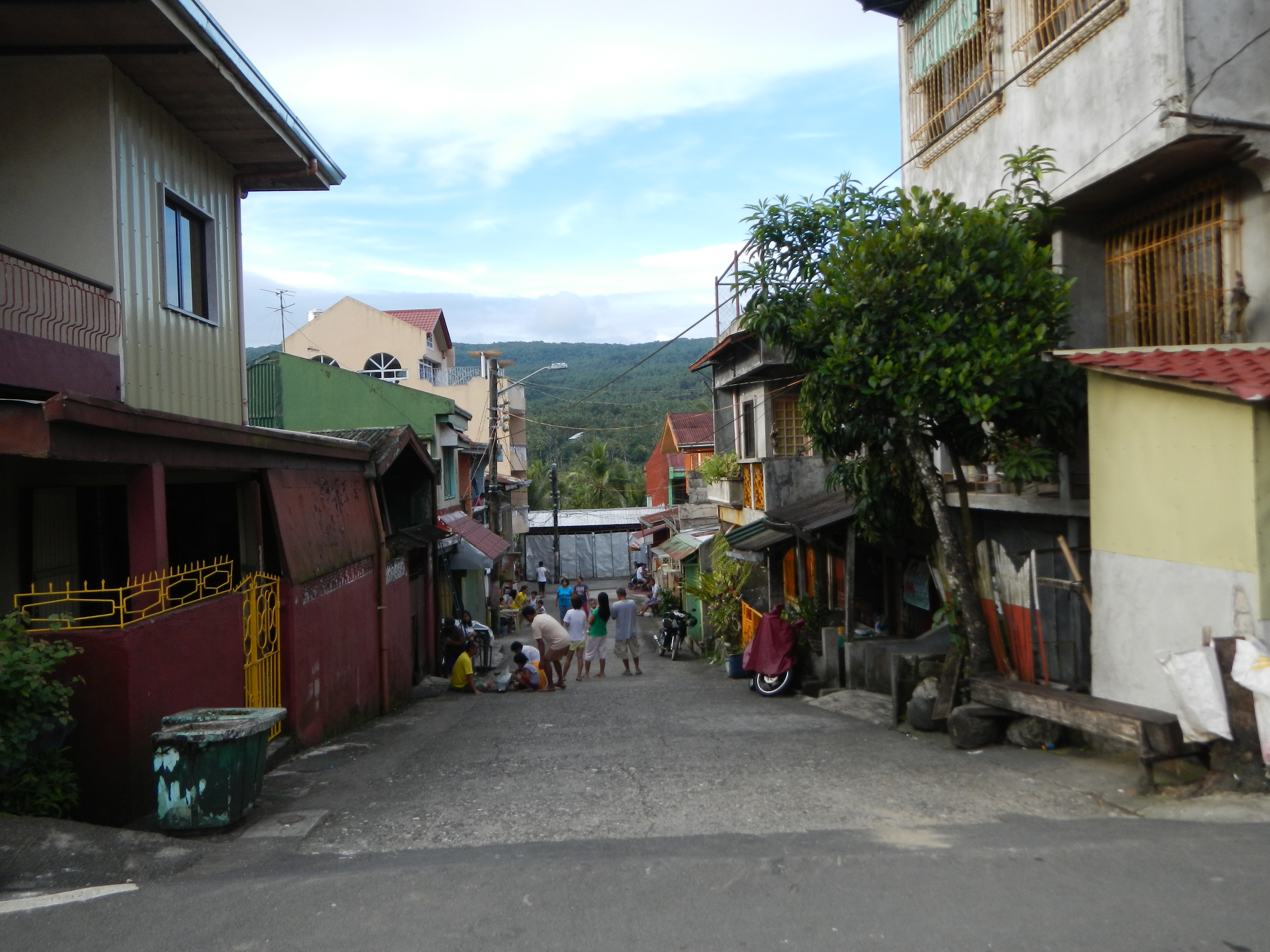
Street in Poblacion Sampaloc with the Sierra Madre mountains in the background
