= Dolores, Quezon =

Municipality in Quezon, Philippines

Dolores
- Municipality
- Municipality of Dolores
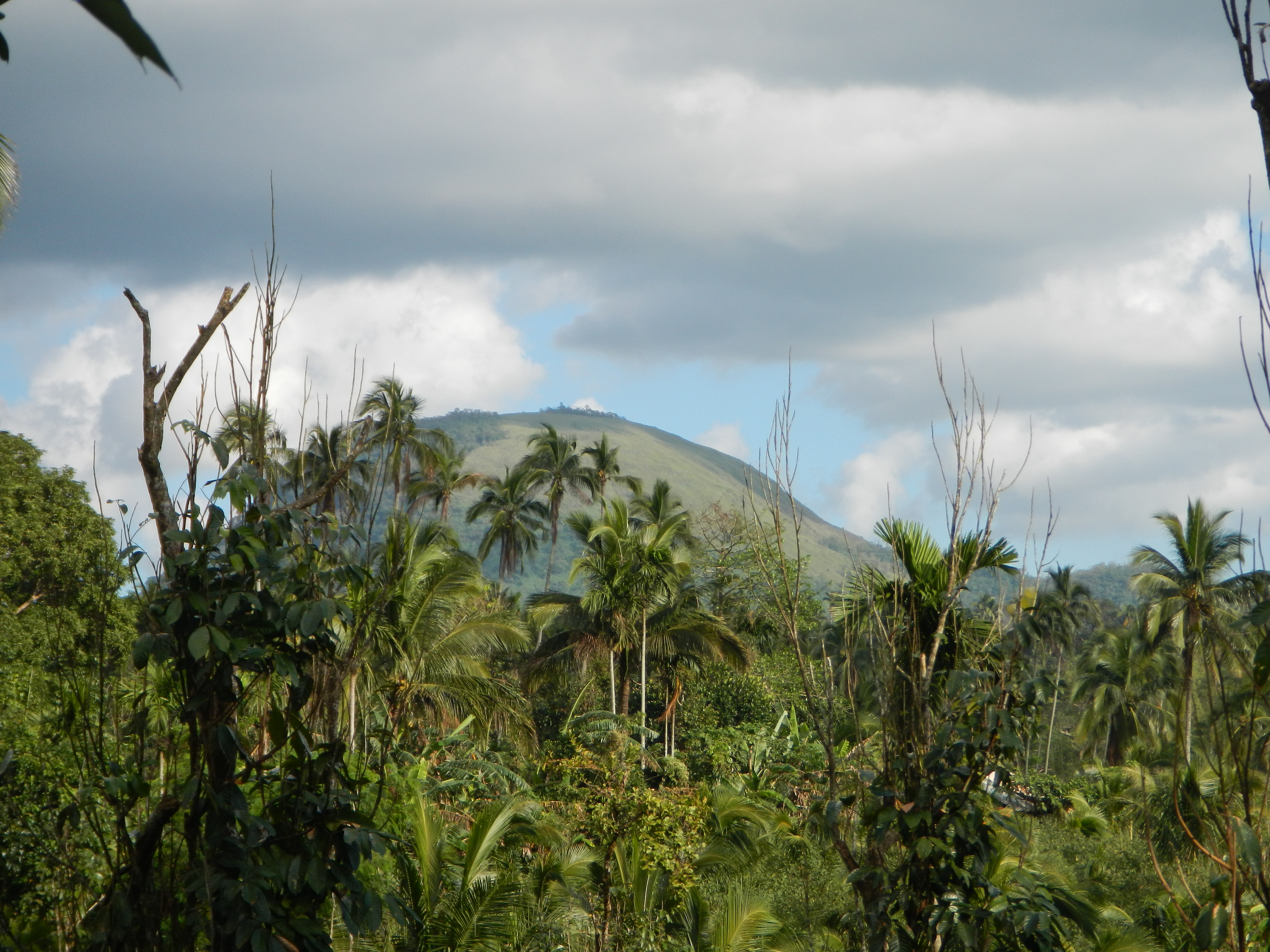
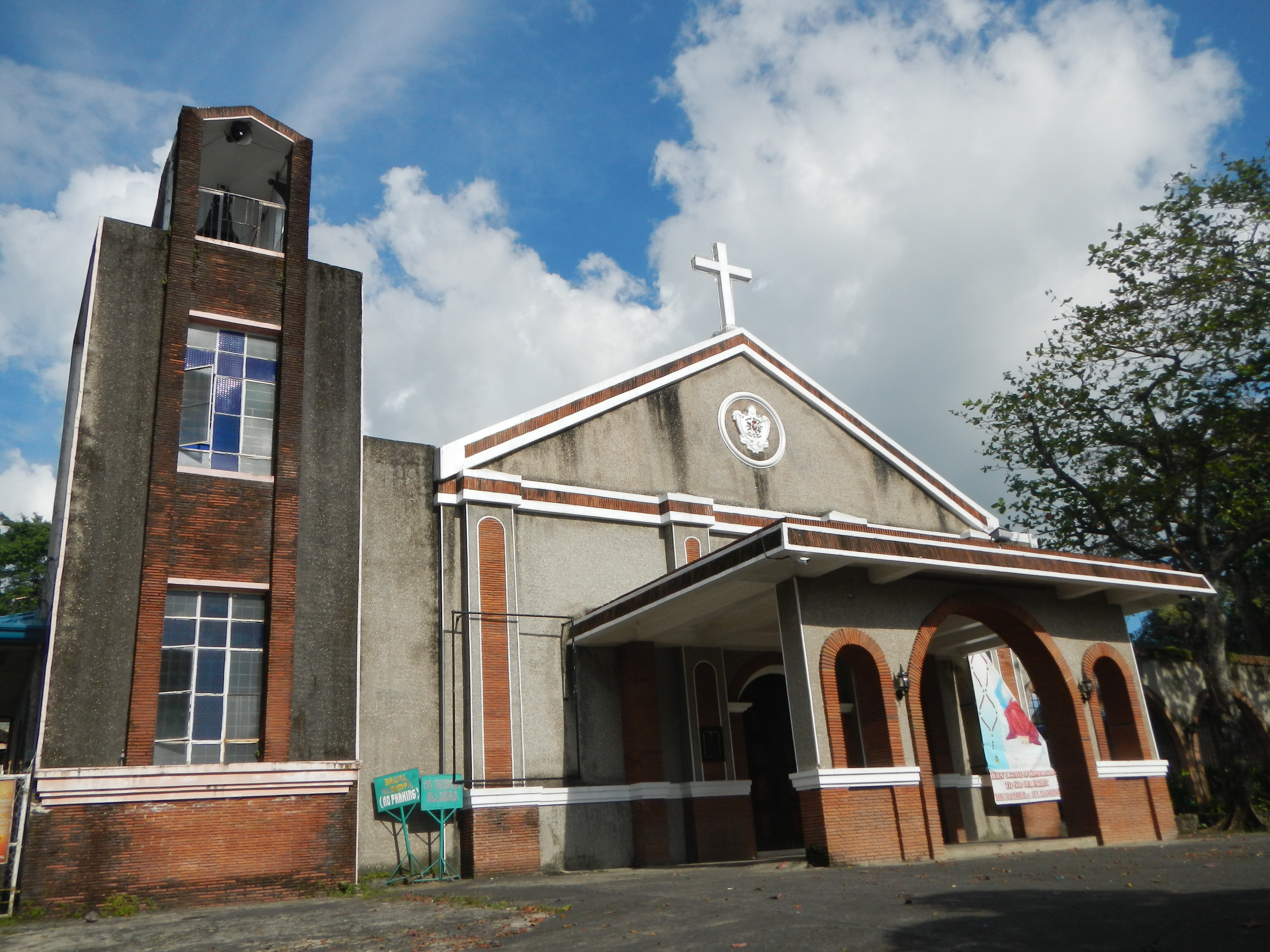
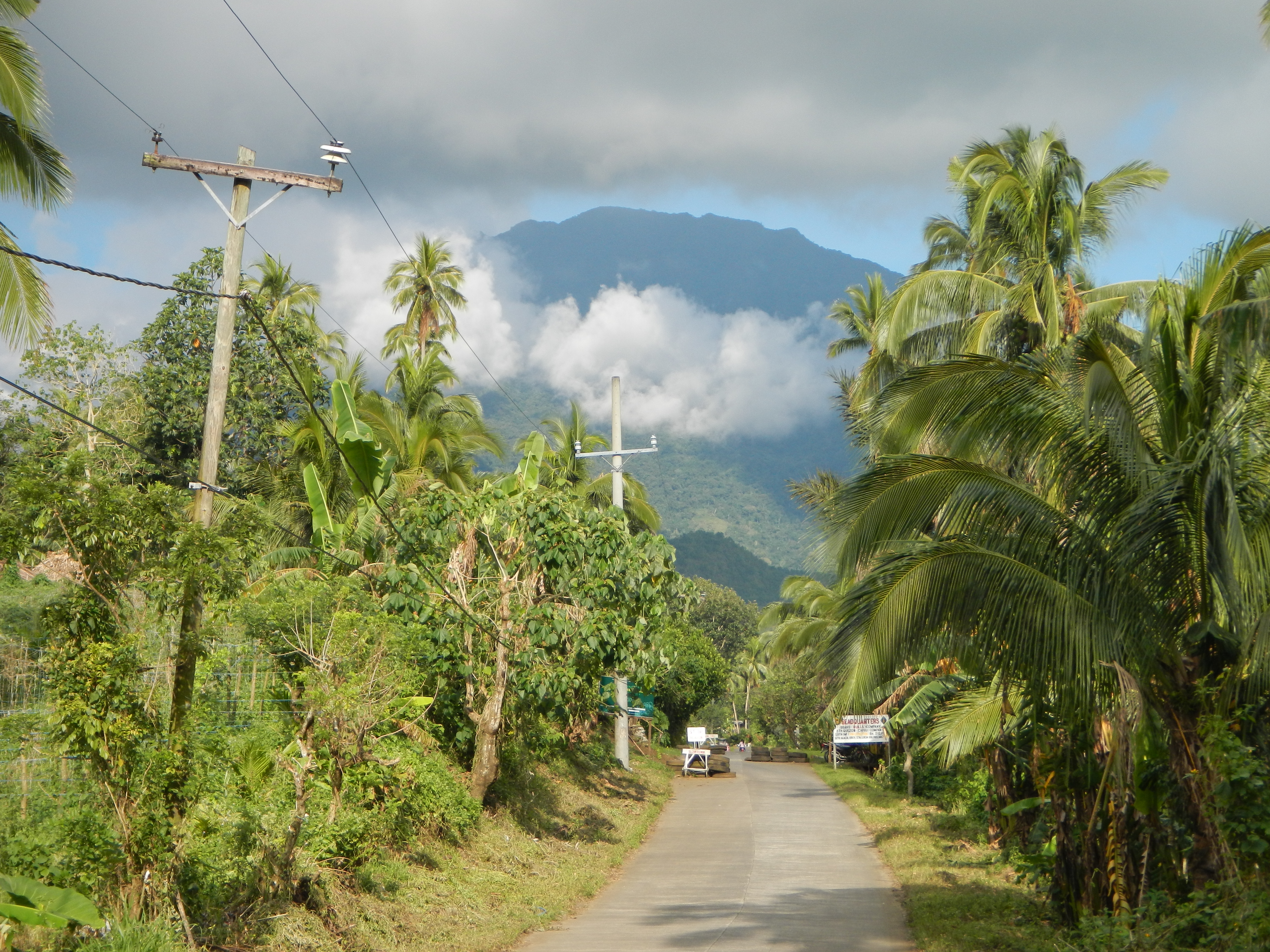
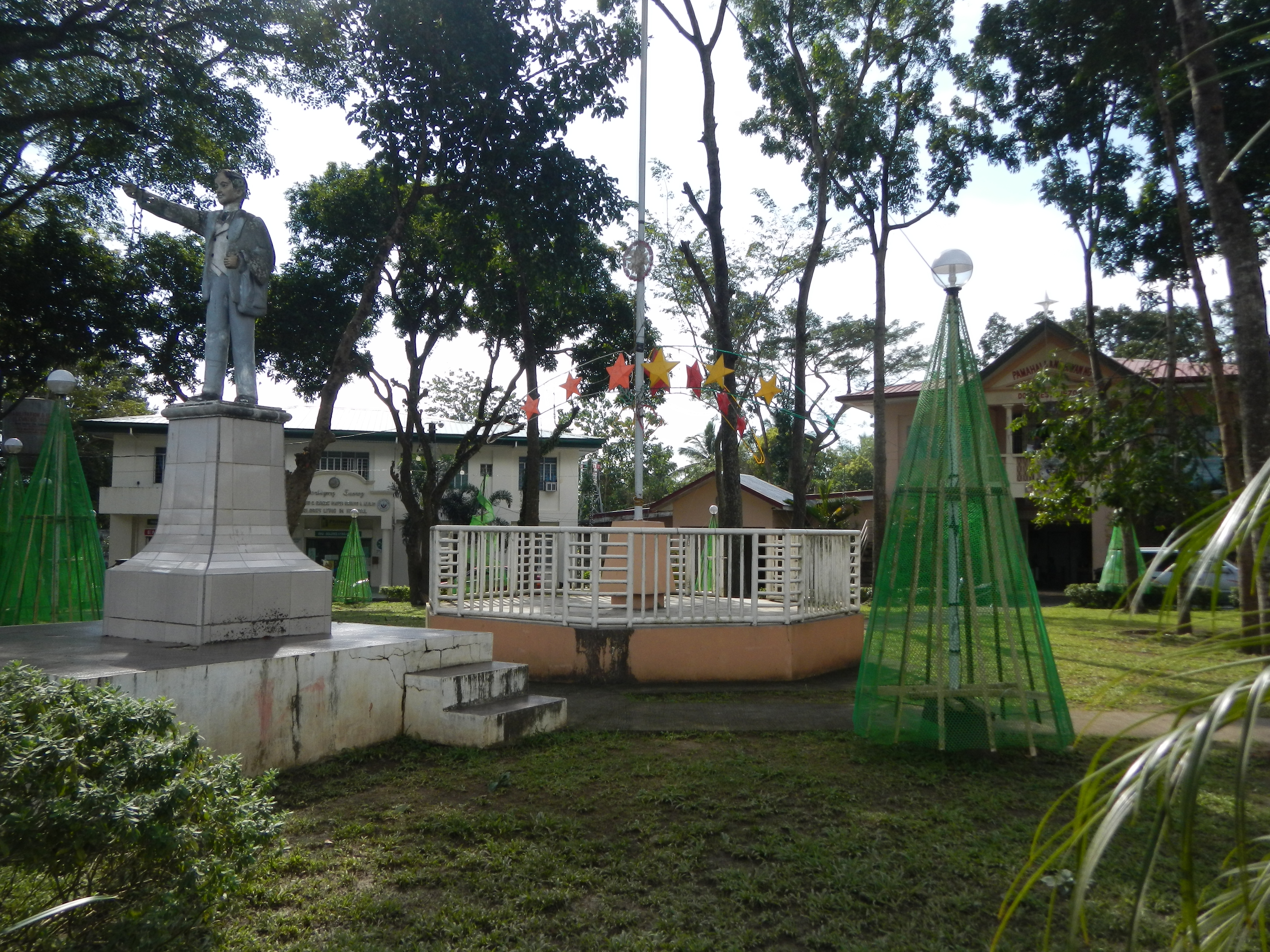
- Mt. Masalukot, National Shrine of Our Lady of Sorrows, Mount Banahaw, Municipal Hall

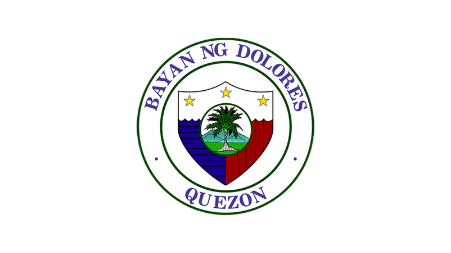
- Flag Seal
- Nickname: At the foot of Majestic Mt. Banahaw
- Motto: "Unlad Dolores!"
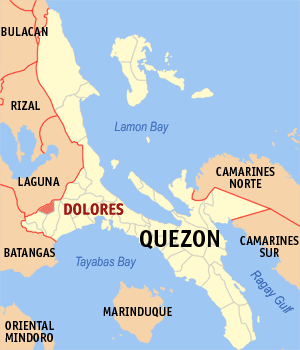
- Map of Quezon with Dolores highlighted
- Interactive map of Dolores
- Location within the Philippines
- Coordinates: 14°00′57″N 121°24′04″E
- Country: Philippines
- Region: Calabarzon
- Province: Quezon
- District: 2nd district
- Founded: April 11, 1835
- Annexation to Tiaong: May 17, 1902
- Chartered: April 11, 1910
- Barangays: 16 (see Barangays)

Government
  - Type: Sangguniang Bayan
  - Mayor: Orlan A. Calayag
  - Vice Mayor: Renato B. Alilio Jr.
  - Representative: David C. Suarez
  - Municipal Council: Members: Belinda P. Cruz; Archie L. Abrigo; Ma. Aileen C. Corabo; John Edward J. Reyes; Orlando A. Barsomo; Ma. Lilibeth D. Acuña; Arturo M. Bagsit; Arjay M. Angeles
  - Electorate: 22,229 voters (2025)

Area
  - Total: 62.60 km^{2} (24.17 sq mi)
- Elevation: 328 m (1,076 ft)
- Highest elevation: 2,167 m (7,110 ft)
- Lowest elevation: 38 m (125 ft)

Population (2024 census)
  - Total: 32,645
  - Density: 521.5/km^{2} (1,351/sq mi)
  - Households: 7,642
- Demonym: Doloresin

Economy
  - Income class: 3rd municipal income class
  - Poverty incidence: 4.16% (2023)
  - Revenue: ₱ 165.8 million (2024)
  - Assets: ₱ 428.2 million (2024)
  - Expenditure: ₱ 64.85 million (2024)

Service provider
  - Electricity: Manila Electric Company (Meralco)
- Time zone: UTC+8 (PST)
- ZIP code: 4326
- PSGC: 0405615000
- IDD : area code: +63 (0)42
- Native languages: Tagalog
- Website: www.doloresquezon.gov.ph

Dolores, officially the Municipality of Dolores (Tagalog: Bayan ng Dolores), is a municipality in the province of Quezon, Philippines. According to the 2024 census, it has a population of 32,645 people.

== Etymology ==
Dolores is a shortened form of its original name, Nuestra Señora de los Dolores, a Spanish title that translates to Our Lady of Sorrows in English.

== History ==
The town was established in 1834 as a pueblo. This was decided by provincial officials of Batangas and Tayabas, with the agreement from the bishop of Nueva Caceres and the archbishop of Manila. It was later approved by the Governor-General of the Philippines that a town shall be founded near Sitio Hambujan.

On April 11, 1835, the Governor-General issued a decree establishing the boundary of the town, then known as Nuestra Senora de los Dolores. In May 1835, the local government was inaugurated with Don Francisco Fernando as the first Governadorcillo. The town's seat of government was then Barrio de Maranli (present-day Poblacion), which remains the case until transferring to Bulakin II in September 1966.

Beginning on May 17, 1902, Dolores was temporarily consolidated with the municipality of Tiaong (Tiaon) by virtue of Act No. 402.

== Geography ==
Dolores is located at the foot of Mount Banahaw.

=== Barangays ===
Dolores is politically subdivided into 16 barangays, as indicated below. Each barangay consists of puroks and some have sitios.

- Antonino (Ayusan)
- Bagong Anyo (Poblacion)
- Bayanihan (Poblacion)
- Bulakin I
- Bulakin II
- Bungoy
- Cabatang
- Dagatan
- Kinabuhayan
- Maligaya (Poblacion)
- Manggahan
- Pinagdanlayan
- Putol
- San Mateo
- Santa Lucia
- Silanganan (Poblacion)

=== Climate ===
Climate data for Dolores, Quezon
Month	Jan	Feb	Mar	Apr	May	Jun	Jul	Aug	Sep	Oct	Nov	Dec	Year
Mean daily maximum °C (°F)	25 (77)	26 (79)	28 (82)	30 (86)	30 (86)	29 (84)	27 (81)	27 (81)	27 (81)	27 (81)	26 (79)	25 (77)	27 (81)
Mean daily minimum °C (°F)	19 (66)	19 (66)	19 (66)	20 (68)	22 (72)	23 (73)	22 (72)	22 (72)	22 (72)	21 (70)	20 (68)	20 (68)	21 (69)
Average precipitation mm (inches)	52 (2.0)	35 (1.4)	27 (1.1)	27 (1.1)	82 (3.2)	124 (4.9)	163 (6.4)	144 (5.7)	145 (5.7)	141 (5.6)	100 (3.9)	102 (4.0)	1,142 (45)
Average rainy days	12.0	8.1	8.8	9.7	17.9	22.6	26.2	24.5	24.6	22.0	16.7	14.9	208
Source: Meteoblue

== Demographics ==
Population census of Dolores
Year	Pop.	±% p.a.
1918	4,835	—
1939	6,263	+1.24%
1948	5,612	−1.21%
1960	9,143	+4.15%
1970	12,037	+2.78%
1975	13,617	+2.50%
1980	15,352	+2.43%
1990	18,146	+1.69%
1995	20,749	+2.54%
2000	23,649	+2.84%
2007	26,312	+1.48%
2010	27,702	+1.89%
2015	28,891	+0.80%
2020	32,514	+2.52%
2024	32,645	+0.10%
Source: Philippine Statistics Authority

== Economy ==
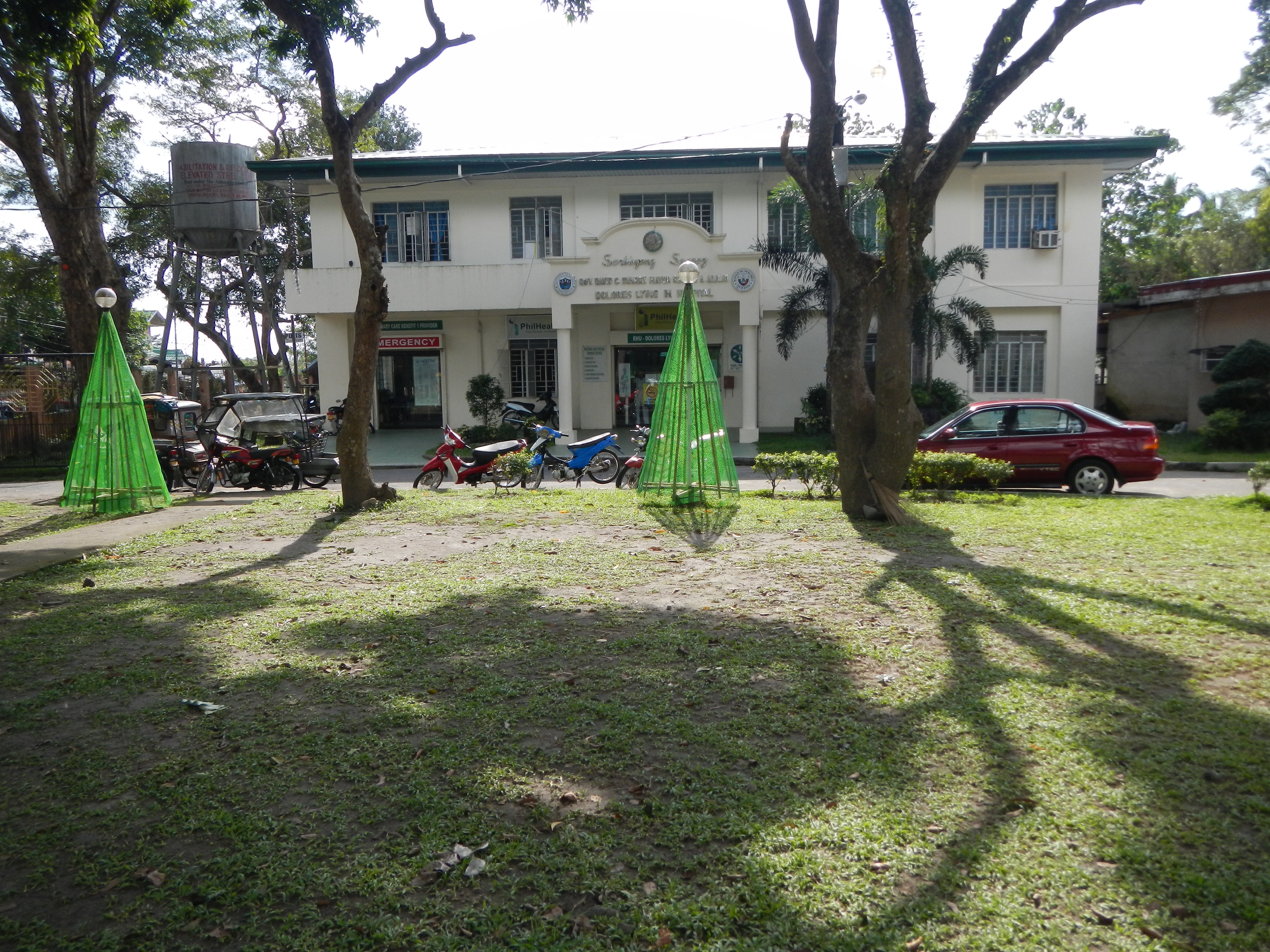
Dolores Municipal Hall

Poverty incidence of Dolores

Source: Philippine Statistics Authority

Dolores' economy is primarily based on agriculture. It has 3,858.29 hectares (9,534.0 acres) of land area devoted to local crops such as coconut, rambutan, citrus, and other fruit trees, etc.

The business sector of Dolores is dominated by retail of agricultural products.

== Tourism ==
- Bangkong Kahoy Valley Nature Retreat and Field Study Center
- Lukong Valley Farms
- National Shrine of Our Lady of Sorrows
- Paeng Falls

== Education ==
The Dolores Schools District Office governs all educational institutions within the municipality. It oversees the management and operations of all private and public, from primary to secondary schools.

=== Primary and elementary schools ===
- Antonino Elementary School
- Bulakin Elementary School
- Bungoy Elementary School
- CCD School Foundation
- Dolores Central School
- Dolores Central School (Annex)
- Dolores Christian School
- Don Eulogio Capino Elementary School
- Don Eulogio Capino Elementary School (Putol Annex)
- Don Severo Felismino Elementary School
- Gesu Bambino Parochial School
- Kinabuhayan Elementary School
- Our Lady of Sorrows Academy
- Pedro Bombane Elementary School
- Pinagdanlayan Elementary School
- Rosendo Algenio Elementary School

=== Secondary schools ===
- Dagatan National High School
- Sta. Lucia National High School
