= Polillo, Quezon =

Municipality in Quezon, Philippines

Polillo
- Municipality
- Municipality of Polillo
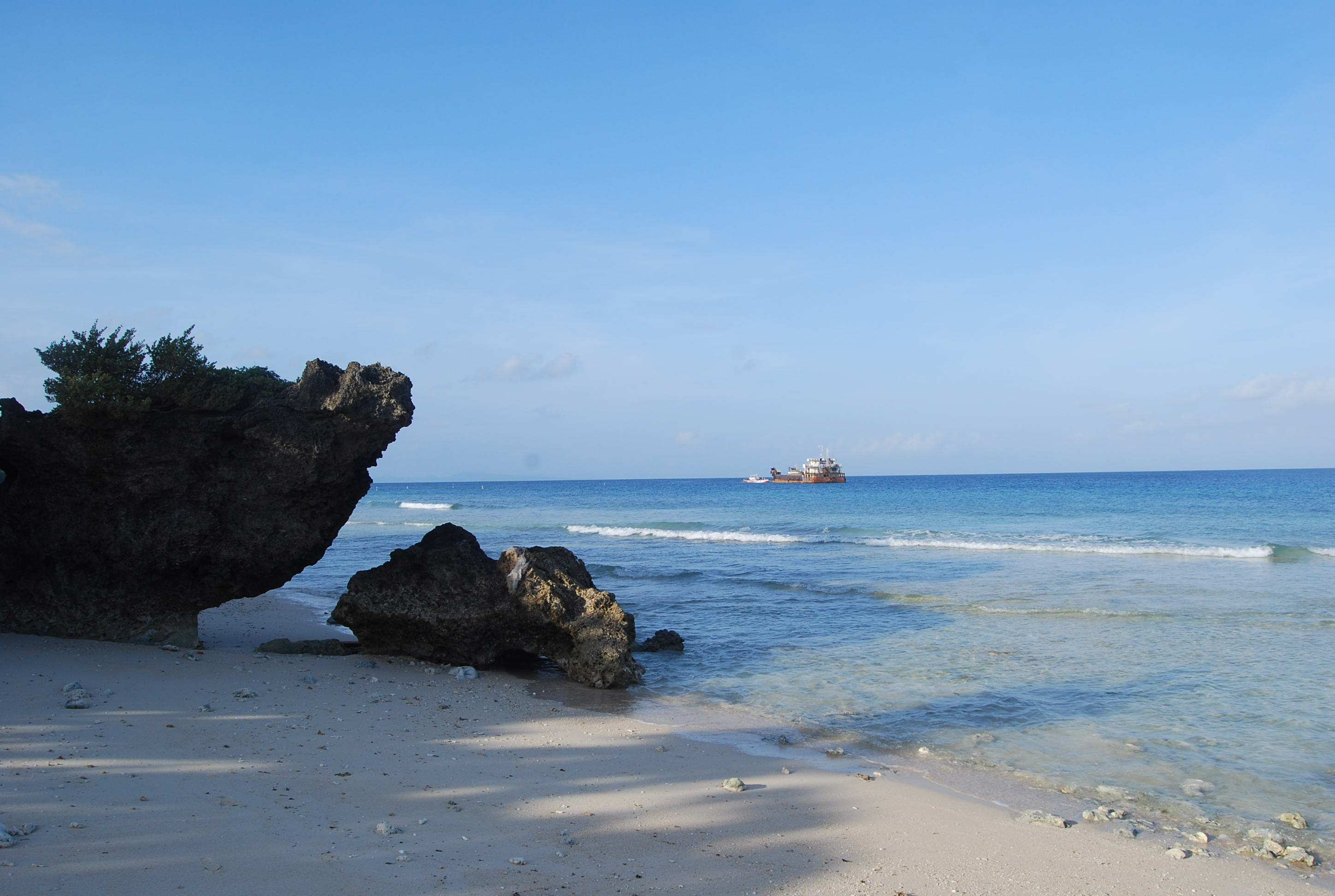
- Beach on Balesin Island

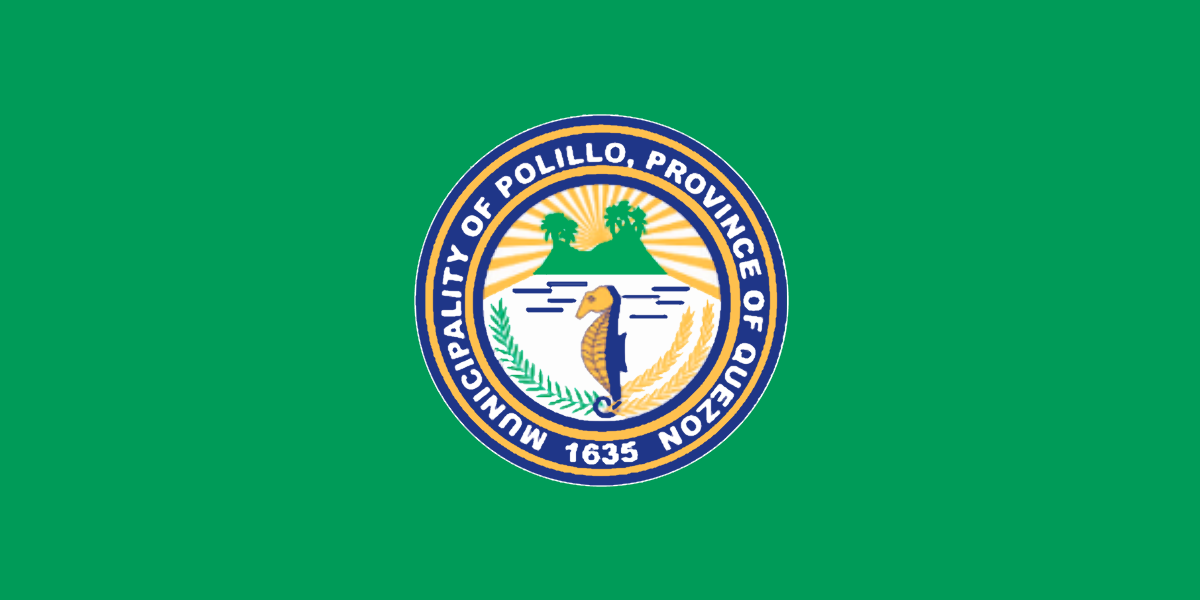
- Flag Seal
- Interactive map of Polillo
- Location within the Philippines
- Coordinates: 14°42′50″N 121°56′17″E
- Country: Philippines
- Region: Calabarzon
- Province: Quezon
- District: 1st district
- Founded: March 18, 1587
- Barangays: 20 (see Barangays)

Government
  - Type: Sangguniang Bayan
  - Mayor: Angelique E. Bosque
  - Vice Mayor: Loel F. Santoalla
  - Representative: Wilfrido Mark M. Enverga
  - Municipal Council: Members: Ginalyn O. Flores; Arnold Reagan G. Sandoval; Joel V. Asis; Claro A. Marasigan; Judy Rev V. Verzosa; Hubert Bismarck A. Espiritu; Rainier A. Dejoras; Cipriano A. Susa Jr.
  - Electorate: 21,072 voters (2025)

Area
  - Total: 253.00 km^{2} (97.68 sq mi)
- Elevation: 40 m (130 ft)
- Highest elevation: 178 m (584 ft)
- Lowest elevation: 0 m (0 ft)

Population (2024 census)
  - Total: 31,737
  - Density: 125.44/km^{2} (324.90/sq mi)
  - Households: 7,939
- Demonym(s): Polillohin; Polillians

Economy
  - Income class: 1st municipal income class
  - Poverty incidence: 9.54% (2023)
  - Revenue: ₱ 242.9 million (2024)
  - Assets: ₱ 838.9 million (2024)
  - Expenditure: ₱ 92.38 million (2024)
  - Liabilities: ₱ 179.8 million (2024)

Service provider
  - Electricity: Quezon 2 Electric Cooperative (QUEZELCO 2)
- Time zone: UTC+8 (PST)
- ZIP code: 4339
- PSGC: 0405636000
- IDD : area code: +63 (0)42
- Native languages: Tagalog
- Website: www.polilloquezon.com

Polillo, officially the Municipality of Polillo (Tagalog: Bayan ng Polillo), is a municipality in the province of Quezon, Philippines. According to the 2024 census, it has a population of 31,737 people.

== Etymology ==
Padre Morga wrote that Polillo originated from the Chinese word "Pulilu," which means a beautiful island with plenty of food. It was home to a native barangay-state also known as Pulilu, recorded as such in Chinese chronicles. The island was mentioned as being politically connected to the nation of Sandao, itself a vassal state to the nation of Ma-i. Due to language difficulties, a Spanish friar by the name Padre Domingo eventually changed the name from Pu Li Lu to Polillo.

== History ==
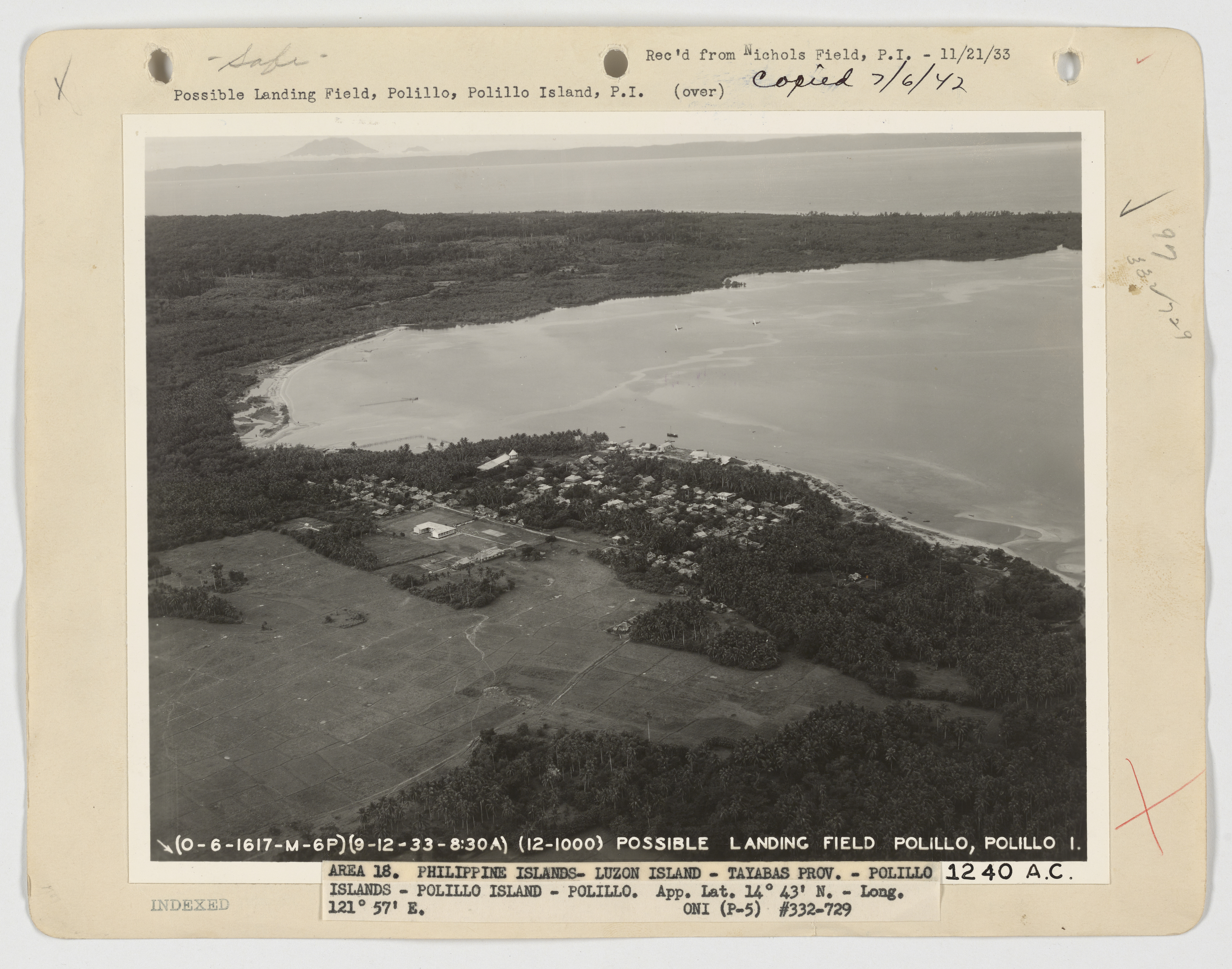
Aerial view of Polillo, 1933

=== Pre-Spanish period ===
Trade relations between the natives of the Polillo Islands and Chinese merchants existed long before the Spanish conquerors came to the archipelago. Pulilu was a sovereign nation that existed in its vicinity, as recorded in Chinese records. Trade was a conglomeration of Malay-Hindu-Chinese-Tagalog.

=== Spanish colonization and early settlement ===
When Juan de Salcedo, a Spanish conqueror, came to Polillo in 1567, he saw a central government fully organized through the Balangay, with a datu who had a direct supervision and control over all the natives. The inhabitants lived in nipa huts.

In 1571, the Spaniards took hold of the islands of Pu Li Lu. Through the leadership of Padre Domingo, a Spanish friar, a chapel was built, where the old Spanish church was later constructed. After one and a half years, the people, through forced labor built a concrete wall to protect the "pueblo" of Pu Li Lu from moro pirate invaders. Watchtowers called "castillos" were erected in the four corners of the pueblo. Today, the remains and ruins of the walls and castillos can be found in the entrances surrounding Barangay Poblacion.

The church was constructed in 1577. Boulders, gravel and sand were mixed with lime produced out of seashells and coral stones. Padre Domingo instigated the planting of sugar cane in San Isidro, San Antonio and San Francisco. Production of molasses was put into full swing.

=== Foundation ===
Spanish conquistadores were assigned to the "pueblo" of Pu Li Lu to promote church construction. The church tower was constructed with priority, so that in 1587, in the early summer of May, two huge bronze bells rang atop. Due to language problems, Padre Domingo changed the name from Pu Li Lu to Polillo.

However, there is inconsistency regarding Polillo's foundation, with some sources and the municipal government claiming it was established as a town in 1587 when the church bells were first rung, while others indicate that it was formally founded as an independent town in 1635 by Franciscan missionaries.

In 1609, Polillo was part of the encomienda of Don Francisco Morante de Nueva. Initially, it served as a visita of Binangonan de Lampon (now Infanta). In 1635, Polillo was officially separated from Binangonan de Lampon and established as an independent town by Franciscan missionaries, with Fray Jose S. de Bernardino appointed as its first leader. In 1658, the town was transferred to the Augustinian Recollects, who managed it until 1703, after which the Franciscan missionaries resumed administration.

Polillo served as the seat of government under Spanish rule for the Polillo Islands, with the present-day towns of Burdeos, Panukulan, Patnanungan, and Jomalig once being part of Polillo as barrios.

=== World War II ===
In 1942, the occupied by the Japanese Imperial forces landed in Polillo.

In 1945, the liberation by the Philippine Commonwealth troops of the 5th and 52nd Infantry Division of the Philippine Commonwealth Army landed in Polillo and fought battles against the Japanese forces in the Battle of Polillo Island during World War II.

=== Territorial changes ===
On June 12, 1948, the barrios of Amot, Aluyon, Burdeos, Calotcot, Karlagan, Magdalo, Patnanungan, San Rafael, and Palasan island separated from Polillo to form the municipality of Burdeos by virtue of Republic Act No. 250. On June 21, 1959, barangays Panukulan, Calasumanga, Libo, and Lipata separated from Polillo to form the municipal district of Panukulan by virtue of Republic Act No. 2452. On June 18, 1961, the barrios such as Bucal, Casuguran, Gango, and Talisoy on Jomalig Island were separated from Polillo to become a separate municipal district named Jumalig (Jomalig) by virtue of Republic Act No. 3372.

=== Contemporary history ===
In 1987, three weeks before the April 18 coup attempt against the national government, cadres of the New People's Army (NPA) attacked the Philippine Constabulary detachment in Polillo Island.

In recent years, government-funded infrastructures were built and private investments in hotel, resorts, services and utilities increased.

On March 26, 2021, two NPA members surrendered to government forces in Barangay Salipsip. On February 21, 2022, the Armed Forces of the Philippines fought an armed encounter with the New People's Army in Barangay Binitbitinan. The NPA eventually withdrew.

== Geography ==
Polillo is located about 29 kilometers (18 mi) off the eastern coast of Luzon. It is bounded by municipality of Panukulan in the northwest and the municipality of Burdeos in the northeastern side of the island. Lamon Bay bounds it at the south, east and west. It is 24 kilometers (15 mi) east of the municipality of Infanta and 27 kilometers (17 mi) east of the municipality of Real. It can be reached by motorboats more or less three hours via Real-Polillo in the Ungos Port and a little bit shorter via, Infanta-Polillo through Infanta Municipal Fish Port.

It is located on the southern part of the eponymous Polillo Island fronting the Philippine Sea and its jurisdiction also includes Balesin Island in Lamon Bay (14°25′30″N 122°02′15″E).

=== Barangays ===
Polillo is politically subdivided into 20 barangays, as indicated below. Each barangay consists of puroks and some have sitios.

- Anawan
- Atulayan
- Balesin
- Bañadero
- Binibitinan
- Bislian
- Bucao
- Canicanian
- Kalubakis
- Languyin
- Libjo
- Pamatdan
- Pilion
- Pinaglubayan
- Poblacion
- Sabang
- Salipsip
- Sibulan
- Taluong
- Tamulaya-Anibong

=== Climate ===
Climate data for Polillo, Quezon
| Month | Jan | Feb | Mar | Apr | May | Jun | Jul | Aug | Sep | Oct | Nov | Dec | Year |
|---|---|---|---|---|---|---|---|---|---|---|---|---|---|
| Mean daily maximum °C (°F) | 26 (79) | 27 (81) | 28 (82) | 30 (86) | 31 (88) | 30 (86) | 29 (84) | 29 (84) | 29 (84) | 29 (84) | 28 (82) | 26 (79) | 29 (83) |
| Mean daily minimum °C (°F) | 22 (72) | 21 (70) | 22 (72) | 23 (73) | 24 (75) | 25 (77) | 24 (75) | 24 (75) | 24 (75) | 24 (75) | 23 (73) | 22 (72) | 23 (74) |
| Average precipitation mm (inches) | 40 (1.6) | 33 (1.3) | 35 (1.4) | 38 (1.5) | 138 (5.4) | 190 (7.5) | 242 (9.5) | 216 (8.5) | 224 (8.8) | 200 (7.9) | 114 (4.5) | 94 (3.7) | 1,564 (61.6) |
| Average rainy days | 12.2 | 9.0 | 11.0 | 11.7 | 21.5 | 24.0 | 27.2 | 26.1 | 26.8 | 22.3 | 16.3 | 15.1 | 223.2 |
Source: Meteoblue

== Demographics ==
Population census of Polillo
| Year | Pop. | ±% p.a. |
|---|---|---|
| 1903 | 2,164 | — |
| 1918 | 4,245 | +4.59% |
| 1939 | 8,084 | +3.11% |
| 1948 | 7,576 | −0.72% |
| 1960 | 11,978 | +3.89% |
| 1970 | 16,721 | +3.39% |
| 1975 | 20,058 | +3.72% |
| 1980 | 20,565 | +0.50% |
| 1990 | 23,183 | +1.21% |
| 1995 | 24,626 | +1.14% |
| 2000 | 24,105 | −0.46% |
| 2007 | 27,912 | +2.04% |
| 2010 | 28,125 | +0.28% |
| 2015 | 30,582 | +1.61% |
| 2020 | 31,908 | +0.90% |
| 2024 | 31,737 | −0.13% |
Source: Philippine Statistics Authority

== Economy ==
Poverty incidence of Polillo (%)

Source: Philippine Statistics Authority

== Culture ==
=== Town's founding anniversary ===
The town of Polillo is celebrating its founding anniversary every March 18 more than 400 years ago. The celebration last for at least three days. Starting from March 17, there are different celebrations held in the town proper including the "Gabi ng Parangal" (Coronation Night) of the Town's Beauty, Binibining Polillo and all the ladies representing different barangays.

March 18 is the most awaited day of the celebration where a big parade can be seen by all the natives and guest. The "Parada" includes all the schools, non-government organizations, local government units, all the barangay participants and more. The most awaited groups in the parade are the "Banda" - School Bands - from different schools and school levels. Celebration will continue until night fall with the "Sayawan" at the town plaza.

=== Patronal fiesta ===
March 19 is the Feast of St. Joseph, the Patron Saint of the town. The celebration starts from a procession together with all the patron saints of all the sitios and barangays and all devotees of Saint Joseph. Including all the sitio's and barangay's patron saints in the procession is known as "dapit". Many believes that this celebration of the Feast of Saint Joseph plays big part from the town's safety against nature disaster specially typhoons. It has something to do with the church history where those saints served as protector along the region. Devotees of St. Joseph now turns the old "St. Joseph Parish" into "Prelature Shrine of St. Joseph" as ordered by Infanta Bishop Rolando Tria Tirona in 2010.

== Transportation ==
Getting to Polillo from Manila takes around six hours of travel by land and by sea. The first segment of the trip involves travelling to Ungos Port in Real, Quezon via the Pililla-Famy-Real Road. Marikina-Infanta Highway is also another route to Ungos Port. Raymond Bus, with its terminal located along Legarda Street, Manila, has regular scheduled trips to Real, Quezon.

There are two regular boat trips from Real to Polillo. The first trip usually leaves at 7:30 AM PHT as the bus passengers coming from Lucena and Manila try to catch it up. The next boat leaves at 10:00 AM. The boats are outrigger types powered with a surplus truck engine. The return trips from Polillo are at 5:00 AM and 1:00 PM. The trip from Ungos Port to Polillo usually takes three hours.

There are passenger ferries that depart from Dinahican Port in Infanta to Barangay Macnit in Polillo.

There are also boat trips to Balesin Island and Polillo from Atimonan's port.

There are also passenger ferries from Real, Quezon. These ferries are divided into two categories by the locals: “Roros” and “fastcrafts”

== Education ==
The Polillo Schools District Office governs all educational institutions within the municipality. It oversees the management and operations of all private and public, from primary to secondary schools.

=== Primary and elementary schools ===
- Anawan Elementary School
- Balesin Elementary School
- Bigyan Elementary School
- Binibitinan Elementary School
- Bislian Elementary School
- Bucao Elementary School
- Canicanian Elementary School
- Kalubakis Elementary School
- Languyin Elementary School
- Libjo Elementary School
- Macnit Elementary School
- Mt. Carmel School of Polillo
- Pamatdan Elementary School
- Pelion Elementary School
- Pinaglubayan Elementary School
- Polillo Adventist Institute Elem School
- Polillo Central School
- Sabang Elementary School
- Salipsip Elementary School
- Sibulan Elementary School
- Taluong Elementary School
- Tamulaya Elementary School

=== Secondary schools ===
- Balesin Integrated School
- Polillo Adventist Institute (High School)
- Polillo National High School
- Polillo National High School (Languyin Ext)
- Sabang National High School
- Taluong National High School

== See also ==
- Polillo Islands
