= Jomalig =

Municipality in Quezon, Philippines

- Municipality
- Municipality of Jomalig
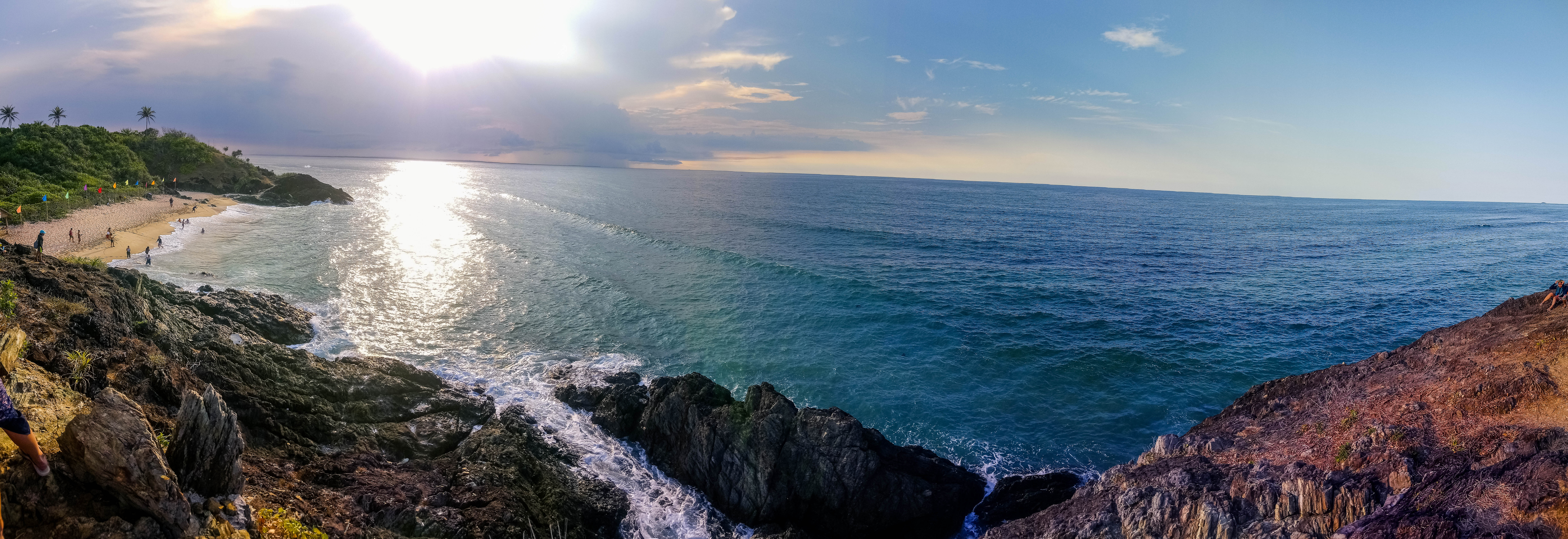
- Lingayen Cove

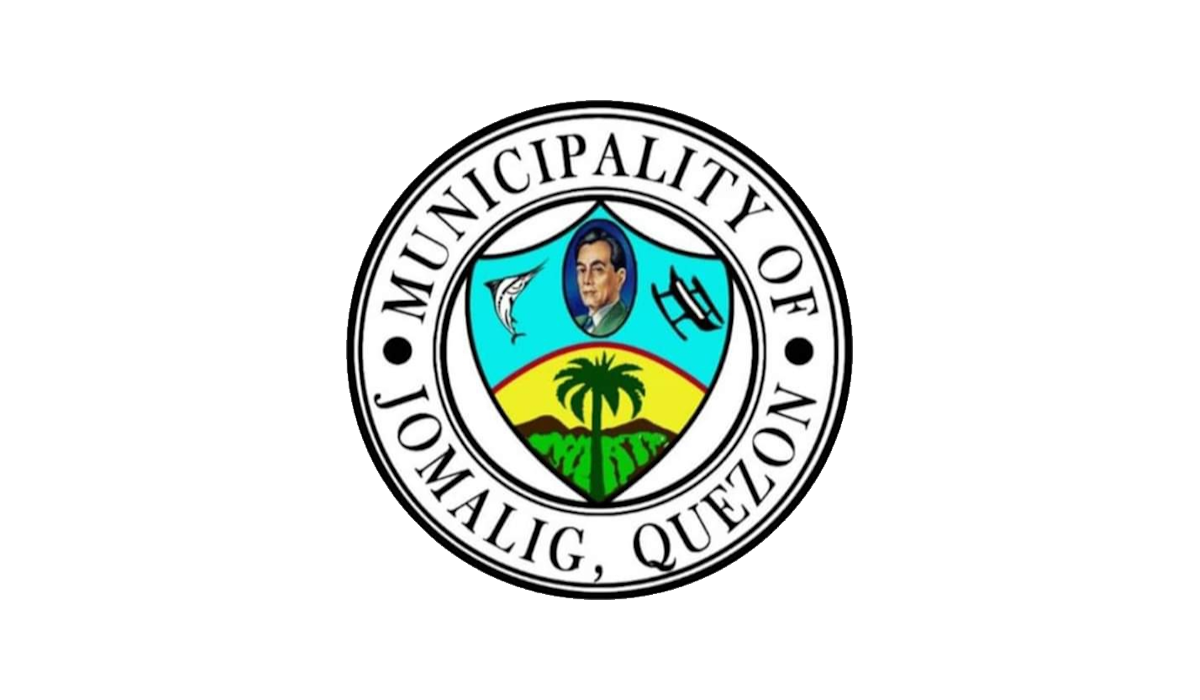
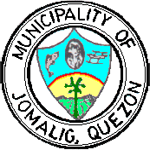
- Flag Seal

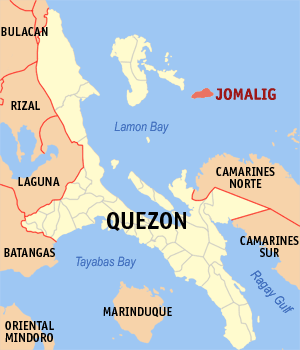
- Map of Quezon with Jomalig highlighted
- Interactive map of Jomalig
- Location within the Philippines
- Coordinates: 14°41′46″N 122°19′52″E
- Country: Philippines
- Region: Calabarzon
- Province: Quezon
- District: 1st district
- Founded: June 18, 1961
- Barangays: 5 (see Barangays)

Government
  - Type: Sangguniang Bayan
  - Mayor: Nelmar T. Sarmiento
  - Vice Mayor: Charito A. Manlangit
  - Representative: Wilfrido Mark M. Enverga
  - Municipal Council: Members: Arturo D. Tapado Jr.; Ederlina A. Compendio; Primitivo F. Balino; Robert T. Candelaria; Zeresh D. Patal; Merlinda S. Mampusti; Maribel D. Mercado; Ruben T. Belda
  - Electorate: 5,629 voters (2025)

Area
  - Total: 56.65 km^{2} (21.87 sq mi)
- Elevation: 0 m (0 ft)
- Highest elevation: 96 m (315 ft)
- Lowest elevation: 0 m (0 ft)

Population (2024 census)
  - Total: 7,884
  - Density: 139.2/km^{2} (360.4/sq mi)
  - Households: 1,834
- Demonym: Jomaligin

Economy
  - Income class: 5th municipal income class
  - Poverty incidence: 20.55% (2023)
  - Revenue: ₱ 85.9 million (2024)
  - Assets: ₱ 153.4 million (2024)
  - Expenditure: ₱ 25.2 million (2024)
  - Liabilities: ₱ 53.18 million (2024)

Service provider
  - Electricity: Quezon 2 Electric Cooperative (QUEZELCO 2)
- Time zone: UTC+8 (PST)
- ZIP code: 4342
- PSGC: 0405621000
- IDD : area code: +63 (0)42
- Native languages: Tagalog

Jomalig (Tagalog pronunciation: [hoˈmaː.lɪɡ] hoo-MAH-leeg), officially the Municipality of Jomalig (Tagalog: Bayan ng Jomalig), is a municipality in the Polillo Islands in the province of Quezon, Philippines.

According to the 2024 census, it has a population of 7,884 people. It is the least populated municipality in the province.

== Etymology ==
Although many old Jomaligins (locals) do not know the origin of the island's name, a myth is preserved in oral tradition concerning the history of Jomalig. This is recited every 18 June, Culture and Art Day, with history teacher Tessie Basto and the local civil registrar Bernadette Cuevas still among those who remember the etiological myth.

The legend is a datu who lived on the island with his beautiful daughter, whom a young man from a neighboring island sought to marry. The datu forbade it, as he would only give the princess if the young man could roam the island in just one day and successfully shoot three fish in every pond on the island.

The young man took on the challenge, and as he was about to finish roaming the island, he nearly died. Arriving hopeless at the endpoint, he asked the princess to kiss him as his only reward. She kissed the young man, and witnesses shouted "Humalík!" (Tagalog, “Had kissed"), hence the island's name.

It was eventually corrupted to Jomalig and despite the Spanish orthography, some elderly residents claim the Americans changed it when the United States occupied the Philippines.

== History ==
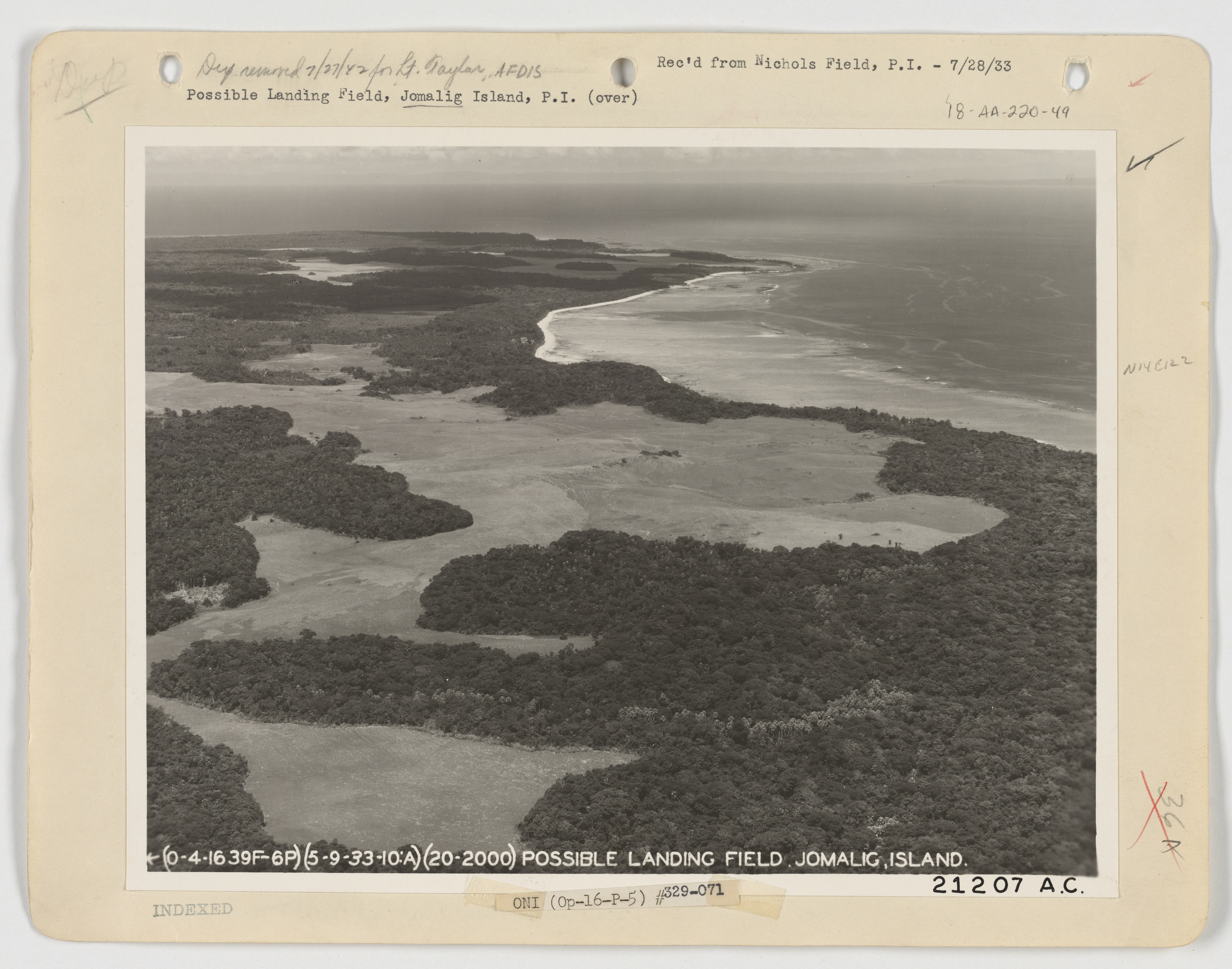
Aerial view of Jomalig Island, 1933

Jomalig Island was previously part of the adjacent island town of Polillo. The geographical location of Jomalig made the district difficult to recognize and establish, which further contributed to its slow development. In 1952, it was subdivided into agricultural and residential lots, as sponsored by Polillo Mayor Mamerto Azarías and the Municipal Council.

At the inauguration by then-Congressman Manuel S. Enverga (Quezon–1st), civic leaders worked towards agricultural development, attracting migrants from the Bicol Region to the southeast. On June 18, 1961, Jomalig Island was made a separate municipal district by virtue of Republic Act No. 3372. Originally spelled as Jumalig, it comprised four barrios: Bucal, Casuguran, Gango, and Talisoy.

== Geography ==
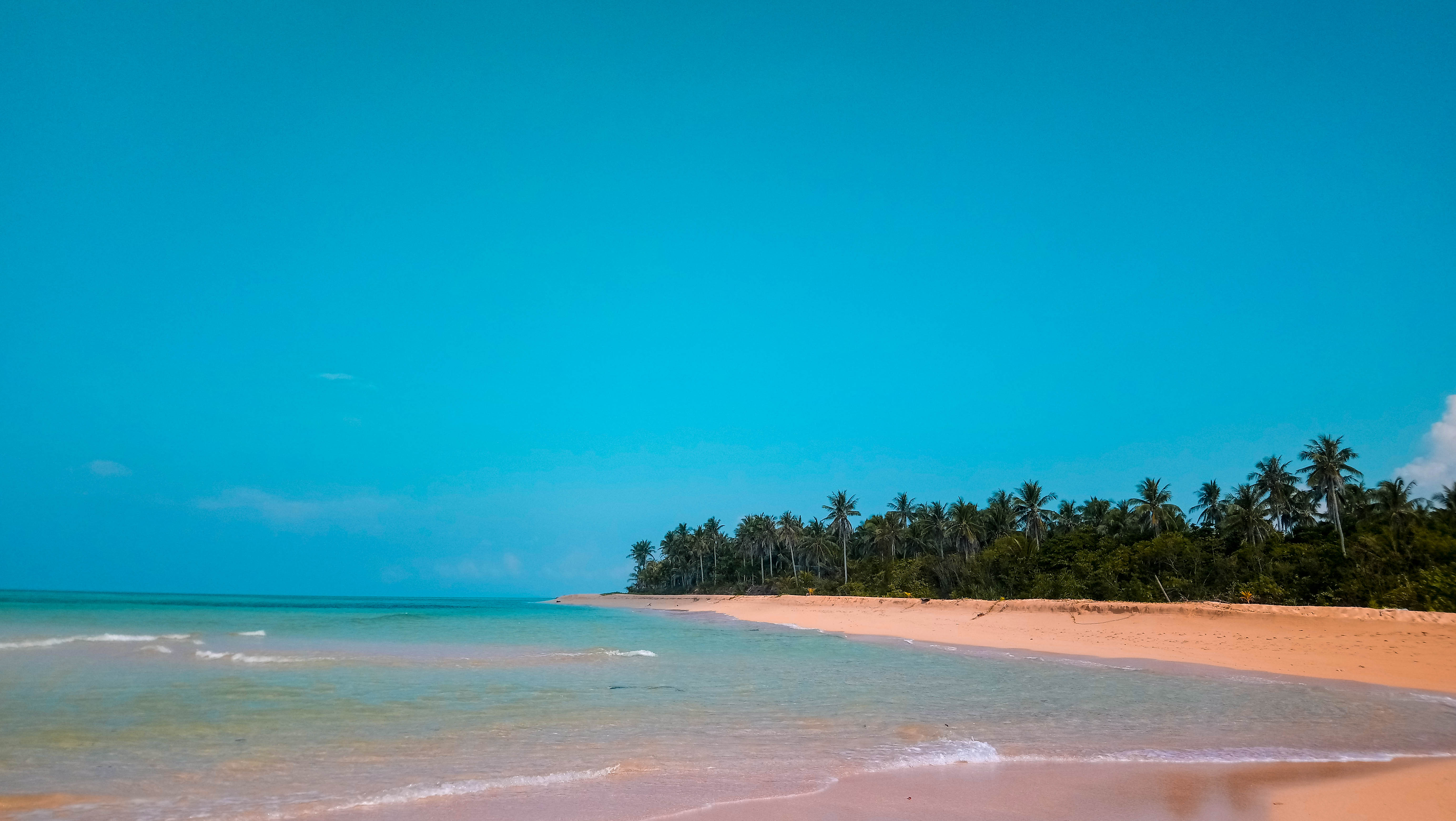
A beach in Jomalig

Jomalig Island is about 75 nautical miles (139 km) southeast of the Polillo Islands, and is considered one of the smallest and more distant island municipalities of Quezon Province. Most land in Jomalig is dedicated to agricultural use, with a majority of the islanders dependent on coconut products, rice, fish and root crops. Its land area is at 5,665 hectares (14,000 acres). Some of its lands have been alienated and the farmland is mostly devoted to coconut, of which there is 3,104.0 hectares (7,670 acres), with 2,605 hectares (6,440 acres) being forests, swamps and grassland.

The inhabitants of this municipality originate from different ethnic groups similar to those of Eastern Samar, Bohol, Sorsogon, Catanduanes, Camarines Sur and Camarines Norte and mainland Quezon Province.

=== Barangays ===
Jomalig is politically subdivided into five barangays. Each barangay consists of puroks and some have sitios.

- Apad
- Bukal
- Casuguran
- Gango
- Talisoy (Poblacion)

=== Climate ===
Climate data for Jomalig, Quezon
Month	Jan	Feb	Mar	Apr	May	Jun	Jul	Aug	Sep	Oct	Nov	Dec	Year
Mean daily maximum °C (°F)	26 (79)	27 (81)	29 (84)	31 (88)	31 (88)	30 (86)	29 (84)	29 (84)	29 (84)	29 (84)	28 (82)	27 (81)	29 (84)
Mean daily minimum °C (°F)	22 (72)	22 (72)	22 (72)	23 (73)	24 (75)	24 (75)	24 (75)	24 (75)	24 (75)	24 (75)	24 (75)	23 (73)	23 (74)
Average precipitation mm (inches)	51 (2.0)	35 (1.4)	37 (1.5)	39 (1.5)	91 (3.6)	131 (5.2)	168 (6.6)	132 (5.2)	162 (6.4)	184 (7.2)	166 (6.5)	101 (4.0)	1,297 (51.1)
Average rainy days	13.4	10.5	11.8	12.0	19.8	24.1	26.7	25.1	25.3	23.9	21.2	17.6	231.4
Source: Meteoblue

== Demographics ==
Population census of Jomalig
Year	Pop.	±% p.a.
1970	2,862	—
1975	4,014	+7.02%
1980	3,972	−0.21%
1990	4,542	+1.35%
1995	4,371	−0.72%
2000	5,817	+6.32%
2007	6,111	+0.68%
2010	6,884	+4.43%
2015	7,417	+1.43%
2020	7,667	+0.70%
2024	7,884	+0.67%
Source: Philippine Statistics Authority

== Economy ==
Poverty incidence of Jomalig (%)

Source: Philippine Statistics Authority

== Education ==
The Patnanungan-Jomalig Schools District Office governs all educational institutions within the municipality. It oversees the management and operations of all private and public, from primary to secondary schools.

=== Primary and elementary schools ===
- Apad Elementary School
- Bukal Elementary School
- Casuguran Elementary School
- Gango Elementary School
- Jomalig Central Elementary School

=== Secondary schools ===
- Apad Jomalig National High School
- Jomalig National High School

== See also ==
- List of islands of the Philippines
