= Burdeos =

Municipality in Quezon, Philippines

- Municipality
- Municipality of Burdeos
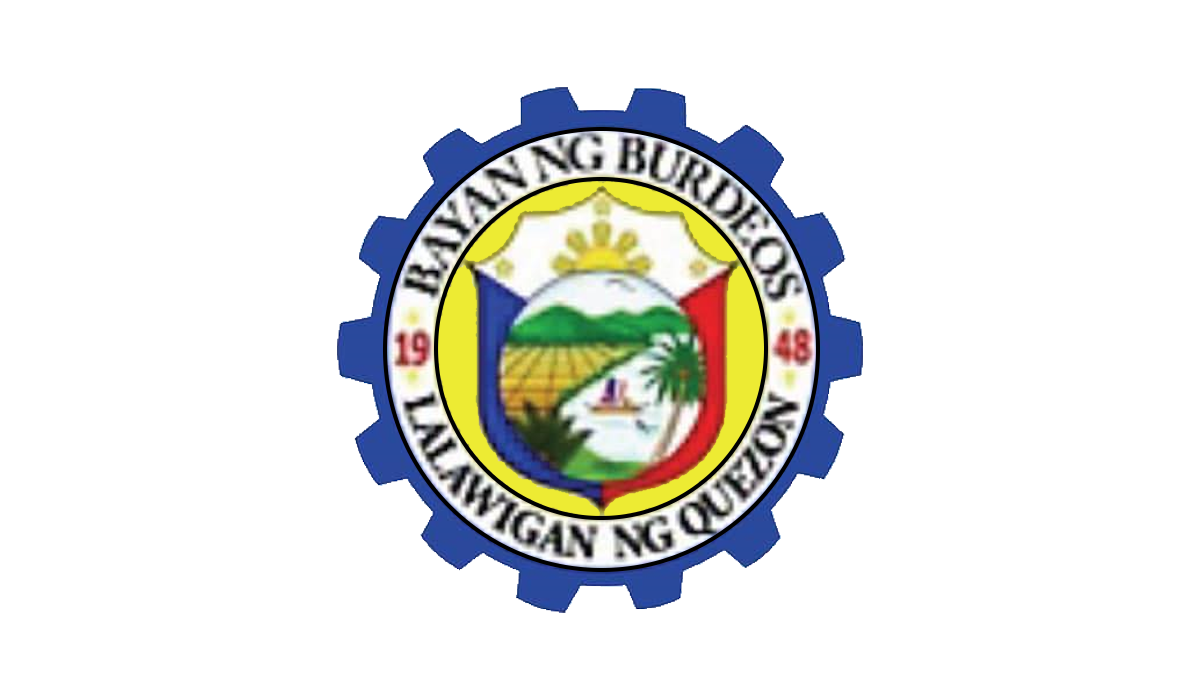
- Flag Seal
- Etymology: Spanish for Bordeaux
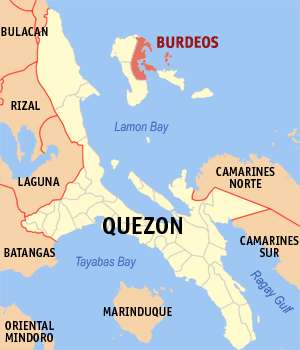
- Map of Quezon with Burdeos highlighted
- Interactive map of Burdeos
- Location within the Philippines
- Coordinates: 14°50′37″N 121°58′11″E
- Country: Philippines
- Region: Calabarzon
- Province: Quezon
- District: 1st district
- Founded: June 12, 1948
- Named for: Bordeaux, France
- Barangays: 13 (see Barangays)

Government
  - Type: Sangguniang Bayan
  - Mayor: Freddie C. Aman
  - Vice Mayor: Gina P. Gonzales
  - Representative: Wilfrido Mark M. Enverga
  - Municipal Council: Members: Edison B. Agarao; Daniel C. Suarez; Romulo R. Avila Jr.; Obren M. Tan; Denmark C. Ungriano; Melvin P. Avenilla; Mellisa P. Encomienda; Herminia A. Lucero
  - Electorate: 14,272 voters (2025)

Area
  - Total: 199.82 km^{2} (77.15 sq mi)
- Elevation: 48 m (157 ft)
- Highest elevation: 273 m (896 ft)
- Lowest elevation: 0 m (0 ft)

Population (2024 census)
  - Total: 22,742
  - Density: 113.81/km^{2} (294.77/sq mi)
  - Households: 5,608
- Demonym: Burdeosin

Economy
  - Income class: 3rd municipal income class
  - Poverty incidence: 19.66% (2023)
  - Revenue: ₱ 163.6 million (2024)
  - Assets: ₱ 635.8 million (2024)
  - Expenditure: ₱ 15.61 million (2024)
  - Liabilities: ₱ 136.3 million (2024)

Service provider
  - Electricity: Quezon 2 Electric Cooperative (QUEZELCO 2)
- Time zone: UTC+8 (PST)
- ZIP code: 4340
- PSGC: 0405606000
- IDD : area code: +63 (0)42
- Native languages: Tagalog
- Website: www.burdeos.gov.ph

Burdeos, officially the Municipality of Burdeos (Tagalog: Bayan ng Burdeos), is a municipality in the province of Quezon, Philippines. According to the 2024 census, it has a population of 22,742 people.

== History ==
Burdeos was established on June 12, 1948 from the barrios of Burdeos, Amot, Aluyon, Calotcot, Karlagan, Magdalo, Patnanungan, San Rafael, and Palasan island, which were previously part of the town of Polillo. Later on June 18, 1961, barrios Amaga, Busdak, Kilugan, Lood, Patnanungan Norte and Patnanungan Sur were separated from Burdeos to form the new municipal district of Patnanungan.

== Geography ==
The municipality of Burdeos is geographically located in the coastal part of Polillo Island in the first Congressional District of the Province of Quezon, a town that is trapezoidal in shape, facing the vast Pacific Ocean with an area of approximately 20,948 hectares (51,760 acres). Burdeos is composed of 13 barangays, three of which are island barangays, with 25 islands which are potential tourist spots. The territorial water of this municipality is a good fishing ground with abundant aquatic resources.

=== Barangays ===
Burdeos is politically subdivided into 13 barangays, as indicated below. Each barangay consists of puroks and some have sitios.

- Aluyon
- Amot
- Anibawan
- Bonifacio
- Cabugao
- Cabungalunan (including Anirong Island and Anawan Island)
- Calutcot (with surrounding islands)
- Caniwan
- Carlagan (including Buguitan Island)
- Mabini
- Palasan (including Icol and Cabalao islands)
- Poblacion
- San Rafael

=== Climate ===
Climate data for Burdeos, Quezon
Month	Jan	Feb	Mar	Apr	May	Jun	Jul	Aug	Sep	Oct	Nov	Dec	Year
Mean daily maximum °C (°F)	26 (79)	27 (81)	28 (82)	30 (86)	31 (88)	30 (86)	30 (86)	30 (86)	29 (84)	29 (84)	28 (82)	26 (79)	29 (84)
Mean daily minimum °C (°F)	21 (70)	21 (70)	22 (72)	23 (73)	24 (75)	25 (77)	24 (75)	24 (75)	24 (75)	23 (73)	23 (73)	22 (72)	23 (73)
Average precipitation mm (inches)	33 (1.3)	26 (1.0)	26 (1.0)	30 (1.2)	109 (4.3)	165 (6.5)	187 (7.4)	163 (6.4)	162 (6.4)	147 (5.8)	85 (3.3)	74 (2.9)	1,207 (47.5)
Average rainy days	10.2	7.6	9.6	10.5	19.9	23.6	26.0	24.8	24.5	19.6	12.7	13.0	202
Source: Meteoblue

== Demographics ==
Population census of Burdeos
Year	Pop.	±% p.a.
1948	3,142	—
1960	7,855	+7.93%
1970	10,472	+2.91%
1975	14,229	+6.34%
1980	14,888	+0.91%
1990	17,983	+1.91%
1995	20,246	+2.25%
2000	19,635	−0.65%
2007	23,568	+2.55%
2010	24,166	+0.92%
2015	26,760	+1.96%
2020	24,644	−1.72%
2024	22,742	−1.91%
Source: Philippine Statistics Authority

== Economy ==
Poverty incidence of Burdeos (%)

Source: Philippine Statistics Authority

== Government ==
=== Local government ===
Elected municipal officials (2022-2025):

- Mayor: Freddie C. Aman
- Vice Mayor: Gina P. Gonzales
- Councilors:
  - Edison B. Agarao
  - Daniel C. Suarez
  - Romulo R. Avila Jr.
  - Obren M. Tan
  - Denmark C. Ungriano
  - Melvin P. Avenilla
  - Mellisa P. Encomienda
  - Herminia A. Lucero

== Education ==
The Burdeos Schools District Office governs all educational institutions within the municipality. It oversees the management and operations of all private and public, from primary to secondary schools.

=== Primary and elementary schools ===
- Aluyon Elementary School
- Amot Elementary School
- Anibawan Elementary School
- Bonifacio Elementary School
- Burdeos Central School
- Cabugao Elementary School
- Cabungalunan Elementary School
- Caniwan Elementary School
- Mabini Elementary School
- Palasan Elementary School
- San Rafael Elementary School
- Tulan Elementary School

=== Secondary schools ===
- Burdeos National High School
- Bonifacio National High School
- Carlagan Integrated School
- Calutcot Integrated School
- Mount Carmel High School

== See also ==
- Polillo Islands
