= Enverga =

Enverga is a surname. Notable people with the surname include:

- Manuel S. Enverga (1909–1981), Filipino politician
- Mark Enverga, Filipino politician
- Tobias Enverga (1955–2017), Canadian senator
