= Mauban =

Municipality in Quezon, Philippines

- Municipality
- Municipality of Mauban
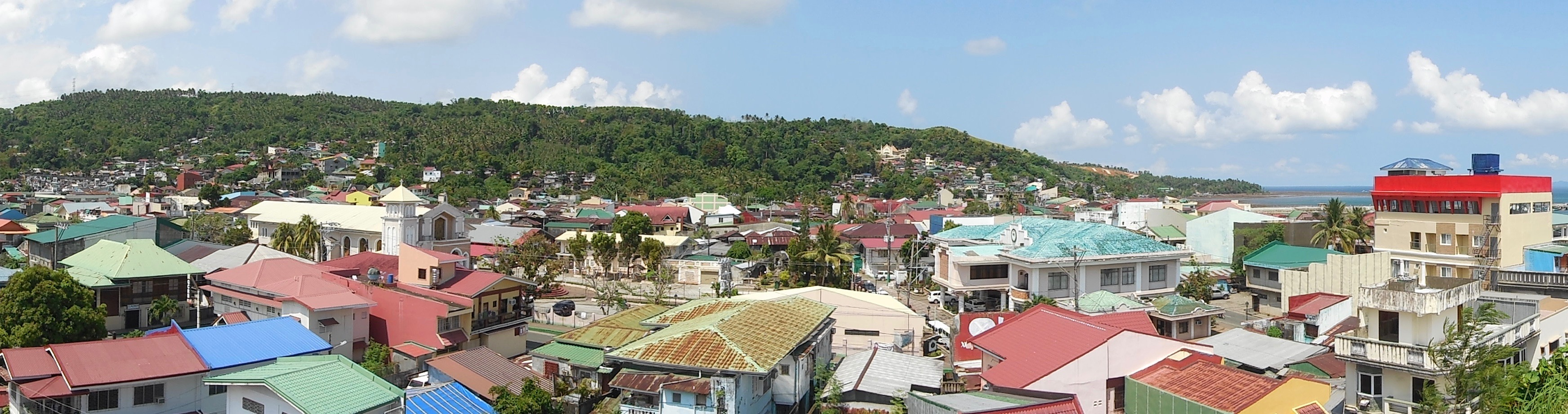
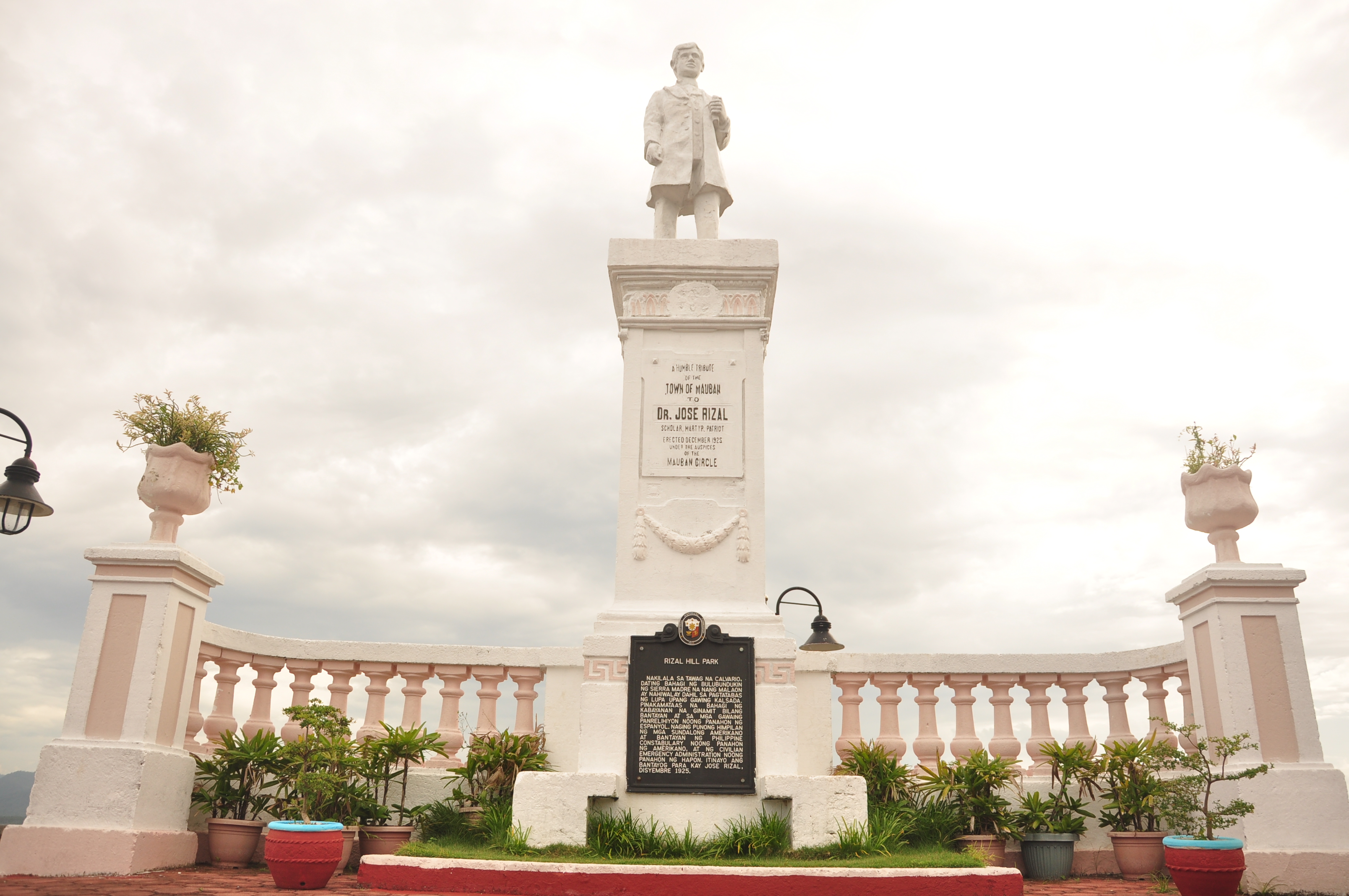
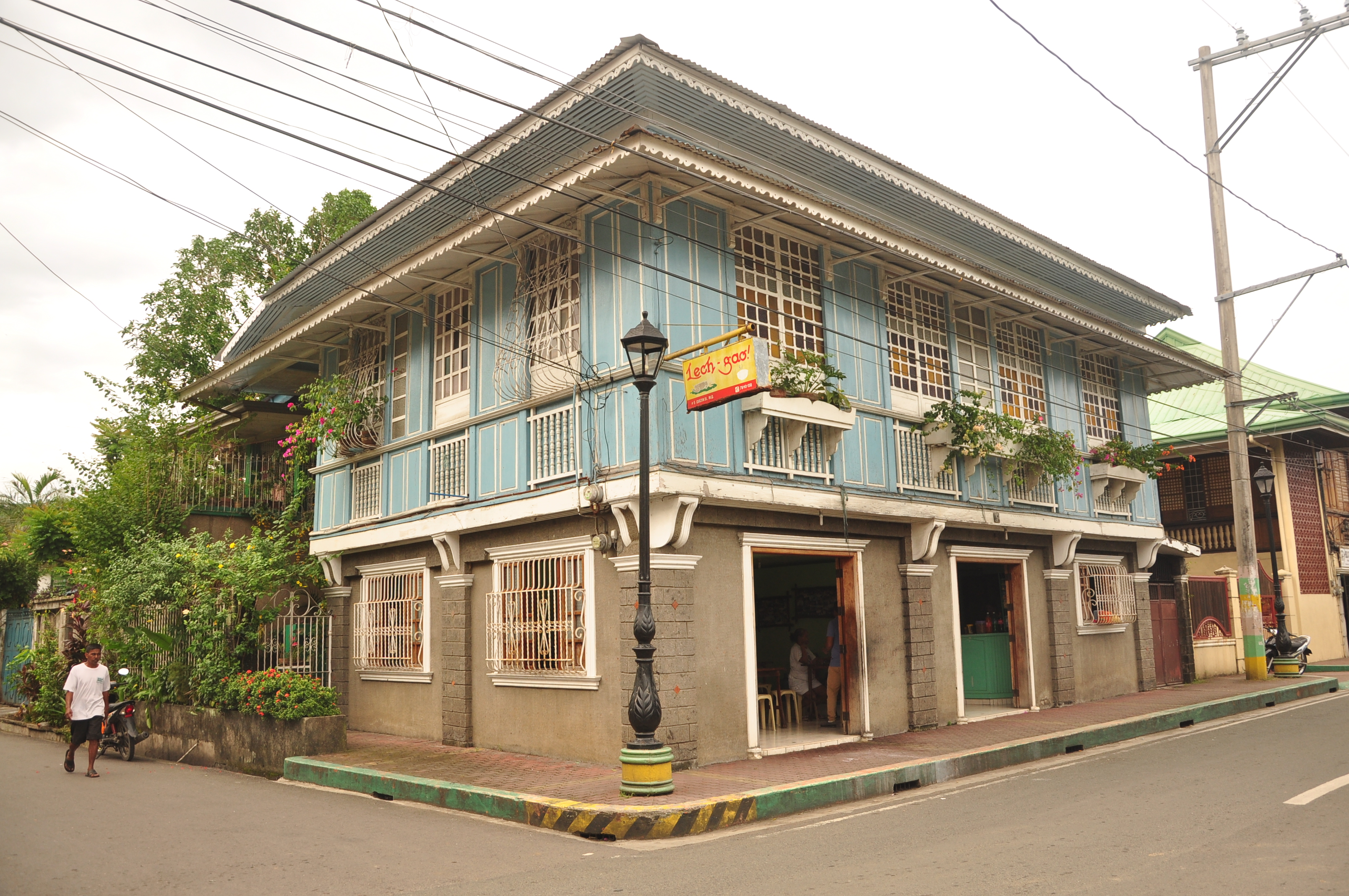
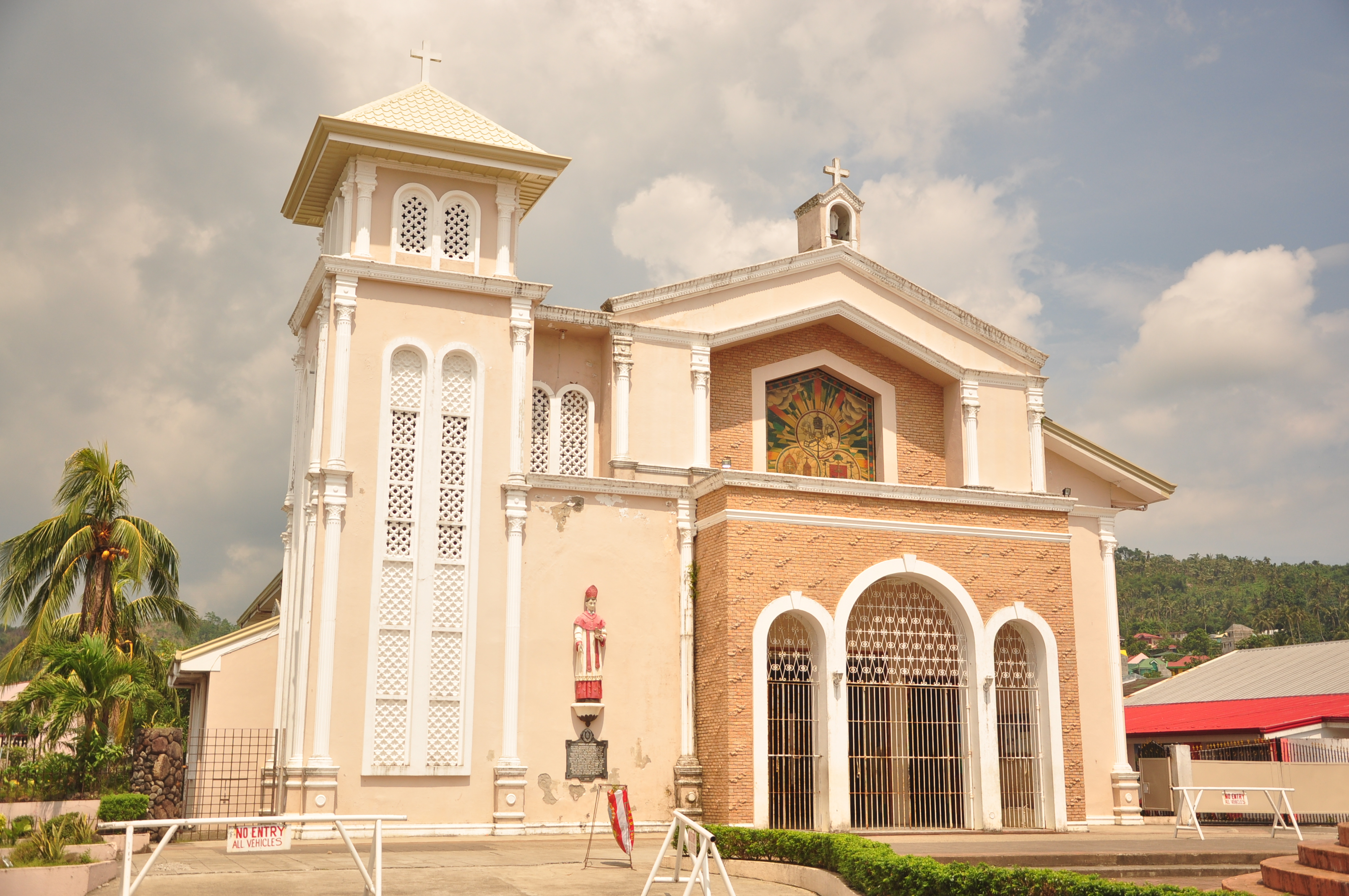
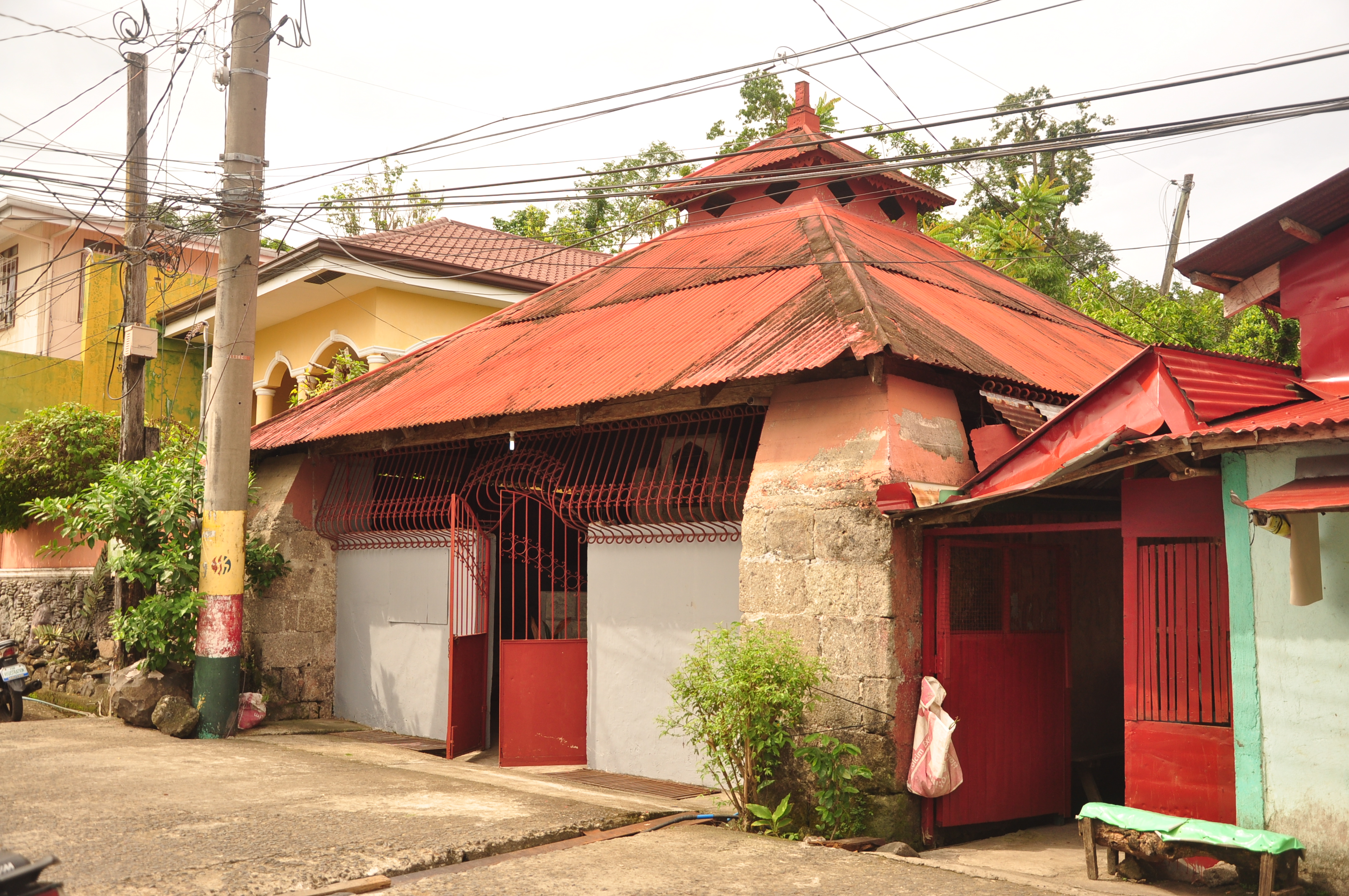
- (From top, left to right:) Panoramic view of Mauban town center from Rizal Hill Park; Rizal Monument at Rizal Hill Park; Pansacola Ancestral House; Saint Bonaventure Parish Church; public bath built in 1725

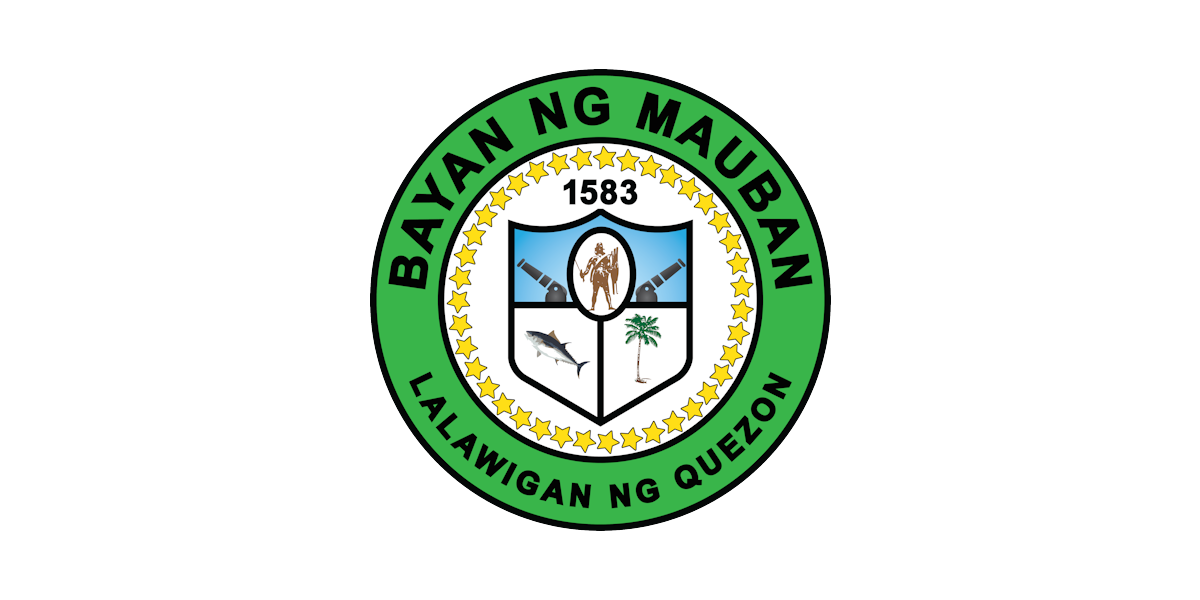
- Flag Seal
- Nickname: Home of the Boracay of the Pacific
- Motto(s): Maubanin First, Epektibong Pamamalakad at Pagpapaunlad ng Mauban, Babalik-balikan ang Bayan ng Mauban
- Anthem: Himno ng Mauban
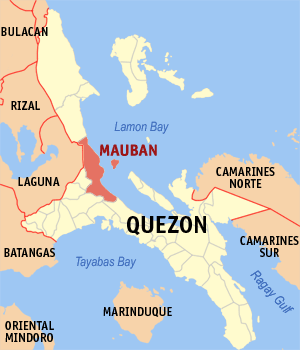
- Map of Quezon with Mauban highlighted
- Interactive map of Mauban
- Location within the Philippines
- Coordinates: 14°11′28″N 121°43′51″E
- Country: Philippines
- Region: Calabarzon
- Province: Quezon
- District: 1st district
- Founded: July 15, 1583
- Barangays: 40 (see Barangays)

Government
  - Type: Sangguniang Bayan
  - Mayor: Erwin Dwight C. Pastrana
  - Vice Mayor: Alween M. Sardea
  - Representative: Wilfrido Mark M. Enverga
  - Municipal Council: Members: Kathryn M. Gapasangra; Nathaniel E. Calucin; Abelardo A. Mandrique; Ronel E. Manaog; Yolanda V. Santayana; Melanie G. Pasamba; Waldrof M. Llamas; Raquel M. Almacen
  - Electorate: 48,534 voters (2025)

Area
  - Total: 415.98 km^{2} (160.61 sq mi)
- Elevation: 58 m (190 ft)
- Highest elevation: 376 m (1,234 ft)
- Lowest elevation: 0 m (0 ft)

Population (2024 census)
  - Total: 70,135
  - Density: 168.60/km^{2} (436.68/sq mi)
  - Households: 17,587
- Demonym: Maubanin

Economy
  - Income class: 1st municipal income class
  - Poverty incidence: 7.33% (2023)
  - Revenue: ₱ 982 million (2024)
  - Assets: ₱ 3,089 million (2024)
  - Expenditure: ₱ 447.8 million (2024)
  - Liabilities: ₱ 1,038 million (2024)

Service provider
  - Electricity: Manila Electric Company (Meralco)
- Time zone: UTC+8 (PST)
- ZIP code: 4330
- PSGC: 0405627000
- IDD : area code: +63 (0)42
- Native languages: Tagalog
- Website: www.mauban.gov.ph

Mauban, officially the Municipality of Mauban (Tagalog: Bayan ng Mauban), is a municipality in the province of Quezon, Philippines. According to the 2024 census, it has a population of 70,135 people.

== Etymology ==
The town got its name from the local word uban referring to white hair which early settlers believe it as a symbol of wisdom.

== History ==
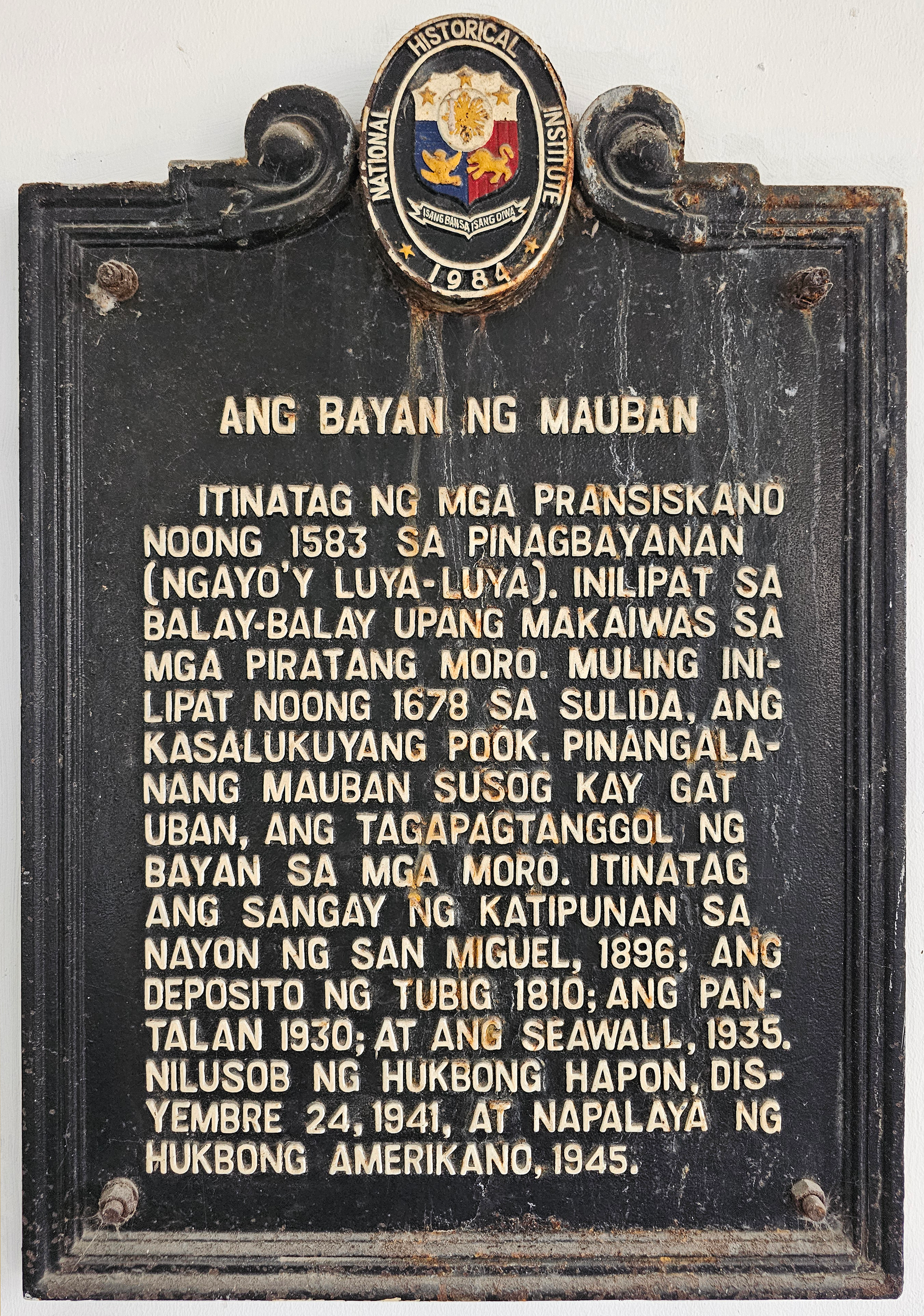
National historical marker installed at the town hall in 1984

Established as a municipality in 1583, Mauban developed under the Spanish colonial government structure.

== Geography ==
Mauban is 170 kilometres (110 mi) southeast of Manila and 40 kilometres (25 mi) north of Lucena, the provincial capital.

=== Barangays ===
Mauban is politically subdivided into 40 barangays, as indicated below. Each barangay consists of puroks and some have sitios.

- Bagong Bayan (Poblacion)
- Daungan (Poblacion)
- Lual (Poblacion)
- Mabato (Poblacion)
- Rizaliana (Poblacion)
- Sadsaran (Poblacion)
- Abo-abo
- Alitap
- Baao
- Balaybalay
- Bató
- Cagbalete I
- Cagbalete II
- Cagsiay I
- Cagsiay II
- Cagsiay III
- Concepción
- Liwayway
- Lucutan
- Lual Rural
- Luya-luya
- Macasin
- Polo
- Remedios I
- Remedios II
- Rosario
- San Gabriel (formerly Tubog)
- San Isidro
- San José
- San Lorenzo
- San Miguel
- San Rafael
- San Roque
- San Vicente
- Santa Lucía
- Santo Ángel
- Santo Niño
- Santol
- Soledad
- Tapucan

=== Climate ===
Climate data for Mauban, Quezon
Month	Jan	Feb	Mar	Apr	May	Jun	Jul	Aug	Sep	Oct	Nov	Dec	Year
Mean daily maximum °C (°F)	26 (79)	27 (81)	29 (84)	31 (88)	31 (88)	30 (86)	29 (84)	29 (84)	29 (84)	29 (84)	28 (82)	26 (79)	29 (84)
Mean daily minimum °C (°F)	22 (72)	22 (72)	22 (72)	23 (73)	24 (75)	24 (75)	24 (75)	24 (75)	24 (75)	24 (75)	23 (73)	23 (73)	23 (74)
Average precipitation mm (inches)	83 (3.3)	55 (2.2)	44 (1.7)	37 (1.5)	90 (3.5)	123 (4.8)	145 (5.7)	125 (4.9)	135 (5.3)	166 (6.5)	163 (6.4)	152 (6.0)	1,318 (51.8)
Average rainy days	15.1	10.8	11.9	11.4	19.9	23.7	26.3	23.9	23.9	22.1	20.2	18.6	227.8
Source: Meteoblue

== Demographics ==
Population census of Mauban
Year	Pop.	±% p.a.
1903	12,021	—
1918	12,516	+0.27%
1939	14,832	+0.81%
1948	14,417	−0.31%
1960	18,703	+2.19%
1970	29,822	+4.77%
1975	32,653	+1.84%
1980	37,814	+2.98%
1990	43,740	+1.47%
1995	47,442	+1.53%
2000	50,134	+1.19%
2007	55,866	+1.50%
2010	61,141	+3.34%
2015	63,819	+0.82%
2020	71,081	+2.29%
2024	70,135	−0.32%
Source: Philippine Statistics Authority

== Economy ==
Poverty incidence of Mauban (%)

Source: Philippine Statistics Authority

In 2000, the Quezon Power Project, a 440 megawatt coal power plant was constructed to bring consistent power to the area. It was the first privately built, owned, and operated power generating facility in the Philippines.

== Education ==
There are two schools district offices which govern all educational institutions within the municipality. They oversee the management and operations of all private and public, from primary to secondary schools. These are Mauban North Schools District and Mauban South Schools District.

Mauban also has two private schools, Central Quezon Academy in Barangay Mabato and Mother Perpetua Parochial School in Barangay Lual Poblacion. It also has one college, Pambayang Kolehiyo ng Mauban.

=== Primary and elementary schools ===
- Alitap Elementary School
- Bagong Bayan Elementary School
- Balaybalay Elementary School
- Cagbalete I Annex Elementary School
- Cagbalete I Elementary School
- Cagbalete II (P.H. Dela Costa) Elementary School
- Cagsiay I Elementary School
- Cagsiay II Elementary School
- Cagsiay III Annex Elementary School
- Cagsiay III Elementary School
- Concepcion Elementary School
- Doña Aurora Elementary School
- Liwayway Elementary School
- Mabato Elementary School
- Mauban North Elementary School I
- Mauban North Elementary School II
- Mauban South Central Elementary School I
- Mauban South Central Elementary School II
- Remedios I Elementary School
- Remedios I Preschool (Annex) Bulusok
- Remedios II Elementary School
- San Lorenzo Elementary School
- San Miguel- San Rafael Elementary School
- SWA Elementary School
- Plaridel Elementary School
- Polo Elementary School
- Rosario Elementary School
- San Jose Elementary School
- Santa Lucia Elementary School
- Santo Niño Elementary School

=== Secondary schools ===
- Cagbalete Island National High School
- Cagsiay I National High School
- Cagsiay III National High School
- Dr. Maria D. Pastrana National High School
- Liwayway National High School
- Manuel S. Enverga Memorial School of Arts and Trades
- Mother Perpetua Parochial School Incorporated

== List of cultural properties ==
Cultural Property wmph identifier (Note: wmph is an internal identifier used by Wikimedia Philippines to identify the monument. This is not an official identifier, and only shown temporarily in the templates until the government creates an updated complete list.)	Site name	Description	Province	City or municipality	Address	Coordinates	Image
	Spanish-Era Public Bath of Mauban	Built in 1725, the public bath was declared an Important Cultural Property by the National Museum of the Philippines	Quezon	Mauban, Quezon	San Buenaventura Street	14°11′33″N 121°43′56″E	Upload file
	RAS Copra Mill	The first copra mill in the town, owned and operated by the Sardea Family since the 1970s	Quezon	Mauban, Quezon		14°11′29″N 121°44′00″E	Upload file
	1925 Rizal Monument	Built on the town promontory called Calvario in 1925.	Quezon	Mauban, Quezon		14°11′21″N 121°43′51″E	Upload file
	NCR & Rienton Bus Terminal	Norma Cambal Rienton & Rienton Bus Lines, operating since the 1950s	Quezon	Mauban, Quezon		14°11′24″N 121°43′55″E	Upload file
	Virgilio Pansacola Ancestral House	Ancestral house of Virgilio Pansacola, built in 1915.	Quezon	Mauban, Quezon		14°11′23″N 121°43′50″E	Upload file
	Taino Ancestral House	Ancestral house of the Taino Clan	Quezon	Mauban, Quezon		14°11′23″N 121°43′50″E	Upload file
	Padre Horacio de la Costa Ancestral House	Ancestral house of Horacio de la Costa, S.J., first Filipino Provincial Superior of the Jesuits	Quezon	Mauban, Quezon		14°11′23″N 121°43′50″E	Upload file
	Talabong-Pansacola Ancestral House	Ancestral house of the Talabong-Pansacola Family	Quezon	Mauban, Quezon		14°11′23″N 121°43′49″E	Upload file
	Almires-Clemente Ancestral House	Ancestral house of the Almires-Clemente Family, and residence of Regional Trial Court Judge Ramón Clemente. Completed on 15 December 1915.	Quezon	Mauban, Quezon		14°11′23″N 121°43′49″E	Upload file
	Alquiros-Pastrana Ancestral House	Ancestral house of the Alquiros-Pastrana Family	Quezon	Mauban, Quezon		14°11′24″N 121°43′50″E	Upload file
	Quintana-Pastrana Ancestral House	Ancestral house of the Quintana-Pastrana Family	Quezon	Mauban, Quezon		14°11′24″N 121°43′51″E	Upload file
	Garcia-Pastrana Ancestral House	Ancestral house of the García-Pastrana Family	Quezon	Mauban, Quezon		14°11′25″N 121°43′51″E	Upload Photo
	Llamas-Naranjilla Ancestral House	Ancestral house of the Llamas-Naranjilla Family	Quezon	Mauban, Quezon		14°11′21″N 121°43′49″E	Upload file
	Dejumas-Pastrana Ancestral House	Ancestral house of the Dejumas-Pastrana family. Formerly the Administration Building of Filipinas College	Quezon	Mauban, Quezon		14°11′21″N 121°43′49″E	Upload file
	Mauban Old Catholic Cemetery	Former municipal graveyard for Roman Catholics	Quezon	Mauban, Quezon		14°11′32″N 121°43′43″E	Upload file
	Central Quezon Academy	Rosario Building of Central Quezon Academy, established in 1929.	Quezon	Mauban, Quezon		14°11′29″N 121°43′50″E	Upload file
	Encomienda Ancestral House	Ancestral house of the Encomienda Clan	Quezon	Mauban, Quezon		14°11′29″N 121°43′49″E	Upload file
	Pelejo Ancestral House	Ancestral house of the Pelejo Clan	Quezon	Mauban, Quezon	Rizal corner Clemente streets	14°11′27″N 121°43′49″E	Upload file
	Gloria Pastrana Ancestral House	Ancestral house of Gloria Pastrana	Quezon	Mauban, Quezon	Rizal Street	14°11′26″N 121°43′55″E	Upload file
	Pomarada Ancestral House	Ancestral house of the Pomarada Clan	Quezon	Mauban, Quezon	Rizal Street	14°11′26″N 121°43′55″E	Upload file
	Bantayan Ancestral House	Ancestral house of the Bantayan Clan	Quezon	Mauban, Quezon	Evangelista corner Gómez streets	14°11′28″N 121°43′52″E	Upload file
	Eleazar-Ysrael Ancestral House	Ancestral house of the Eleazar-Ysrael Family, completed in 1928.	Quezon	Mauban, Quezon	Gómez Street	14°11′28″N 121°43′51″E	Upload file
	Pomarada Ancestral House (Jacinto corner Gómez streets)	Ancestral house of the Pomarada Clan	Quezon	Mauban, Quezon	Jacinto corner Gómez streets	14°11′29″N 121°43′50″E	Upload file
	Balquiedra Ancestral House	Ancestral house of the Balquiedra lan	Quezon	Mauban, Quezon	Gómez corner Jacinto streets	14°11′29″N 121°43′50″E	Upload file
	Inaanuran Ancestral House	Ancestral house of the Inaanuran Clan	Quezon	Mauban, Quezon	Jacinto Street	14°11′28″N 121°43′49″E	Upload file
	Pastores Ancestral House	Ancestral house of the Pastores Clan, built in 1915.	Quezon	Mauban, Quezon	Gómez Street	14°11′28″N 121°43′51″E	Upload file
	Balamban Ancestral House	Ancestral house of the Balamban Clan	Quezon	Mauban, Quezon	Aguinaldo corner Plaridel streets	14°11′27″N 121°43′47″E	Upload file
	Fortunado Ancestral House	Ancestral house of the Fortunado Clan	Quezon	Mauban, Quezon	Aguinaldo Street	14°11′27″N 121°43′47″E	Upload file
	Domingo Moreno Ancestral House	Ancestral house of Domingo Moreno	Quezon	Mauban, Quezon	R. Pansacola corner Aguinaldo streets	14°11′26″N 121°43′46″E	Upload file
	Camposagrado Ancestral House	Ancestral house of the Camposagrado Clan	Quezon	Mauban, Quezon	R. Pansacola corner Bonifacio streets	14°11′27″N 121°43′46″E	Upload file
	Del Banco Ancestral House	Del Banco Ancestral House, dated 23 Nov 1911 on its cement steps.	Quezon	Mauban, Quezon	San Buenaventura Street	14°11′26″N 121°43′54″E	Upload file
	Ysrael Ancestral House	Ancestral house of the Ysrael Clan	Quezon	Mauban, Quezon	San Buenaventura Street	14°11′26″N 121°43′54″E	Upload file
	Sardea Ancestral House	Ancestral house of the Sardea Clan	Quezon	Mauban, Quezon	San Buenaventura Street	14°11′26″N 121°43′54″E	Upload file
	Calvario Ancestral House	Ancestral house of the Calvario Clan	Quezon	Mauban, Quezon	Jocson corner Evangelista streets	14°11′32″N 121°43′53″E	Upload file
	Felipe Escudero, Sr. Ancestral House	Ancestral house of Felipe Escudero, Sr.	Quezon	Mauban, Quezon	Jocson corner General Flores streets	14°11′32″N 121°43′52″E	Upload file
	Villamayor Ancestral House	Ancestral house of the Villamayor Clan	Quezon	Mauban, Quezon	Aguinaldo Street	14°11′32″N 121°43′50″E	Upload file
	Pasamba Ancestral House	Ancestral house of the Pasamba Clan	Quezon	Mauban, Quezon	Bonifacio corner Clemente streets	14°11′31″N 121°43′48″E	Upload file
	Times Theatre of Mauban	Owned by José Rozaldo, operating since the 1950s	Quezon	Mauban, Quezon		14°11′25″N 121°43′57″E	Upload file
	Mauban Sea Wall	Built in 1935, this structure was declared a Significant Cultural Property by the National Museum of the Philippines.	Quezon	Mauban, Quezon		14°11′22″N 121°43′59″E	Upload file
	Times Kitchenette and Lodging House	Times Kitchenette and Lodging House, owned by Anita Remolona-Rozaldo	Quezon	Mauban, Quezon		14°11′25″N 121°43′57″E	Upload file
	Saint Bonaventure Parish Church of Mauban	Parish church of Mauban, dedicated to Saint Bonaventure	Quezon	Mauban, Quezon		14°11′25″N 121°43′51″E	Upload file

== Notable personalities ==
- Manuel S. Enverga - Filipino representative for Quezon's 1st congressional district, 1953 - 1969
- Mark Enverga - Filipino representative for Quezon's 1st congressional district, 2007 - 2016, and since 2019
- Buenaventura Villamayor - Filipino chess player
- Rene Saguisag - Filipino senator from 1987 to 1992
- Horacio de la Costa - Filipino Jesuit priest, historian, first Filipino Provincial Superior of the Society of Jesus in the Philippines, and first Filipino Dean of the College of Arts and Sciences at Ateneo de Manila
- Eli Remolona - Governor, Bangko Sentral ng Pilipinas
- Jose Mari Gonzales - Actor and former Member of the House of Representatives of the Philippines
- JM Ibarra - actor
