= Alberto Segismundo Cruz =

Filipino poet, short story writer and novelist

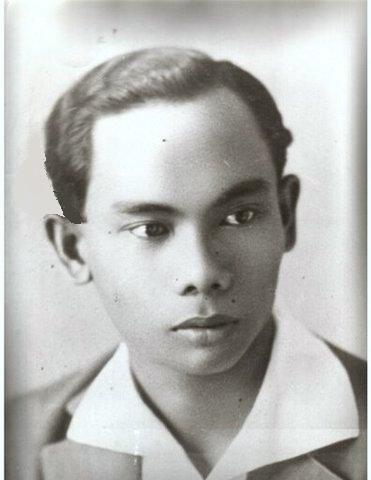
- Born: November 21, 1901; Tondo, Manila, Philippine Islands
- Died: October 8, 1989 (aged 87)
- Occupations: Author, poet, short story writer, novelist
- Spouse: Patrocinio Lopez Cruz
- Children: 10

Alberto Segismundo Cruz (21 November 1901 – 8 October 1989) was a Filipino poet, short story writer and novelist. Three of his novels have been published by Ateneo de Manila Press.

Soledad S. Reyes wrote: "The interconnectedness between the past and the present was a theme familiar to many Filipino writers who, in a variety of ways, argued the need to remember the past. Francisco Laksamana, Faustino Aguilar, Lazaro Francisco, Alberto Segismundo Cruz, Macario Pineda, and even Fausto Galauran, among others, constructed narratives enjoining the readers not to be dazzled by the present, but to remember the heroic and noble past of their forefathers."

== Birthplace ==
He was born on November 21, 1901, in Tondo, Manila, Philippines to Bartolome Cruz of Kaingin, Barasoain, Malolos, Bulacan and Eriberta Segismundo of Tondo, Manila. His father was the manager of a hat establishment in Binondo, Manila. He was married to Patrocinio Lopez Cruz of Tondo and Naic, Cavite, a hometown beauty queen when they met. He wrote for Bulaklak, Liwayway, Silahis, Kislap, Tagumpay - the country's leading weekly magazines during his time. He was poet laureate of the Republic of the Philippines in 1945 and won the Commonwealth literary awards in the 1940s and the Rizal Centennial Literary Awards in 1961. His contemporaries were Amado V. Hernandez, Fausto Galauran, Simeon Mercado, Nemesio Caravana and Liwayway Arceo, among others.

== Education ==
He began his early education at a kindergarten school ran by Maestra Enchang on Folgueras St., Tondo and Colegio La Juventud ran by Prof. Perfecto del Rosario. He also went to the Tondo Primary School and the Meisic Elementary School.

He finished high school at the Manila North High School, now Arellano High School, in Santa Cruz, Manila. He was in the same class (1922) as Lorenzo Sumulong, a Philippine senator. He went to the University of the Philippines and National University, where he obtained his A.A. degree. He finished his law studies at the Philippine Law School and became a member of the Philippine Bar in 1939.

As a student he was given these various honors: Sobresaliente, Lectura Castella, Colegio La Juventud Honor Student, Tondo Primary School Model Student, Meisic Primary School Distinguished Student and Declaimer, Tondo Intermediate School Class Poet, Manila North High School Orator, Philippine Law School (PLS) Senator, PLS Junior Philippine Senate Editor, The National, student organ of the National University

As a newsman and writer, he was a member of the pre-war TVT Publication (Taliba-La Vanguardia-Tribune). He covered Malacanang, the Senate and Congress. He contributed countless articles, features, short stories to the newspapers and magazines of his time. He was one of the few who was a prolific writer in both English and Filipino.

== Literary honors ==
- Holder of the Literary Award Record in short story and poetry in the pre-war Taliba and Liwayway
- Winner, Commonwealth Literary Contest (1940)
- Novelist of the Republic for his novel "Muling Pagsilang" (1942), adjudged by a juror headed by the illustrious senator and writer, Claro M. Recto
- Poet Laureate of the Republic (1947), with Simeon Mercado
- Winner, book-essay, Rizal National Centennial Commission (1961), with Leopoldo Yabes
- Winner, poetry, Rizal National Centennial Commission (1961)
- 1975 Palanca Awards - "Sino ang Bulag at Iba Pang Tula" by Alberto S. Cruz 1975 Palanca Awards

== Public and government service ==
As a lawyer, he was associated with Atty. M. V. Roxas and F. Soc Rodrigo.

He was a first grade civil service eligible and writer-translator, an attorney under Republic Act No. 1080, and attorney-claim investigator under the Judge Advocate General Office (1947).

He was in the Press Relations Division and also the Legal Division of the Office of the President of the Commonwealth from February 10, 1939 until December 31, 1941.

He was corrector of style and professor in Filipino and translation technique at the National Assembly (1942). He was Inspector General of the National Land Settlement Administration from March 24, 1948 to December 31, 1949.

From February 5, 1949 to December 31, 1950 he was an assistant at the Department of Foreign Affairs.

He was appointed Justice of the Peace for Indang-Inopacan, Leyte on August 16, 1951, but did not serve due to his commitments in the country's capital, Manila.

He was special attorney and legislative researcher at the Philippine Senate from March 1, 1951, until he retired from government service in 1961.

He is remembered, first, as a novelist, short story writer and poet. His works appeared in the prime entertainment sources of his time - the newspapers and weekly magazines, such as, Liwayway, Bulaklak, Silahis, Kislap Graphic and, then later, Tagumpay. His short story "Rosa Malaya" was featured in the high school textbook Diwang Ginto. He was included in the top 100 short story writers of his time in a book edited by Pedrito Reyes, "50 Kuwentong Ginto ng 50 Batikang Kuwentista". His novels "Ang Bungo", "Lakandula" and "Halimuyak" had been published as college textbook by Ateneo University.

As the first accredited vernacular newsman in Malacanang, he was the first newspaperman welcomed by President Manuel L. Quezon to write and translate his speeches, addresses and pronouncements into the National Language, making it possible to bring the message of the Chief Executive and make it better understood by the people. To-be-president Diosdado Macapagal was in the same press relations office in Malacanang, at that time.

As lawyer of the Tondo Foreshore Residents' Association, he was instrumental in the preparation of a bill that granted the right to thousands of poor bonafide occupants of the Tondo foreshore area to purchase the lots they had occupied since liberation on an installment plan basis. He argued for them in the hearings until the bill became Republic Act 559, benefiting thousands of families in the Tondo foreshore area.

Inspired by the late Claro M. Recto and José P. Laurel, he initiated together with Jose Villa Panganiban, who became Director of the Institute of National Language, the project to translate into Filipino all acts and resolutions of the Congress of the Philippines in order that the people may understand better their rights and obligations as citizens.

== Final years ==
Alberto immigrated to the United States in the mid-1960s to be with his children and grandchildren. His last work was Sariling Parnaso, a collection of poems. He had ten children, who all ended up living in the United States.

He came back to the Philippines and spent the rest of his years at the house he and wife, Patrocinio, built in Project 8, Quezon City.

He died in 1989 at the age of 87.

His friend and contemporary National Artist Amado V. Hernandez who also grew up in Tondo had the highest respect for Alberto. "Siya'y isa kong iginagalang na makata at manunulat."

"Sa ilang nobela ni Alberto Segismundo Cruz ay makikita ang pagsasanib ng tradisyonal na tema ng protesta at ilang elemento ng modernismo. Bagama't karaniwang ipinalalagay na kasabay nina Fausto Galauran at Narcisco Asistio, higit na makatwirang ibilang si Cruz sa henerasyon ng mga manunulat na naging kilala matapos ang digmaan.

"Sa kanyang mga nobela ay ipinahayag ni Cruz ang kanyang pagkabahala sa masasamang epekto ng pagpasok ng kaunlaran o sibilisasyon sa Pilipinas. Sa "Halimuyak" at "Lakandula", inilarawan ni Cruz ang isang bayang tahimik at matulain bago ito sinalanta ng sibilisasyon o kaunlaran. Ang ganitong tema ng pagkawasak ng likas na katahimikan at kagandahan ay inilangkap ni Cruz sa kuwento ng pag-ibig."

"Filipino poets and writers have been using the form of letters and their epistolaric qualities to render their literary works: the likes of Julian Cruz Balmaceda, Jose Corazon de Jesus, Lope K. Santos, Iñigo Ed Regado, Amado V. Hernandez, Emilio A. Bunag, Florentino T. Collantes, Ildefonso Santos, Alejandro G. Abadilla, Manuel Principe Bautista and Alberto Segismundo Cruz. (Añonuevo, 274)."
