= San Antonio, Quezon =

Municipality in Quezon, Philippines

San Antonio Buliran
- Municipality
- Municipality of San Antonio
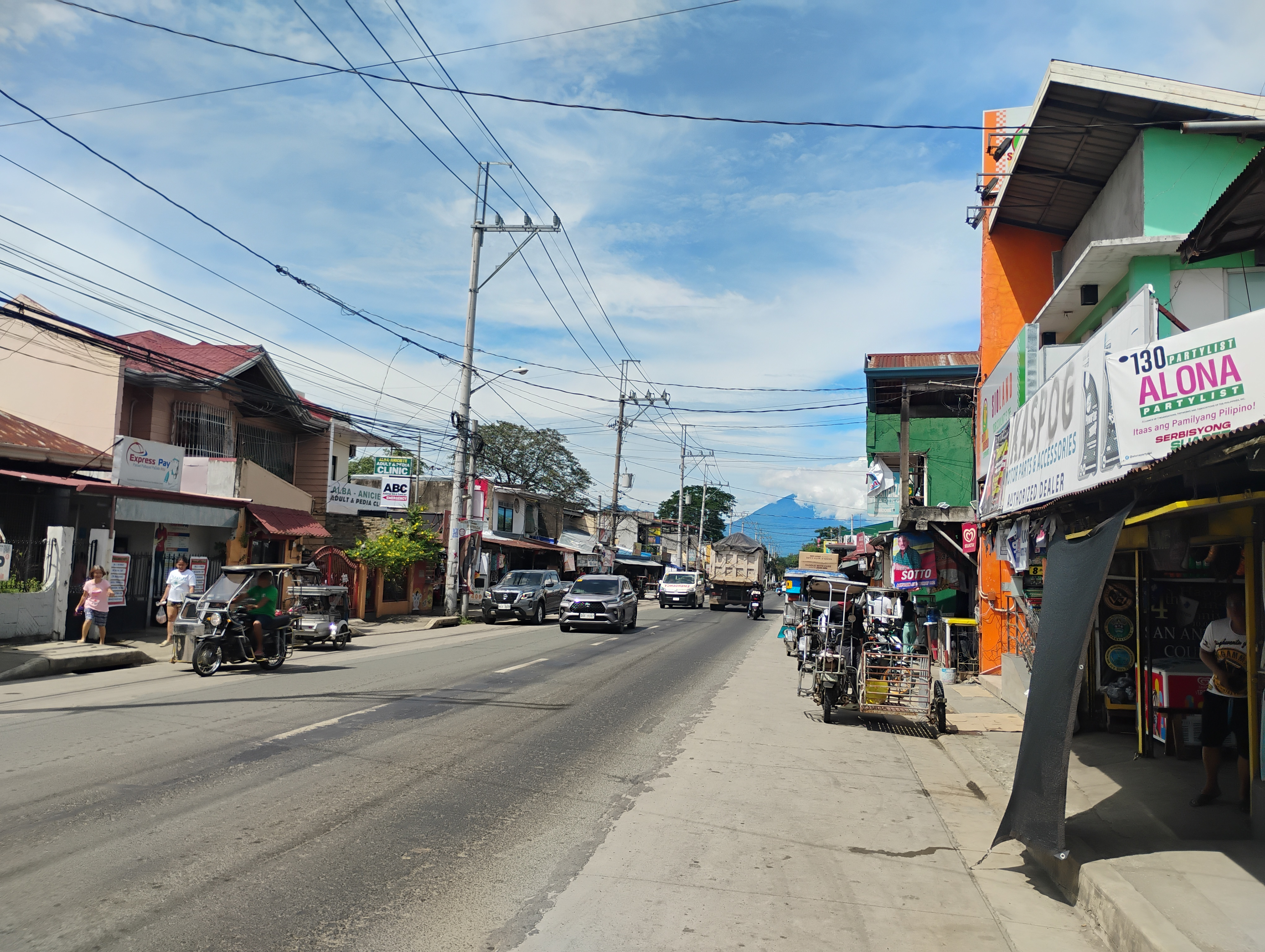
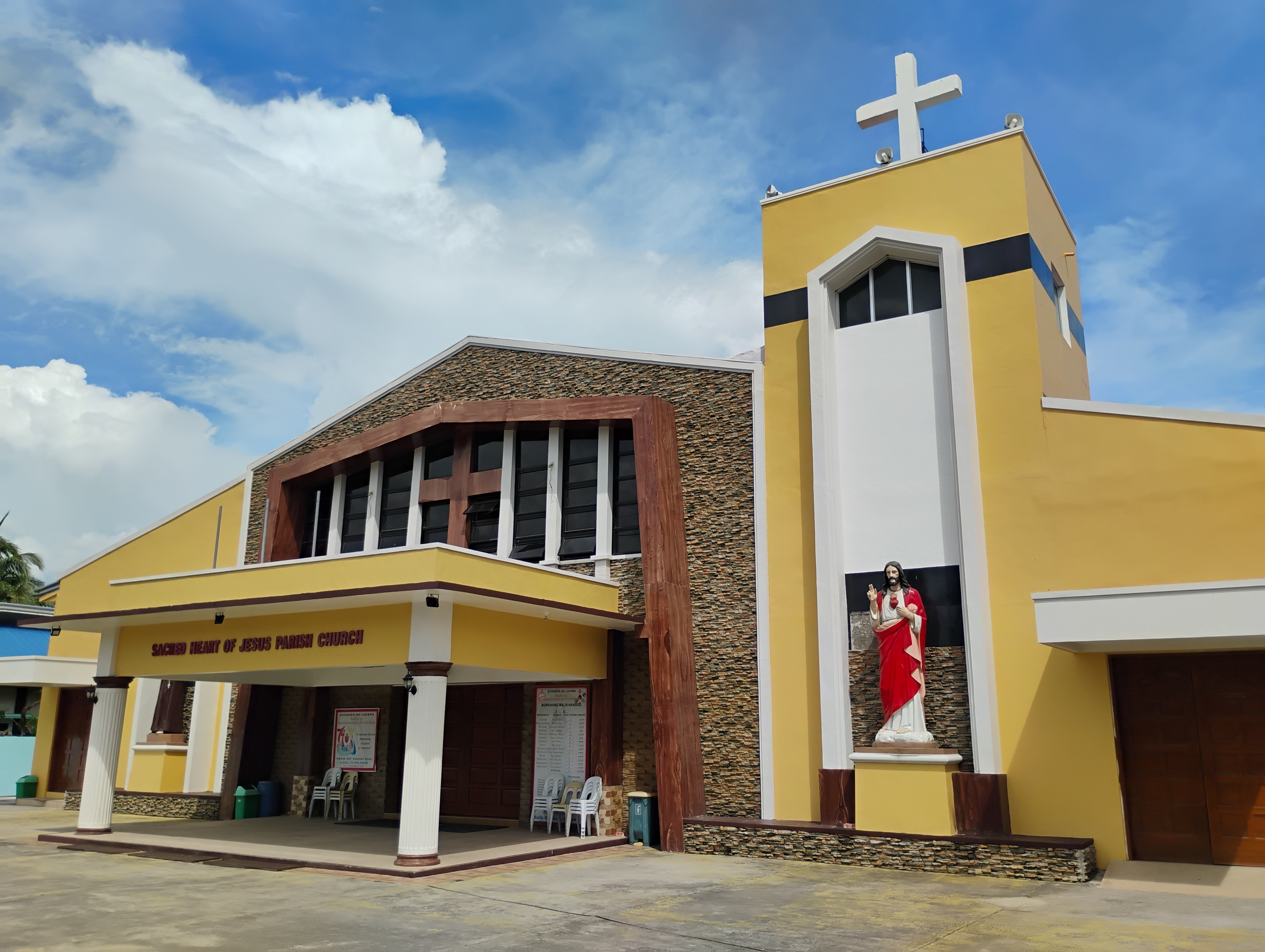
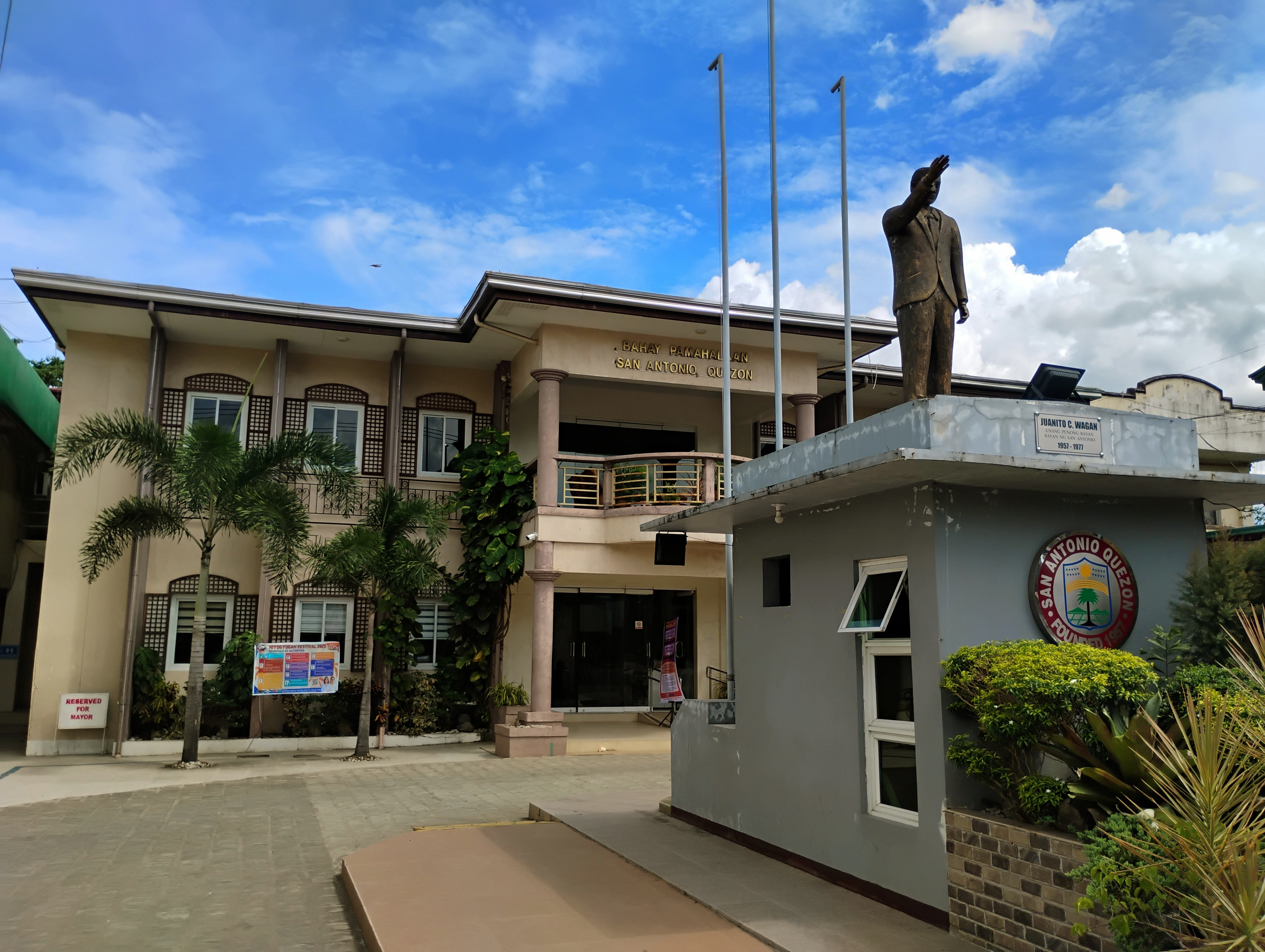
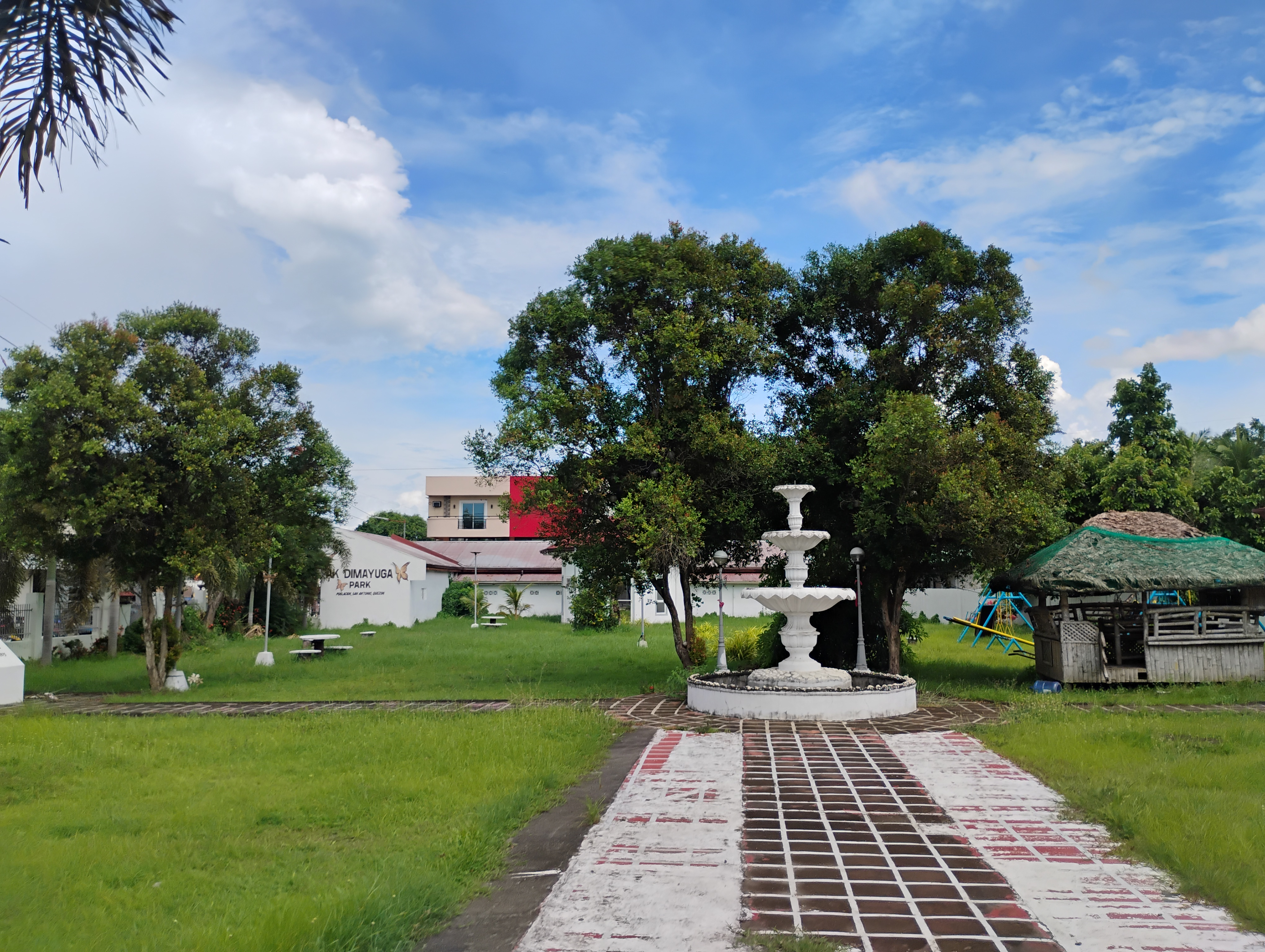
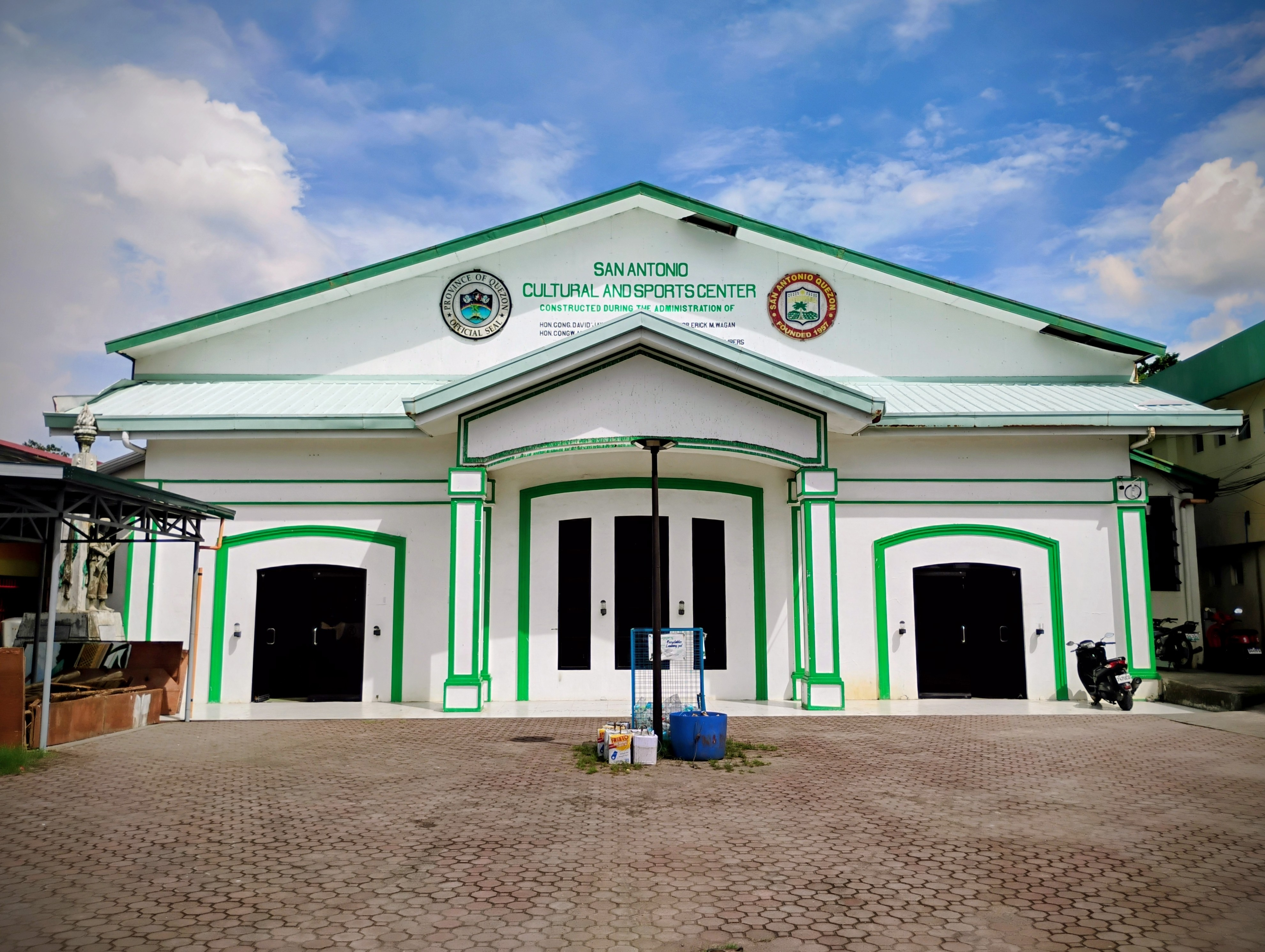
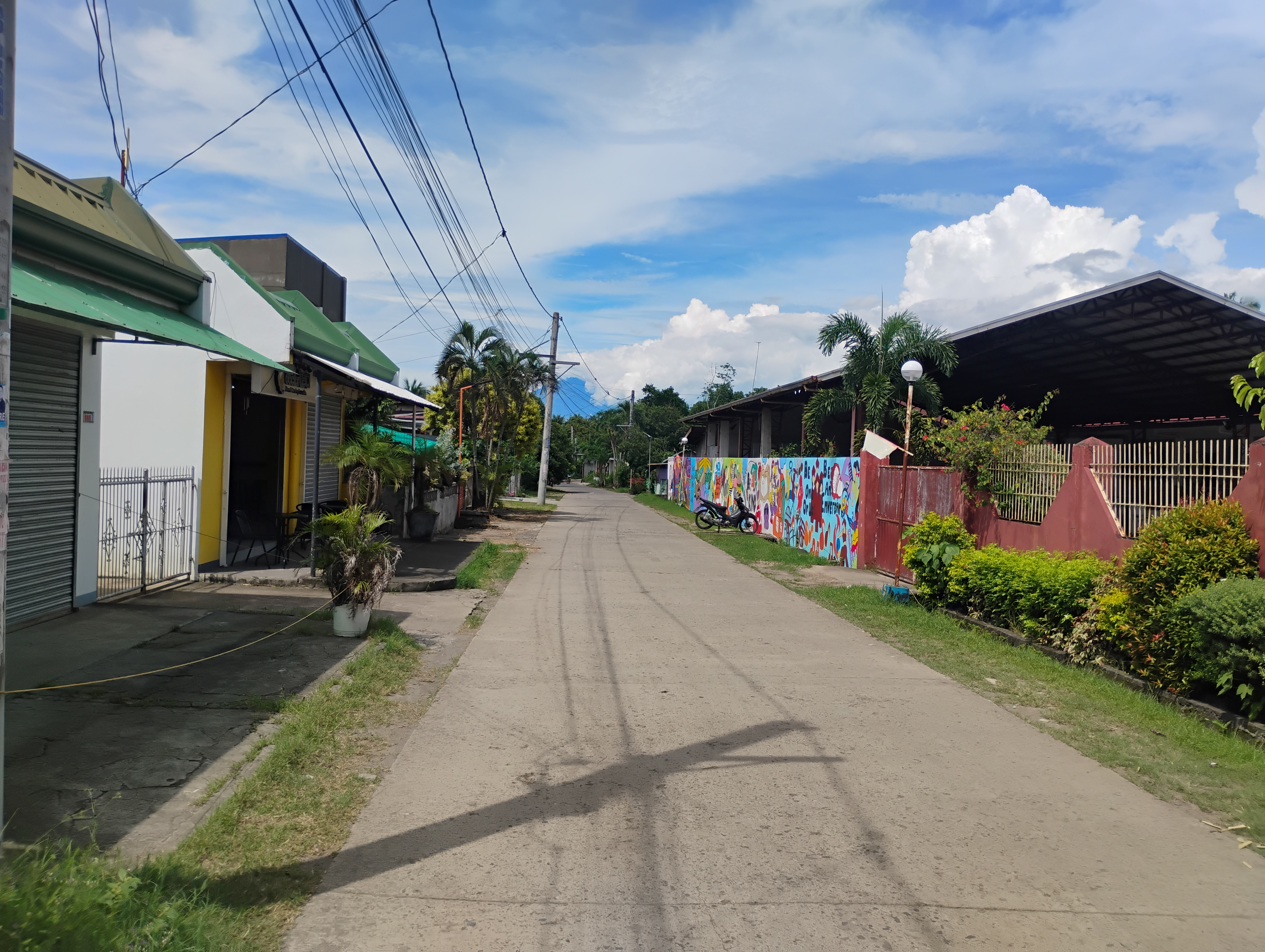
- From top, left to right: San Antonio Town Proper, Sacred Heart of Jesus Parish Church, Municipal Hall, Maria Amparo K. Dimayuga Park, San Antonio Cultural & Sports Center, H. Quizon Street

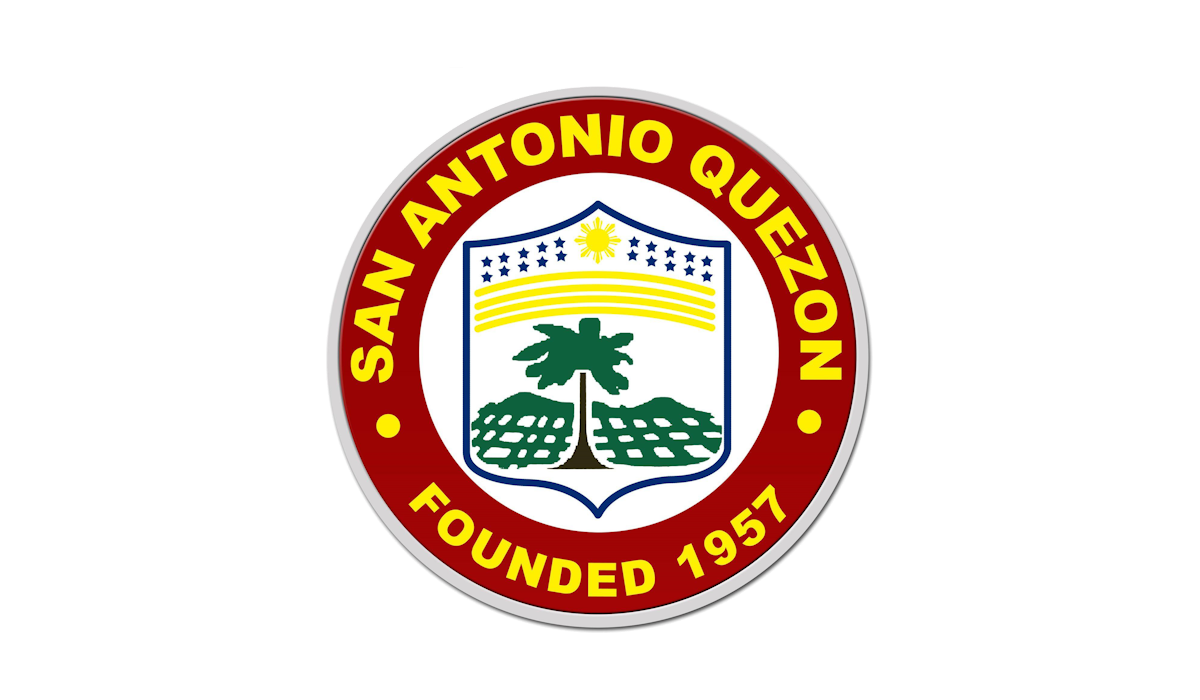
- Flag Seal

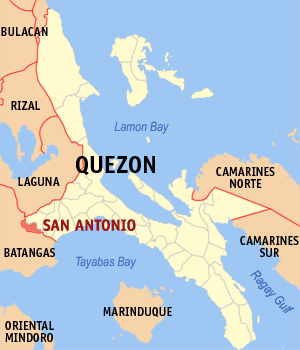
- Map of Quezon with San Antonio highlighted
- Interactive map of San Antonio
- Location within the Philippines
- Coordinates: 13°54′N 121°18′E
- Country: Philippines
- Region: Calabarzon
- Province: Quezon
- District: 2nd district
- Founded: October 4, 1957
- Named for: St. Anthony of Padua
- Barangays: 20 (see Barangays)

Government
  - Type: Sangguniang Bayan
  - Mayor: Erick M. Wagan
  - Vice Mayor: Alvin Cometa Pillerba
  - Representative: David C. Suarez
  - Municipal Council: Members: May Sales; Alvin Hiwatig; Randy Din; Ryan Vidal; Marvin Tapire; Eddie Estallo Jr.; Carmelo Cuevas
  - Electorate: 26,335 voters (2025)

Area
  - Total: 172.93 km^{2} (66.77 sq mi)
- Elevation: 134 m (440 ft)
- Highest elevation: 985 m (3,232 ft)
- Lowest elevation: 16 m (52 ft)

Population (2024 census)
  - Total: 36,451
  - Density: 210.78/km^{2} (545.93/sq mi)
  - Households: 8,251
- Demonym: San Antoniohin

Economy
  - Income class: 3rd municipal income class
  - Poverty incidence: 6.15% (2023)
  - Revenue: ₱ 174.6 million (2024)
  - Assets: ₱ 508 million (2024)
  - Expenditure: ₱ 70.86 million (2024)
  - Liabilities: ₱ 42.92 million (2024)

Service provider
  - Electricity: Manila Electric Company (Meralco)
- Time zone: UTC+8 (PST)
- ZIP code: 4324
- PSGC: 0405641000
- IDD : area code: +63 (0)42
- Native languages: Tagalog
- Website: https://www.sanantonioquezon.net

San Antonio, officially the Municipality of San Antonio (Tagalog: Bayan ng San Antonio), is a municipality in the province of Quezon, Philippines. According to the 2024 census, it has a population of 36,451 people.

== History ==
Buliran, a barangay of the present-day municipality of San Antonio, is a progressive one at its western part. Its history is still unknown to many people, which were told by two aged persons by the name of Hermogina Quizon and Venancio Ilagan. According to them this barrio was named Bulihan. When they inhabited the place, they found the place a big area and crowded with tall cogon, talahib and amorsiko grasses, wild vines and giant-like trees along the river. The first people to inhabit the place were from the western part of the place or Batangueño who witnessed the wild animals loitering around. They were also the inhabitants who cultivated the land in spite of the fear they feel when this barrio was inhabited by the outlaws headed by Kolas Igat.

This place which was the hideout of the outlaws was named "Impierno," which literally translates to hell, based on the killings of the prisoners of Kolas lgat. Kolas Igat and his men frequented the municipalities of San Pablo, Tiaong, Candelaria, San Juan, Padre Garcia and those who did not obey his orders were made prisoners and sentenced to death at "Impierno". Because of the many lives seized by the outlaw leader, the place was called "Buliran".

Then under the administration of Kapitan Pedro Veneracion during the Spanish Regime, he distributed the land to the people. To allure the Batangueños, a road leading to Padre Garcia and Tiaong was opened. Every person who received a piece of land was asked to pay a tax of one peso or to donate free labor for one week in the construction of the road. As expected, the population grew fast and the people established residence along the road. Simeon de Torres, a barrio ruler, was among the inhabitants who have done a lot towards the attainment of peace and prosperity of the place.

Time passed until 1938 when the barrio market was established after Valentin Umali lent the market site. A bridge was constructed between Niing and Buliran. A school building was constructed along with the first Catholic Chapel. In 1946, General Andres "Dumas" Umali thought of making Buliran a municipality separate from Tiaong. There were many hindrances as a result of the World War II. Time goes by and the barrio progressed. The barrio lieutenants then of Niing, Buliran, Pury, Behia, Callejon and Matipunso held a meeting and resolved to bring the matter to the Municipal Council of Tiaong through Councilor Juanito C. Wagan.

The municipal council did not approve, however, the resolution. Wagan then thought of approaching the congressman of the first district of Quezon, Manuel S. Enverga. He was advised to prepare a petition and brought it to the attention of the provincial board. The parish priest Calixto Jamilla, who was among the petitioner, choose the name San Antonio after St. Anthony of Padua because of the miracles he had shown.

At Lucena, objections were raised. A public hearing was set at the Municipal Hall of Tiaong. The matter was fully deliberated upon, and the reasons for its creation were found satisfactory. The petition then was elevated to the Executive Secretary.

Years passed, President Carlos P. Garcia signed Executive Order No. 270 on October 4, 1957, creating the new municipality of San Antonio by segregating the barrios of Buliran, Callejon, Niing, and Pury from the municipality of Tiaong. On November 19, 1957, a municipal mayor, a vice mayor and six councilmen were appointed and took their oaths of office on November 22. The first municipal council session was held on November 25.

Republic Act No. 3361 (An Act Making the Barrio of Matipunso of the Municipality of Tiaong, Province of Quezon, a Part of the Municipality of San Antonio, Same Province), approved on June 18, 1961, was enacted to transfer the jurisdiction of Barrio Matipunso from the Municipality of Tiaong to the Municipality of San Antonio, both within the Province of Quezon. This legislative act facilitated the administrative realignment of Barangay Matipunso, ensuring it became part of San Antonio.

== Geography ==
=== Barangays ===
San Antonio is politically subdivided into 20 barangays, as indicated below. Each barangay consists of puroks and some have sitios.

- Arawan
- Bagong Niing
- Balat Atis
- Briones
- Bulihan
- Buliran
- Callejon
- Corazon
- Loob
- Manuel del Valle, Sr.
- Magsaysay
- Matipunso
- Niing
- Poblacion
- Pulo
- Pury
- Sampaga
- Sampaguita
- San Jose
- Sinturisan

=== Climate ===
Climate data for San Antonio, Quezon
Month	Jan	Feb	Mar	Apr	May	Jun	Jul	Aug	Sep	Oct	Nov	Dec	Year
Mean daily maximum °C (°F)	27 (81)	28 (82)	29 (84)	31 (88)	31 (88)	30 (86)	29 (84)	29 (84)	29 (84)	28 (82)	28 (82)	27 (81)	29 (84)
Mean daily minimum °C (°F)	20 (68)	20 (68)	21 (70)	22 (72)	24 (75)	24 (75)	24 (75)	24 (75)	23 (73)	23 (73)	22 (72)	21 (70)	22 (72)
Average precipitation mm (inches)	52 (2.0)	35 (1.4)	27 (1.1)	27 (1.1)	82 (3.2)	124 (4.9)	163 (6.4)	144 (5.7)	145 (5.7)	141 (5.6)	100 (3.9)	102 (4.0)	1,142 (45)
Average rainy days	12.0	8.1	8.8	9.7	17.9	22.6	26.2	24.5	24.6	22.0	16.7	14.9	208
Source: Meteoblue

== Demographics ==
Population census of San Antonio
Year	Pop.	±% p.a.
1960	9,847	—
1970	14,236	+3.75%
1975	16,204	+2.63%
1980	17,701	+1.78%
1990	20,786	+1.62%
1995	22,933	+1.86%
2000	26,419	+3.08%
2007	30,023	+1.78%
2010	31,681	+1.98%
2015	33,467	+1.05%
2020	35,891	+1.48%
2024	36,451	+0.37%
Source: Philippine Statistics Authority

Total Population by Province, City, Municipality, and Barangay: as of May 1, 2020.

Province, Municipality Barangay	Total Population
QUEZON *	1,950,459
SAN ANTONIO	35,891
Arawan	1,606
Bagong Niing	1,861
Balat Atis	1,093
Briones	1,852
Bulihan	2,069
Buliran	1,847
Callejon	2,054
Corazon	1,172
Manuel del Valle, Sr.	1,049
Labas	2,077
Magsaysay	932
Matipunso	2,121
Niing	1,439
Poblacion	2,248
Pulo	2,618
Pury	2,138
Sampaga	1,629
Sampaguita	2,216
San Jose	1,996
Sinturisan	1,874

== Economy ==
Poverty incidence of San Antonio (%)

Source: Philippine Statistics Authority

== Education ==
The San Antonio Schools District Office governs all educational institutions within the municipality. It oversees the management and operations of all private and public, from primary to secondary schools.

=== Primary and elementary schools ===
- Anne Benedictine Montessori
- Arawan Elementary School
- Briones Elementary School
- Bixby Knolls Preparatory Academy
- Bulihan Elementary School
- Callejon Elementary School
- Del Valle Elementary School
- Domingo M. Isabedra Memorial Elementary School
- Magsaysay Elementary School
- Matipunso Elementary School
- Niing Elementary School
- Pury Elementary School
- Saint Anne Montessori Learning Center
- Saint Vincent Liem de la Paz Preparatory School
- Sampaga Elementary School
- San Antonio Central School
- Sintorisan Elementary School
- San Antonio Infotech School

=== Secondary schools ===
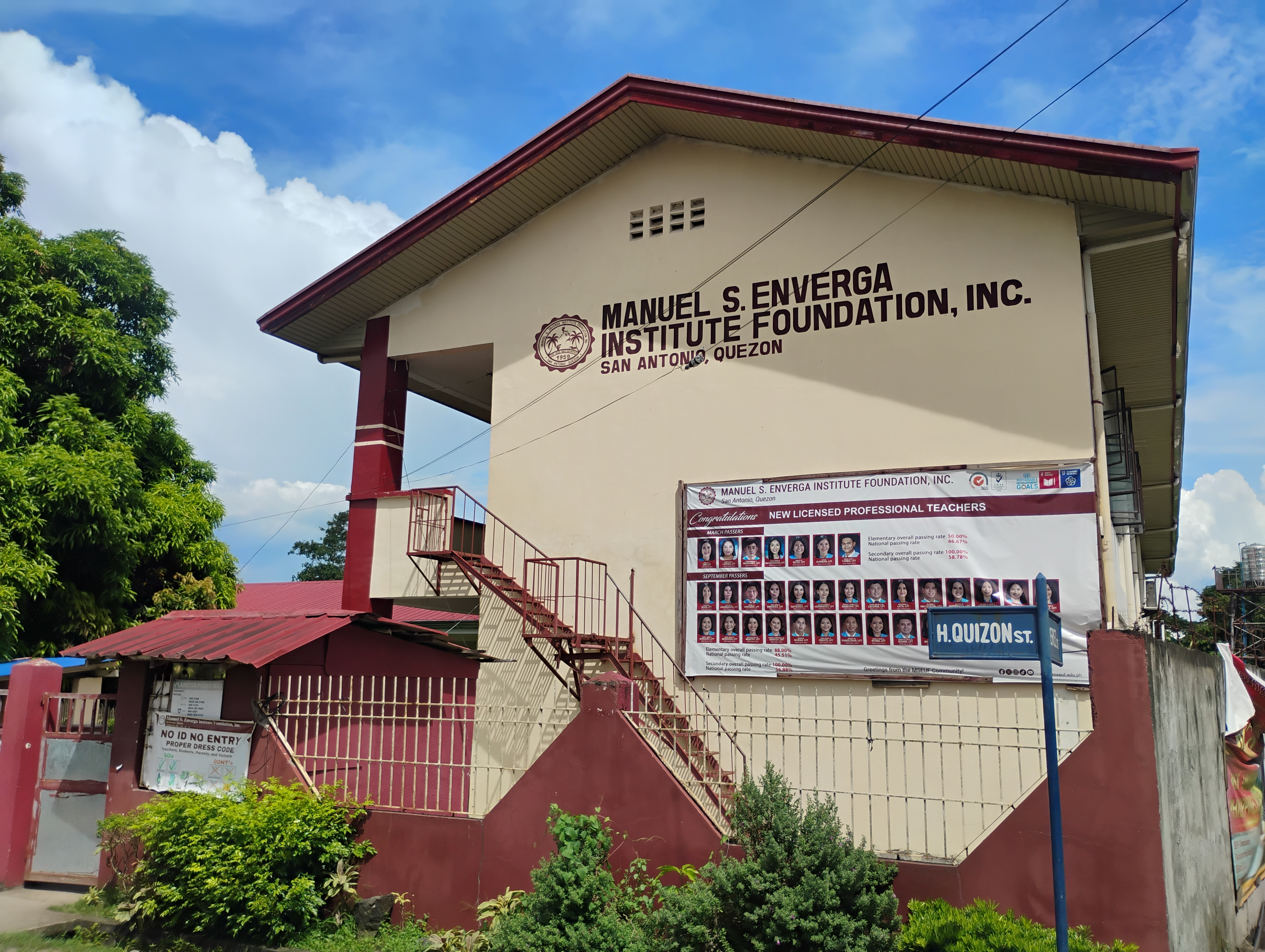
Manuel S. Enverga University Foundation San Antonio

- Bixby Knolls Preparatory Academy
- Callejon National High School
- ICT-ED Institute of Science and Technology
- Manuel S. Enverga University Foundation
- San Antonio National High Schoo
- Juanito C. Wagan Integrated National High School

=== Higher educational institutions ===
- ICT-ED Institute of Science and Technology
- Manuel S. Enverga University Foundation

== Government ==
=== Local government ===
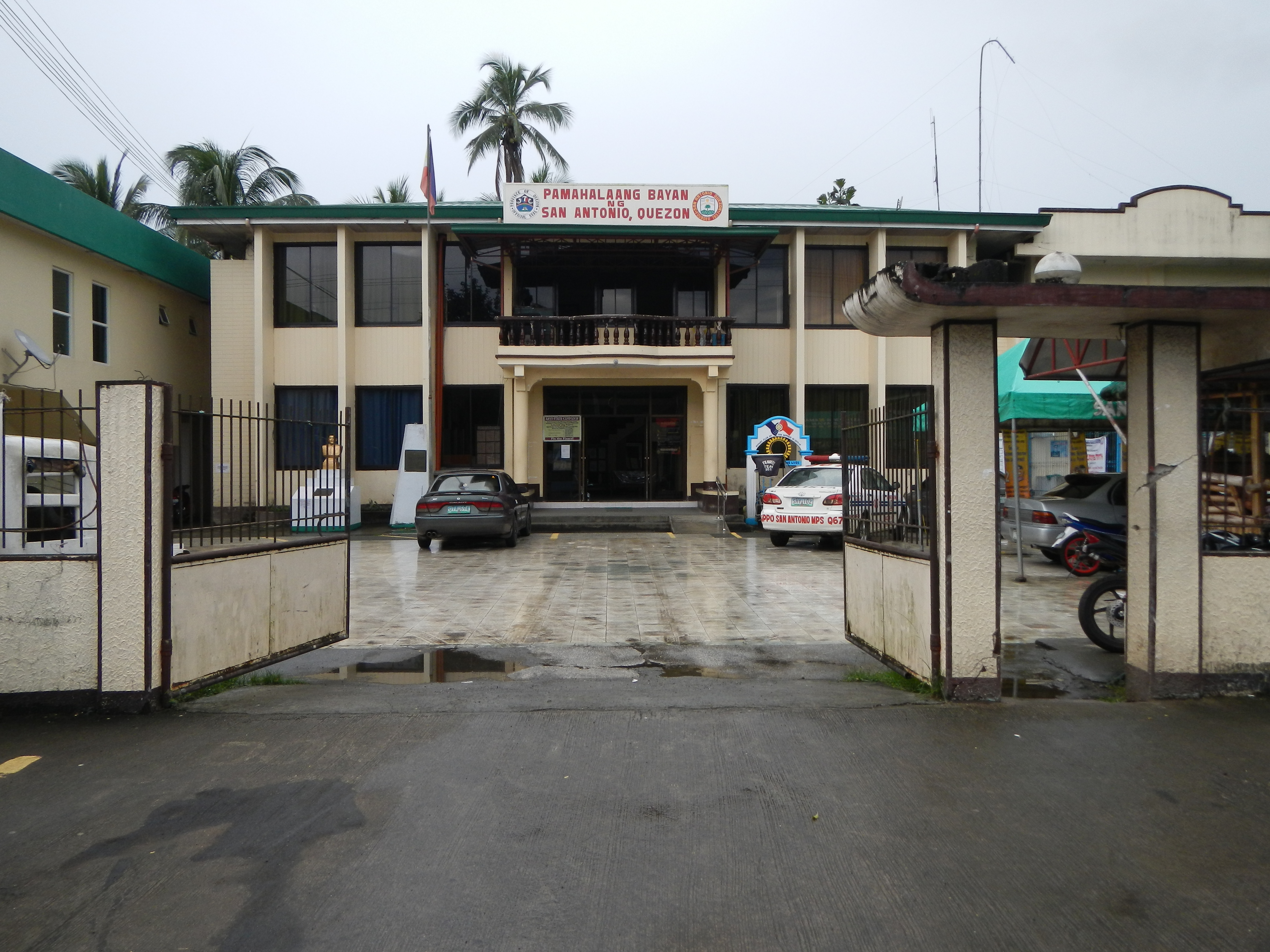
San Antonio Municipal Hall

Elected Officials of San Antonio (2022–present)
Position	Name	Party
Mayor	Aniano Ariel Wagan Jr.	Nacionalista
Vice Mayor	Jennifer Murphy	NPC
Councilors
Councilors	Mario Guce	Nacionalista
Councilors	Eddie Stallo Jr.	NPC
Councilors	Ryan Vidal	Nacionalista
Councilors	Manolito Pentinio	Nacionalista
Councilors	Petronilo Tapire	Nacionalista
Councilors	HedilitaMasongsong	Nacionalista
Councilors	Edna Perez	Nacionalista
Councilors	Cesar Dimaano	Nacionalista

== Notable personalities ==
- Gary Estrada, actor, former Quezon 2nd district Board Member, and nephew of former President Joseph Estrada
- Kiko Estrada, actor
- Proceso Alcala, former representative of Quezon 2nd District and former Agriculture Secretary
- Rob Gomez, actor and model
