= Philippine Law School =

Private law school in Pasay, Philippines

- Paaralan ng Batas ng Pilipinas
- Latin: Schola Iuris Philippinarum
- Former names: National University
- Motto: "Lex et Iustitia"
- Motto in English: "Law and Justice"
- Type: Private, nonsectarian, law school
- Established: 1915
- Founders: Simeon Conlu Lacson, Ricardo Conlu Lacson, Mariano F. Jhocson, Sr.
- Chairman: Sabina Lacson
- President: Vittorio Lacson
- Academic staff: 75
- Students: 1,200
- Undergraduates: N/A
- Postgraduates: 1,200
- Location: 1942 Donada Street corner San Juan, Pasay, Metro Manila, Philippines; 14°33′21″N 120°59′46″E
- Campus: 2 hectares (4.9 acres); Urban
- Bar passage rate: 85% (2023)
- Colors: Blue and gold
- Nickname: PLS Law Warriors
- Mascot: Scales of Justice
- Website: phillaw.edu.ph

The Philippine Law School (PLS), founded in 1915, is a law school in the Philippines. It formerly served as the college of law of National University in Manila.

It has produced lawyers such as Philippine President Carlos P. Garcia, a member of the class of 1923 who placed 8th in the Bar Examinations with a rating of 86.60%. President Diosdado Macapagal was also a PLS law student until his sophomore year, later transferring to the University of Santo Tomas. The school also produced Senate President Neptali A. Gonzales, and Atty. Anacleto R. Mangaser, who holds the third highest official general average in the history of the Bar Examinations (95.85%).

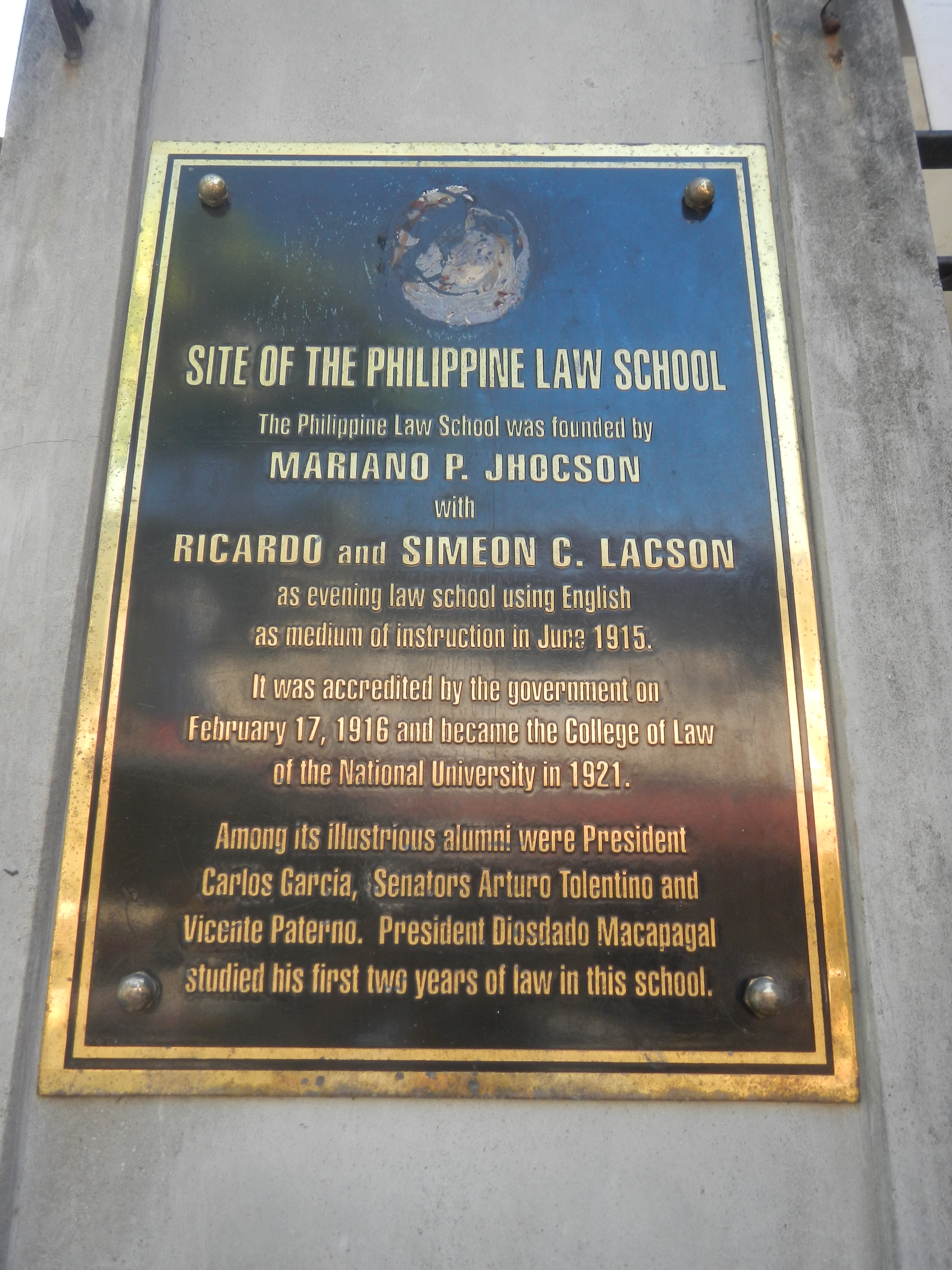
Historical marker of Site of the Philippine Law School, Intramuros

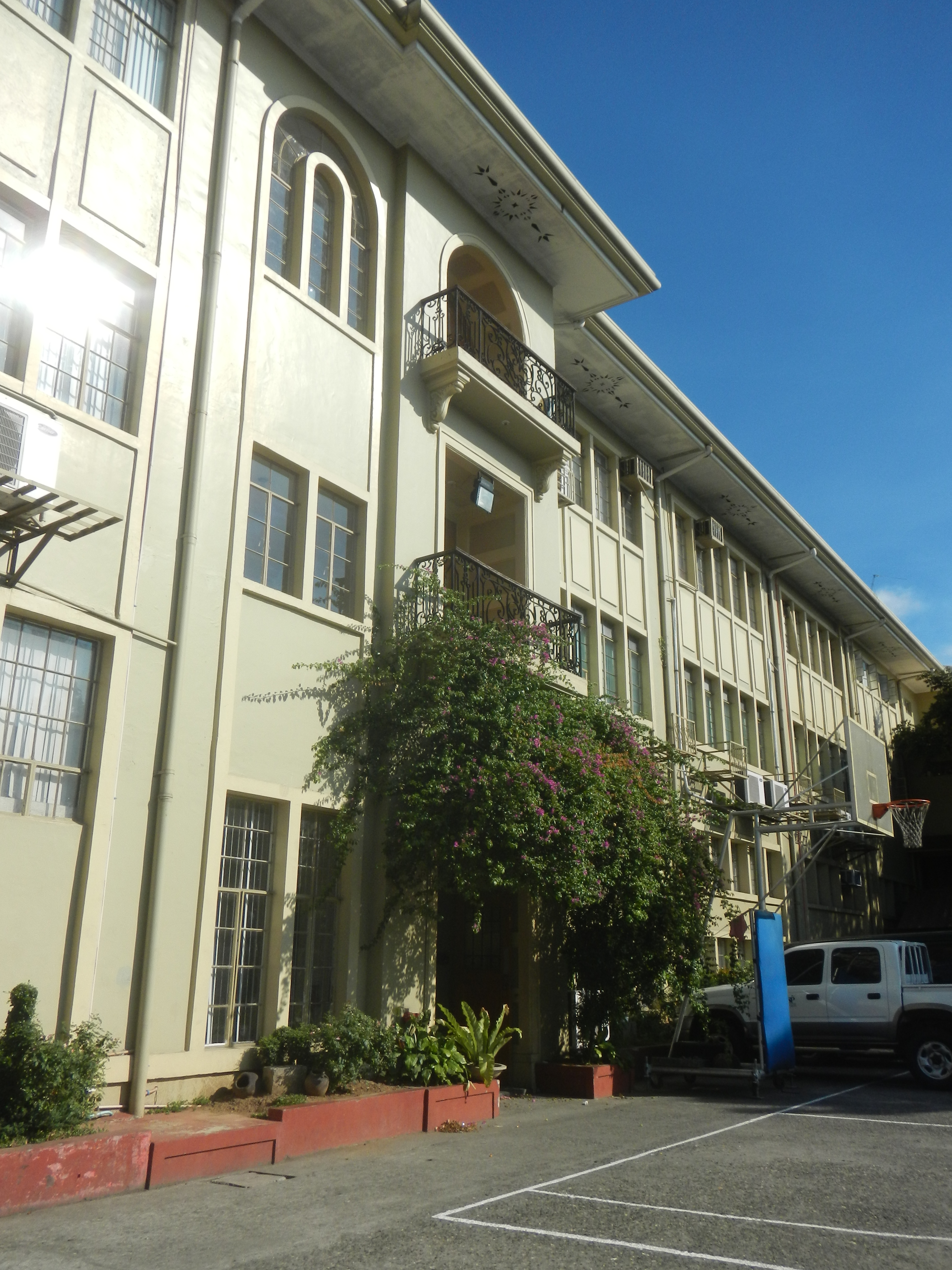
Site of the Philippine Law School, Intramuros

== History ==
Founded in 1915 by Attorneys Simeon Conlu Lacson and Ricardo Conlu Lacson (National University Second President from 1934-1937) in collaboration with Mariano F. Jhocson Sr., the founder of the National University (Philippines), Philippine Law School was established at its first campus in Quiapo, Manila. It previously served as the College of Law of National University (Philippines) in Sampaloc, Manila.

Atty. Simeon Rene T. Lacson took over as president and oversaw the school's transfer from Intramuros to Pasay in 1958. He served the school until his death in 2009.

Today, Philippine Law School's Board of Trustees is headed by Mr. Vittorio G. Lacson (chair), with Ms. Sabina G. Lacson (president/COO) in charge of operations, and Atty. Jose Grapilon as dean.

== Notable alumni ==
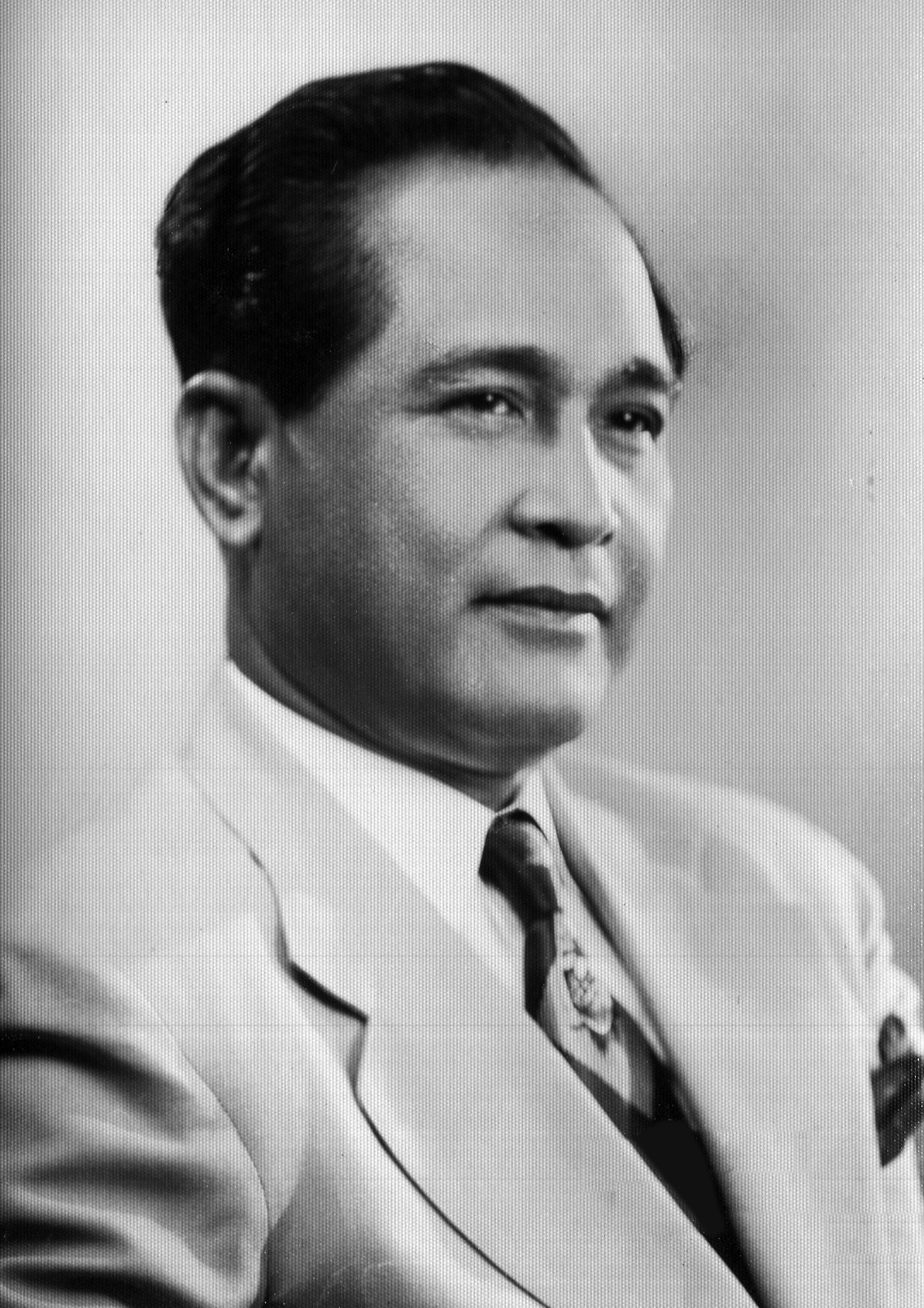
Carlos P. Garcia, 8th President of the Philippines

- Carlos P. Garcia - 8th President of the Philippines, lawyer, teacher and poet. Bachelor of Laws (Philippine Law School), Doctor of Humanities (honoris causa) National University (1961).
- Diosdado Macapagal - 9th President of the Philippines, 6th Vice President of the Philippines, lawyer and professor. Bachelor of Laws (attended).
- Neptali Gonzales - President of the Senate of the Philippines from 1992 to 1993, 1995 to 1996, and 1998, lawyer. Top 9 in 1949 Philippine Bar Examination.
- Cornelio Villareal - Speaker of the House of Representatives of the Philippines from 1962 to 1967, and from 1971 to 1972
- Josepha Abiertas - was the first woman to graduate from the school
- Ramon Bagatsing - was Mayor of Manila from 1971 to 1986
- Alberto Segismundo Cruz - poet, short story writer and novelist
- Manuel S. Enverga - founder of Manuel S. Enverga University Foundation
- Jose Garvida Flores - poet and playwright
- León María Guerrero III - was ambassador to the United Kingdom (1954 to 1962), Spain (1962 to 1966), India (1966 to 1973), Mexico (1973 to 1977) and Yugoslavia (1977 to 1980)
- Antonio Horrilleno - was an associate justice of the Supreme Court of the Philippines
- Santiago Lucero - was a member of the 3rd Congress of the Republic for Cebu's 6th District from 1954 to 1956
- Felixberto Serrano - was Secretary of Foreign Affairs under President Carlos P. Garcia from 1957 to 1961
- Jose B. Lingad - provincial governor of Pampanga from 1948 to 1951 and congressman from Pampanga from 1969 to 1972.
