= Philippine House Committee on Agriculture and Food =

Standing committee of the House of Representatives of the Philippines

Committee on Agriculture and Food
- 20th Congress

History
- New session started: July 28, 2025

Leadership
- Chair: Mark Enverga, NPC since July 30, 2025
- Minority Leader: Vacant since June 30, 2025

Website
- Committee on Agriculture and Food

The Philippine House Committee on Agriculture and Food, or House Agriculture and Food Committee is a standing committee of the Philippine House of Representatives.

== Jurisdiction ==
As prescribed by House Rules, the committee's jurisdiction includes the following:

- Agri-economics
- Agribusiness
- Agricultural education including extension services, soil conservation, soil survey and research
- Agricultural research and technology
- Animal industry and quarantine
- Crop and livestock production, insurance, and guarantee programs
- Farm credit and security
- Food and agricultural production
- Irrigation

== Senate Counterpart ==
The jurisdiction of the House Committee on Agriculture and Food has a counterpart in the Senate:

- Senate Committee on Agriculture, Food and Agrarian Reform

== Members, 20th Congress ==
Position	Member	Constituency	Party
Chairperson	Mark Enverga	Quezon–1st	NPC
Vice Chairpersons	Vacant		
Members for the Majority	Vacant		
Members for the Minority	Vacant		

== Historical membership rosters ==
=== 18th Congress ===
Position	Members	Party	Province/City	District
Chairperson	Wilfrido Mark Enverga	NPC	Quezon	1st
Vice Chairpersons	Florencio Noel	An Waray	Party-list	
Vice Chairpersons	Wilfredo Caminero	NUP	Cebu	2nd
Vice Chairpersons	Jose Francisco Benitez	PDP–Laban	Negros Occidental	3rd
Vice Chairpersons	Anna Marie Villaraza-Suarez	ALONA	Party-list	
Vice Chairpersons	Antonio Albano	NUP	Isabela	1st
Vice Chairpersons	Jose Ong Jr.	NUP	Northern Samar	2nd
Vice Chairpersons	Estrellita Suansing	PDP–Laban	Nueva Ecija	1st
Vice Chairpersons	Aleta Suarez	Lakas	Quezon	3rd
Vice Chairpersons	Rudys Caesar Fariñas I	Probinsyano Ako	Party-list	
Vice Chairpersons	Joseph Lara	PDP–Laban	Cagayan	3rd
Vice Chairpersons	Ansaruddin Abdul Malik Adiong	Nacionalista	Lanao del Sur	1st
Members for the Majority	Resurreccion Acop	NUP	Antipolo	2nd
Members for the Majority	Samantha Louise Vargas-Alfonso	NUP	Cagayan	2nd
Members for the Majority	Julienne Baronda	NUP	Iloilo City	Lone
Members for the Majority	Alfelito Bascug	NUP	Agusan del Sur	1st
Members for the Majority	Juliette Uy	NUP	Misamis Oriental	2nd
Members for the Majority	Vicente Veloso III	NUP	Leyte	3rd
Members for the Majority	Adolph Edward Plaza	NUP	Agusan del Sur	2nd
Members for the Majority	Rashidin Matba	PDP–Laban	Tawi-Tawi	Lone
Members for the Majority	Faustino Michael Dy V	NUP	Isabela	6th
Members for the Majority	Alyssa Sheena Tan	PFP	Isabela	4th
Members for the Majority	Leonardo Babasa Jr.	PDP–Laban	Zamboanga del Sur	2nd
Members for the Majority	Ma. Angelica Amante-Matba	PDP–Laban	Agusan del Norte	2nd
Members for the Majority	Carl Nicolas Cari	PFP	Leyte	5th
Members for the Majority	Rosanna Vergara	PDP–Laban	Nueva Ecija	3rd
Members for the Majority	Alan 1 Ecleo	PDP–Laban	Dinagat Islands	Lone
Members for the Majority	Gerardo Espina Jr.	Lakas	Biliran	Lone
Members for the Majority	Jonathan Keith Flores	PDP–Laban	Bukidnon	2nd
Members for the Majority	Joselito Sacdalan	PDP–Laban	Cotabato	1st
Members for the Majority	Samier Tan	PDP–Laban	Sulu	1st
Members for the Majority	Manuel Sagarbarria	NPC	Negros Oriental	2nd
Members for the Majority	Noel Villanueva	NPC	Tarlac	3rd
Members for the Majority	Gerardo Valmayor Jr.	NPC	Negros Occidental	1st
Members for the Majority	Greg Gasataya	NPC	Bacolod	Lone
Members for the Majority	Gil Acosta	PPP	Palawan	3rd
Members for the Majority	Michael Gorriceta	Nacionalista	Iloilo	2nd
Members for the Majority	Ramon Guico III	Lakas	Pangasinan	5th
Members for the Majority	Lolita Javier	PFP	Leyte	2nd
Members for the Majority	Frederick Siao	Nacionalista	Iligan	Lone
Members for the Majority	Rogelio Neil Roque	Nacionalista	Bukidnon	4th
Members for the Majority	Jose Tejada	Nacionalista	Cotabato	1st
Members for the Majority	Eugenio Angelo Barba	Nacionalista	Ilocos Norte	2nd
Members for the Majority	Manuel Zubiri	Bukidnon Paglaum	Bukidnon	3rd
Members for the Majority	Lorna Silverio	NUP	Bulacan	3rd
Members for the Majority	Fernando Cabredo	PDP–Laban	Albay	3rd
Members for the Majority	Mercedes Cagas	Nacionalista	Davao del Sur	Lone
Members for the Majority	Micaela Violago	NUP	Nueva Ecija	2nd
Members for the Majority	Solomon Chungalao	NPC	Ifugao	Lone
Members for the Majority	Alan Dujali	PDP–Laban	Davao del Norte	2nd
Members for the Majority	Princess Rihan Sakaluran	NUP	Sultan Kudarat	1st
Members for the Majority	Kristine Singson-Meehan	Bileg Ti Ilokano	Ilocos Sur	2nd
Members for the Majority	Arnulf Bryan Fuentebella	NPC	Camarines Sur	4th
Members for the Majority	Faustino Michael Carlos Dy III	PFP	Isabela	5th
Members for the Majority	Ian Paul Dy	NPC	Isabela	3rd
Members for the Majority	Abdullah Dimaporo	NPC	Lanao del Norte	2nd
Members for the Majority	Dahlia Loyola	NPC	Cavite	5th
Members for the Majority	Amihilda Sangcopan	Anak Mindanao	Party-list	
Members for the Majority	Ma. Lucille Nava	PDP–Laban	Guimaras	Lone
Members for the Majority	Maricel Natividad-Nagaño	PRP	Nueva Ecija	4th
Members for the Majority	Virgilio Lacson	MANILA TEACHERS	Party-list	
Members for the Majority	Geraldine Roman	PDP–Laban	Bataan	1st
Members for the Majority	Macnell Lusotan	MARINO	Party-list	
Members for the Majority	Shirlyn Bañas-Nograles	PDP–Laban	South Cotabato	1st
Members for the Majority	Josephine Ramirez-Sato	Liberal	Occidental Mindoro	Lone
Members for the Majority	Sabiniano Canama	COOP-NATCCO	Party-list	
Members for the Majority	Sharon Garin	AAMBIS-OWA	Party-list	
Members for the Majority	Roger Mercado	Lakas	Southern Leyte	Lone
Members for the Minority	Argel Joseph Cabatbat	MAGSASAKA	Party-list	
Members for the Minority	Isagani Amatong	Liberal	Zamboanga del Norte	3rd
Members for the Minority	Gabriel Bordado Jr.	Liberal	Camarines Sur	3rd
Members for the Minority	Eufemia Cullamat	Bayan Muna	Party-list	
Members for the Minority	Arnolfo Teves Jr.	PDP–Laban	Negros Oriental	3rd
Members for the Minority	Arlene Brosas	GABRIELA	Party-list	

==== Members for the Majority ====
- Francisco Datol Jr. (Note: Died on August 10, 2020.) (SENIOR CITIZENS)
- Nestor Fongwan (Note: Died on December 18, 2019.) (Benguet–Lone, PDP–Laban)

== See also ==
- House of Representatives of the Philippines
- List of Philippine House of Representatives committees
- Department of Agriculture
- Agriculture in the Philippines
