= Josepha Abiertas =

Filipino lawyer and feminist

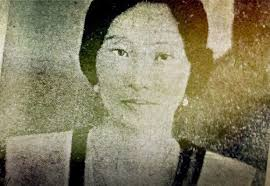
- Born: c. 1894; Capiz, Captaincy General of the Philippines
- Died: 1929 (aged 34–35); Manila, Insular Government of the Philippine Islands
- Education: Philippine Law School
- Occupations: Lawyer and feminist
- Known for: First woman to graduate with a degree from the Philippine Law School

Josepha Abiertas (1894–1929) was a Filipino lawyer and feminist. She was the first woman to graduate with a degree from the Philippine Law School.

== Early life ==
Abiertas was born in Capiz in the Philippines. She had a younger brother and they were orphaned when she was 8 years old. She was educated at the Baptist Home School in Capiz, after it was opened in 1904 by missionaries, then Capiz High School. Abiertas was valedictorian for her class.

She moved to Manila to attend the Philippine Law School and became the first woman to graduate with a law degree from the school. Whilst studying, Abiretas won the First Annual Oratorical Contest held at the school on 18 March 1917. She was admitted to the bar on September 27, 1920, with the highest rating in the examination.

== Career and death ==
As a lawyer, Abiertas fought for workers rights and farmers rights. Abiertas was also involved in advocating for equal rights for women in the Philippines, including women's suffrage. She wrote a lecture called "The New Age for Women." Abiertas was a Baptist, supporter of the YMCA and a member of the Women's Christian Temperance Union of Manila. bAbiertas died in 1929 of tuberculosis.

== Legacy ==
After her death, the Josepha Abiertas House of Friendship in Quezon City, which supported "unwed mothers and fatherless children" was founded. One of the founders was social worker and suffragist Josefa Jara Martinez.
