= Manuel S. Enverga =

Filipino lawyer and politician (1909–1981)

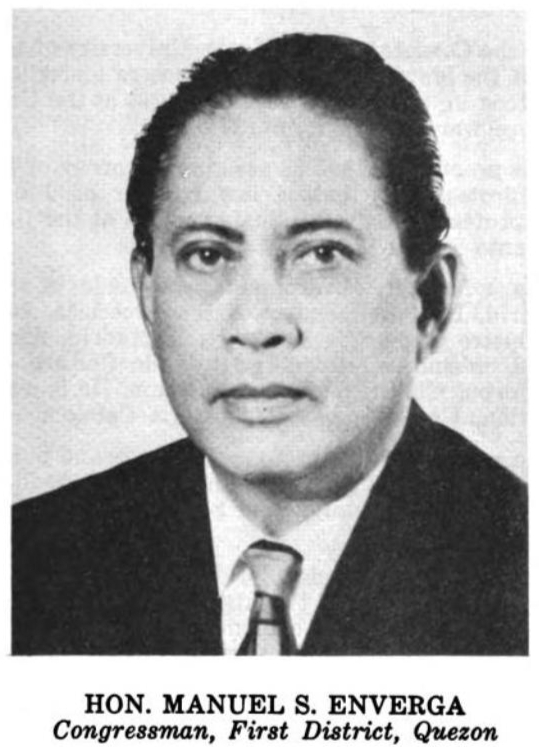
- Official portrait as member of the Philippine House of Representatives, c. 1967

Member of the Philippine House of Representatives from Quezon's 1st district
- In office December 30, 1953 – December 30, 1969
- Preceded by: Narciso H. Umali
- Succeeded by: Moises A. Escueta

Personal details
- Born: January 1, 1909 Mauban, Tayabas, Philippine Islands, U.S.
- Died: June 14, 1981 (aged 72)
- Party: Nacionalista
- Relatives: Mark Enverga (grandson)
- Education: University of Santo Tomas (AA, LLM); Philippine Law School (LLB); Universidad Central de Madrid (LLD)

Manuel Sarmiento Enverga (January 1, 1909 – June 14, 1981) was a Filipino lawyer and politician who became representative of Quezon's 1st congressional district from 1953 to 1969.

== Early life and education ==
Enverga was born on January 1, 1909, in Mauban, Tayabas (now Quezon) to farmers Jose Pastrana Enverga and Romana Sarmiento. He studied at Mauban Elementary School, National University High School, University of Santo Tomas (Associates in Arts), and Philippine Law School (Bachelor of Laws). He passed the bar examination in 1938. During his undergraduate studies, he took classes at the Conservatory of Music in the University of the Philippines, Manila and was a member of the symphony orchestra under Alexander Lippay. He received his Master of Laws (meritissimus) from the University of Santo Tomas and his Doctor of Laws (sobresaliente) from Universidad Central de Madrid in Spain.

Before World War II, he also took a course on Foreign Service in the University of the Philippines.

== Career ==
=== As a lawyer ===
Enverga worked in the law office of Spanish lawyer Don Alfredo Chicote. He also worked as a partner of Judge Vicente del Rosario. He was then made Professor of the Graduate School of the University of Santo Tomas due to his success as a lawyer.

In 1947, he was the president and founder of the Luzonian Colleges in Lucena. That same year, he was a Filipino delegate to the Inter-Asian Relations Conference held in New Delhi, India. In 1950, he was delegate to the Education Conference Ibero-Americano in Madrid, Spain.

=== As a politician ===
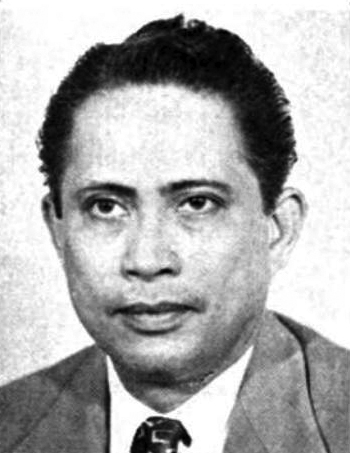
Enverga's official portrait during the 3rd Congress

Enverga was elected as a representative for Quezon's 1st congressional district in 1953. He was re-elected thrice thereafter. He stepped down at the end of his fourth term in 1969.

In 1955, he was a delegate to the 8th session of the UNESCO general conference in Montevideo, Uruguay. He was a delegate to the World Federation of United Nations in Geneva, Switzerland in 1956 and to the International Monetary Fund Conference in Washington, D.C., United States in 1960. In 1960, he was also delegate to the International Association of Universities Conference in Mexico City.

== Personal life ==
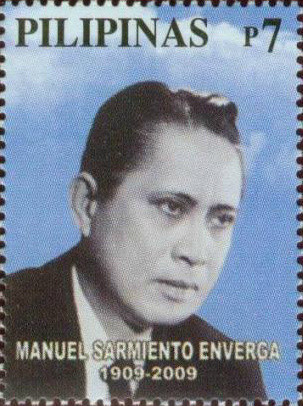
Enverga in a 2009 postal stamp

He was married to Rosario Lopez from Lucena on April 10, 1940. His son, Wilfrido, served as Governor of Quezon from 1998 to 2007. His other children are Naila, currently president and chief executive officer of Enverga University, Jazmin, and Manuel Jr.

After his retirement in politics, Enverga dedicated his time expanding the Luzonian Colleges. He died on June 14, 1981. In 1983, the Luzonian Colleges changed its name to Manuel S. Enverga University Foundation in his honor.
