= 1975 Palanca Awards =

Philippine literary award

25th Palanca Awards

The 25th Don Carlos Palanca Memorial Awards for Literature was held to commemorate the memory of Don Carlos Palanca Sr. through an endeavor that would promote education and culture in the country.

LIST OF WINNERS

The 1975 winners were divided into six categories, open only to English and Filipino [Tagalog] short story, poetry, and one-act play:

== English Division ==
=== Short Story ===
- First Prize: Alfred A. Yuson, “Romance and Faith in Mount Banahaw”

Leoncio P. Deriada, “The Day of the Locusts”

- Second Prize: Jose Y. Dalisay Jr., “Agcalan Point”

Luning B. Ira, “Once Upon A Cruise: Generations and Other Languages”
Cirilo F. Bautista, “The Man Who Made a Covenant with the Wind”

- Third Prize: Benjamin Bautista and Linda Ledesma, “A Summer Goodbye”

Porfirio Villarin Jr., “Discovery”
Leoncio P. Deriada, “The Dog Eaters”
Mauro Avena, “The People's Prison”

=== Poetry ===
- First Prize: Cirilo F. Bautista, “Telex Moon”
- Second Prize: Wilfredo Pascua Sanchez, “Adarna: Six Poems from a Larger Corpus”
- Third Prize: Ricaredo Demetillo, “The City and the Thread of Life”

=== One-Act Play ===
- First Prize: Rolando S. Tinio, “A Life in the Slums”
- Second Prize: Paul Stephen Lim, “Password”
- Third Prize: Maidan T. Flores, “The Minerva Foundation”

== Filipino Division ==
=== Maikling Kwento ===
- First Prize: Jose Reyes Munsayac, “Ang Oktubre ay Buwan ng mga Talahib”

Domingo G. Landicho, "Huwag Mong Tangisan Ang Kamatayan ng Isang Pilipino sa Dibdib ng Niyebe"

- Second Prize: Ave Perez Jacob, "Guwardiya"

Benigno R. Juan, “Wala Nang Lawin sa Bukid ni Tata Felipe”

- Third Prize: Jun Cruz Reyes, “Mula Kay Tandang Iskong Basahan”

Alfonso Mendoza, “Silang mga Estatwa sa Buhay ni Valentin Dacuycoy”

=== Tula ===
- Special Prizes:

Rolando S. Tinio, “12 Tula”
Jose Carreon, “Ang Pamumuno ni Abunnawa”
Rosalinda Pineda, “Genesis at Iba pang Tula”
Lualhati Alvero, “Isang Tungkal na Alabok”
Mar. Al Tiburcio, “Nagbabalik ang Dakilang mga Gabi”
Gloria Villaraza Guzman, “Namimintana Ako”
Alberto S. Cruz, “Sino ang Bulag at Iba Pang Tula”
Bienvenido Lumbera, “Sunog sa Lipa at Iba Pang Tula”
Simon Mercado, “Tatlong Tula”
Victor V. Francisco, “Tsinataklipan: Ugat ng Angkan”

=== Dulang May Isang Yugto ===
- Special Prizes:

Manuel Pambid, “Buhay Batilyo”
Mars D. Cavestany Jr., “Isang Palabas”
Bienvenido Noriega Jr., “Kulay Rosas na Mura ang Isang Pangarap”
Benjamin P. Pascual, “Luha Para sa Yumao”
Reuel Molina Aguila, “Sidewalk Vendor”

== Sources ==
- "The Don Carlos Palanca Memorial Awards for Literature | Winners 1975". Archived from the original on 2009-10-22.
