= Mark Enverga =

Filipino politician

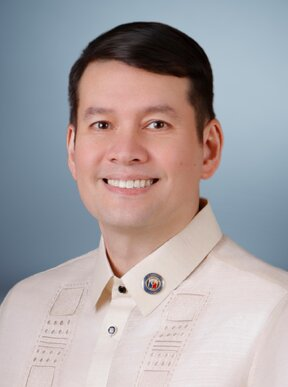
- Official portrait, 2026

Member of the Philippine House of Representatives from Quezon's 1st district
- Incumbent
- Assumed office June 30, 2019
- Preceded by: Katrina Enverga
- In office June 30, 2007 – June 30, 2016
- Preceded by: Rafael Nantes
- Succeeded by: Katrina Enverga

Chairperson of the House Committee on Agriculture and Food
- Incumbent
- Assumed office July 22, 2019
- Preceded by: Position established

Spokesperson of the Nationalist People's Coalition
- Incumbent
- Assumed office 2016

Legislative Caretaker of Valenzuela's 1st congressional district
- In office February 6, 2023 – June 30, 2025

Personal details
- Born: Wilfrido Mark McCormick Enverga; March 25, 1978 (age 48) Manila, Philippines
- Party: NPC (2010–present); Stan Q (local party; 2024–present)
- Other political affiliations: Nacionalista (2007–2010); KAMPI (until 2007)
- Spouse: Mary Joanne Enverga
- Relations: Manuel Enverga (grandfather)
- Children: 2
- Parents: Wilfrido Enverga (father); Mary Grace McCormick (mother)
- Education: Les Roches; Southern New Hampshire University
- Occupation: Politician

Wilfrido Mark McCormick Enverga (born March 25, 1978) is a Filipino politician serving as a representative for Quezon's 1st congressional district since 2019 and previously from 2007 to 2016. He is a son of former Quezon Governor Wilfrido Enverga and grandson of former representative Manuel S. Enverga.

== Early life and education ==
Mark Enverga was born in Manila to Wilfrido Enverga, who would later serve as 1st district representative and governor of Quezon, and Mary Grace McCormick. He is the only son, with two other siblings. He is also the grandson of Manuel S. Enverga, a former congressman and founder of the Luzonian Colleges (now Manuel S. Enverga University Foundation).

Enverga studied at Les Roches, where he graduated with a diploma in Hotel and Restaurant Administration in 1999. He attended at Southern New Hampshire University and graduated with a Bachelor of Applied Science in Hospitality Administration in 2001 and a post-graduate Masters of Business Administration in 2003. He took a special course on governance in Ateneo de Manila School of Government.

== Political career ==
=== House of Representatives (2007–2016) ===
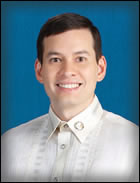
Enverga official portrait during the 16th Congress

Enverga ran as a representative under the Nacionalista Party for Quezon's 1st congressional district in 2007 and was elected. He was reelected in 2010 and 2013. During that time, he was a member of the House of Representatives Electoral Tribunal and House Committee on Rural Development. He switched to the Nationalist People's Coalition (NPC) in 2010. He served until 2016, when he became term-limited. He was succeeded by his sister Katrina.

=== Return to House of Representatives (2019–present) ===
Enverga was elected again in 2019. He also serves as a chairperson of the House Committee on Agriculture and Food since 2019. He was reelected in 2022 and in 2025.

On February 6, 2023, he was named the legislative caretaker of Valenzuela's 1st district, which became vacant as a result of NPC partymate Rex Gatchalian's appointment as Secretary of Social Welfare and Development, for the rest of the 19th Congress.

== Electoral history ==
Electoral history of Mark Enverga
Year	Office	Party		Votes received				Result
Year	Office	Local	National	Total	%	P.	Swing	Result
2007	Representative (Quezon–1st)	—N/a	KAMPI	74,921	—N/a	1st	—N/a	Won
2010	Representative (Quezon–1st)	—N/a	Nacionalista	109,508	56.20%	1st	—N/a	Won
2013	Representative (Quezon–1st)	—N/a	NPC	108,714	71.96%	1st	—N/a	Won
2019	Representative (Quezon–1st)	—N/a	NPC	179,831	100.00%	1st	—N/a	Unopposed
2022	Representative (Quezon–1st)	—N/a	NPC	277,126	86.18%	1st	—N/a	Won
2025	Representative (Quezon–1st)	Stan Q	NPC	252,236	100.00%	1st	—N/a	Unopposed
