= Manuel S. Enverga University Foundation =

Private university in Lucena, Philippines

- Pamantasang Manuel S. Enverga (Filipino)
- Former names: Luzonian Colleges (1947–1968); Luzonian University (1968–1970); Luzonian University Foundation (1970–1983); Manuel S. Enverga University Foundation (1983–2009)
- Motto: Pro Deo Et Patria (Latin)
- Motto in English: For God and Country
- Type: Private, Non-sectarian
- Established: February 11, 1947
- Affiliations: UNAI, PACUCOA, STCAA, PRISAA.
- President: Naila Enverga Leveriza, MBA
- Administrative staff: 605
- Students: 6,132
- Undergraduates: 5,304
- Postgraduates: 828
- Location: Lucena, Quezon, Philippines; 13°56′58″N 121°37′19″E
- Campus: University Campus Early Childhood Center MSEUF Candelaria MSEUF Catanauan MSEAFI Sampaloc MSEIF San Antonio MSEUFI Calauag
- Hymn: Maroon and White Forever
- Colors: Maroon and White
- Nickname: Envergan Wildcats
- Mascot: Roonie The Wildcat
- Website: mseuf.edu.ph

- Location in Luzon Location in the Philippines

Manuel S. Enverga University Foundation (MSEUF), also known as Enverga University (EU), is a private, non-sectarian university situated in Lucena, Quezon, Philippines. The university is named after its founder, Dr. Manuel Sarmiento Enverga.

MSEUF has the second highest number of accredited academic college degrees/programs offered in the whole Southern Tagalog Region, behind University of the Philippines Los Banos.

The university also has satellite campuses in Candelaria, Catanauan, Sampaloc, San Antonio, and Calauag — all of which are located within Quezon.

== History and Foundation ==
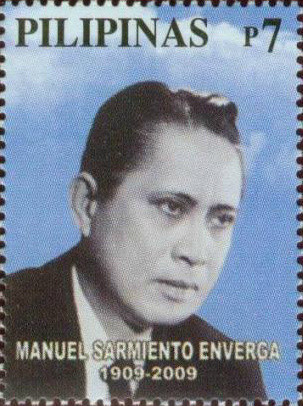
Manuel S. Enverga on a 2009 stamp of the Philippines

=== Luzonian Colleges ===
The Manuel S. Enverga University Foundation was built after World War II. The debilitating aftermath of the war brought education to a halt. The economic dislocation that ensued left many young people of school age with little chance of getting an education. Parents from many parts of Quezon Province had to mortgage their lands or sell their last carabao to send their children to college in Manila. The situation presented both a challenge and an opportunity to a group of pioneering and vision-driven individuals led by Dr. Manuel S. Enverga who founded the Luzonian Colleges on January 14, 1947, to give needy students access to higher education.

The Securities and Exchange Commission granted Luzonian Colleges its charter on February 11, 1947. A little more than a month later, the Bureau of Private Schools issued a government permit for the school to open in April 1947.

In the summer of 1947, 102 students, mostly youthful war veterans, enrolled in the two-year Associate in Arts program in the College of Liberal Arts, the first college to be established. The secretarial course opened on May 2, 1947, even as the young college obtained official permission to open the secondary school and the education programs in June 1947. Meanwhile, in 1948 heeding the clamor of the citizens of Sampaloc, Quezon, a high school was put up in that town.

Barely two years after, the College of Law opened to serve the needs of Associate in Arts graduates who wanted to take up law at nighttime. The complete commerce program was given the authority to open on October 5, 1949. The year 1950 saw the opening of a satellite campus in Catanauan, Quezon. The Institute of Graduate Studies and Research and the College of Engineering opened in 1955, giving Luzonian students more varied career choices. The San Antonio, Quezon campus was set up on June 22, 1959. In 1960, the school started to offer technical courses and two years later, the College of Architecture, became a fully independent academic program from the College of Engineering.

=== The University ===
The Luzonian Colleges attained full university status on August 8, 1968, with education secretary Onofre D. Corpus signing the university charter. Two years later, on February 12, 1970, the Luzonian University became a foundation, a strategic decision that demonstrated the civic-mindedness of its founders and incorporators who donated their shares of stocks to the University.

Founder-president Dr. Manuel S. Enverga died on June 14, 1981, secure in the knowledge that the university he founded would continue to serve the citizens of Quezon and the rest of Luzon. The Board of Trustees approved the renaming of the Luzonian University Foundation to Manuel S. Enverga University Foundation in 1983 in recognition of the founder-president's magnanimity.

Meanwhile, the Institute of Physical Education and Sports began to operate in 1979 as an adjunct of the College of Education while the College of Criminology and Law Enforcement, that used to be under the umbrella of the College of Arts and Sciences, became a full-fledged college in 1986. Similarly, the citizens of Candelaria, Quezon gathered written petitions for a satellite campus to open in the area.

Thus, on June 15, 1992, with the required physical plant and laboratory facilities in place, the Candelaria campus started its operations. The Department of Education, Culture and Sports gave full recognition to the secondary education program on December 18, 1992. The full permit for the college programs was released in 1995.

The global need for competent mariners spurred the opening of the Institute of Maritime Studies in 1993. The BS Tourism program was offered in 1997 under the College of Arts and Sciences. Two years later, the program was merged with the Institute of Hotel and Restaurant Management organized in 1995 due to the parallelism and similarity of courses, faculty and laboratory requirements.

Meanwhile, the Environmental Science and Public Administration programs were offered in school year 2000–01 in response to the growing need for professionals in environmental management and preservation and public governance.

The Manuel S. Enverga University Foundation offers various postgraduate programs in the liberal arts, education, physical education, business administration, public administration, and computer studies, and undergraduate programs in the arts and sciences, public administration, accountancy, business administration, law, education, engineering, criminology and law enforcement, architecture and fine arts, computer studies, maritime education and also technical courses.

On March 11, 2009, the Commission on Higher Education granted autonomous status to the university. At that time, the university shortened and applied the name "Enverga University".

== Board of trustees ==
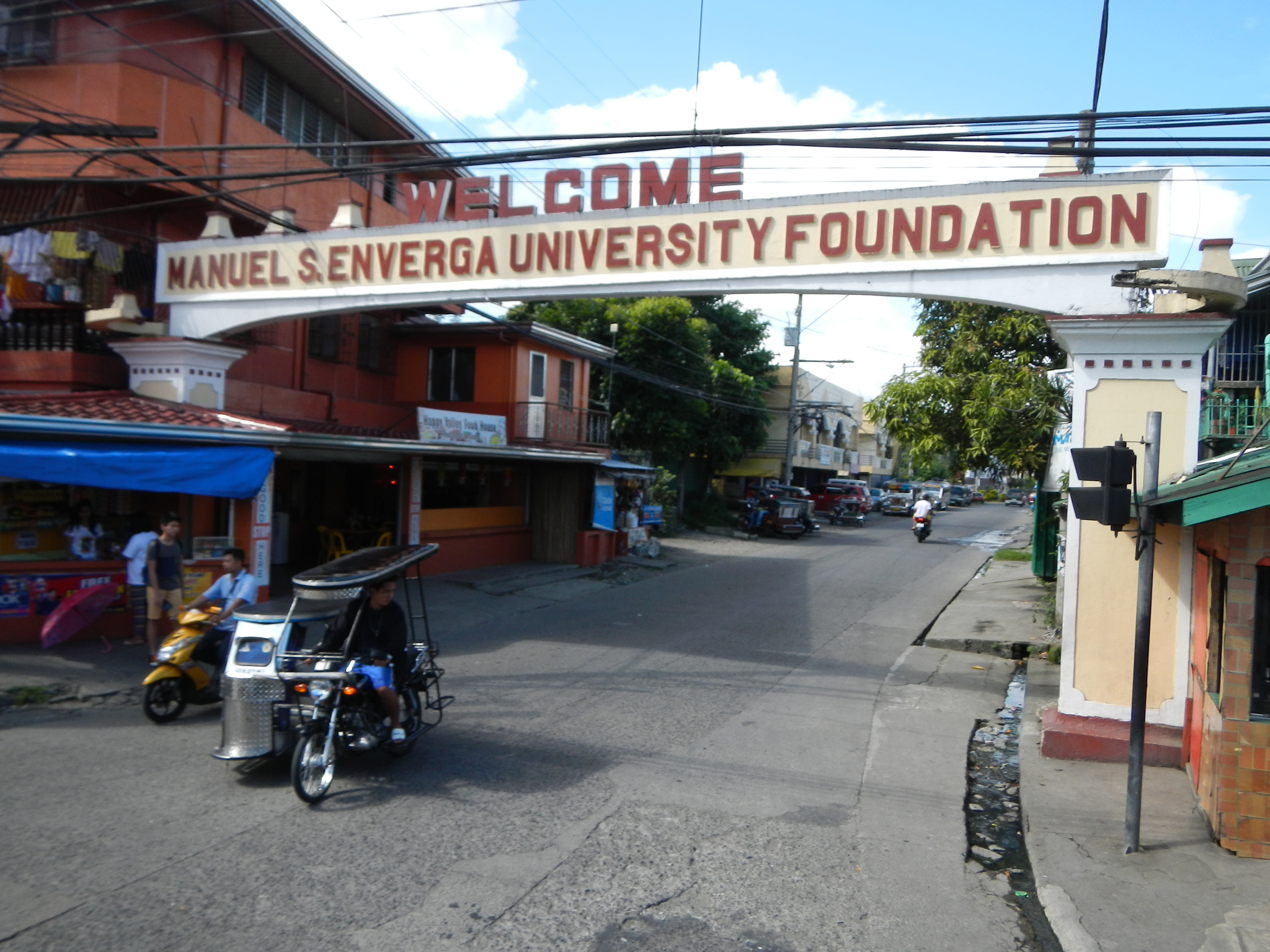
Manuel S. Enverga University Foundation Welcome Arch

Position	Board Member
Chairman	WILFRIDO L. ENVERGA, Ll.B. MBA.
Trustee	WILFRIDO MARK M. ENVERGA, MBA.
Trustee	CARLITO O. ENVERGA, Ll. B.
Trustee	JOSE S. LAURELES, Ll. B
Trustee	NAILA E. LEVERIZA, MBA
Trustee	TERENCE E. LEVERIZA, MD
Trustee	BUENAVENTURA L. QUILING
Trustee	VERONICA E. VILLANUEVA, AR
Trustee	BENILDA N. VILLENAS, Ph.D.

== Executive committee ==
Position	Executives
President	NAILA E. LEVERIZA, MBA
VP for Academics	BENILDA N. VILLENAS, Ph.D.
VP for Administration	ATTY. DARIO OPISTAN, CPA
VP for External Relations	CELSO D. JABALLA, MA

== College departments ==
Enverga University Gym

- Architecture and Fine Arts (CAFA)
- Arts and Sciences (CAS) – PACUCOA Level IV
- Business and Accountancy (CBA) – PACUCOA Level III- BSBA; Level IV
- Enverga Law School (ELS)
- Computing and Multimedia Studies (CCMS) – PACUCOA Level III
- Criminal Justice and Criminology (CCJC) – PACUCOA Level II
- Education (CEd) – PACUCOA Level IV
- Engineering (CEng) – PACUCOA Level II
- Graduate Studies and Research (IGSR) – PACUCOA Level II
- Maritime Studies (CME)- ISO 9001: 2015 Certified
- Physical Education and Sports (IPES)
- International Hospitality and Tourism Management (CIHTM)- PACUCOA Level II
- Basic Education Department (BED)- PACUCOA Level II
- Rosarian Centre Creative Educational Foundation, Inc. (RCCEFI)
- Expanded Tertiary Education Equivalency and Accreditation Program (ETEEAP)

== Notable alumni ==
- Ahtisa Manalo, BSA – Miss Universe 2025 3rd Runner-Up
- Betty Baronia, ABPsych - Filipino psychologist; UN-CISMU external mental health practitioner
- Bonifacio Bosita, BSCE – Filipino politician; former 1-Rider Partylist representative and 2025 Philippine senatorial candidate
- Jenny Miller – TV & film actress
- Maureen Marcelo – singer-songwriter formerly under Sony BMG and the first winner of Philippine Idol
- Orlan Calayag, BSBA – Mayor of Dolores, Quezon and former administrator of the National Food Authority (NFA)
- Proceso Alcala, BSCE – Filipino politician and 12th Secretary of the Department of Agriculture
- Ysmael Baysa, BSBA – former-CFO of Jollibee Foods Corp. and current COO of Filinvest Development Corp.

== International linkages ==
Asia

- Fujian, China
- Macau, China
- Jakarta, Indonesia
- Osaka, Japan
- Tokyo, Japan
- Kuala Lumpur, Malaysia
- Petaling Jaya, Malaysia
- Singapore
- Incheon, South Korea
- Seoul, South Korea
- Khlong Luang, Thailand
- (Emirate of Abu Dhabi) Abu Dhabi, United Arab Emirates
- (Emirate of Dubai) Dubai, United Arab Emirates
- Hanoi, Vietnam
- Thái Nguyên, Vietnam

North America

- Port Coquitlam, British Columbia, Canada
- Chico, California, United States of America
