= Legislative districts of Quezon =

Legislative district of the Philippines

Legislative districts of Quezon.

The legislative districts of Quezon are the representations of the province of Quezon and the highly urbanized city of Lucena in the various national legislatures of the Philippines. The province and the city are currently represented in the lower house of the Congress of the Philippines through their first, second, third, and fourth congressional districts.

== History ==
Areas now under the jurisdiction of Quezon, known as Tayabas until 1949, were initially represented by the at-large district of Tayabas, which elected three representatives, and the at-large district of Principe and Infanta to the Malolos Congress in 1898; it remained so until 1899. Tayabas was later divided into two representative districts in 1907 for the Philippine Assembly. Marinduque was last represented as part of the province's second district in 1922, after its establishment as a regular province in 1920 warranted its separate representation. As a consequence, a minor reorganization of the composition of the districts of Tayabas took place to compensate for the reduced population of the second district. When seats for the upper house of the Philippine Legislature were elected from territory-based districts between 1916 and 1935, the province formed part of the fifth senatorial district which elected two out of the 24-member senate.

In the disruption caused by the Second World War, Tayabas was represented by two delegates in the National Assembly of the Japanese-sponsored Second Philippine Republic: one was the provincial governor (an ex officio member), while the other was elected through a provincial assembly of KALIBAPI members during the Japanese occupation of the Philippines. Its jurisdiction excluded the municipality of Infanta (including what is now General Nakar and Real) and the Polillo Islands, which were transferred to Laguna's jurisdiction. Upon the restoration of the Philippine Commonwealth in 1945, Tayabas's pre-war two-district representation was retained; this remained so until 1972.

The province of Quezon (with the sub-province of Aurora, established in 1951) was represented in the Interim Batasang Pambansa as part of Region IV-A from 1978 to 1984. The sub-province of Aurora was last represented as part of Quezon's first district in 1972, and as part of Quezon's representation in general in 1984, after its conversion into a regular province in 1979 entitled it to its own representation. The province elected four representatives at-large to the Regular Batasang Pambansa in 1984. It was redistricted into four congressional districts under the new Constitution which took effect on February 7, 1987, and elected members to the restored House of Representatives starting that same year.

Despite being administratively independent from the provincial government of Quezon since July 1, 1991, the city of Lucena elects a congressional representative as part of the second district, and has retained the right for its residents to elect and be elected to provincial offices through the exception made in Section 452-c of the Local Government Code of 1991 regarding a city declared as highly urbanized after 1986 but before 1992 and whose city charter (Republic Act No. 3271) contains a provision explicitly allowing participation in provincial affairs.

== Current composition ==
The province is composed of four districts, each electing one member, with three from NPC and one from Lakas. All are members of the majority bloc.

Legislative districts and representatives of Quezon
District	Current Representative	Party	Constituencies	Population (2020)	Area (km^{2})	Map
1st	Wilfrido Mark McCormick Enverga (since 2019); Mauban	NPC	List: Tayabas; Burdeos; General Nakar; Infanta; Jomalig; Lucban; Mauban; Pagbilao; Panukulan; Patnanungan; Polillo; Real; Sampaloc	573,895	4,178.81	
2nd	David Catarina Suarez (since 2019); Tiaong	Lakas–CMD	List: Lucena; Candelaria; Dolores; Sariaya; San Antonio; Tiaong	753,343	825.38	
3rd	Reynante Uy Arrogancia (since 2022); Pitogo	NPC	List: Agdangan; Buenavista; Catanauan; General Luna; Macalelon; Mulanay; Padre Burgos; Pitogo; San Andres; San Francisco; San Narciso; Unisan	446,711	1,986.20	
4th	Keith Micah "Mike" De Luna Tan (since 2022); Gumaca	NPC	List: Alabat; Atimonan; Calauag; Guinayangan; Gumaca; Lopez; Perez; Plaridel; Quezon; Tagkawayan	455,434	2,079.21	

== Historical and defunct district boundaries ==
Tayabas, later Quezon, has been redistricted three times since 1907. It included territories of the current provinces of Aurora, Marinduque and parts of the current Santa Elena, Camarines Norte.

District boundary changes
Year	Map	District constituencies (City/Municipality)
1987–present
1987–present		1st: Tayabas; Burdeos, General Nakar, Infanta, Jomalig, Lucban, Mauban, Pagbilao, Panukulan, Patnanungan, Polillo, Real, Sampaloc
1987–present		2nd: Lucena; Candelaria, Dolores, Sariaya, San Antonio, Tiaong
1987–present		3rd: Agdangan, Buenavista, Catanauan, General Luna, Macalelon, Mulanay, Padre Burgos, Pitogo, San Andres, San Francisco, San Narciso, Unisan
1987–present		4th: Alabat, Atimonan, Calauag (including 9 Calauag-controlled Barangays now part of Santa Elena, Camarines Norte until 2001), Guinayangan, Gumaca, Lopez, Perez, Plaridel, Quezon, Tagkawayan
1922–1972
1922–1972		1st: Lucena; Baler, Burdeos, Candelaria, Casiguran, Dilasag, Dinalungan, Dingalan, Dipaculao, Dolores, General Nakar, Infanta, Jomalig, Lucban, Maria Aurora, Mauban, Pagbilao, Panukulan, Patnanungan, Polillo, Real, Sampaloc, San Antonio, San Luis, Sariaya, Tayabas, Tiaong
1922–1972		2nd: Agdangan, Alabat, Atimonan, Buenavista, Calauag (including 9 Calauag-controlled Barangays now part of Santa Elena, Camarines Norte), Catanauan, General Luna, Guinayangan, Gumaca, Lopez, Macalelon, Mulanay, Padre Burgos, Pitogo, Plaridel, Quezon, San Andres, San Francisco, San Narciso, Tagkawayan, Unisan
1907–1922
1907–1922		1st: Atimonan, Baler, Candelaria, Casiguran, Dolores, Infanta, Laguimanoc, Lucban, Lucena, Mauban, Pagbilao, Polillo, Sampaloc, Sariaya, Tayabas, Tiaong
1907–1922		2nd: Alabat, Boac, Calauag (including 9 Calauag-controlled Barangays then part of Capalonga, Camarines Norte, now part of Santa Elena, Camarines Norte), Catanauan, Gasan, Guinayangan, Gumaca, Lopez, Macalelon, Mogpog, Mulanay, Pitogo, Quezon, San Narciso, Santa Cruz, Torrijos, Unisan

=== At-large ===
==== 1898–1899 ====
Period	Representatives	Party
Malolos Congress; 1898–1899	Sofio Alandy	Katipunan
Malolos Congress; 1898–1899	José Espinosa	Katipunan
Malolos Congress; 1898–1899	Basilo Teodoro	Katipunan

==== 1943–1944 ====
Period	Representatives	Party
National Assembly; 1943–1944	Natalio A. Enriquez (ex officio)	KALIBAPI
National Assembly; 1943–1944	Tomas B. Morato	KALIBAPI

==== 1978–1986 ====
Period	Member of Parliament Mambabatas Pambansa	Party
Interim Batasang Pambansa; 1978–1984	Godofredo M. Tan	KBL
Interim Batasang Pambansa; 1978–1984	Medardo L. Tumagay	KBL
Interim Batasang Pambansa; 1978–1984	Cesar A. Villariba, Sr.	KBL
Regular Batasang Pambansa; 1984–1986	Cesar D. Bolaños	UNIDO
Regular Batasang Pambansa; 1984–1986	Bienvenido O. Marquez, Jr.	UNIDO
Regular Batasang Pambansa; 1984–1986	Hjalamar P. Quintana	UNIDO
Regular Batasang Pambansa; 1984–1986	Oscar F. Santos	UNIDO

== Redistricting ==
Quezon was last redistricted in 1987. Since then, two bills had been filed in the 17th and 18th Congress to reapportion the province's districts.

== See also ==
- Legislative district of Marinduque
- Legislative district of Aurora
