= Roma Point Bridge =

Future cable stayed bridge in Quezon Province

- Coordinates: 13°59′57″N 122°10′45″E
- Carries: 2 lanes of Perez–Alabat–Quezon Road
- Crosses: Silangan Pass
- Locale: Calauag and Quezon, Quezon
- Official name: Maharlika Secondary Road (MSR) Junction Canda–Hondagua–Roma Point Bridge; MSR Jct Canda–Hondagua–Roma Point–Quezon Road
- Named for: Agoho, Calauag, Quezon
- Maintained by: Department of Public Works and Highways

Characteristics
- Design: Steel cable-stayed bridge
- Total length: 1.7 km (1.1 mi)
- Longest span: 800 m (2,600 ft)
- No. of lanes: Two-lane single carriageway

History
- Construction start: 2018
- Construction cost: PH₱ 1 billion

The Roma Point Bridge is a 1.7 km (1.1 mi) cable-stayed bridge under construction between the towns of Quezon and Calauag in Quezon, Philippines. The bridge will connect Alabat Island and its three municipalities of Perez, Alabat, and Quezon with the rest of Luzon, which are separated by Silangan Pass. Once completed, it will be the longest bridge in Quezon province and the Calabarzon region.

== History ==
Alabat Island and its three municipalities of Perez, Alabat and Quezon, are separated from the rest of Luzon by Silangan Pass, a narrow passage between Lopez Bay and Calauag Bay to the west and east of the island, respectively. As such, the more than 43,000 people living on the island who have important business in Manila or the provincial capital Lucena have to take a 45-minute roll-on/roll-off ferry from the Port of Alabat that crosses Lopez Bay to the Port of Atimonan in Quezon Province. However, scheduled ferry service can be interrupted by inclement weather or mechanical problems in the ferries, which inconveniences travelers. Alternatively, travelers can take the shorter 15-minute boat ride across Silangan Pass to Barangay Agoho in Calauag, Quezon but these can only take passengers and cargo and not motor vehicles.

The provincial government of Quezon has long envisioned a bridge that would connect Alabat Island with the rest of the province to facilitate safer travel of people and cargo and to spur economic growth in the municipalities of the island. A feasibility study to determine the safest, most stable and most economical crossing to Alabat Island was commissioned by Quezon 4th district representative Angelina Tan and it was determined that a bridge across Silangan Pass is the best location. The Department of Public Works and Highways (DPWH) has allocated an initial funding of PH₱ 250 million out of the total estimated cost of PH₱ 1 billion for the construction of the bridge.

== Construction ==
In March 2018, a groundbreaking ceremony was held in Barangay Agoho in Calauag, Quezon, attended by DPWH secretary Mark Villar, Representative Tan, DPWH Region 4-A Director Samson Hebra and the mayors of Perez, Alabat and Quezon, marking the start of construction for the bridge. Early photos of the bridge's architectural plan showed a cable-stayed bridge design. To facilitate construction, the Hondagua-Roma Point Road which connects Barangay Agoho in Calauag, Quezon and Barangay Hondagua in Lopez had to be widened to accommodate four-wheeled vehicles. Construction of the bridge approach on the Lopez side also commenced. The concrete foundation of the piers have already been constructed by March 2020 and by November 2020, several piers on the bridge approach have already been erected. Once completed, it will be the longest bridge in Quezon Province, longer than the 300 m (980 ft) span of Kalilayan Bridge in Unisan, Quezon, which is the current record holder. It would also be the longest bridge in Calabarzon, until the Bataan–Cavite Interlink Bridge is completed. However, no date of completion has been set for the bridge.
