= Alabat =

Alabat may refer to the following:

- Alabat Island, island in the province of Quezon in the Philippines
- Alabat, Quezon, municipality on the island
- Inagta Alabat language, nearly extinct language on the island
