= Cagbalete =

Island in the Philippines

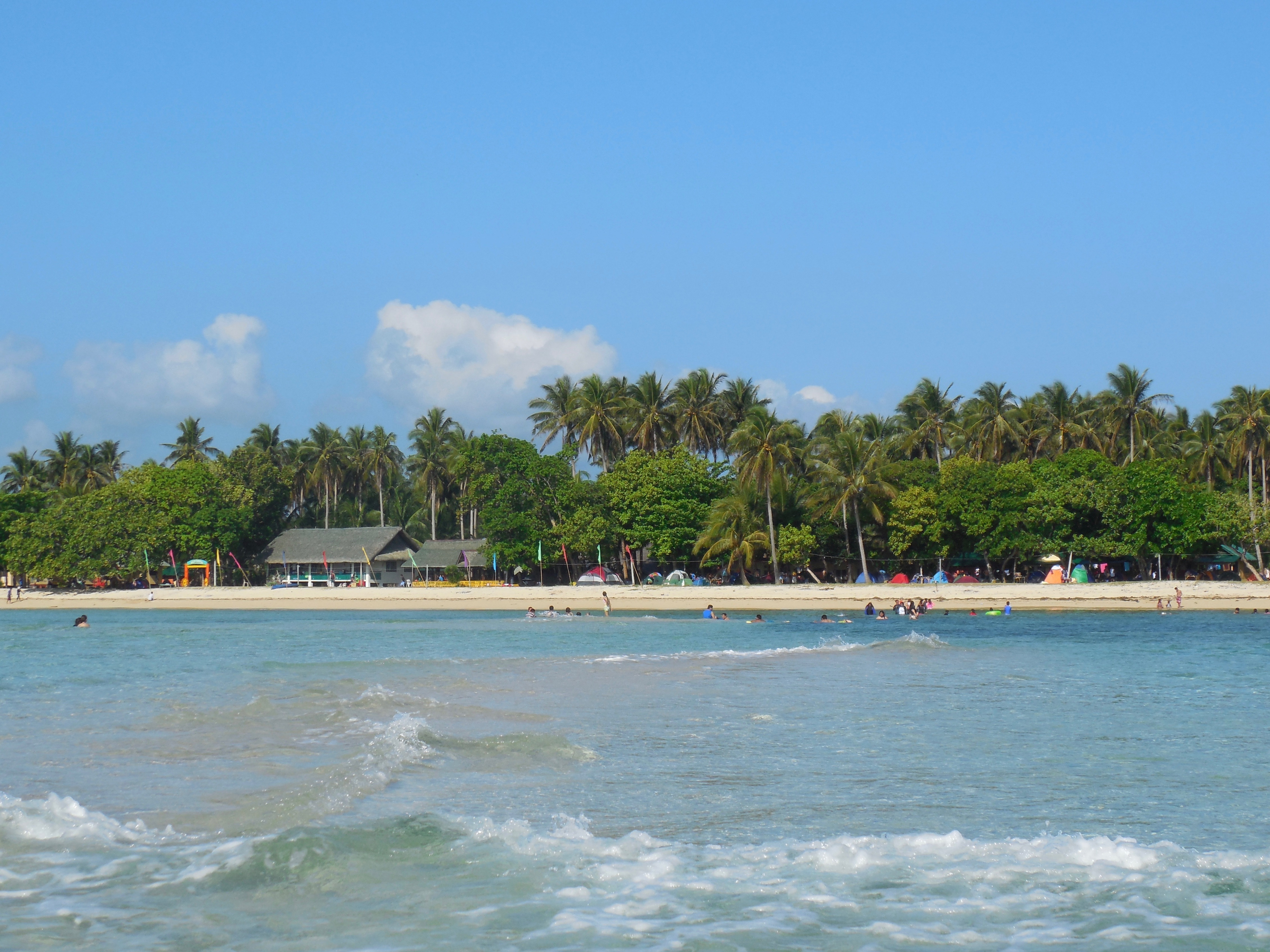
- Cagbalete Island in 2016
- Interactive map of Cagbalete

Geography
- Location: Lamon Bay
- Coordinates: 14.281°N 121.823°E
- Adjacent to: Philippine Sea

Administration
- Philippines
- Region: Calabarzon
- Province: Quezon
- Municipalities: Mauban

Demographics
- Population: 4,064 (2020)

Additional information

Cagbalete is an island off the east coast of Luzon, Philippines on Lamon Bay. It is part of Quezon Province and administered by the municipality of Mauban.

== History ==
On February 11, 1859, three Pansacola brothers named Benedicto, José, and Manuel purchased the island from the Spanish government. Then, on April 11, 1868, the brothers agreed to give a quarter of the island to the children of their deceased brother, Eustáquio. Since there were no actual measurements on how the island would be divided at the time, disputes came in later years. As of a Philippine Supreme Court Decision dated December 1, 1987, all titles on the island have been declared invalid.

Cagbalete Island now hosts two barangays, namely Barangay Cagbalete Uno and Barangay Cagabelete Dos. The land originally owned by Benedicto Pansacola and the descendants of Eustáquio Pansacola comprise the first barangay. The second barangay comprises the land originally owned by José Pansacola and Manuel Pansacola.

Many of the beach resorts in the island are named after the direct descendants of Benedicto Pansacola, who himself had one child named Atanacia, later known as Atanacia Villabona. She had two daughters: Leonila and María. Nilandingan Cove is owned by Lynette Del Banco, who is a descendant of Leonila and Remigio Del Banco. María, who married Silverio Taino, has children named Choleng (Dona Choleng Camping Resort), Noe (Villa Noe), Joven (Joven's Blue Sea), and Cleofas (Villa Cleofas). Four of the members of the Pansacola family have served as municipal mayors of Mauban, Quezon. They are Rudsend Pansacola, Remigio Del Banco (husband of Leonila Villabona-Del Banco), Silverio Taino (husband of Maria Villabona-Taino), and Amado Clemente (husband of Socorro Taino-Clemente and son-in-law of Silverio Taino).

== Gallery ==
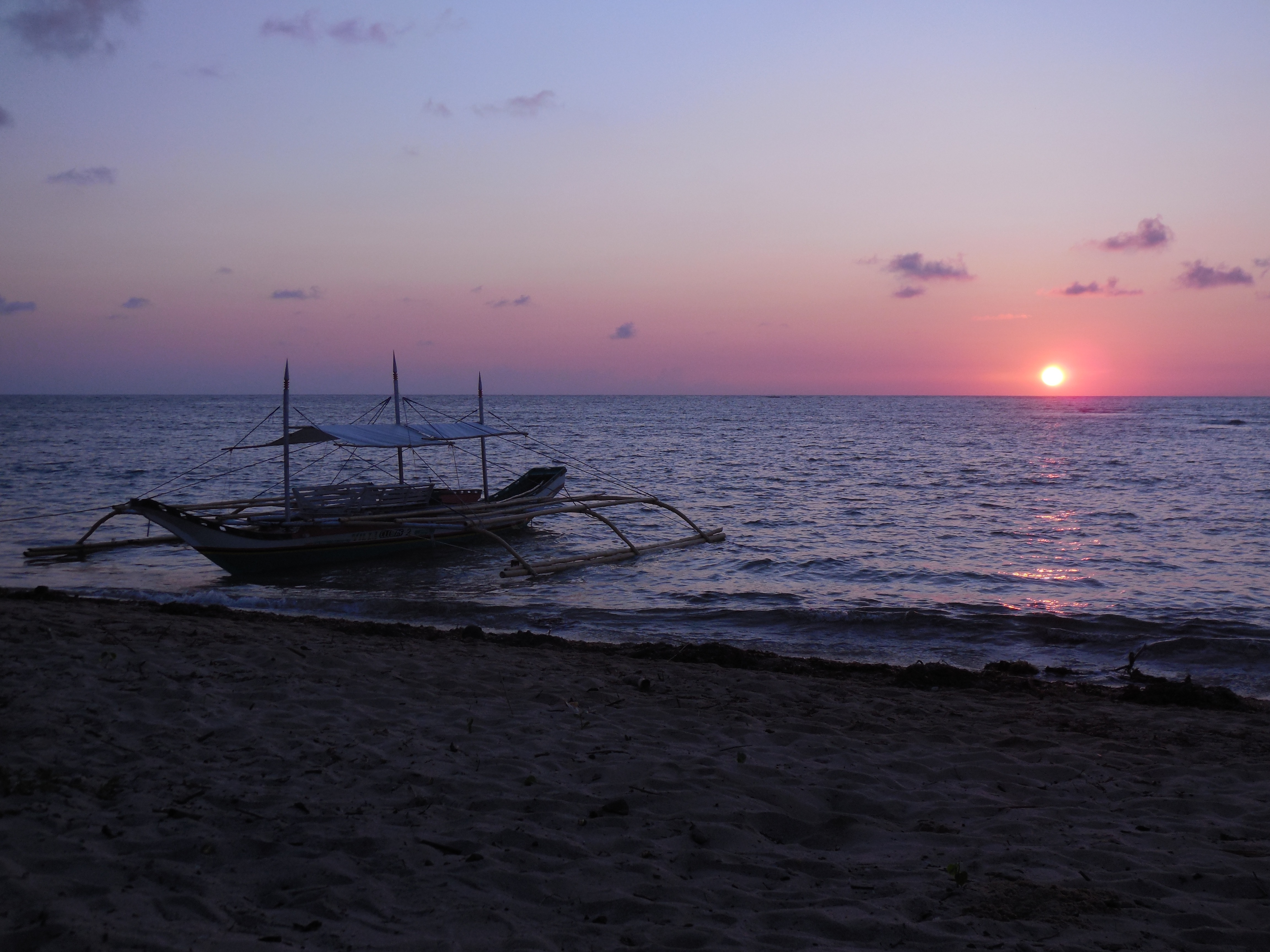
Sunrise in Cagbalete Island

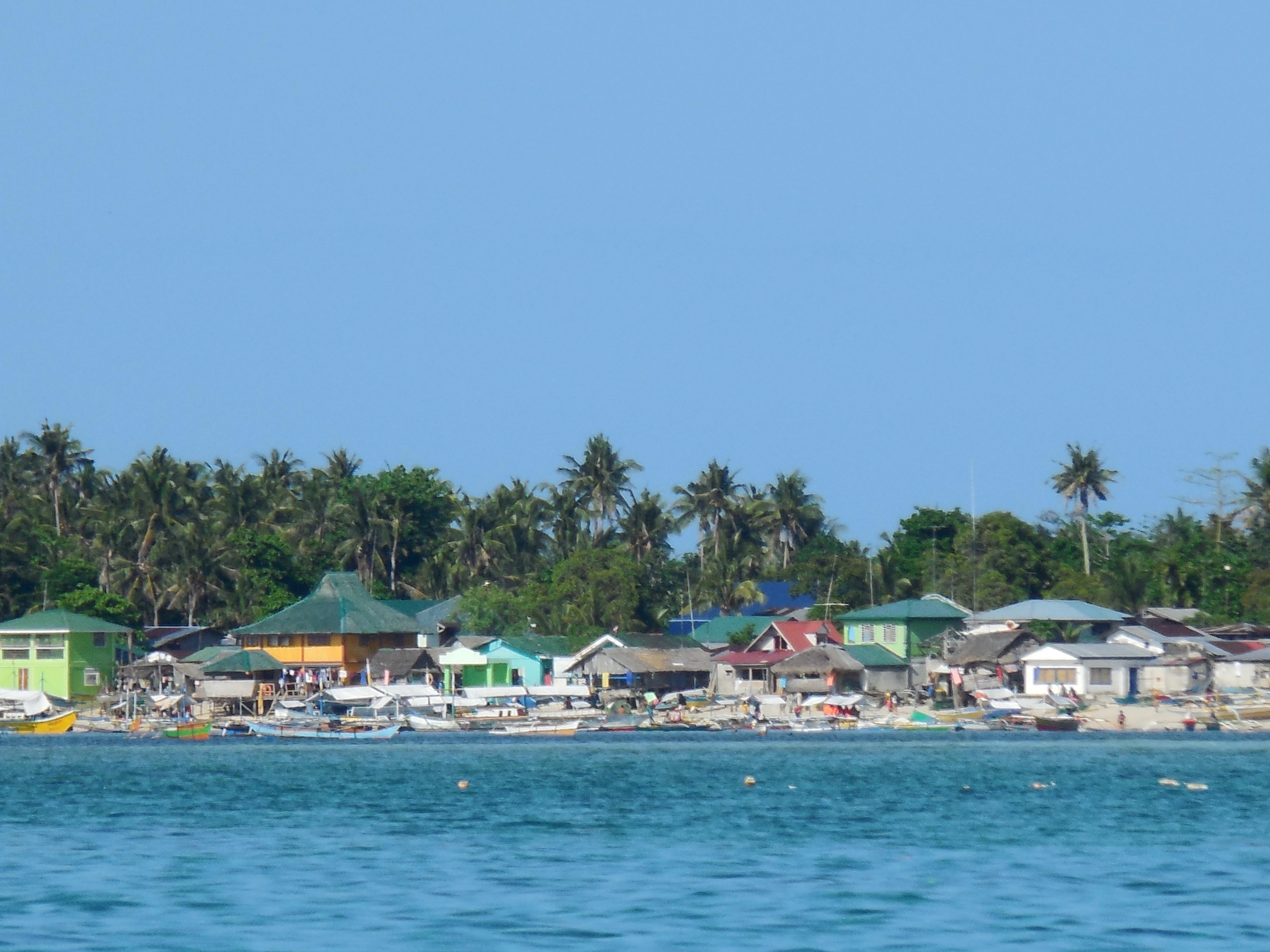
The main village at Cagbalete

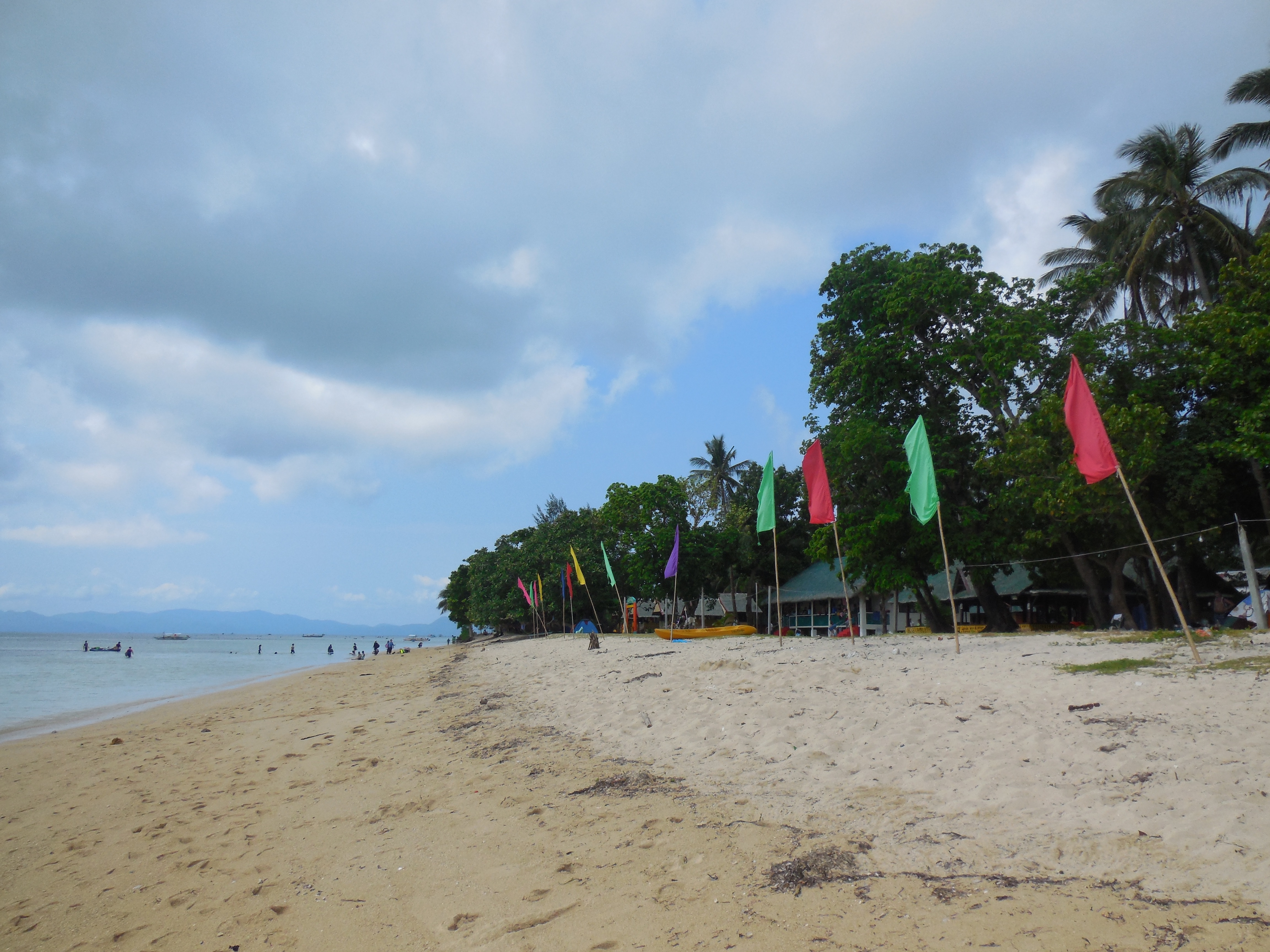
The beach at Villa Cleofas Resort in Cagbalete

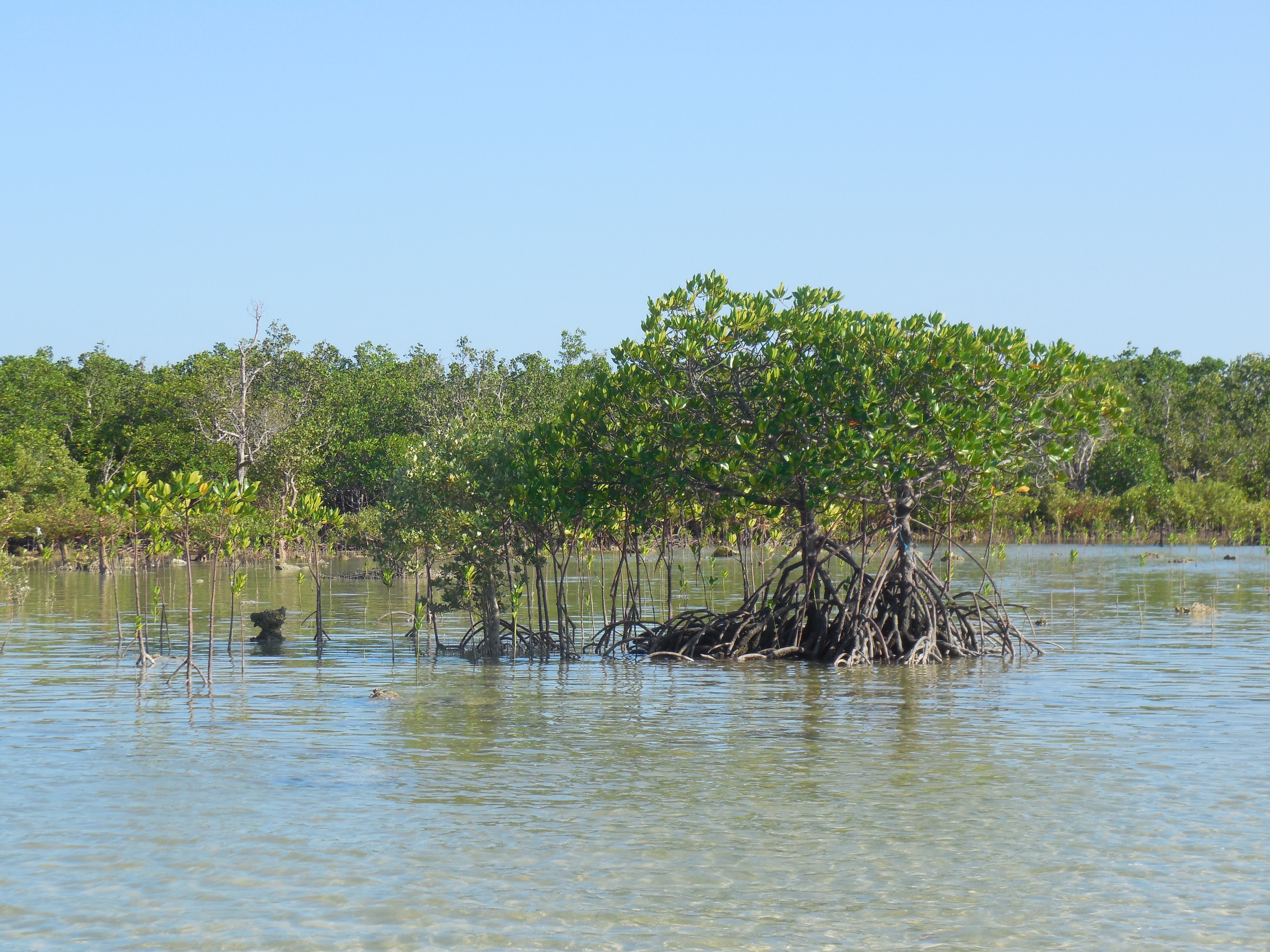
A mangrove forest on the western side of the island
