= Calauag =

Municipality in Quezon, Philippines

Calauag Kalawag (Old Tagalog)
- Municipality
- Municipality of Calauag
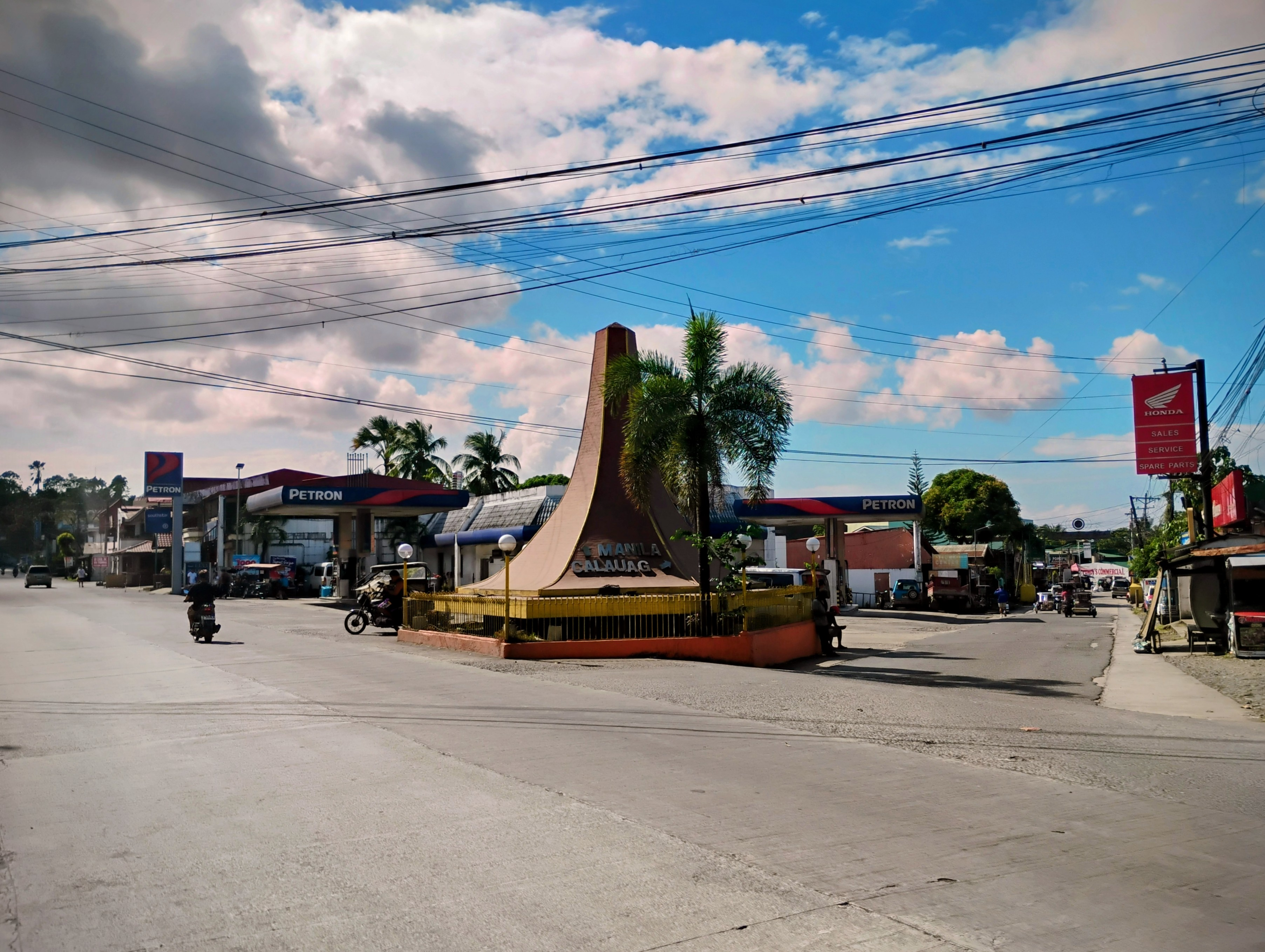
- Calauag Rotonda

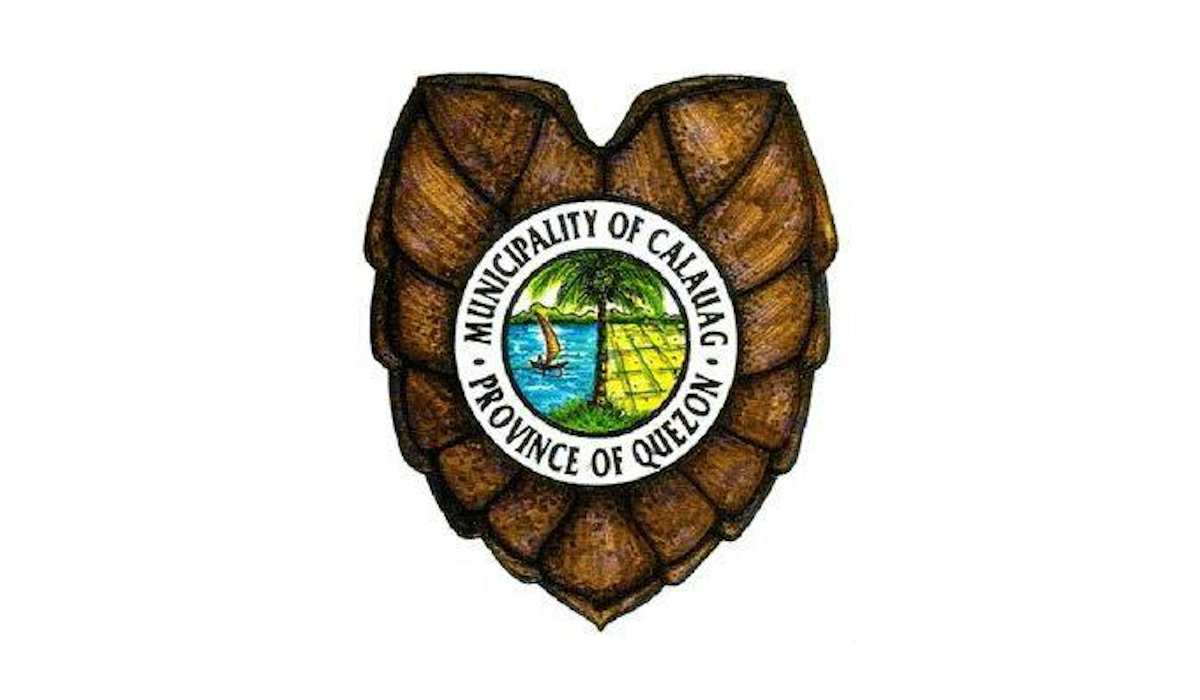
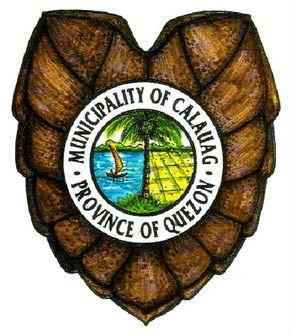
- Flag Seal
- Etymology: Tortoise
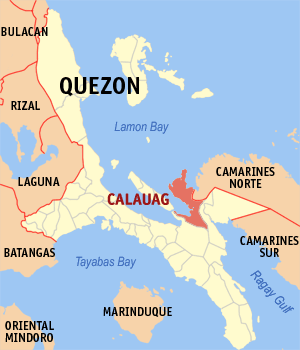
- Map of Quezon with Calauag highlighted
- Interactive map of Calauag
- Location within the Philippines
- Coordinates: 13°57′27″N 122°17′15″E
- Country: Philippines
- Region: Calabarzon
- Province: Quezon
- District: 4th district
- Founded: May 25, 1584
- Barangays: 81 (see Barangays)

Government
  - Type: Sangguniang Bayan
  - Mayor: Rosalina O. Visorde
  - Vice Mayor: Leah M. dela Cruz
  - Representative: Keith Micah Tan
  - Municipal Council: Members: Melvin J. Labasan; Razel John B. Barrera; Alfrancis V. Loria; Marina M. Umali; Cynthia R. Eduarte; Marlon T. Noscal; Frederick G. Fuenzalida; Christian Jerome G. Rosas
  - Electorate: 50,587 voters (2025)

Area
  - Total: 324.71 km^{2} (125.37 sq mi)
- Elevation: 30 m (98 ft)
- Highest elevation: 240 m (790 ft)
- Lowest elevation: 0 m (0 ft)

Population (2024 census)
  - Total: 68,999 ▲
  - Rank: 8th
  - Density: 212.49/km^{2} (550.36/sq mi)
  - Households: 18,133
- excluding 9 Barangays from East Quezon, currently occupied by Santa Elena
- Demonym(s): Calauagenian (English); Calauagin (Tagalog); Calauageño/-a (Filipino)

Economy
  - Income class: 1st municipal income class
  - Poverty incidence: 11.31% (2023)
  - Revenue: ₱ 298.8 million (2024)
  - Assets: ₱ 967.3 million (2024)
  - IRA: 156,692,905.00 (2017)
  - Expenditure: ₱ 273.7 million (2024)
  - Liabilities: ₱ 246.4 million (2024)

Utilities
  - Electricity: Quezon 1 Electric Cooperative (QUEZELCO 1)
  - Water: Calauag Water District
  - Telecommunications: (Wireless) Smart, Globe, DITO
  - Fixed line Telecommunications: PLDT, Calauag CATV System-Internet
  - Cable TV: Calauag CATV System
- Time zone: UTC+8 (PST)
- ZIP code: 4318
- PSGC: 0405607000
- IDD : area code: +63 (0)42
- Native languages: Tagalog; Manide
- Sister towns: Guinayangan; Tagkawayan; Buenavista
- Major religions: Roman Catholic, Protestantism, Islam
- Feast date: June 29
- Catholic diocese: Diocese of Gumaca
- Patron saint: Peter the Apostle; Virgin of Fatima
- Numbered highways: N1-Maharlika Highway; N68-Quirino Highway
- Website: www.calauag.gov.ph

Calauag, officially the Municipality of Calauag (Tagalog: [kaˈlaʊag]; Tagalog: Bayan ng Calauag), is a municipality in the province of Quezon, Philippines. According to the 2024 census, it has a population of 68,999 people.

== History ==
According to the writings of Valentin Martin in his "Ensayo de una sintesis de los trabajos realizados sos las corporaciones religiosas Españolas de Filipinas", the first record of the establishment of a settlement in Calauag dates as far as the year 1584. However, the formal founding of the town by Spanish conquistadors was placed in the year 1851 with the union of the settlements in Apad and Calauag.

The first elected Captain of the town was Juan Sunog. In 1897 the town was placed the Revolutionary Government and Alipio Declaro became the Municipal President. In 1914 under Municipal President Marciano Roldan, the town was destroyed by fire for the first time in its history. On December 24, 1941, the town was occupied by the Japanese Imperial Army and on January 14, 1942, the town was again destroyed by fire. On April 19, 1945, the United States and Filipino forces liberated the town from Japanese occupation. The general headquarters of the Philippine Army and Constabulary under the Commonwealth regime was built and station in Calauag during and after the war from 1945 to 1946 against the possible remaining Japanese Armies.

=== Lost barangays to Bicol ===
1918 maps

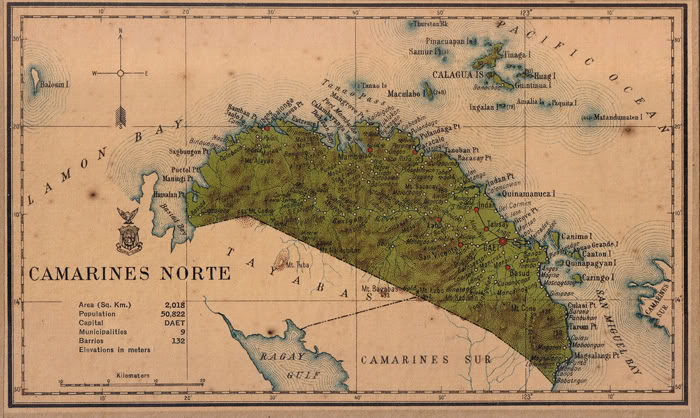
Map of Camarines Norte, which excluded the eight barangays disputed with Santa Elena, apart from Kagtalaba.

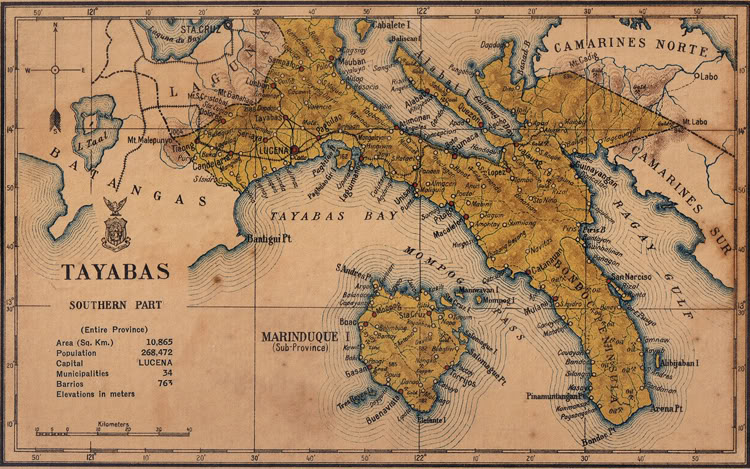
Map of southern Tayabas (now Quezon), which excluded the eight barangays disputed with Santa Elena.

Calauag experienced a big controversy due to a decade-long boundary dispute with the neighboring town of Santa Elena in the province of Camarines Norte, which resulted in a Supreme Court case, Presidential intervention, and the loss of a quarter of its land area. The disputed barangays were:

- Don Tomas
- Guitol
- Kabuluan (alternatively spelled as Cabuluan in Tayabas Tagalog)
- Kagtalaba
- Maulawin
- Plaridel (alternatively known as Macahadoc)
- Patag Ibaba
- Patag Iraya (alternatively spelled as Ilaya in Tayabas Tagalog)
- Tabugon

On October 14, 1991, the Provincial Government of Quezon and Municipal Government of Calauag ordered the demolition of a boundary marker installed by the DENR. In October 1995, then-President Fidel V. Ramos came to Calauag to meet with local officials to resolve the boundary dispute between the two provinces and surveyed the whole disputed area. Calauag retained its jurisdiction. However, the case was elevated to the Supreme Court. The Case of Province of Quezon vs. Province of Camarines Norte eventually ruled in favor of Camarines Norte and Calauag ceased its political jurisdiction on the said barangays.

== Geography ==
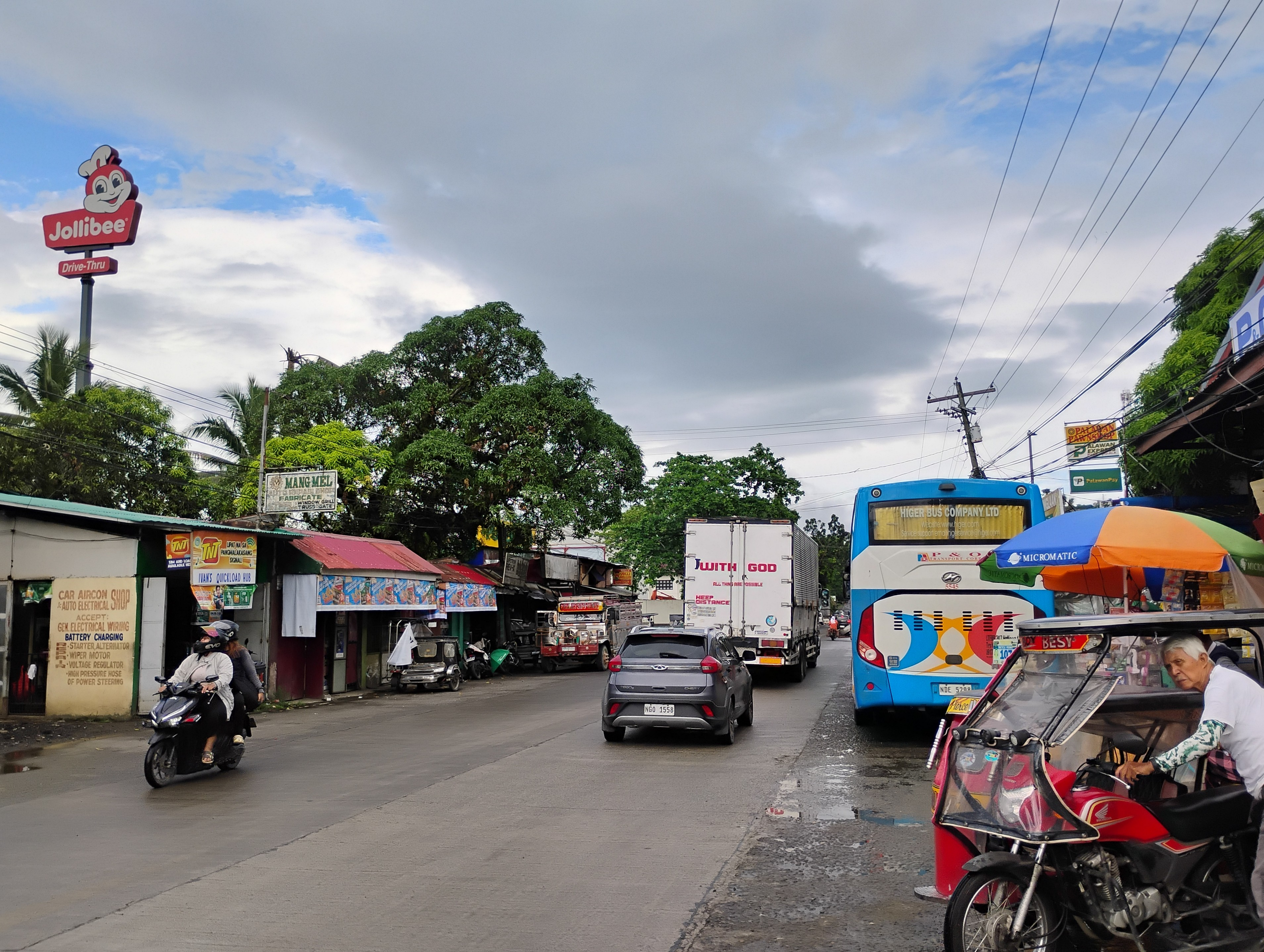
Pan-Philippine Highway traversing Calauag

Calauag is located on the north-eastern end of Tayabas Isthmus. The Daang Maharlika or Pan-Philippine Highway runs at the town after Lopez in Southbound and after Santa Elena at the Northbound or from Manila. At the north end of Quirino Highway, it meets Daang Maharlika in Barangay Tabugon. It also meets the north end of Guinayangan Provincial Road which also meets Daang Maharlika in Barangay Sumulong. It is bounded to the north-west by Calauag Bay, south-west by Lopez, to the east by Guinayangan, and to the north by Basiad Bay and Tinig Bay; it is separated from Alabat Island by a kilometer narrow straight.

Calauag is 227 kilometres (141 mi) southeast of Manila and 97 kilometres (60 mi) east from provincial capital Lucena.

=== Barangays ===
Calauag is politically subdivided into 81 barangays, as indicated below. Each barangay consists of puroks and some have sitios.

- Agoho
- Anahawan
- Anas
- Apad Lutao
- Apad Quezon
- Apad Taisan
- Atulayan
- Baclaran (Poblacion)
- Bagong Silang
- Balibago
- Bangkuruhan
- Bantolinao
- Barangay Uno (Poblacion)
- Barangay Dos (Poblacion)
- Barangay Tres (Poblacion)
- Barangay Cuatro (Poblacion)
- Barangay Cinco (Poblacion)
- Bigaan
- Binutas (Santa Brigida)
- Biyan
- Bukal
- Buli
- Dapdap
- Dominlog
- Doña Aurora
- Guinosayan
- Ipil
- Kalibo (Santa Cruz)
- Kapaluhan
- Katangtang
- Kigtan
- Kinamaligan
- Kinalin Ibaba
- Kinalin Ilaya
- Kumaludkud
- Kunalum
- Kuyaoyao
- Lagay
- Lainglaingan
- Lungib
- Mabini
- Madlangdungan
- Maglipad (Rosario)
- Maligaya
- Mambaling
- Manhulugin
- Marilag (Punaya)
- Mulay
- Pandanan
- Pansol
- Patihan
- Pinagbayanan (Poblacion)
- Pinagkamaligan (Poblacion)
- Pinagsakayan
- Pinagtalleran (Poblacion)
- Rizal Ibaba
- Rizal Ilaya
- Sabang Uno (Poblacion)
- Sabang Dos (Poblacion)
- Salvacion
- San Quintin
- San Roque Ibaba
- San Roque Ilaya
- Santa Cecilia
- Santa Maria (Poblacion)
- Santa Milagrosa
- Santa Rosa
- Santo Angel
- Santo Domingo
- Sinag
- Sumilang
- Sumulong
- Tabansak
- Talingting
- Tamis
- Tikiwan
- Tiniguiban
- Villa Magsino
- Villa San Isidro
- Viñas
- Yaganak

=== Town proper ===
The town center (poblacion) consists of 12 barangays and 11 blocks from the PNR Station in the east to Pinagkamaligan ES on the west. Going west from Barangay Pinagtalleran via Quezon Street, there are five blocks of high concentration of shops, groceries, and banks.

The Government Center is located in the south of the town which consists of Municipal Hall which houses the City Library, Fire Station, Police Station and Precinct, and the Municipal Council building. Quezon Plaza is a well-used spot for programs and events. The Livelihood Center is two blocks away from the plaza and Quezon Street. Central Park is also located in front of the plaza and the City Hall.

=== Land area ===
Calauag has a land area size of 324.71 km2 (125.37 sq mi). Its land is three times bigger than San Francisco, California 121.51 km2 (46.91 sq mi) and almost half-smaller than the size of Singapore 728.3 km2 (281.2 sq mi).

=== Climate ===
Climate data for Calauag, Quezon
Month	Jan	Feb	Mar	Apr	May	Jun	Jul	Aug	Sep	Oct	Nov	Dec	Year
Mean daily maximum °C (°F)	26 (79)	27 (81)	29 (84)	31 (88)	31 (88)	30 (86)	29 (84)	29 (84)	29 (84)	29 (84)	28 (82)	27 (81)	29 (84)
Mean daily minimum °C (°F)	22 (72)	22 (72)	22 (72)	23 (73)	24 (75)	24 (75)	24 (75)	24 (75)	24 (75)	24 (75)	24 (75)	23 (73)	23 (74)
Average precipitation mm (inches)	51 (2.0)	35 (1.4)	37 (1.5)	39 (1.5)	91 (3.6)	131 (5.2)	168 (6.6)	132 (5.2)	162 (6.4)	184 (7.2)	166 (6.5)	101 (4.0)	1,297 (51.1)
Average rainy days	13.4	10.5	11.8	12.0	19.8	24.1	26.7	25.1	25.3	23.9	21.2	17.6	231.4
Source: Meteoblue

Calauag has a tropical climate. It falls under the Type IV Tropical Climate which has rainfall is more or less evenly distributed throughout the year. Rainy season must be expected from end of May to last week of December.

== Demographics ==
Population census of Calauag
Year	Pop.	±% p.a.
1903	3,185	—
1918	6,195	+4.54%
1939	13,629	+3.83%
1948	16,875	+2.40%
1960	37,101	+6.78%
1970	49,113	+2.84%
1975	54,035	+1.93%
1980	57,907	+1.39%
1990	64,856	+1.14%
1995	60,941	−1.16%
2000	65,907	+1.69%
2007	69,475	+0.73%
2010	69,223	−0.13%
2015	73,139	+1.05%
2020	71,809	−0.39%
2024	68,999	−0.95%
Source: Philippine Statistics Authority

== Economy ==
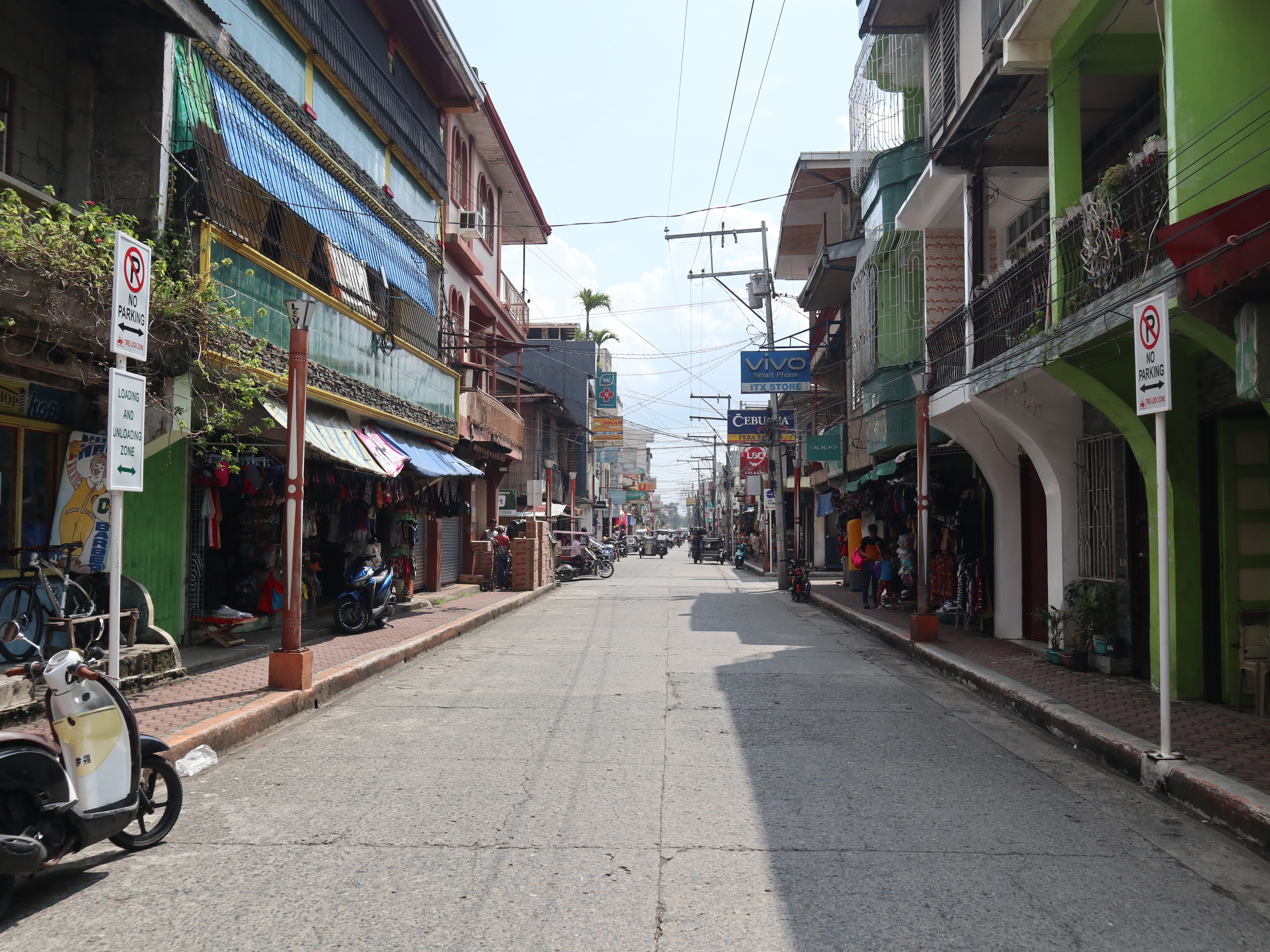
Cantre Street in Calauag poblacion

Poverty incidence of Calauag (%)

Source: Philippine Statistics Authority

Calauag has an agricultural-based economy. Most economic activity happens in the municipal market and its vicinity. Most agricultural products are coconut-based and followed by rice, corn, fish, crabs and other seafoods. It is currently classified as First class-municipality.

== Government ==
=== Local government ===
The mayor for the 2022-2025 term is Rosalina O. Visorde. Leah Dela Cruz is the town's incumbent vice mayor. Under the 1987 Constitution, the mayor is restricted to three consecutive terms with three years per term, although a mayor can be elected again after an interruption of term. The mayor has the direct control of the departments while the Municipal Administrator is indirectly in charge of all departments of the Municipal Government while the Vice Mayor is in charge of the Sangguniang Bayan (Municipal Council) which consists of seven Councilors and one Municipal Sangguniang Kabataan/SK (Youth Council) Chairman and one President of Liga ng mga Barangay (Barangay League) which are elected every three years and Municipal Administrator is appointed by the seating municipal mayor.

=== Congressional and provincial legislators ===
In the 20th Congress of House of Representatives, Calauag is represented by Keith Micah Tan under the 4th Congressional District of Quezon.

In the Provincial Board, Calauag, together with the other municipalities of 4th District of Quezon is represented by three elected board members, including Calauag native Angelo "Ola" Eduarte.

=== List of Former Chief Executives ===
#	Term	Chief Executive	Political Party	Others: (Position and origin)
Spanish Era	Term	Chief Executive	Political Party	Others: (Position and origin)
1	1851	Juan "Juan Sunog" Parcero	NA	Atimonan
2	1851	Pascual Siazon	NA	Apad
3	1852	Benito Jorbina	NA	Calauag
4	1853	Antonio Cerilla	NA	Apad
5	1854	Eustaquio Geneblazo	NA	Atimonan
6	1855	Pantaleon Cerdinia	NA	Apad
7	1856	Pedro Juaris	NA	Nueva Cáceres
8	1857	Vicente Penidles	NA	Apad
9	1858	Marciano Junillis	NA	Nueva Cáceres
10	1859	Agapito Jorbina	NA	Calauag
11	1860	Arcadio Cerilla	NA	Apad
12	1861	Felipe Labiste	NA	Libmanan
13	1862	Benito Jorbina	NA	2nd Term, Apad
14	1863–1864	Pantaleon Jorbina	NA	Apad
15	1865–1866	Domingo Jorbina	NA	Calauag
16	1867	Antonio Uransa	NA	Gumaca
17	1868	Lucas Dela Costa	NA	Mauban
18	1869–1870	Domingo Jovida	NA	Calauag
19	1871–1872	Raymundo Locido	NA	First Term, Apad
20	1873–1874	Antonio Lerum	NA	Apad
21	1875–1876	Raymundo Locido	NA	2nd Term, Apad
22	1877–1878	Canuto Escolano	NA	Apad
23	1879–1880	Juan Geneblazo	NA	Calauag
24	1881–1882	Severino Villafranca	NA	
25	1883–1886	Juan Enteria	NA	Gumaca
26	1887–1888	Sinfroso Matos	NA	Gumaca
27	1889	Raymundo Daroga	NA	Gumaca
28	1890–1891	Pedro Segui	NA	Gumaca
29	1892–1893	Sebastián Uransa	NA	Gumaca, Maura Law passed on 1893
30	1894	Antonio Lerum	NA	2nd Term, Apad
31	1895–1896	Tomás Rañola	NA	Last Capitán Municipal, Lucban
Philippine Revolution
32	1897–1899	Alipio Declaro	NA	First Municipal President. Mauban
33	1900	Juan Lerum	NA	Calauag
34	1901–1903	Hilario Cantre	NA	Cantre Street named after him in Barangay Poblacion Tres. Gumaca
35	1904–1905	Felix Jubilo	NA	Calauag
36	1906–1907	León Tañada	NA	Tañada Street named after him in Barangay Poblacion Dos. Gumaca
American Civil Government
37	1908–1909	Basilio De Guzman	NA	De Guzman Street in Barangay Poblacion Dos named after him. Gumaca
38	1910–1912	Arcadio Vera Cruz	NA	Vera Cruz Street in Barangay Poblacion Uno named after him. Atimonan
39	1913–1916	Marciano Roldan	NA	Roldan Street in Barangay Poblacion Tres named after him. Boac
40	1916–1922	Pedro Pica	NA	Atimonan
41	1922–1925	Espiridion Argüelles	NA	Arguelles Street in Barangay Poblacion Uno named after him. Calauag
42	1925–1928	Armando C. Villaverde	NA	Calauag
43	1928–1931	Donato O. Cabangon	NA	Calauag
44	1931–1934	Jacinto Lerum	NA	Calauag
Commonwealth Era
45	1934–1938	Tomás Bernabéu Morató	Nacionalista	Last Municipal President of Calauag, First Mayor of Quezon City. Morato Street in Town Proper named after him. Calauag
46	1938–1940	José Jiménez	NA	First Municipal Mayor. Calauag
Japanese-sponsored Philippines
47	1941–1947	Sisenando V. Villarubia	NA	Japanese Occupation Mayor of Calauag. Town proper raged with fire during his reign due to war. Villarubia Street in Town Proper named after him. Atimonan
Third Republic
Enactment of R.A. No. 14 which renamed the Province of Tayabas to Quezon
48	1948–1951	Arturo Morató	Liberal	Also became Mayor of Tagkawayan. Calauag
49	January–April 1952	Cirilo Pareja	NA	Atimonan
50	April 1952 – 1955	Simon Leonor	NA	Calauag
51	January 1956 – December 1959	Edgardo S. Cabangon	Liberal	First Term. Cabangon Street in Barangay Poblacion Cuatro named after him. Calauag
52	January 1960 – December 1964	Marceliano C. Parcero	NA	Calauag
Philippines under Martial Law
53	January 1965 – February 3, 1982	Edgardo S. Cabangon	Liberal	Second Term. Mayor during Marcos dictatorship. Assassinated.
53	January 1965 – February 3, 1982	Edgardo S. Cabangon	KBL	Second Term. Mayor during Marcos dictatorship. Assassinated.
54	February 4, 1982 – February 15, 1986	Julio U. Lim, M.D.	UNIDO	Removed from Office due to EDSA People Power Revolution. Calauag
People Power Revolution, Restoration of Democratic Government
55	February 16, 1986 – December 1987	Rogelio Regala	Liberal	Officer in charge. Calauag became first-class municipality. Calauag
5th Republic
56	February 2, 1988 – December 30, 1995	Julio U. Lim, M.D.	Liberal	East Quezon occupied by Camarines Norte. Camarines Norte v. Province of Quezon ruled that East Quezon belongs to Santa Elena. Second Term.
57	June 30, 1995 – June 30, 2004	Pedro C. Inofre	Independent	Calauag
58	June 30, 2004 – June 30, 2010	Eric N. Entienza	Lakas–CMD	Calauag recovered its status as first-class municipality. Calauag
59	June 30, 2010 – June 30, 2019	Luisito S. Visorde	Liberal	Incumbent. Calauag
59	June 30, 2010 – June 30, 2019	Luisito S. Visorde	NUP	Incumbent. Calauag
59	June 30, 2010 – June 30, 2019	Luisito S. Visorde	NPC	Incumbent. Calauag
60	July 1, 2019–June 30, 2025	Rosalina Visorde	NPC	Sariaya, Incumbent

== Tourism ==
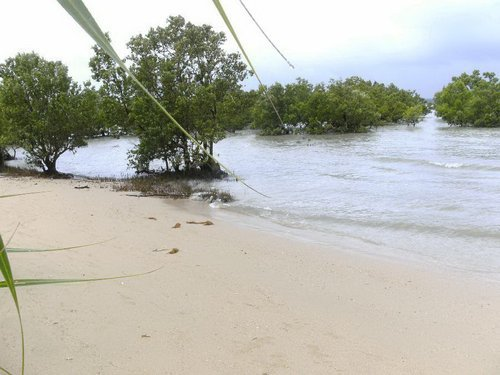
Capaluhan Beach

Some of the notable attractions are:

- Capaluhan Beach
- Pulong Pasig Sandbar
- Pangahoy Beach
- Dapdap Beach
- Santa Milagrosa Cave
- Yaganak Hanging Bridge and Calauag Watershed Forest Reserve
- Roma Point Bridge (under construction)
- Calauag Central Park (Bonifacio Monument)
- Calauag Rotonda
- Plaza Quezon
- The "C" Lighthouse
- Quezon Canal
- Calauag Municipal Library
- Sabang Playground
- Our Lady of Fatima Parish

=== Churches ===
- San Pedro Apóstol Parish (est. 1846)
- Espíritu Santo Parish (est. 2007)
- Nuestra Señora de Fátima Parish (est. 2009)
- Saint Peter the Apostle Parish Church

== Infrastructure ==
=== Transportation ===
==== Buses ====
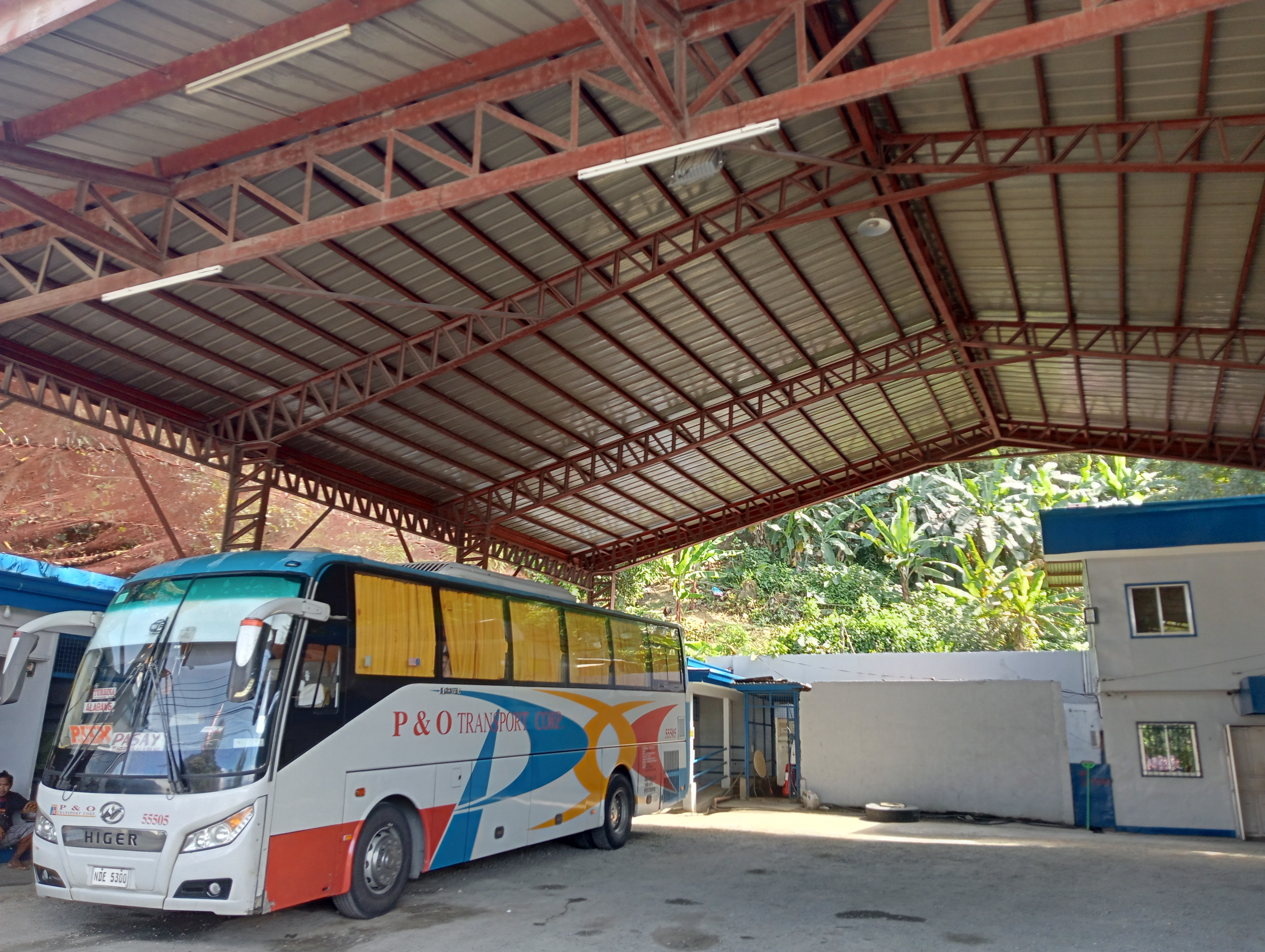
A bus terminal near Calauag Rotonda

Calauag is accessible by Bus Transportation through inter-city buses with signboards plying to Calauag and Bicol Region. Preferable bus companies plying to 4th District servicing the town are AB Liner, Barney Auto Lines, both with terminals in the town. Superlines, Daet Express and DLTBCo also unloads passenger at the town. Raymond Transportation, mostly bound for Bicol makes a short stopover at the town, being its headquarters and its historical route.

==== Railways ====
PNR Calauag Station (KM 243) is currently idle and the Intercity Service of PNR is currently defunct.

==== Roads and Waterways ====
Tourists are advised to take Tricycles as primary mode of transportation around the town. Cycling is also a common form of personal transportation in the town. Tollway nearest to Calauag is Ibaan Exit of STAR Tollway (E2). Santo Tomas Exit of STAR Tollway (E2) is preferable, as it does not require a detour to interior of Batangas. All Buses currently exits at Calamba (Turbina) Exit of the South Luzon Expressway. Calauag soon will be serviced by Toll Road 4 Mayao Exit once the toll road fully opens. Toll Road 5 and Quezon–Bicol Expressway are also planned to have exits for Calauag.

=== Utilities ===
Quezon I Electric Cooperative provides Electricity to the entire 3rd and 4th congressional districts of Quezon including barangays of Calauag lost to Bicol and Del Gallego, Camarines Sur. Calauag Water District (CWD) provides potable water to the residents of the Town Proper and nearby barangays (villages). The Yaganak-Mambaling Dam is the sole source of water for the entire municipality and operated by Calauag Water District, under license to Local Water Utilities Administration. The Local, National Direct Dial and Fiber internet are provided by PLDT which absorbed the local franchise of the former Santos Telephone Corporation. The wireless network and internet are provided by national telecommunications companies PLDT (Smart), Globe and Dito. Cable Television and alternative Cable Internet is provided by local cable operator (Calauag CATV System), albeit without High-Definition Television and national satellite television providers (Cignal, G Sat, and previously prior to lapse of congressional franchise, SkyDirect).

Liquified petroleum gas meanwhile may be purchased per cylinder tanks in gasoline stations or in local distributors. Petroleum products, such as gasoline, diesel fuel, and kerosene are imported to the municipality through local distributors of publicly listed oil companies Pilipinas Shell, Petron, and privately owned Chevron, operating under the name of Caltex, as well as independent player Uno Fuels with most stations located near the road junction of Rizal Street and locally known as Calauag rotunda and National Highway or AH1

== Education ==
There are two schools district offices which govern all educational institutions within the municipality. They oversee the management and operations of all private and public, from primary to secondary schools. These are the Calauag East Schools District Office, and Calauag West Schools District Office. Public Schools are operated by the Department of Education, through Schools Division Office of Quezon.

=== Primary and elementary schools ===
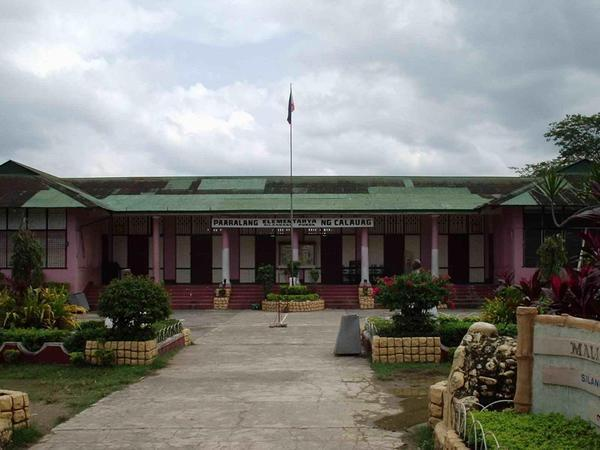
Calauag East Central Elementary School

- Calauag East Central Elementary School (K-6) on Declaro Street, between Bonifacio Street and Rizal Street
- Froebelian School of Calauag, Inc. (K–Grade 6) on Barangay Cinco
- Municipal Sector Elementary School (K-6) on Rizal Street beside the East Central Elementary School
- Pinagkamaligan Elementary School (K-6) on Rizal Street Ext.
- Sabang Elementary School (K-6) on Quezon Street Ext.
- Santa Maria Elementary School (K-6) on Rizal Street

=== Secondary schools ===
- Calauag National High School (7-12/Junior High School-Senior High School) on Maharlika Highway
- Saint Peter's School (Catholic, Parochial School) (Junior High School)

=== Higher educational institutions ===
- Calauag Central College (K-12+College level) on Rizal Street corner Arguelles Street
- Manuel S. Enverga University Foundation Calauag Inc.( Junior highschool-College Level) on Maharlika Highway Brgy. Sta Maria Calauag, Quezon
- Saint Peter's School (Catholic, Parochial School) (College level)
- South Luzon State University, Calauag Extension Campus in New Municipal Hall Complex

== Media ==
Calauag and nearby towns were being served by Radyo Natin 100.9 FM.

== Sister cities ==
Historically, the sister cities of Calauag are Guinayangan, Tagkawayan (Daughter town of Guinayangan), and Buenavista (then Piris).

== Notable personalities ==
- Alisha del Campo—Member, Philippine Women's National Football Team
- Ashtine Olviga - Actress, known for Ang Mutya ng Section E
- Eulogio Lerum – Sectoral Representative for organized labor in Philippine Congress (1978–1986), Member of the 1986 Constitutional Commission (ConCom) which drafted the 1987 Philippine Constitution
- Ice Seguerra – Host of Eat Bulaga!, guitarist, singer, roman catholic gospel musician, Former National Youth Commission chairperson
- Manoling Morato – former PCSO and Movie and Television Review and Classification Board Chairman and former TV host
- Marcelito Pomoy — Singer, Pilipinas and America's Got Talent contestant
- Mark Magsumbol, first Filipino player in 31-team American Basketball Association (ABA)
- Raymundo Punongbayan – Former director, Philippine Institute of Volcanology and Seismology
- Rey Danseco – Award winning-International Boxing Judge, journalist, TV Host, Radio Commentator
- Tomas Bernabeu Morato - 45th Local Chief Executive, Last Municipal President (Jan. 1935-December 1937) first Municipal Mayor of Calauag (Jan 1938 – Dec 1940) First Representative of the 2nd District of Tayabas

== Gallery ==
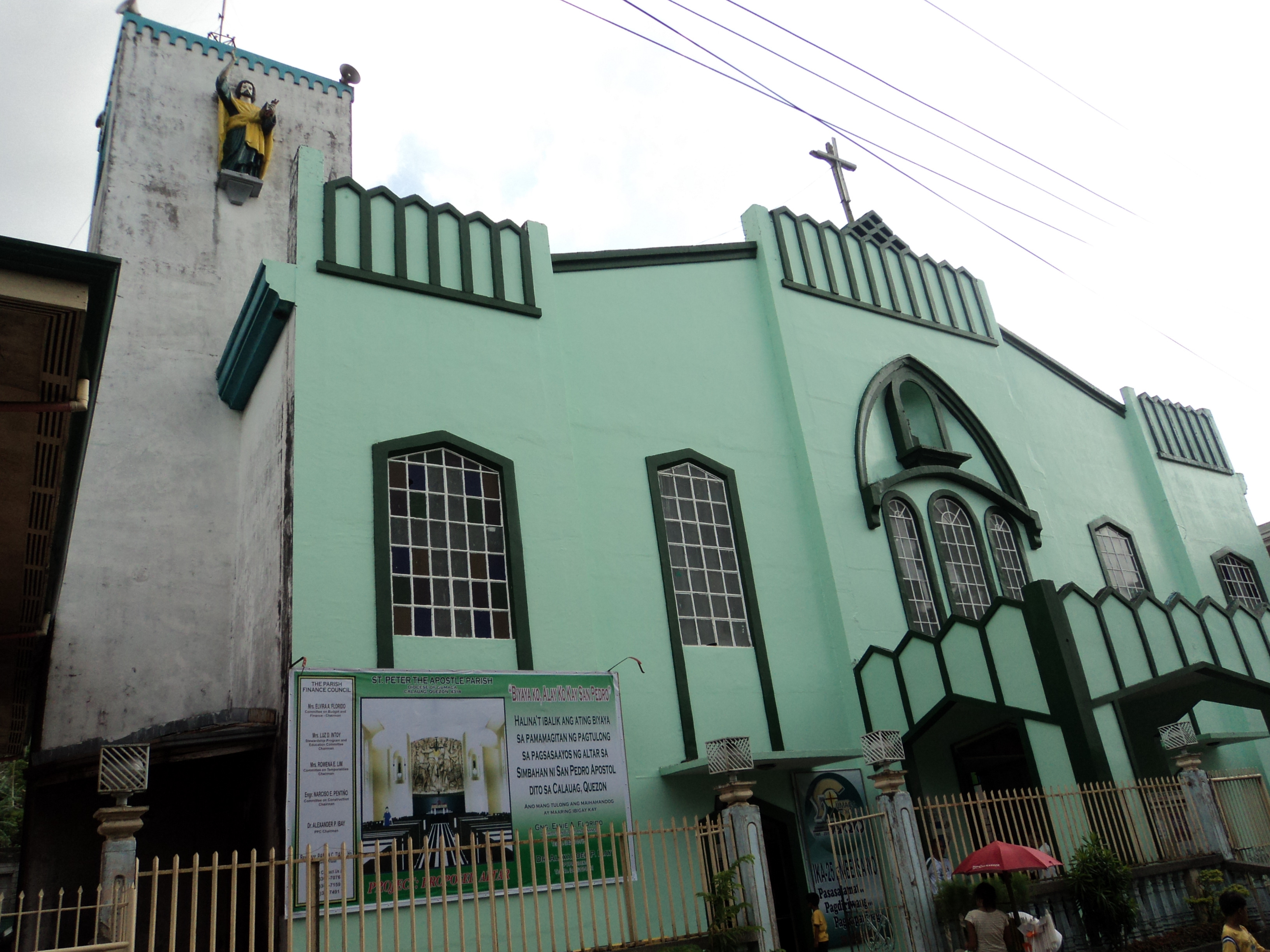
Saint Peter the Apostle Parish Church

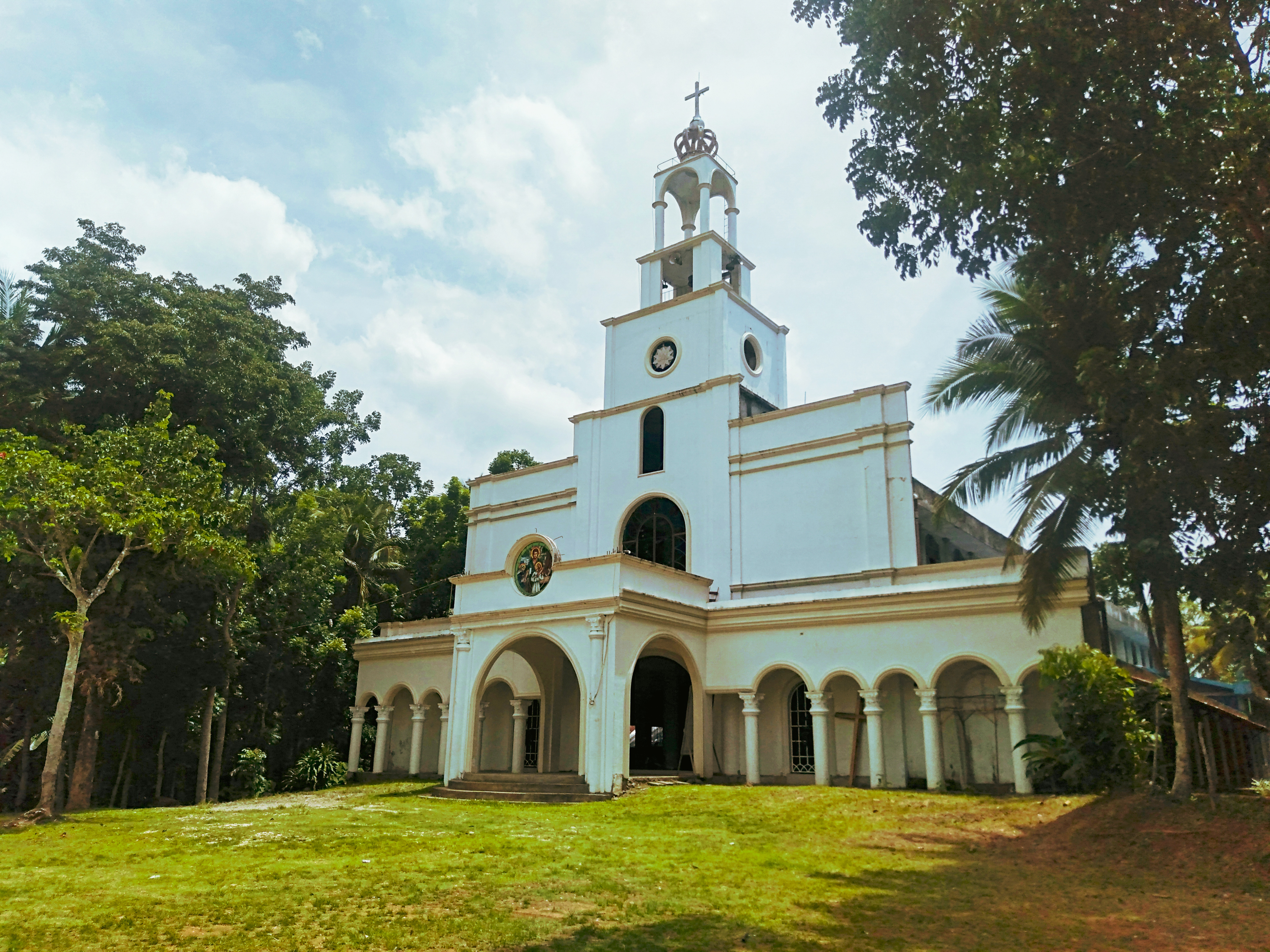
Our Lady of Fatima Church

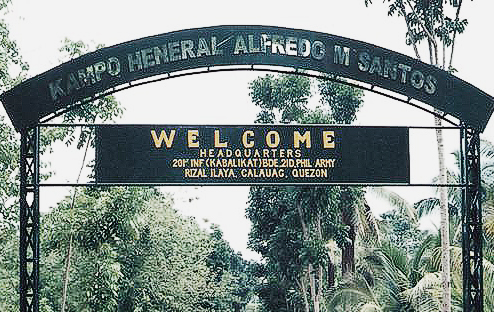
Camp Alfredo Santos in Rizal Ilaya
