= Alabat Island =

Island in Quezon province, Philippines

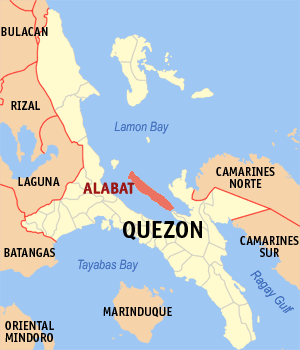
- Location within Quezon province

- Location within Philippines

Geography
- Location: Lamon Bay
- Coordinates: 14°7′4″N 122°3′6″E
- Adjacent to: Philippine Sea
- Area: 192 km^{2} (74 sq mi)
- Highest elevation: 418 m (1371 ft)
- Highest point: Mount Camagong

Administration
- Philippines
- Region: Calabarzon
- Province: Quezon
- Municipalities: Alabat; Perez; Quezon
- Largest settlement: Alabat (pop. 15,936)

Demographics
- Population: 44,589 (2020)

Additional information

Alabat Island is an island of the Philippine archipelago, in the Quezon Province of the Calabarzon region, situated just off the east coast of Southern Luzon. The island has an area of 192 square kilometres (74 sq mi) and a population of 41,822. The island has a mountain ridge with peaks ranging from 1,083 ft (330.10 m) to 1,384 ft (421.84 m) which look like islands at a distance. The highest peak is called Mt. Camagong.

Alabat Island comprises three municipalities: Perez in the northern tip, Alabat town proper in the center and Quezon in the south. The first inhabitants of the island were the indigenous Inagta Alabat people who are Negritos, the earliest settlers in the Philippines. The indigenous people spoke the Inagta Alabat language, one of the most endangered languages in the world.

The island is located in Lamon Bay and has an extensive mangrove fringe along its southwest shore, with several hundred hectares of intertidal mudflats exposed at low tide. Large portions of the original mangrove forest have been degraded or completely destroyed for the construction of fish and shrimp ponds.

Alabat enjoys a humid tropical climate with no dry season, but a very pronounced period of maximum rainfall from November to January. The island is home to the indigenous Alabat Agta people, whose language is critically endangered.

A bridge is being constructed to connect the island to Lopez, Quezon.

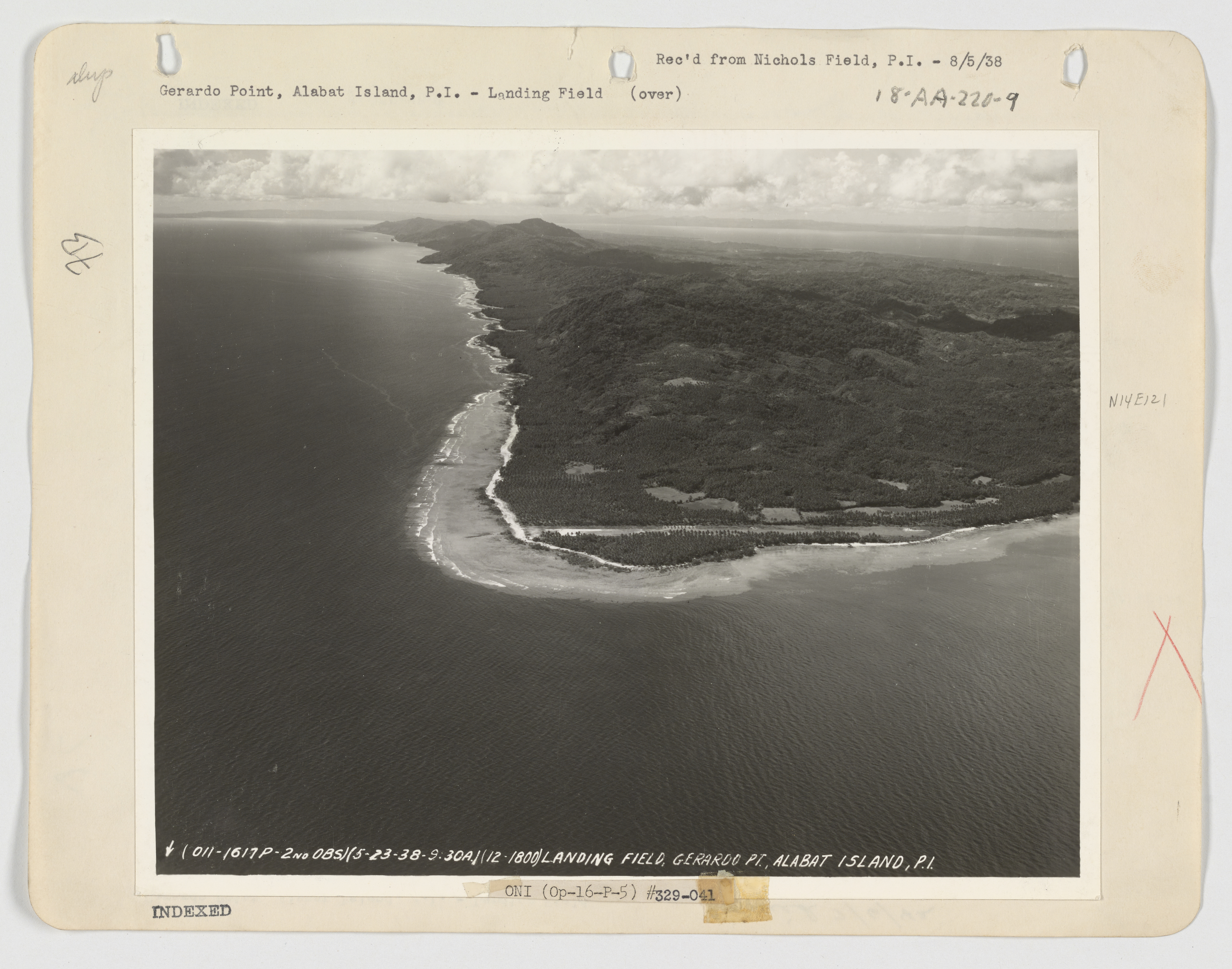
Aerial view of Gerardo Point in Alabat Island, 1938

== Inagta Alabat language ==
In 2010, UNESCO released its 3rd world volume of Endangered Languages in the World, where 3 critically endangered languages were in the Philippines. One of these languages in the Alabat Island Agta language which has an estimated speaker of 30 people in the year 2000. The language was classified as Critically Endangered, meaning the youngest speakers are grandparents and older, and they speak the language partially and infrequently and hardly pass the language to their children and grandchildren anymore. If the remaining 30 people do not pass their native language to the next generation of Alabat Agta people, their indigenous language will be extinct within a period of 1 to 2 decades.

The Alabat Agta people live only on the island of Alabat in Quezon province and a small area is Guinayangan in mainland Luzon. They are one of the original Negrito settlers in the entire Philippines. They belong to the Aeta people classification, but have distinct language and belief systems unique to their own culture and heritage.
