= Quezon, Quezon =

Municipality in Quezon, Philippines

Quezon
- Municipality
- Municipality of Quezon
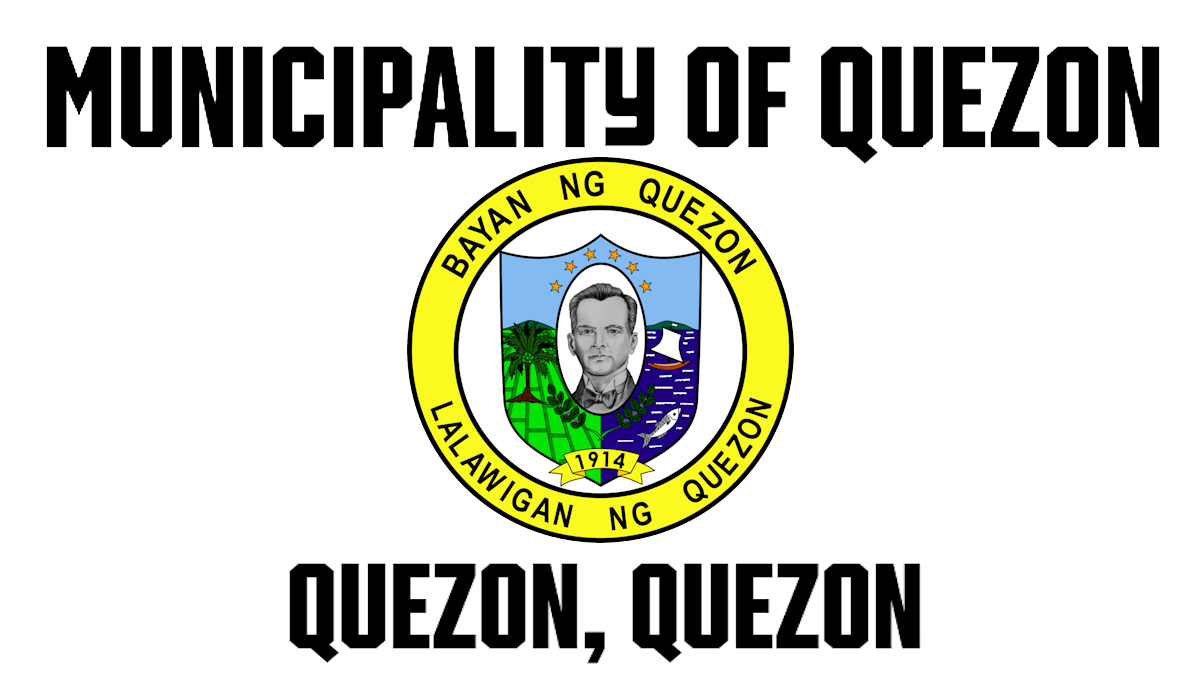
- Flag Seal

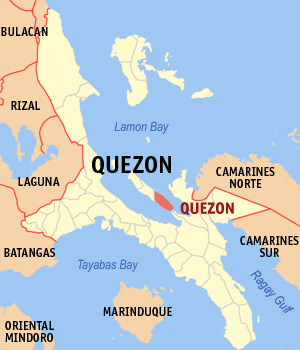
- Map of Quezon with Quezon highlighted
- Interactive map of Quezon
- Location within the Philippines
- Coordinates: 14°00′25″N 122°10′56″E
- Country: Philippines
- Region: Calabarzon
- Province: Quezon
- District: 4th district
- Founded: January 1, 1914
- Named for: Manuel Luis Quezon
- Barangays: 24 (see Barangays)

Government
  - Type: Sangguniang Bayan
  - Mayor: Juan F. Escolano
  - Vice Mayor: Pedrito L. Alibarbar
  - Representative: Keith Micah D.L. Tan
  - Municipal Council: Members: Pedrito J. Alibarbar Jr.; Zaldy B. Bayan; Maribel A. Lamadrid; Alberto L. Binocaz Jr.; Briene L. Flores; Butch A. Rodriguez; Matthew Effem S. Oliveros; Rey G. Felismena
  - Electorate: 11,698 voters (2025)

Area
  - Total: 71.22 km^{2} (27.50 sq mi)
- Elevation: 17 m (56 ft)
- Highest elevation: 151 m (495 ft)
- Lowest elevation: 0 m (0 ft)

Population (2024 census)
  - Total: 15,869
  - Density: 222.8/km^{2} (577.1/sq mi)
  - Households: 4,039
- Demonym: Quezonian

Economy
  - Income class: 4th municipal income class
  - Poverty incidence: 9.31% (2023)
  - Revenue: ₱ 110.9 million (2024)
  - Assets: ₱ 215.5 million (2024)
  - Expenditure: ₱ 118.8 million (2024)
  - Liabilities: ₱ 40.71 million (2024)

Service provider
  - Electricity: Quezon 1 Electric Cooperative (QUEZELCO 1)
- Time zone: UTC+8 (PST)
- ZIP code: 4332
- PSGC: 0405637000
- IDD : area code: +63 (0)42
- Native languages: Inagta Alabat; Tagalog

Quezon, officially the Municipality of Quezon (Tagalog: Bayan ng Quezon), is the titular municipality in the province of the same name. According to the 2024 census, it has a population of 15,869 people.

The municipality was named after Manuel L. Quezon, the second President of the Philippines and a former governor of the province. It is home to the recently started Yubakan Festival and a few speakers of the critically endangered Inagta Alabat language, one of the most endangered languages in the world as listed by UNESCO.

== History ==
Prior to the establishment of the municipality of Quezon, its area was inhabited by the Dumagat people, who primarily lived along the coast. In 1672, Franciscan friars led by Tirso de Santa Maria explored the area and established a village, which eventually grew into a place called Silangan, from the Tagalog word meaning east, signifying the direction where the sun rises. The town faced challenges, including pirate attacks, prompting the establishment of stone fortifications, including those at Gumaca.

On January 1, 1914, eleven barrios were excised from Alabat to officially form the new municipality of Quezon, by virtue of Executive Order No. 101 signed by Governor-General Francis Burton Harrison on November 29, 1913. The municipality was named after Manuel L. Quezon, the then-Resident Commissioner and a former governor and native of the province then known as Tayabas. Barrio Silanga (Silangan) was designated as the seat of municipal government.

== Geography ==
Quezon is located at the southeastern tip of Alabat Island, which is accessible to the rest of Quezon through a sea route via Gumaca and eventually the under-construction Roma Point Bridge.

=== Barangays ===
Quezon is politically subdivided into 24 barangays, as indicated below. Each barangay consists of puroks and some have sitios.

Currently, there are 6 barangays which are classified as urban (highlighted in bold).

- Apad
- Argosino
- Barangay I (Poblacion)
- Barangay II (Poblacion)
- Barangay III (Poblacion)
- Barangay IV (Poblacion)
- Barangay V (Poblacion)
- Barangay VI (Poblacion)
- Cagbalogo
- Caridad
- Cometa
- Del Pilar
- Guinhawa
- Gumubat
- Magsino
- Mascariña
- Montaña
- Sabang
- Silangan
- Tagkawa
- Villa Belen
- Villa Francia
- Villa Gomez
- Villa Mercedes

=== Climate ===
Climate data for Quezon, Quezon
Month	Jan	Feb	Mar	Apr	May	Jun	Jul	Aug	Sep	Oct	Nov	Dec	Year
Mean daily maximum °C (°F)	26 (79)	27 (81)	29 (84)	31 (88)	31 (88)	30 (86)	29 (84)	29 (84)	29 (84)	29 (84)	28 (82)	27 (81)	29 (84)
Mean daily minimum °C (°F)	22 (72)	22 (72)	22 (72)	23 (73)	24 (75)	24 (75)	24 (75)	24 (75)	24 (75)	24 (75)	24 (75)	23 (73)	23 (74)
Average precipitation mm (inches)	51 (2.0)	35 (1.4)	37 (1.5)	39 (1.5)	91 (3.6)	131 (5.2)	168 (6.6)	132 (5.2)	162 (6.4)	184 (7.2)	166 (6.5)	101 (4.0)	1,297 (51.1)
Average rainy days	13.4	10.5	11.8	12.0	19.8	24.1	26.7	25.1	25.3	23.9	21.2	17.6	231.4
Source: Meteoblue

== Demographics ==
Population census of Quezon
Year	Pop.	±% p.a.
1918	2,627	—
1939	4,450	+2.54%
1948	5,346	+2.06%
1960	8,095	+3.52%
1970	10,604	+2.73%
1975	10,465	−0.26%
1980	10,734	+0.51%
1990	11,345	+0.56%
1995	13,200	+2.88%
2000	14,594	+2.18%
2007	15,011	+0.39%
2010	15,142	+0.32%
2015	15,228	+0.11%
2020	15,886	+0.89%
2024	15,869	−0.03%
Source: Philippine Statistics Authority

== Economy ==
Poverty incidence of Quezon (%)

Source: Philippine Statistics Authority

== Churches ==
- Santa Cruz Parish (est. 1914)
- San Agustin Church
- Members Church of God International Guinhawa, Quezon, Quezon
- Quezon Presbyterian Church
- Quezon Parish Church (Mt. Carmel Parish)
- Holy Cross Parish
- Grace Reformed Baptist Outreach

== Education ==
The Quezon Schools District Office governs all educational institutions within the municipality. It oversees the management and operations of all private and public, from primary to secondary schools.

=== Primary and elementary schools ===
- Cometa Elementary School
- Del Pilar Elementary School
- Guinhawa Elementary School
- Gumubat Elementary School
- Ma. Febrer Maningas Elementary School
- Pedro Cabangon Elementary School
- Quezon Central Institute (Elementary)
- Quezon Elementary School
- R. Sasot Elementary School
- Sabang Elementary School
- Teofilo Olivera Elementary School
- Ulpiano Camacho Elementary School

=== Secondary schools ===
- Cesar C. Tan Memorial National High School
- Evaristo R. Macalintal Memorial National High School
- Josel B. Arquiza National High School
- Pablo D. Maningas National High School
- Quezon Central Institute (High School)
- Quezon National High School
- Quezon Science High School

== Notable personalities ==
- Jose Francisco Oliveros, the second Bishop of the Diocese of Boac and fourth Bishop of the Diocese of Malolos
