= Perez, Quezon =

Municipality in Quezon, Philippines

Perez Sangirin
- Municipality
- Municipality of Perez
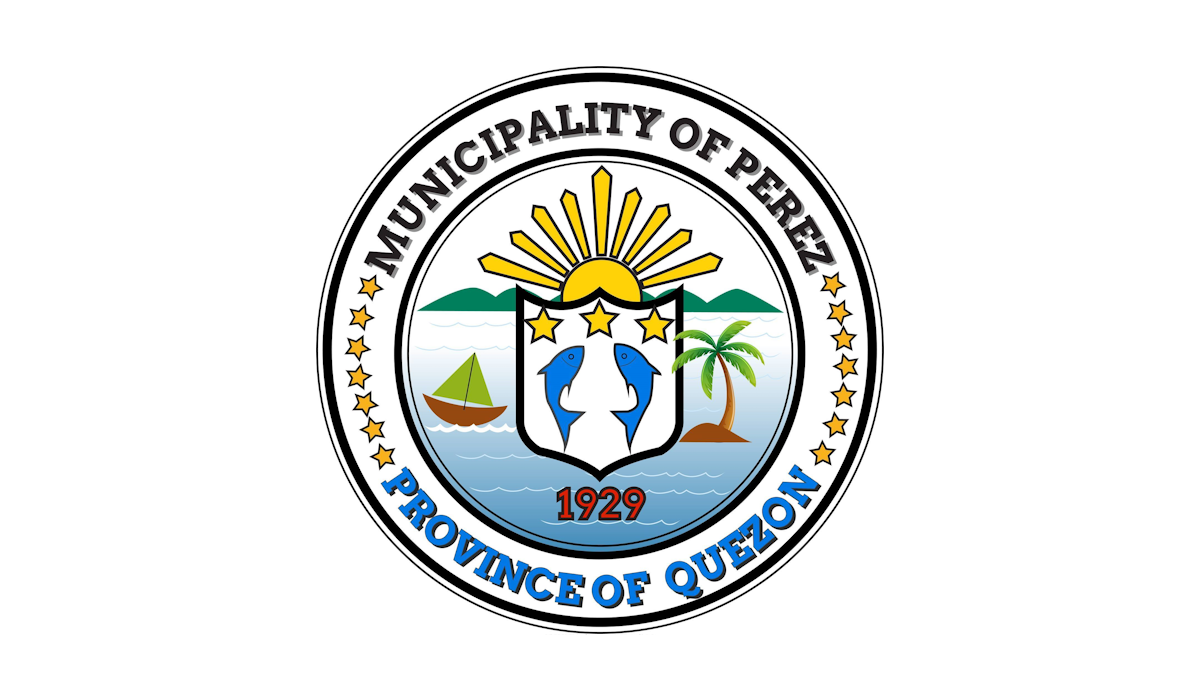
- Flag

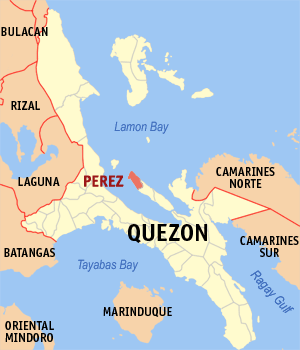
- Map of Quezon with Perez highlighted
- Interactive map of Perez
- Location within the Philippines
- Coordinates: 14°11′N 121°56′E
- Country: Philippines
- Region: Calabarzon
- Province: Quezon
- District: 4th district
- Founded: October 14, 1929
- Named for: Filemon Perez
- Barangays: 14 (see Barangays)

Government
  - Type: Sangguniang Bayan
  - Mayor: Charizze Marie Escalona
  - Vice Mayor: Ryan A. Panol
  - Representative: Keith Micah DL. Tan
  - Municipal Council: Members: John Dominic A. Corales; Aubrey Bryll M. Manlugon; Marlo B. Manaog; Andre Vivien F. Ayala; Gilbert N. Tarrega; Andrea V. Olase; Santiago T. Evangelista; Amelia O. Ramilo
  - Electorate: 10,030 voters (2025)

Area
  - Total: 57.46 km^{2} (22.19 sq mi)
- Elevation: 18 m (59 ft)
- Highest elevation: 245 m (804 ft)
- Lowest elevation: 0 m (0 ft)

Population (2024 census)
  - Total: 13,052
  - Density: 227.1/km^{2} (588.3/sq mi)
  - Households: 3,109
- Demonym: Perezian

Economy
  - Income class: 4th municipal income class
  - Poverty incidence: 10.56% (2023)
  - Revenue: ₱ 99.58 million (2024)
  - Assets: ₱ 253.6 million (2024)
  - Expenditure: ₱ 96.9 million (2024)
  - Liabilities: ₱ 38.65 million (2024)

Service provider
  - Electricity: Quezon 1 Electric Cooperative (QUEZELCO 1)
- Time zone: UTC+8 (PST)
- ZIP code: 4334
- PSGC: 0405633000
- IDD : area code: +63 (0)42
- Native languages: Inagta Alabat; Tagalog
- Website: https://perezquezon.gov.ph/

Perez, officially the Municipality of Perez (Tagalog: Bayan ng Perez), is a municipality in the province of Quezon, Philippines. According to the 2024 census, it has a population of 13,052 people.

It is home to a few speakers of the critically endangered Inagta Alabat language, one of the most endangered languages in the world as listed by UNESCO.

== History ==
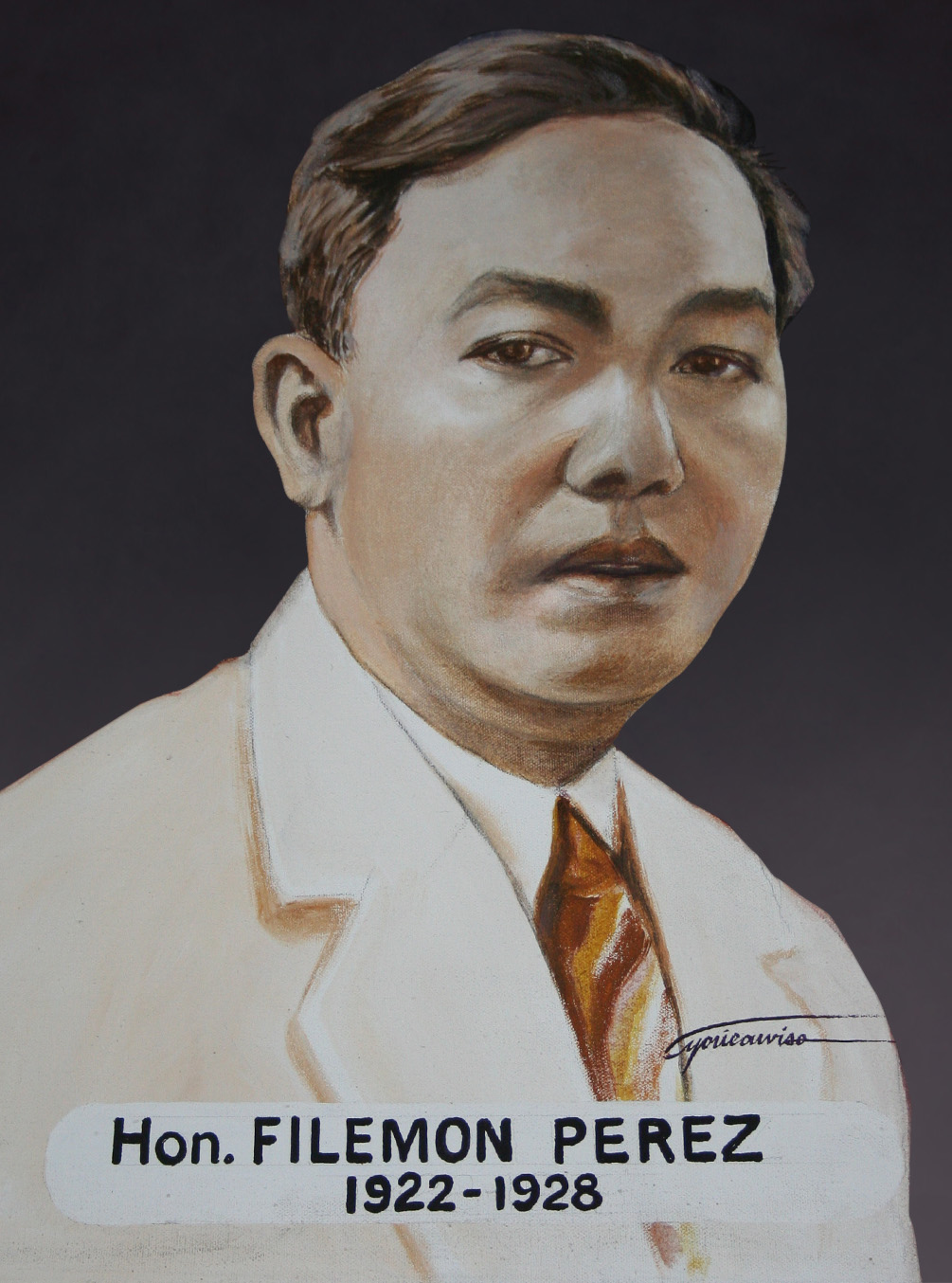
Filemon Perez, the namesake of the municipality

Perez is formerly a barrio named Sangirin, which was part of Mauban and later of Alabat in 1884. It was named as a token of gratitude to Filemon Perez, the former governor of the province then known as Tayabas who helped make this place an independent municipality in 1929.

== Geography ==
=== Barangays ===
Perez is politically subdivided into 14 barangays, as indicated below. Each barangay consists of puroks and some have sitios.

Currently, there are 4 barangays which are classified as urban (highlighted in bold).

- Maabot
- Mainit Norte
- Mainit Sur
- Pambuhan
- Pinagtubigan Este
- Pinagtubigan Weste
- Pagkakaisa Pob. (Barangay 1)
- Mapagmahal Pob. (Barangay 2)
- Bagong Pag-Asa Pob. (Barangay 3)
- Bagong Silang Pob. (Barangay 4)
- Rizal
- Sangirin
- Villamanzano Norte
- Villamanzano Sur

=== Climate ===
Climate data for Perez, Quezon
Month	Jan	Feb	Mar	Apr	May	Jun	Jul	Aug	Sep	Oct	Nov	Dec	Year
Mean daily maximum °C (°F)	26 (79)	27 (81)	29 (84)	31 (88)	31 (88)	30 (86)	29 (84)	29 (84)	29 (84)	29 (84)	28 (82)	26 (79)	29 (84)
Mean daily minimum °C (°F)	22 (72)	22 (72)	22 (72)	23 (73)	24 (75)	24 (75)	24 (75)	24 (75)	24 (75)	24 (75)	23 (73)	23 (73)	23 (74)
Average precipitation mm (inches)	83 (3.3)	55 (2.2)	44 (1.7)	37 (1.5)	90 (3.5)	123 (4.8)	145 (5.7)	125 (4.9)	135 (5.3)	166 (6.5)	163 (6.4)	152 (6.0)	1,318 (51.8)
Average rainy days	15.1	10.8	11.9	11.4	19.9	23.7	26.3	23.9	23.9	22.1	20.2	18.6	227.8
Source: Meteoblue

== Demographics ==
Population census of Perez
Year	Pop.	±% p.a.
1939	2,967	—
1948	3,507	+1.88%
1960	4,741	+2.54%
1970	5,789	+2.01%
1975	6,464	+2.24%
1980	7,551	+3.16%
1990	8,609	+1.32%
1995	10,264	+3.35%
2000	10,454	+0.39%
2007	11,022	+0.73%
2010	12,039	+3.26%
2015	12,173	+0.21%
2020	12,767	+1.01%
2024	13,052	+0.53%
Source: Philippine Statistics Authority

== Economy ==
Poverty incidence of Perez (%)

Source: Philippine Statistics Authority

== Government ==
=== Elected officials ===
Municipal council (2019-2022:

- Mayor: Pepito C. Reyes
- Vice-Mayor: Ryan A. Panol
- Councilors:
  - Gilbert N. Tarrega
  - John Dominic A. Corales
  - Roberto R. Buerano
  - Richard R. Mascarina
  - Santiago T. Evangelista
  - Victor C. Alpay
  - Aubrey B. Manlogon
  - Czarina C. Caringal

== Churches ==
- San Antonio de Padua Parish (est.1964)

== Education ==
The Perez Schools District Office governs all educational institutions within the municipality. It oversees the management and operations of all private and public, from primary to secondary schools.

=== Primary and elementary schools ===
- Mainit Norte Elementary School
- Pambuhan Elementary School
- Perez Central School
- Perez West Elementary School
- Pinagtubigan Elementary School
- Rizal-Maabot Elementary School

=== Secondary schools ===
- Perez National High School
- Severo Tejada Integrated School
