= Alabat, Quezon =

Municipality in Quezon, Philippines

Alabat
- Municipality
- Municipality of Alabat
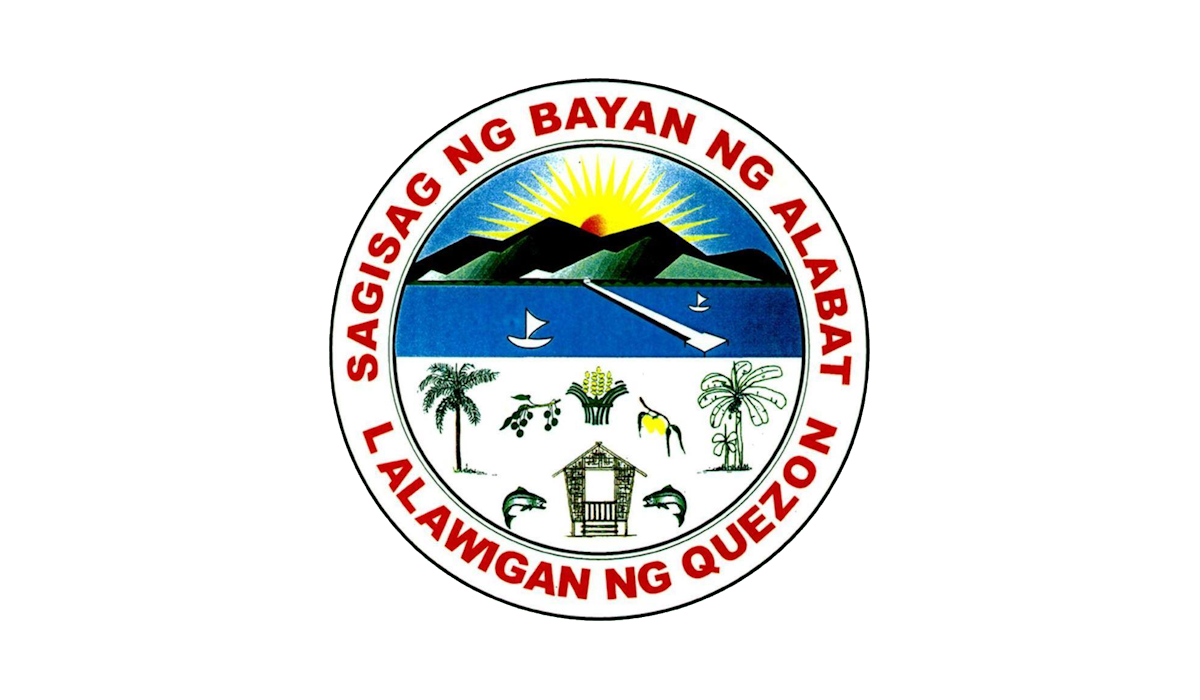
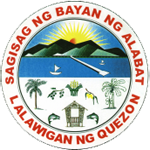
- Flag Seal
- Nicknames: "The Hidden Gem of Quezon"; "Gateway Municipality to the Pacific"; "Alabat: The Hidden Paradise"
- Motto: Mapayapa, Maunlad, Maganda at Masayang Bayan ng Alabat
- Interactive map of Alabat
- Location within the Philippines
- Coordinates: 14°06′08″N 122°00′49″E
- Country: Philippines
- Region: Calabarzon
- Province: Quezon
- District: 4th district
- Founded: 1882
- Conversion as Municipality: 1900
- Barangays: 19 (see Barangays)

Government
  - Type: Sangguniang Bayan
  - Mayor: Hon. Eizelle "AYS" M. Avellano-Canimo, Ph.D(c), MBA
  - Vice Mayor: Hon. Hilda M. Ursolino.
  - Representative: Keith Micah DL. Tan
  - Municipal Council: Members: Eldin Fren A. Canimo; Deric Alvarez; Richard Lopez; Jayson D. Pascuhin; Marriz Verzo; Hubert B. Ursolino; Khem Wenbert Hervera; Tata Cabrera
  - Electorate: 12,023 voters (2025)

Area
  - Total: 57.61 km^{2} (22.24 sq mi)
- Elevation: 29 m (95 ft)
- Highest elevation: 418 m (1,371 ft)
- Lowest elevation: 0 m (0 ft)

Population (2024 census)
  - Total: 15,744
  - Density: 273.3/km^{2} (707.8/sq mi)
  - Households: 3,988
- Demonym: Alabatin

Economy
  - Income class: 4th municipal income class
  - Poverty incidence: 9.29% (2023)
  - Revenue: ₱ 123.1 million (2024)
  - Assets: ₱ 221.9 million (2024)
  - Expenditure: ₱ 122.3 million (2024)
  - Liabilities: ₱ 26.33 million (2024)

Service provider
  - Electricity: Quezon 1 Electric Cooperative (QUEZELCO 1)
- Time zone: UTC+8 (PST)
- ZIP code: 4333
- PSGC: 0405602000
- IDD : area code: +63 (0)42
- Native languages: Inagta Alabat (Ayta Kadi); Tagalog
- Major religions: Roman Catholic
- Website: www.alabat.gov.ph

Alabat, officially the Municipality of Alabat (Tagalog: Bayan ng Alabat), is a municipality in the province of Quezon, Philippines. According to the 2024 census, it has a population of 15,744 people.

The town is home to a few speakers of the critically endangered Inagta Alabat language, one of the most endangered languages in the world as listed by UNESCO.

It is founded in the year 1882 by a Spanish priest from Gumaca and built an ermita that honours Our Lady of Monte Carmelo. Its first name was Gordo, which means "fat", due to the island's shape. It was change to Gordon, Barcelona, and later on Alabat. The formal establishment of the town is in the year of 1900.

== Etymology ==
Before Spanish colonization, the mountains were already inhabited by the “Baluga” (aborigines). Nomadic by nature, they would clean patches of land, plant rice and vegetables and hunt. After harvest, they would migrate to another part of the forest and repeat the cycle. The elder of the community was their leader and adviser. During drought, they made temporary houses near the shore and used fishing as their primary means of livelihood.

Local folklore says that a Spanish priest from the mainland saw the Island from across Lamon Bay. He was curious as to what lay in that island and its inhabitants. The Spanish priest crossed the bay on the boat and founded a church at what is today barangay Gordon. The church today is underwater, but the cross can still be seen.

The name Alabat which has been used as it is now, came from the word Alâbât (local Tagalog word for balustrade or balcony). The early inhabitants of this place made balustrades across their doors to prevent small children from walking out of the house or falling from the stairwells.

Local history says that a platoon of American soldiers came to Lupac after the Philippine independence to conduct a survey. They entered a native's hut and asked the person what the name of the place was. The owner of the house at that time was holding the balustrade that he was making. Unable to understand the English language, he thought they were asking what he was doing so the native replied alâbât! The leader took his diary and wrote the word "Alabat" without any accent.

Another local folklore says that the name 'Alabat' was from Muslim origins where Alabat comes from Allah-bat, and if the word is mixed up actually means bat-ala or bathala which is the local word for god.

== History ==
The first inhabitants of the town were the indigenous Inagta Alabat people who are Negritos, the earliest settlers in the Philippines. The indigenous people spoke the Inagta Alabat language, one of the most endangered languages in the world.

During the Spanish colonial period, Alabat was inhabited by the family of Caparros because of its safe landing shore and overflowing natural resources. Other immigrants from Gumaca came pouring in upon hearing the suitability of this place from human habitation. They named the place "Camagong". Perhaps this name was taken from trees (Diospyros blancoi) which bore edible fruits called Camagong or Mabulo which grow abundantly in Camagong Mountain, the highest mountain in Alabat Island.

It was said that Rev. Father Jesus, in charge of the parish of Gumaca possessed a telescope. Almost every time he looked through his telescope to see whether Moro Vintas were coming. He reached out a focus on the sandy shore of Ilangin, the present sitio of the barrio of Gordon. It came to his mind that an Ermita should be built in that place. So he summoned the leaders of the settlers to congregate and encouraged them to settle at Ilangin in order to make a visita and build an Ermita in the year 1882.

The growth was so abrupt that a village sprang. Father Jesus called this village "Gordo" (meaning fat) and afterwards he named it Gordon in memory of his town in Spain.

Then came Don Pedro Pica and his brother Don Nicolas, who wanted to establish a home in Gorden. Upon reaching the place they found out that anchorage was difficult on account of the shallow coral reefs and absence of navigable river. Inquiries were made among the villagers and Don Pedro learned the suitability of Lupac, the present site of Alabat. He ordered Francisco Mercado, Modesto Arcaya, Casimero Caparros, Luciano Caparros, Cayetano Caparros, Pedro Caparros, Juan Caparros, Venancio Mascariña, Valentin Lisardo, Camilo Febrer, Antonio Montañez, Mariano Silva, Eusebio Baranta, Cayetano Olivares, Jose Canata and many others to clean a site in Lupac for a new village.

When Rev. Father Jesus heard about this act of Don Pedro Pica, he was neatly infuriated. He accused these two men and by the order of Capitang Totoy of Gumaca, they were taken to prison until Don Pedro Pica secured freedom from the gobernadorcillos of Tayabas. The Gobernadorcillo also pardoned his brother Don Nicolas Pica the following year. The interest of these two brothers in Lupac did not fade away so they returned to the place and established a lumber industry. The Gobernadorcillo learned of their success in their industry and their able leadership to settlers of the place so Don Pedro, the elder, gained influence from the Gobernadorcillo and was appointed sub-Captain of Lupac under Capitan Totoy of Gumaca. Through the order of Father Jesus, Don Pedro Pica changed the name Lupac to Barcelona in memory of the beautiful coastal town in Spain.

When the American Expeditionary forces occupied Tayabas Province and appointed Carpenter as Military Governor, the name Barcelona was changed to Alabat.

=== Townhood ===
According to the Republic Act No. 956, Alabat was founded on October 23, 1903. Meanwhile, the legal basis of creation is May 15, 1900.

The separation of Silangan (now Quezon, Quezon) as an independent municipality was declared in 1914. This municipality was named in honor of President Manuel L. Quezon. In 1929, the inhabitants of Sangirin (now Perez) clamored also for separation from Alabat. By the end of the same year, Sangirin was granted freedom and became an independent municipality named in honor of then Felimon Perez, who was the Governor of the Province.

Today, Alabat island is composed of 3 towns, Perez in the northern tip, Alabat town proper at the center and Quezon in the south. The town of Alabat saw new development in the early 21st century: a modern port was built to replace the old one, more paved roads are being constructed, telephone service, cellphone sites, wireless internet and local government projects to improve the lives of Alabateños.

Alabat, Quezon has been featured several times in various television programs in the country such as Tapatan Ni Tunying, Kapuso Mo, Jessica Soho, Motorcycle Diaries and more, because of its natural beauty. In an article published in Inquirer and written by Lester Villegas, Alabat was dubbed as the "Hidden Paradise of Quezon Province".

== Geography ==
Located centrally on the eponymous Alabat Island, it is between the Pacific Ocean and Lamon Bay.

=== Barangays ===
Alabat is politically subdivided into 19 barangays - as indicated below - 5 of which are urban and 14 rural. Each barangay consists of puroks and some have sitios.

- Angeles
- Bacong
- Balungay
- Buenavista
- Caglate
- Camagong
- Gordon
- Pambilan Norte
- Pambilan Sur
- Barangay 1 (Poblacion)
- Barangay 2 (Poblacion)
- Barangay 3 (Poblacion)
- Barangay 4 (Poblacion)
- Barangay 5 (Poblacion)
- Villa Esperanza
- Villa Jesus Este
- Villa Jesus Weste
- Villa Norte
- Villa Victoria

=== Climate ===
Climate data for Alabat, Philippines (1991–2020, extremes 1962–2020)
Month	Jan	Feb	Mar	Apr	May	Jun	Jul	Aug	Sep	Oct	Nov	Dec	Year
Record high °C (°F)	34.4 (93.9)	33.4 (92.1)	35.6 (96.1)	36.4 (97.5)	37.8 (100.0)	37.0 (98.6)	36.1 (97.0)	37.2 (99.0)	36.2 (97.2)	35.1 (95.2)	35.0 (95.0)	34.0 (93.2)	37.8 (100.0)
Mean daily maximum °C (°F)	28.4 (83.1)	28.8 (83.8)	30.0 (86.0)	31.8 (89.2)	32.8 (91.0)	32.7 (90.9)	31.8 (89.2)	32.0 (89.6)	31.7 (89.1)	30.7 (87.3)	29.9 (85.8)	28.7 (83.7)	30.8 (87.4)
Daily mean °C (°F)	25.3 (77.5)	25.5 (77.9)	26.4 (79.5)	27.7 (81.9)	28.3 (82.9)	28.3 (82.9)	27.7 (81.9)	27.8 (82.0)	27.6 (81.7)	27.1 (80.8)	26.6 (79.9)	25.8 (78.4)	27.0 (80.6)
Mean daily minimum °C (°F)	22.2 (72.0)	22.2 (72.0)	22.8 (73.0)	23.6 (74.5)	23.9 (75.0)	23.9 (75.0)	23.6 (74.5)	23.6 (74.5)	23.5 (74.3)	23.4 (74.1)	23.4 (74.1)	22.8 (73.0)	23.2 (73.8)
Record low °C (°F)	17.1 (62.8)	17.0 (62.6)	17.8 (64.0)	18.9 (66.0)	20.0 (68.0)	21.0 (69.8)	19.0 (66.2)	20.0 (68.0)	20.7 (69.3)	19.8 (67.6)	18.0 (64.4)	18.0 (64.4)	17.0 (62.6)
Average rainfall mm (inches)	249.0 (9.80)	192.7 (7.59)	146.9 (5.78)	84.3 (3.32)	128.2 (5.05)	175.4 (6.91)	229.5 (9.04)	144.4 (5.69)	266.9 (10.51)	456.5 (17.97)	567.0 (22.32)	722.1 (28.43)	3,362.9 (132.40)
Average rainy days (≥ 1.0 mm)	18	13	9	6	9	11	15	12	15	21	23	23	175
Average relative humidity (%)	85	85	84	82	81	82	83	82	84	84	85	86	84
Source: PAGASA

Alabat experiences tropical rainforest climate (Af) as rainfall in all months exceeds 60 mm (2 in). There is a significant difference between the driest and the wettest month whereas the driest month is April with rainfall total 84.3 mm (3 in), while the wettest month is December with rainfall total 722.1 mm (28 in). The rainfall seems increased significantly in October. The mean temperature throughout the year is ranging from the coolest month with average of 25.3 °C (78 °F) of January to the hottest month with average of 28.7 °C (84 °F) on May.

== Demographics ==
Population census of Alabat
Year	Pop.	±% p.a.
1903	4,516	—
1918	4,567	+0.07%
1939	4,306	−0.28%
1948	5,607	+2.98%
1960	8,529	+3.56%
1970	9,830	+1.43%
1975	10,939	+2.17%
1980	11,385	+0.80%
1990	11,785	+0.35%
1995	13,787	+2.98%
2000	14,204	+0.64%
2007	14,789	+0.56%
2010	16,120	+3.19%
2015	15,630	−0.59%
2020	15,936	+0.41%
2024	15,744	−0.29%
Source: Philippine Statistics Authority

=== Alabat Island Agta Language ===
In 2010, UNESCO released its 3rd world volume of Endangered Languages in the World, where 3 critically endangered languages were in the Philippines. One of these languages in the Alabat Island Agta language which has an estimated speaker of 30 people in the year 2000. The language was classified as "critically endangered". If the remaining 30 people do not pass their native language to the next generation of Alabat Agta people, their indigenous language will be extinct within a period of 1 to 2 decades.

The Alabat Agta people live only on the island of Alabat in Quezon province. They are one of the original Negrito settlers in the entire Philippines. They belong to the Aeta people classification, but have distinct language and belief systems unique to their own culture and heritage.

The Inagta Alabat language has similarities with other Philippine languages over which it has 16 consonants and four vowels. It also has adverbial particles which add different meanings to a given clause similar to other Philippine languages. Here are some of the sample words and phrases from the language:

- nu he-sâ dû a degéw - "the day before yesterday"
- nu he-sâ dû a línggu - "last week"
- káun - "eat"
- kaúnen - "to eat"
- beét - "carry on one's back"
- telbéd - "lie on side"

Below is a sample text along with English translation by Rosie Susutin Barreno of the Inagta Alabat text Hu he-new pat hu degew or "The Wind and the Sun":

He-sâ a degéw, igtatálu hu hé-new pat hu degéw. Nagkádè hu hé-new, "Ha-kú hu malakas dekitâ a dawhá." Nagtubág hu degéw, "Ukún!"...

One day, the wind and the sun were arguing. The wind said, "I am the stronger of the two of us." The sun answered, "No!"...

Rosie Susutin Barreno, born in 1967, was the Alabat Agta chieftain until 2014. She was also an author having published the story of "The Wind and the Sun" into English and created an unpublished Tagalog version of the story.

== Economy ==
Poverty incidence of Alabat (%)

Source: Philippine Statistics Authority

Economic activities in Alabat are heavily concentrated in the poblacion and other sub-urban barangays. Improved road network provides access from all towns in the island of Alabat to this partially urbanized town. Well-paved radial routes criss-crossing in and out of the town facilitate the transport of unlimited assortment of merchandise, supplies, and raw materials to and from the town on a round-the-clock basis. The major crops of the town are rice, coconut and calamansi.

=== Port of Alabat ===
Alabat is considered one of the most important commercial and trading point in the island and in the whole Lamon Bay Area. It has a rich fishing ground which supplies fish and other seafoods to neighboring towns. The Port of Alabat is considered one of the longest port in the province.

=== Agriculture ===
- Total Number of Fishermen and farmers- 3000 (estimate)
- Area of Irrigated Lands- 150 hectares (unofficial)

== Culture ==
=== Events and festivals ===
- Santo Niño Festival - (3rd Sunday of January)
- Coconut Festival - May 15
- Alabat founding Anniversary - May 15
- Flores De Mayo - (Last Sunday of May)
- Feast of Our Lady of Mt. Carmel (Town Fiesta) - July 16

=== Churches ===
- Nuestra Señora del Monte Carmelo Parish - Poblacion (est.1882)

== Government ==
=== Elected officials ===
Municipal council (2019-2022):

- Mayor: Fernando L. Mesa
- Vice Mayor: Raul U. Declaro
- Councilors:
  - Jorge Roito N. Hirang Jr.
  - Khem Wenbert M. Hervera
  - Hubert B. Ursolino
  - Ireneo R. Layosa Jr.
  - Lidio S. Española
  - Patricio L. Sasis Jr.
  - Dante M. Surreda
  - Florante B. Bantoc
- Perlito L. Sasis - PPLB
- Marriz M. Verzo- PPSK

== Infrastructure ==
=== Transportation ===
Alabat is accessible by land where tricycles are administered by Alabat Tricycle Operators and Drivers Association (ALTODA) and jeepneys travelling in and out of the town; and water transportation via Atimonan-Alabat Route through the Alabat Feeder Port.

=== Communication ===
Alabat is served by a landline company like SANTELCOR, while the wireless phones and internet are provided by national communications companies Smart, Globe and Sun Cellular and a postal service is served by PHILPost.

=== Utilities ===
The Alabat Cable TV System operates and covers most of the town while Quezon I Electric Cooperative provides Electricity to Alabat and nearby-towns. Alabat Municipal Waterworks System provide the waterworks.

==== Alabat wind power project ====
In April 2024, Alternergy Holdings Corp. received a 5.3-billion Php loan from Rizal Commercial Banking Corp. (RCBC) for its wind project in Quezon province. The company also received financing from the Alabat Wind Power Corp. (AWTC), which supported the construction of a 64-megawatt Alabat Wind Power Project in Alabat Island.

=== Healthcare ===
Alabat has a public hospital, the Alabat Island District Hospital, which provide healthcare services in the municipality.

== Education ==
The Alabat Schools District Office governs all educational institutions within the municipality. It oversees the management and operations of all private and public, from primary to secondary schools.

Alabat has one tertiary school and numerous secondary and primary schools, including public and private. Southern Luzon State University- Alabat Campus - the only university in the island offers degree programs including education, information technology and fisheries.

Aside from tertiary school, the town also has pre-school, primary and secondary levels of education, both in private and public schools. There are numerous day-care centers found all over the town.

The Island Concept Dancers was founded in 2016, plays an important role on shaping the dance and performing arts scene of the municipality.

=== Primary and elementary schools ===
- Alabat Central Elementary School
- Angeles-Caglate Elementary School
- C.B. Encarnado Elementary School
- Liwanag United Methodist Christian School
- Mater Carmelli Catholic School
- Pambilan Elementary School
- R.T. Camacho Elementary School

=== Secondary schools ===
- Alabat Island National High School
- Angeles Caglate Integrated School
- RT Camacho Integrated School

=== Higher educational institution ===
- Southern Luzon State University

== Sister cities ==
- (Philippines) Makati City
- (Philippines) Valenzuela City
