= Southern Tagalog =

Former administrative region of the Philippines

Southern Tagalog Timog Katagalugan
- Former region of the Philippines
- 1965–2002
- Location within the Philippines
- Capital: Quezon City (Regional center)
- Population
  - 2000: 11,793,655
- History
  - Established: 1 January 1965
  - Disestablished: 17 May 2002
- Political subdivisions: 11 provinces at the time of partitioning: Aurora; Batangas; Cavite; Laguna; Marinduque; Occidental Mindoro; Oriental Mindoro; Palawan; Quezon; Rizal; Romblon
Succeeded by
Calabarzon; Mimaropa
- Today part of: Central Luzon; Calabarzon; Metro Manila; Mimaropa

Southern Tagalog (Filipino: Timog Katagalugan), designated as Region IV, (Note: and briefly as Region IV-A, when it became a sub-region of Metro Manila) was an administrative region in the Philippines that comprised the current regions of Calabarzon and Mimaropa, the province of Aurora in Central Luzon, and most of the National Capital Region. It was the largest region in the Philippines in terms of both land area and population. After its partition on May 17, 2002, Southern Tagalog continues to exist as a cultural-geographical region.

The region was and is still bordered by Manila Bay and the South China Sea to the west, Lamon Bay and the Bicol Region to the east, the Tayabas Bay, Sibuyan Sea, and Balabac Strait, where it shared a maritime border with Sabah, Malaysia, to the south, and Central Luzon to the north; it was bordered by Cagayan Valley to the north geographically.

== History ==
Southern Tagalog was the largest region in the Philippines in terms of both land area and population. The 2000 Census of Population and Housing showed the region having a total of 11,793,655 people, which comprised 15.42 percent of the 76.5 million population of the country at that time. The former region covered the area where many reside; the two other majority-Tagalophone regions are the National Capital Region and Central Luzon.

Quezon City was the designated regional center of Southern Tagalog, but Lucena was the former Government Center of Southern Tagalog, and is still host to most of the branches of governmental agencies, businesses, banks, and service facilities in the region.

On September 7, 1946, Republic Act No. 14 changed the name of the province of Tayabas to Quezon; both Quezon City & Quezon province were named in honor of Manuel L. Quezon, the Commonwealth president who was born in Baler, which was one of the province's towns.

In June 1951, the northern area of Quezon (specifically, the towns of Baler, Casiguran, Dilasag, Dingalan, Dinalungan, Dipaculao, Maria Aurora and San Luis) was made into the sub-province of Aurora; during that time, only Baler, Casiguran, Dipaculao, and Maria Aurora existed yet, wherein the 2 latter towns were separated from Baler. Aurora was named of the president's wife, Aurora Quezon, also a native of Baler. One obvious reason for creating the sub-province was the area's isolation from the rest of Quezon Province: there were no direct links to the rest of the province and much of the terrain was mountainous and heavily forested, which made the area relatively isolated, and its distance from Quezon's capital Lucena. Aurora was finally separated from Quezon as an independent province in 1979, and added to Southern Tagalog.

On November 7, 1975, through Presidential Decree No. 824, twelve municipalities and the cities of Caloocan, Pasay and Quezon City were excised from the province of Rizal and thus the Southern Tagalog region to form the National Capital Region.

=== Partitioning ===
Southern Tagalog was divided into Calabarzon (Region IV-A) and Mimaropa (Region IV-B), upon the issuance of Executive Order No. 103, dated May 17, 2002, by President Gloria Macapagal Arroyo. Additionally, the province of Aurora was moved to Region III (Central Luzon), the physical location of the province.

== Proposed revival ==
In 2026, Interior and Local Government Secretary Jonvic Remulla proposed restructuring Mimaropa and integrating it back into a unified Region IV divided into four subregions: Cavite and Palawan; Batangas and Mindoro; Laguna and Rizal; and Quezon, Marinduque, and Romblon. This overhaul aims to improve governance and address geographical hurdles such as the island provinces in Mimaropa requiring travel through Metro Manila and most regional offices being located outside Mimaropa's regional center of Calapan.

== Administrative divisions ==
=== Provinces ===
Province	Provincial capital	Current region
Aurora	Baler	Central Luzon
Batangas	Batangas City	Calabarzon
Cavite	Imus (Note: De facto capital) / Trece Martires (Note: De jure capital; Seat of government)	Calabarzon
Laguna	Santa Cruz	Calabarzon
Marinduque	Boac	Mimaropa
Occidental Mindoro	Mamburao	Mimaropa
Oriental Mindoro	Calapan	Mimaropa
Palawan	Puerto Princesa (Note: Highly urbanized city)	Mimaropa
Quezon	Lucena	Calabarzon (Note: Several municipalities of Rizal were partitioned to form Metro Manila on November 7, 1975.)
Rizal	Pasig (Note: Annexed into Metro Manila; highly urbanized city) / Antipolo	Calabarzon
Romblon	Romblon	Mimaropa

Camarines Norte and Camarines Sur, which are under Bicol Region, are sometimes considered part of Southern Tagalog recently, as there has been a language shift in recent years to Tagalog, which is more common native language, from being historically Bikol-speaking provinces.

=== Cities ===
Southern Tagalog region had 13 chartered cities prior to its partition.

- Antipolo
- Batangas City
- Calapan
- Calamba
- Cavite City
- Lipa
- Lucena
- Puerto Princesa
- Quezon City
- San Pablo
- Tagaytay
- Tanauan
- Trece Martires

Cities that were recently added after the partition (all of these are located in Southern Tagalog mainland or Calabarzon):

- Bacoor
- Biñan
- Cabuyao
- Calaca
- Carmona
- Dasmariñas
- General Trias
- Imus
- San Pedro
- Santa Rosa
- Santo Tomas
- Tayabas

== Demographics ==
=== Languages ===
The native languages of Southern Tagalog are:

- Alangan, spoken in the interior of Mindoro.
- Asi, spoken in Romblon and Marinduque.
- Buhid, spoken in the interior of Mindoro.
- Calamian Tagbanwa, spoken in Palawan.
- Chavacano, spoken in parts of Cavite.
- Cuyonon, spoken in Palawan.
- Hanunoo, spoken in the interior of Mindoro.
- Hiligaynon, spoken in eastern parts of Palawan, southern parts of Romblon and Mindoro. There are also significant speakers in Cavite, Laguna, Rizal, Quezon, Batangas and southern parts of Mindoro where the language is not native.
- Kinaray-a, spoken in eastern parts of Palawan, southern parts of Romblon and Mindoro. There are also significant speakers in Cavite, Laguna, Rizal, Quezon, Batangas and southern parts of Mindoro where the language is not native.
- Iraya, spoken in the interior of Mindoro.
- Malay, spoken in south Palawan.
- Manide, spoken in Quezon.
- Molbog, spoken in south Palawan.
- Onhan, spoken in Romblon.
- Palawano, spoken in Palawan.
- Ratagnon, spoken in south Mindoro
- Romblomanon, spoken in Romblon.
- Tadyawan, spoken in the interior of Mindoro.
- Tagalog, spoken in Cavite, Laguna, Batangas, Rizal, Quezon, Occidental Mindoro, Oriental Mindoro, Marinduque, Romblon, and Palawan. It is the regional lingua franca, mostly as Filipino.
- Tausug, spoken in southwestern Palawan. There are also significant speakers in other parts of Southern Tagalog especially in urban areas where the language is not native.
- Tawbuid, spoken in the interior of Mindoro.

Other native languages spoken in Southern Tagalog are Hatang Kayi, also named as Sinauna, a Central Luzon language spoken in Tanay, Rizal and General Nakar, Quezon (this is related to Kapampangan and Sambalic languages), the Manide language in east Quezon and a small portion in north Quezon, the Umiray Dumaget language in north Quezon and a small area in central Quezon, the Inagta Alabat language on Alabat Island, and the Tagabulós language in Infanta. The languages not native to the region are: Ilocano in Quezon, Laguna, Rizal, Cavite, Batangas, Mindoro, and Palawan (Aurora & Quezon have the largest concentration of Ilocano speakers when Aurora was part of Southern Tagalog, the statistics now exclusively belong to Quezon); Bikol in Quezon, Batangas, Cavite, Laguna, Rizal, and Marinduque; Cebuano in Rizal, Batangas, Cavite, and Quezon (especially in the remote parts of San Andres and San Francisco, the southernmost municipalities both located in the Bondoc Peninsula); Kapampangan and Pangasinan in Batangas, Cavite, Mindoro and Palawan; Maranao and Maguindanaon in many parts of the region especially in urban areas.
