= Katabangan language =

Extinct Austronesian language of Philippines

Katabangan
- Catanauanin
- Katabangan
- Native to: Philippines
- Region: Bondoc Peninsula
- Ethnicity: Katabangan
- Extinct: (date missing)
- Language family: Austronesian: Malayo-Polynesian; Philippine; (unclassified); Manide–Alabat?; Katabangan

Language codes
- ISO 639-3: ktq
- Glottolog: kata1268

Katabangan (Catanauan "Ayta", also called Catanauanin) is an extinct Aeta language that was spoken in the Bondoc Peninsula of Quezon Province, southern Luzon in the Philippines. It is misspelled Katabaga in Ethnologue.

The Katabangan have completely switched to Filipino. Katabangan is also used by some people in the Bikol Region to refer to mixed-blood Agta. Zubiri believes it is likely related to Inagta Alabat and to the Manide of western and central Camarines Norte.

== History and status ==
The language was originally listed by Garvan (1963: 8). Katabaga is in fact a misspelling of Katabangan, the name that the people use to refer to themselves. Some people in the Bikol Region also use the term Katabangan to refer to mixed-blood Agta in the region. Lobel (2013: 92) reports from a 2006 visit that the Katabangan speak only Tagalog. According to Lobel (2013), based on its present-day location, if the Katabangan did in fact once have their own language, it could possibly have been related to Inagta Alabat (see Inagta Alabat language) and Manide.

Louward Allen Zubiri reports that there are 670 individuals in the Katabangan community. The community was granted an ancestral domain title by the government of the Philippines in 2015. There are also families living in Mulanay, Gumaca, Lopez, and Alabat.

== Vocabulary ==
Zubiri compares a few Katabangan lexical items remembered by elders and notes clear similarities with Inagta Alabat and Manide.

gloss	Katabangan	Inagta Alabat	Manide
many	duyaan	maubya	kaulaan
rain	games	gemes	gemes
tomorrow	gumaak	gumaak	gumaak
to go	pataun	pataun	pataun
