= Calabarzon =

Administrative region of the Philippines

Calabarzon Southern Tagalog
- Region
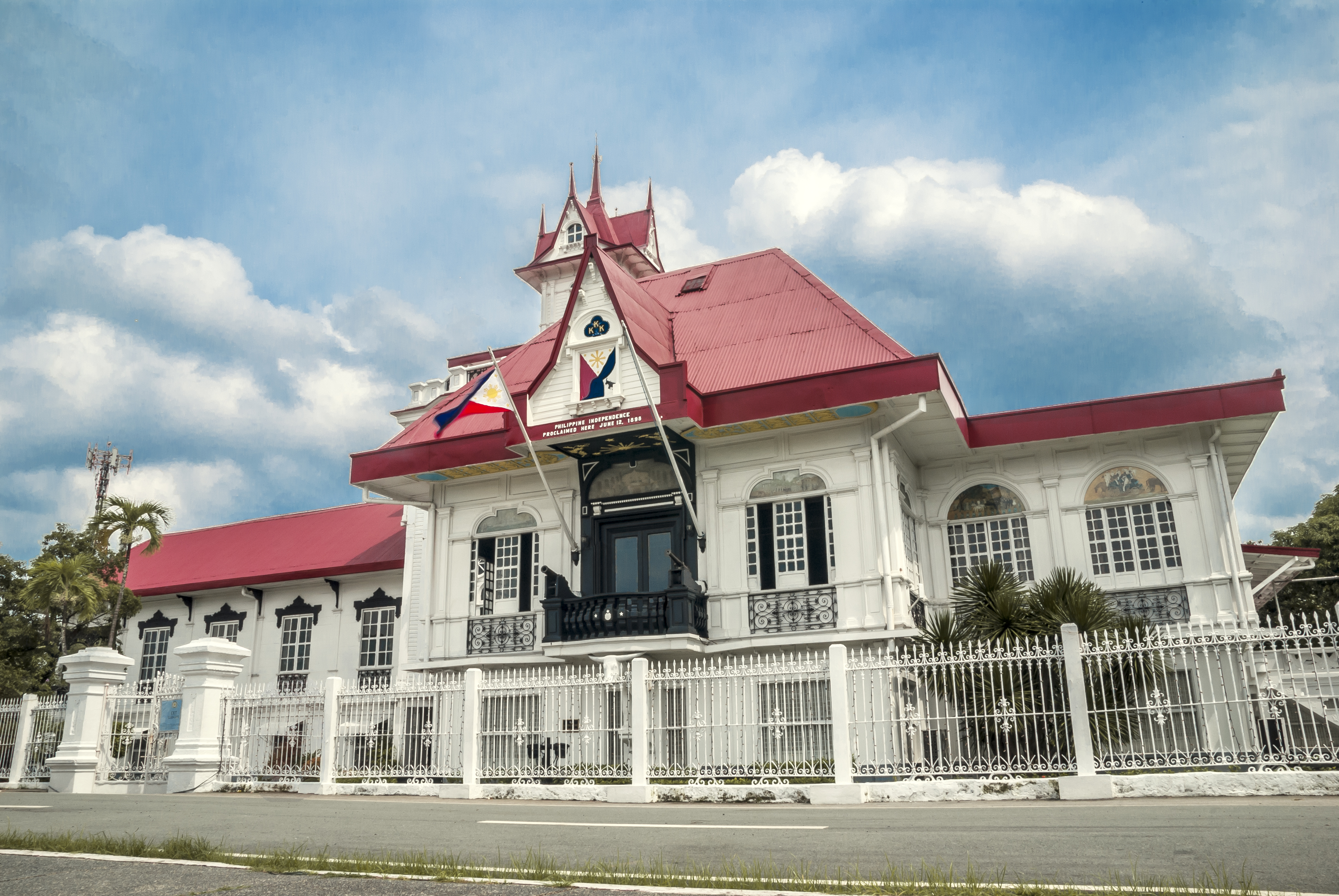
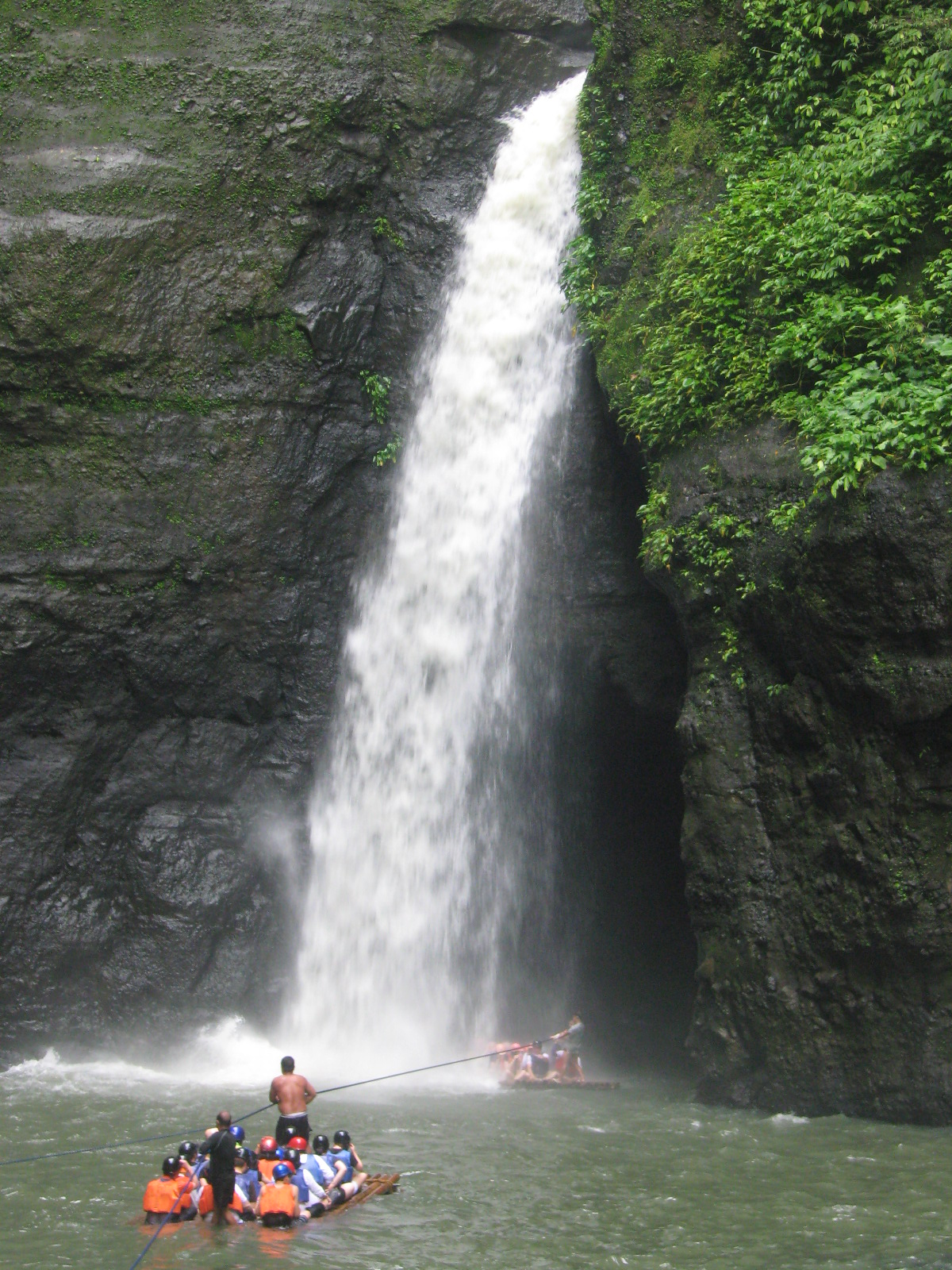
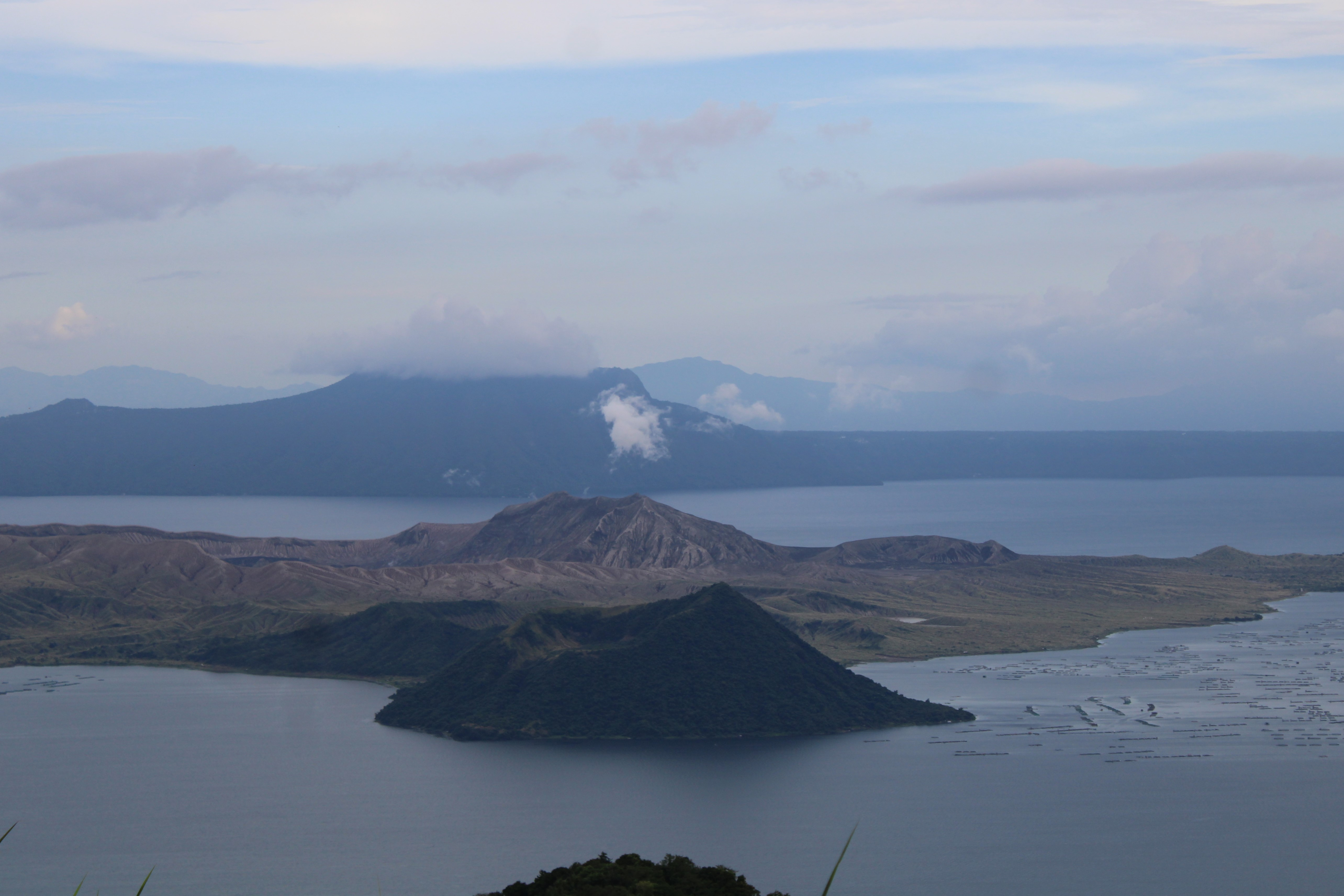
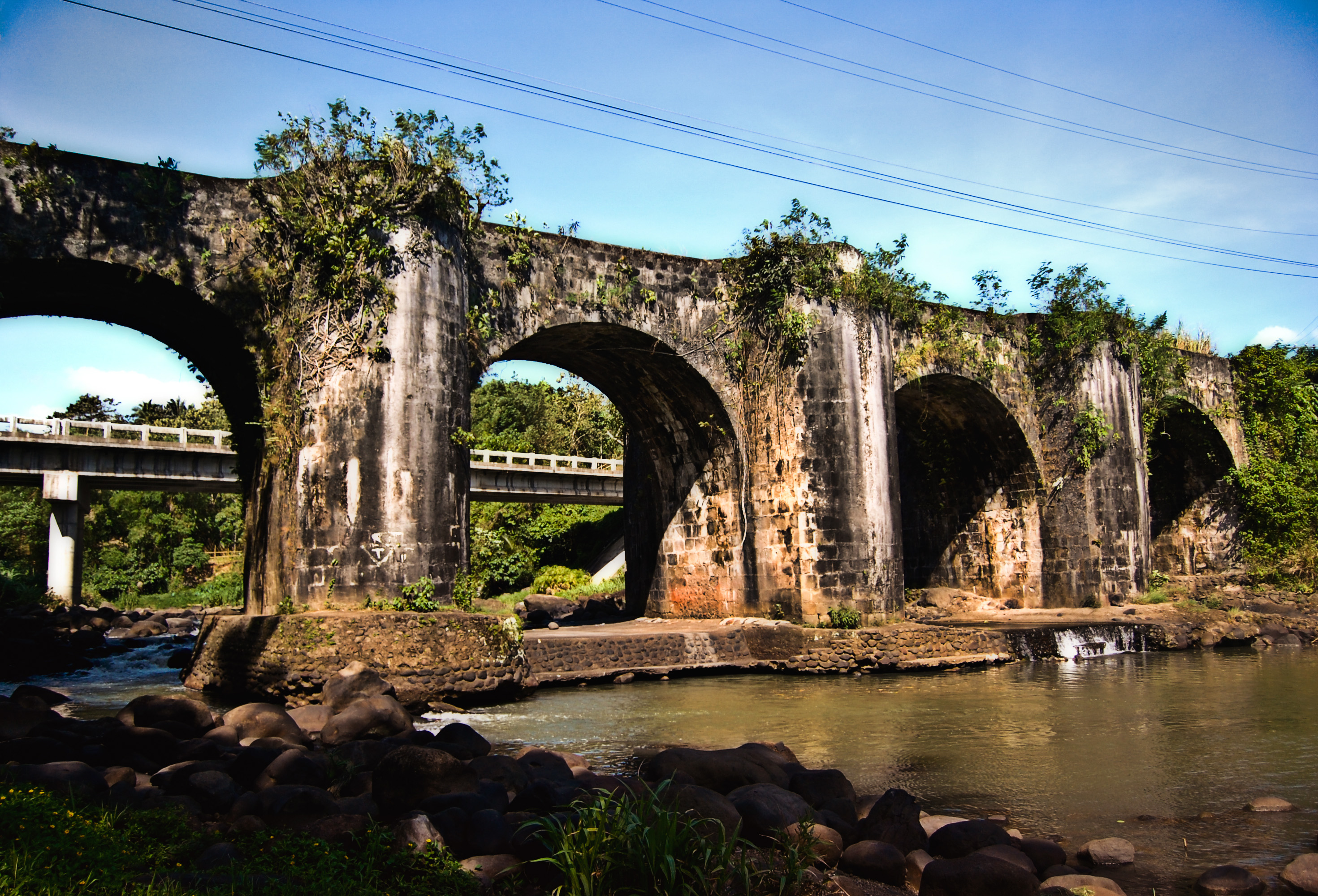
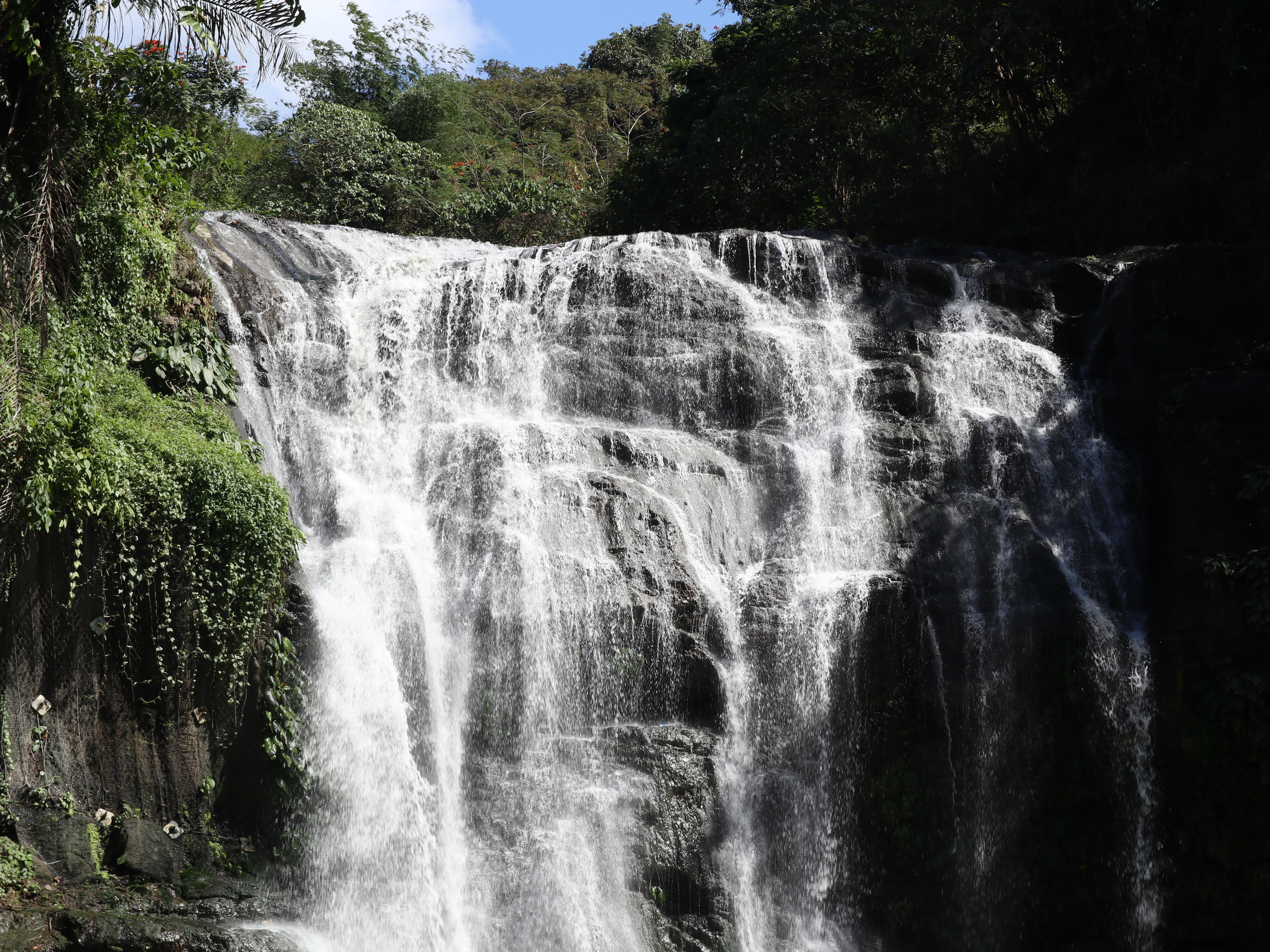
- Clockwise (from the top): Aguinaldo Shrine in Cavite, Taal Volcano in Batangas, Hinulugang Taktak in Rizal, Malagonlong Bridge in Quezon, and Pagsanjan Falls in Laguna
- Motto: Calabarzon sa Habang Panahon! (Calabarzon Forever!)
- Anthem: Calabarzon March (any year versions)
- Location in the Philippines
- Interactive map of Calabarzon
- Coordinates: 14°00′N 121°30′E
- Country: Philippines
- Island group: Luzon
- Regional center: Calamba
- Largest city: Antipolo

Area
  - Total: 16,873.31 km^{2} (6,514.82 sq mi)
- Highest elevation (Mount Banahaw): 2,170 m (7,120 ft)

Population (2024 census)
  - Total: 16,933,234
  - Rank: 1st
  - Density: 1,003.551/km^{2} (2,599.186/sq mi)
  - Households: 4,062,720

Divisions
  - Provinces: 5: Batangas; Cavite; Laguna; Quezon; Rizal
  - Independent city: 1: Lucena
  - Component cities: 21: Antipolo; Bacoor; Batangas City; Biñan; Cabuyao; Calaca; Calamba; Carmona; Cavite City; Dasmariñas; General Trias; Imus; Lipa; San Pablo; San Pedro; Santa Rosa; Santo Tomas; Tagaytay; Tanauan; Tayabas; Trece Martires
  - Municipalities: 120
  - Barangays: 4,019
  - Districts: 19

Economy
  - Poverty incidence: 2.7% (2025)
  - GDP total: US$65.2 billion
  - GDP per capita: US$3,831
  - HDI (2023): 0.734 high · 4th of 17
- Time zone: UTC+8 (PST)
- PSGC: 0400000000
- ISO 3166 code: PH-40
- Electorate: 9,714,079 voters (2025)
- Native languages: Tagalog; Chavacano; Hatang Kayi; Manide; Umiray Dumaget; Ayta Kadi

Calabarzon (officially stylized in all caps; English: /ˌkɑːləbɑːrˈzɒn/; Tagalog: [kalɐbaɾˈsɔn]), sometimes referred to as Southern Tagalog (Tagalog: Timog Katagalugan) and designated as Region IV‑A, (Note: Calabarzon (Region IV-A) and Mimaropa (formerly Region IV-B) were formed through the division of the former Southern Tagalog region (Region IV). The designation Region IV-B was officially dropped in 2016 through Republic Act No. 10879. However, the law did not include any provision concerning Region IV-A, thereby maintaining the status quo with respect to Calabarzon. For a brief period following the division, the designation Region IV-A was also used for Southern Tagalog when it functioned as a sub-region of Metro Manila.) is an administrative region in the Philippines. It is situated southeast of Metro Manila and is bordered by Manila Bay and the South China Sea to the west, Lamon Bay and the Bicol Region to the east, Tayabas Bay and the Sibuyan Sea to the south, and Central Luzon to the north. Comprising five provinces—Cavite, Laguna, Batangas, Rizal, and Quezon (hence the acronym)—and one highly urbanized city, Lucena, it is the most populous region in the Philippines, according to the 2024 census, with over 16.9 million inhabitants. It is also the country's second most densely populated region, after the National Capital Region. Calamba in Laguna serves as the regional center, while Antipolo in Rizal is the most populous city in the region.

Before its creation as a separate region, Calabarzon, along with the Mimaropa region, the province of Aurora, and parts of Metro Manila, comprised the historical region known as Southern Tagalog until they were separated in 2002 through Executive Order No. 103.

The history of the area now known as Calabarzon dates back to early historic times. Local historians assert that three of the 10th century place-names mentioned in the Philippines' earliest known written document, the Laguna Copperplate Inscription, pertain to regions or polities (bayan) along the shores of Laguna de Bay; and some Filipino-Chinese scholars think the 10th century trading polity known as Ma-i may actually have been the predecessor of the present day town of Bay, Laguna. Since the Spanish colonial period of the Philippines, the region has served as home to some of the most important Philippine historical figures, including the Philippine national hero, José Rizal, who was born in Calamba.

== Etymology ==
The name Calabarzon is derived from the first syllables of Cavite (Ca), Laguna (la), and Batangas (ba), the first letter of Rizal (r), and the last syllable of Quezon (zon).

== History ==
On June 5, 1901, a convention was called on whether or not the province of Manila should annex the district of Morong, which was found to be unable to be self-sufficient as a province. Eventually, on June 11, Act No. 137 of the First Philippine Commission abolished Morong and created a new province, named after the Philippines' national hero, Jose Rizal, who, coincidentally, was a native of Laguna. The new province comprised 29 municipalities: 17 from Manila and 12 from Morong. In 1902, Macario Sakay, a veteran Katipunan member, established the Tagalog Republic in the mountains of Rizal. Ultimately, Sakay's Tagalog Republic ended in 1906 when he and his men were betrayed under the guise of holding a national assembly aimed at the self-determination of the Filipino people.

On September 7, 1946, the Third Philippine Republic enacted Republic Act No. 14, which renamed the province of Tayabas to Quezon, in honor of Manuel L. Quezon, the second President of the Philippines and elected governor of Tayabas in 1906 and assemblyman of 1st district of Tayabas in 1907 and a native of Baler (now part of Aurora), formerly one of the towns of the province. In 1951, the northern part of Quezon became the sub-province Aurora, named after the former president's wife, also a native of Baler. One obvious reason for creating the sub-province was the area's isolation from the rest of Quezon Province: there were no direct links to the rest of the province and much of the terrain was mountainous and heavily forested, which made the area relatively isolated, and its distance from Quezon's capital Lucena.

On September 24, 1972, President Ferdinand Marcos enacted Presidential Decree No. 1, which organized the provinces into 11 regions as part of Marcos' Integrated Reorganization Plan. The IRP created Region IV, known as the Southern Tagalog region, and was the largest region in the Philippines. At this time, Region IV consisted of Batangas, Cavite, Laguna, Marinduque, Oriental Mindoro, Occidental Mindoro, Quezon, Rizal, Romblon, and Palawan. In 1979, Aurora formally became a province independent of Quezon and was also included in Region IV.

On May 17, 2002, President Gloria Macapagal Arroyo signed Executive Order No. 103, which reorganized the Southern Tagalog region. Due to its size, Region IV was split into two separate regions, Region IV-A (Calabarzon) and Region IV-B (Mimaropa). Aurora was transferred to Region III (Central Luzon); the total separation of Aurora from Quezon & transfer of Aurora to Central Luzon were the fulfillment of the wishes of the residents of the original municipalities of Baler and Casiguran to be truly independent from the Quezon Province for the first time & the result of original formation of Pampanga since the Spanish occupation. Many residents and government leaders of Aurora objected to the change, as Aurora maintains strong historical and cultural connections to the rest of Southern Tagalog, particularly Quezon Province, thus also of the memory of Manuel L. Quezon, and with that, Aurora residents self-identified with Quezon; but Aurora's transfer to Central Luzon means that geographically, the province is more accessible by land from Nueva Ecija and of course, San Fernando, Pampanga, the regional capital of Central Luzon. The next year, Arroyo signed Executive Order No. 246, which declared Calamba as the regional center of the region. On the other hand, Lucena is home to most of the branches of governmental agencies, businesses, banks and service facilities in the region.

== Geography ==
The region is the 12th largest region in the Philippines, with an area of 16,873.31 km^{2} (6,514.82 sq mi). The region itself is relatively flat, but also consists of coastal areas and highlands. It is bordered by Manila Bay in the west, Metro Manila, Bulacan, and Aurora in the north, Lamon Bay and Bicol in the east, and the Isla Verde Passage in the south. Each province in the region is composed of different environments, ranging from low coastal areas to rugged mountainous ones.

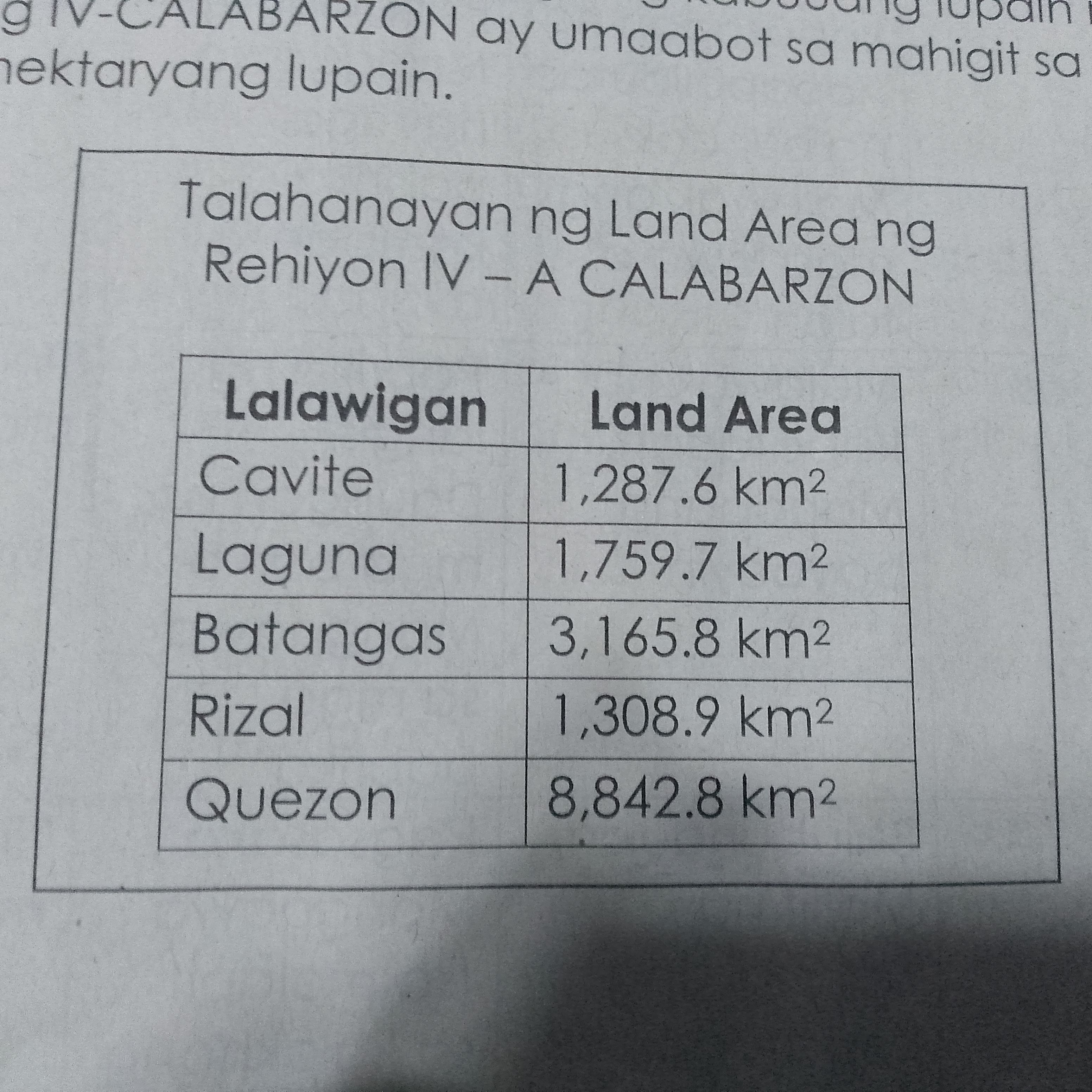
A table showing the land area of provinces of Region IV – A CALABARZON

Cavite is characterized by rolling hinterlands punctured by hills, with a shoreline bordering Manila Bay and a rugged portion bordering Batangas near Mount Pico de Loro. Tagaytay is located in Cavite, bordering Alfonso, Silang, Calamba, and Santa Rosa. Mount Sungay is the highest peak in the province and can be found in Tagaytay. There are nine islands in Cavite, most notable of which is the island of Corregidor. Historically a site of great strategic importance, Corregidor is found at the mouth of Manila Bay and is under the jurisdiction of Cavite City.

Laguna has rugged terrain, with narrow plains near the shores of Laguna de Bay and mountainous ranges further inland. Laguna de Bay is the largest lake in the Philippines, and is named after the town of Bay. Laguna is also home to Mount Makiling, a dormant volcano near Los Baños reputed for its mystical properties. There are also a lot of hot springs near the Makiling area, especially in San Pablo. Another famous landmark in Laguna are the Pagsanjan Falls, in Cavinti. The water from the Pagsanjan Falls comes from the Bumbungan River. Mount Banahaw borders Laguna and Quezon, and is similarly considered to be a holy mountain like Makiling.

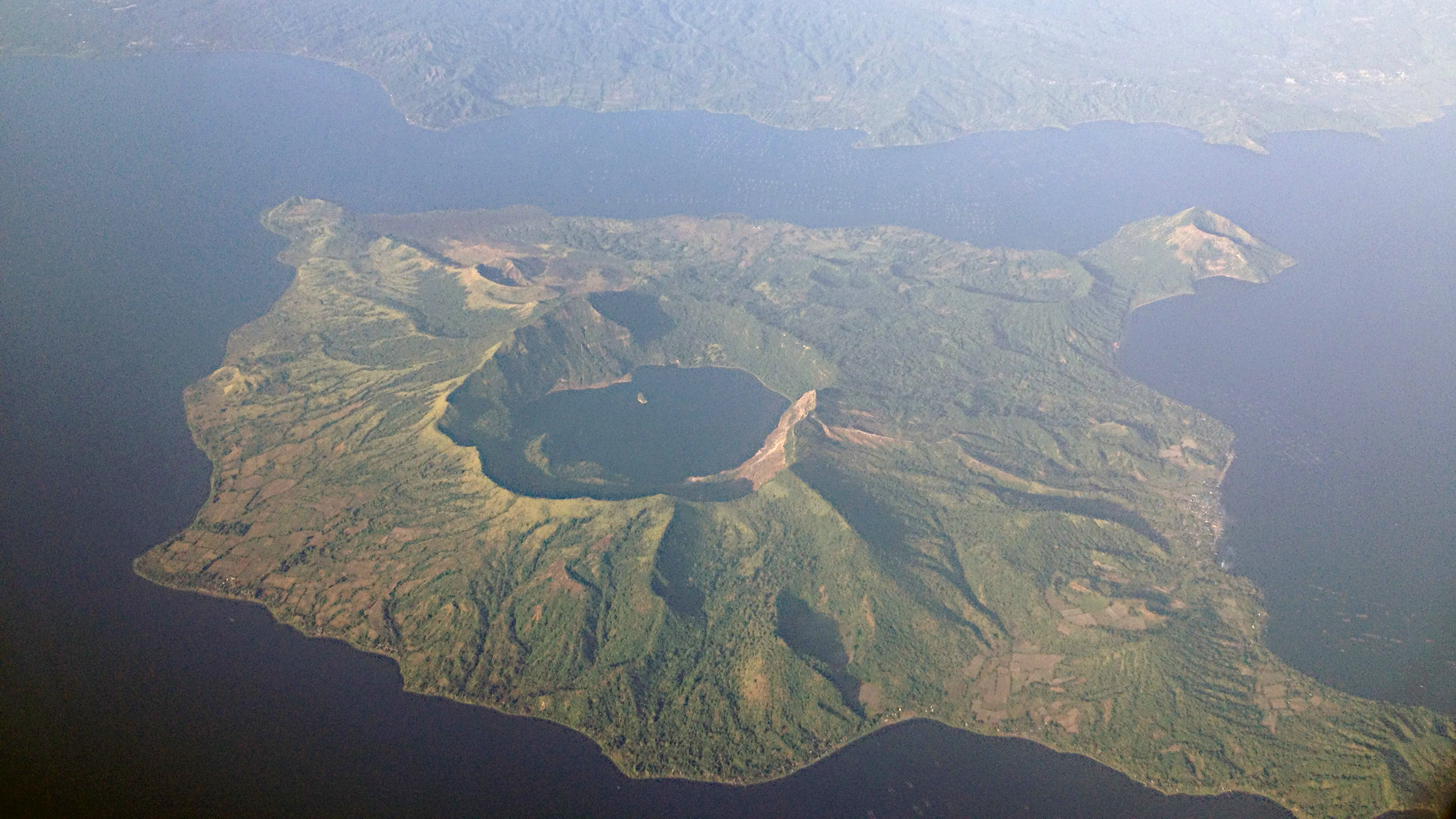
Aerial view of the Taal Volcano

The Batangas area is mostly elevated, with small low flat lands and scattered mountain areas. Batangas is also home to the Taal Volcano, a complex volcano and one of the 16 Decade Volcanoes. The Taal Volcano is situated within Taal Lake, making Taal a third-order island, and possibly one of the largest in the world. Other islands in Batangas are Verde Island, near the Isla Verde Passage, and Fortune Island in Nasugbu. Batangas borders Cavite via Mount Pico de Loro, known for the views that could be found in its summit. Mount Macolod and Mount Batulao can also be found in Batangas.

Rizal is situated north of Laguna de Bay, and consists of a mixture of valleys and mountain ranges, with flat low-lying areas in the western portion of the province near Manila. The eastern portion of Rizal has hills and ridges which form part of the Sierra Madre range. Talim Island, the largest island in Laguna de Bay, is under the jurisdiction of the province of Rizal.

Quezon province is mountainous, with few plains and swamps, and the tail-end of the Sierra Madre running through it. Quezon is a narrow province, with the Tayabas Isthmus comprising the southern part of the province and connecting it to the Bicol Peninsula. The southern part also consists of the Bondoc Peninsula, sandwiched between the Tayabas Bay and Ragay Gulf.

The largest islands in Quezon are the Alabat and Polillo islands, which are both located in Lamon Bay, connecting to Calauag Bay of the town of Calauag. Laguna shares a border with Quezon via Mount Banahaw.

== Administrative divisions ==
=== Provinces ===
Political map of Calabarzon

Calabarzon comprises five provinces, 1 highly urbanized city, 21 component cities and 4,019 barangays.

Province or HUC		Capital	Population (2024)		Area		Density		Cities	Muni.	Barangay
					km^{2}	sq mi	/km^{2}	/sq mi			
Batangas		Batangas City	17.7%	2,994,795	3,115.05	1,202.73	960	2,500	5	29	1,078
Cavite		Imus	27.0%	4,573,884	1,526.28	589.30	2,800	7,300	8	15	829
Laguna		Santa Cruz	21.8%	3,687,345	1,928.23	744.49	1,900	4,900	6	24	681
Quezon		Lucena †	11.7%	1,980,338	8,743.84	3,376.02	230	600	1	39	1,209
Rizal		Antipolo	20.2%	3,416,541	1,182.65	456.62	2,900	7,500	1	13	189
Lucena	†	—	1.7%	280,331	80.21	30.97	3,500	9,100	1	—	33
Total				16,195,042	16,576.26	6,400.13	980	2,500	21	122	4,019
† Lucena is a highly urbanized city; figures are excluded from Quezon province.

==== Governors and vice governors ====
Governors and vice governors in Calabarzon
Province		Governor			Vice governor		
Name	Map	Image	Name	Party	Image	Name	Party
Batangas			Vilma Santos	Nacionalista		Hermilando Mandanas	PDP–Laban
Cavite			Abeng Remulla	NUP		Ram Revilla	Lakas
Laguna			Sol Aragones	AKAY		JM Carait	Lakas
Rizal			Nina Ynares	NPC		Josefina Gatlabayan	NPC
Quezon			Angelina Tan	Stan Q		Anacleto Alcala III	Stan Q

=== Cities ===
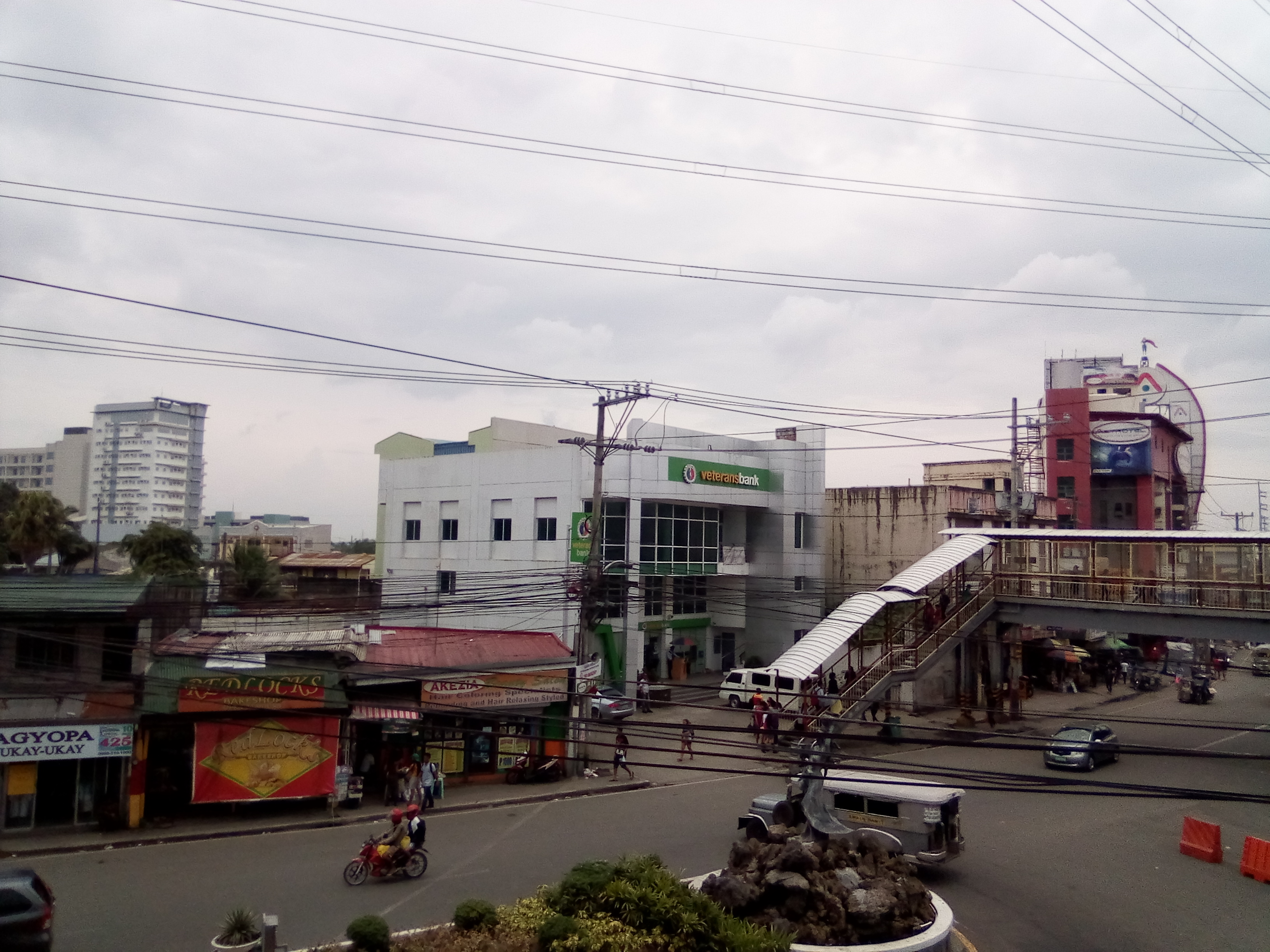
View of the City of Calamba, Laguna

Calabarzon has 22 cities (21 component cities and 1 highly urbanized city of Lucena) in total, making it the region with the most cities amongst the Luzon regions. Antipolo is the most populous city in the region, as well as the 6th most populous city of the whole Philippines, while Bacoor and San Pedro is the most densely populated cities in the whole region. A large section of Calabarzon is considered part of the Greater Manila Area; while Batangas City is the center of the Batangas metropolitan area. The region has a gross regional product of ₱1.65 trillion (at current prices), which accounts for 17% of the national GDP.

On August 7, 2000, the municipality of Los Baños, Laguna, was declared as a "Special Science and Nature City of the Philippines" through Presidential Proclamation No. 349 in recognition of its importance as a center for science and technology, being home to many educational, environmental and research institutions. This proclamation does not convert the municipality to a city or give it corporate powers that are accorded to other cities.

- † Regional center

City	Population (2024)	Area		Density		City class	Income class	Province
		km^{2}	sq mi	/km^{2}	/sq mi			
Antipolo (Note: Antipolo was declared a "highly-urbanized city" by President Benigno Aquino; such proclamation however still needs to be ratified in a plebiscite.)	913,712	306.10	118.19	3,000	7,800	Component	1st	Rizal
Bacoor (Note: Bacoor was declared a "highly urbanized city" by President Rodrigo Duterte; such proclamation however still needs to be ratified in a plebiscite.)	661,381	46.17	17.83	14,000	36,000	Component	1st	Cavite
Batangas City	358,267	282.96	109.25	1,300	3,400	Component	1st	Batangas
Biñan	584,479	43.50	16.80	9,400	24,000	Component	1st	Laguna
Cabuyao	365,202	43.40	16.76	8,400	22,000	Component	1st	Laguna
Calaca	92,281	114.58	44.24	810	2,100	Component	N/A	Batangas
† Calamba	575,046	149.50	57.72	3,800	9,800	Component	1st	Laguna
Carmona	112,140	29.68	11.46	3,800	9,800	Component	N/A	Cavite
Cavite City	98,673	10.89	4.20	9,100	24,000	Component	4th	Cavite
Dasmariñas	744,511	90.13	34.80	8,300	21,000	Component	1st	Cavite
General Trias	482,453	90.01	34.75	5,400	14,000	Component	1st	Cavite
Imus	481,949	53.15	20.52	9,100	24,000	Component	1st	Cavite
Lipa	387,392	209.40	80.85	1,900	4,900	Component	1st	Batangas
Lucena	280,331	80.21	30.97	3,500	9,100	Highly Urbanized	1st	Quezon
San Pablo	300,166	197.56	76.28	1,500	3,900	Component	1st	Laguna
San Pedro	348,968	24.05	9.29	15,000	39,000	Component	1st	Laguna
Santa Rosa	430,920	54.84	21.17	7,900	20,000	Component	1st	Laguna
Santo Tomas	226,772	95.41	36.84	6,200	16,000	Component	1st	Batangas
Tagaytay	87,811	65.00	25.10	1,400	3,600	Component	2nd	Cavite
Tanauan	209,697	107.16	41.37	2,000	5,200	Component	1st	Batangas
Tayabas	115,318	230.95	89.17	500	1,300	Component	6th	Quezon
Trece Martires	227,892	39.10	15.10	5,800	15,000	Component	4th	Cavite

== Demographics ==
Population census of Calabarzon

Year	Pop.	±% p.a.
1903	739,776	—
1918	962,856	+1.77%
1939	1,388,269	+1.76%
1948	1,592,493	+1.54%
1960	2,316,173	+3.17%
1970	3,356,327	+3.77%

Year	Pop.	±% p.a.
1975	3,904,174	+3.08%
1980	4,603,435	+3.35%
1990	6,349,452	+3.27%
1995	7,750,204	+3.81%
2000	9,320,629	+4.03%
2007	11,757,755	+3.26%

Year	Pop.	±% p.a.
2010	12,609,803	+2.58%
2015	14,414,774	+2.58%
2020	16,195,042	+2.48%
2024	16,933,234	+1.08%

Source: Philippine Statistics Authority

Calabarzon has a population of 16.9 million people, the largest of all the regions of the Philippines. The population growth rate between 2000 and 2010 of 3.07% decreased from the growth rate between 1990 and 2000 of 3.91%, a trend which coincided with the rest of the nation. Life expectancy in Calabarzon is 68.9 years for men and 75.2 years for women. There are an estimated 356,000 Overseas Filipino Workers originating from Calabarzon.

A vast majority of people living in Calabarzon are Tagalogs. It is estimated that around 5.8 million Tagalogs live in Region IV-A. Taal, in particular, is considered the "Heartland of Tagalog Culture" and is currently the "center" of the Tagalog culture and people. Calabarzon is also home to a sizable number of people with Chinese and Spanish ancestry on account of Chinese immigration and Spanish colonization, respectively.

=== Languages ===
Because of the large majority of Tagalog natives, the majority of people living in Calabarzon speak the Tagalog language. Filipino, being a version of Tagalog, is predominant in the region, which is spoken as a lingua franca of Tagalog speakers of different dialects. English is also used in Calabarzon. In Cavite, Chavacano, a creole language, was once commonly spoken; however, its usage is now in steep decline, and it is now only spoken by a handful of elderly residents in the province. The other native language spoken in Calabarzon is Hatang Kayi, also named as Sinauna, a Central Luzon language spoken in Tanay, Rizal and General Nakar, Quezon; this is related to Kapampangan and Sambalic languages. Other native languages spoken in the region are the Manide language in east Quezon and a small portion in north Quezon, the Umiray Dumaget language in north Quezon and a small area in central Quezon, the Inagta Alabat language on Alabat Island, and the Tagabulós language in Infanta. Languages not native in the region are also spoken by minority residents, including Bicolano, Butuanon, Cebuano, various Cordilleran languages, Cuyunon, Hiligaynon, Ilocano (especially in Quezon bordering Aurora), Karay-a, Kapampangan, Lumad (indigenous tribal languages in Mindanao), Surigaonon, Waray, Maguindanaon, Maranao and Tausug.

=== Religion ===
The large majority of the population of Calabarzon are part of a Christian denomination, with the Catholic Church forming the largest proportion with its adherents accounting for 89% of the regional population. It is then followed up by the Iglesia ni Cristo (3.06%), Philippine Independent Church (0.066%) and the Jesus is Lord Church (0.4%). A small Muslim population also exists, accounting for 0.4% of the regional population.

Population by religious affiliation in CALABARZON (2020)
Affiliation	Number	Percentage
Roman Catholic (Note: excluding Catholic Charismatic numbering 13,287 persons (0.08%))	14,390,095	89.1%
Iglesia ni Cristo	494,599	3.06%
Philippine Independent Church	107,210	0.66%
Islam	80,057	0.50%
Jesus is Lord Church	65,036	0.4%
Church of Christ	63,664	0.39%
Seventh-day Adventist	58,949	0.37%
Bible Baptist Church	52,301	0.32%
Christian Missions in the Philippines	45,166	0.28%
Jehovah's Witnesses	45,122	0.28%
Other religious affiliations	737,571	4.57%
None	3,338	0.02%
Not reported	805	0%
Total	16,139,770	100%
Source: Philippine Statistics Authority

== Economy ==
Poverty incidence of Calabarzon (%)

Source: Philippine Statistics Authority

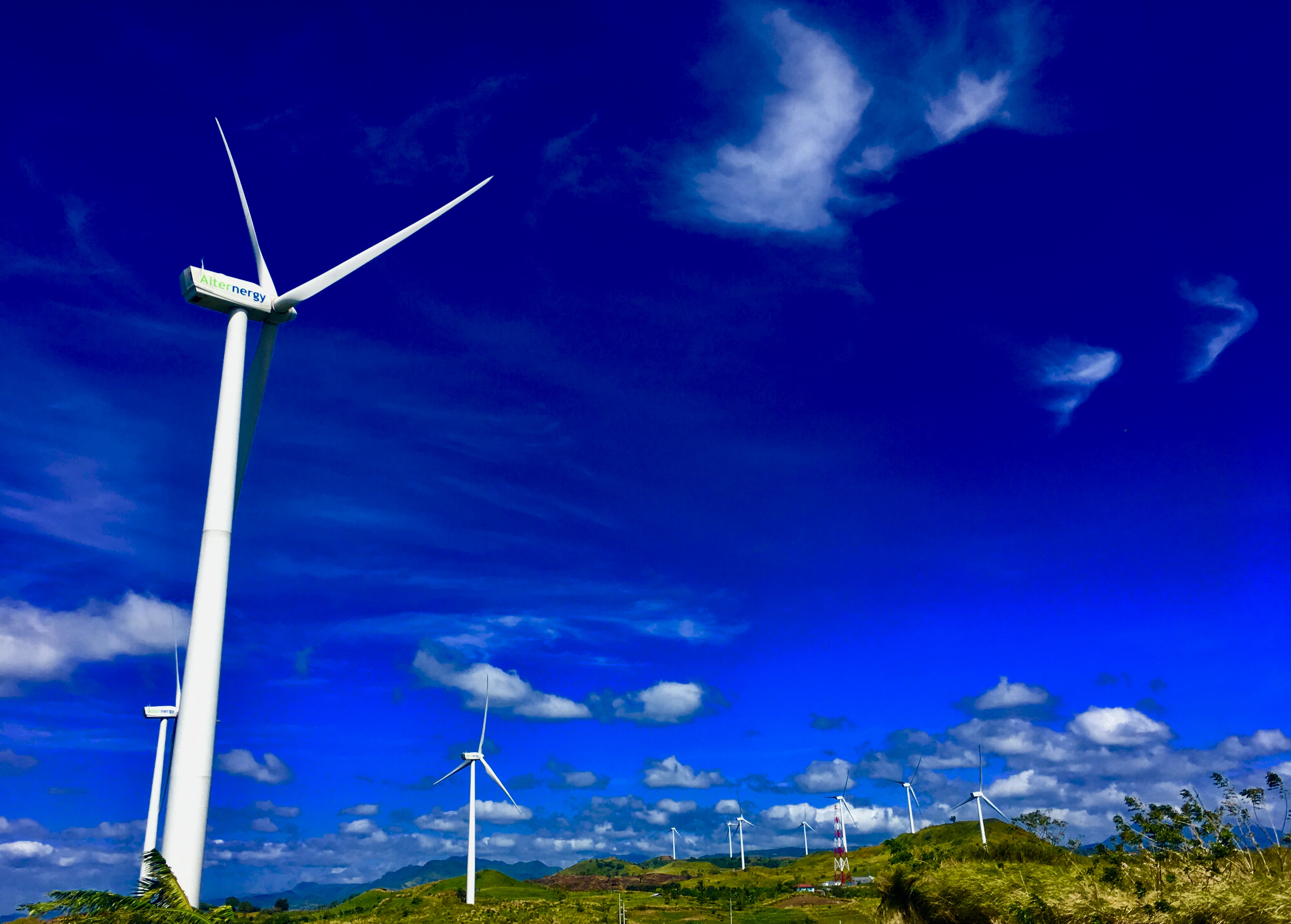
Pililla Wind Farm in Rizal

Calabarzon is the second largest contributor to the national GDP, accounting for 17% of the gross domestic product. The region boasts a 2.1% inflation rate, lower than the national average of 3%. The region has a 9.2% unemployment rate which is higher than the national average of 7%. Calabarzon, much like the rest of the country, is caught in the middle of being an industrial and an agricultural economy.

Due to the region's proximity to Metro Manila, a large amount of urbanization has taken place over the years. Cavite and Laguna in particular are sites of manufacturing and high-tech industries, with companies like Intel and Panasonic setting up plants in the region. Santa Rosa, Laguna, is home to a host of semi-conductor and automotive companies such as Amkor and Toyota, while General Trias is home to Cavite's largest economic development zone, the PEC Industrial Park.

The region still has a large agricultural base. As of 2002, the region had 282,700 farms, covering 588,500 hectares (1,454,000 acres), or 36.3% of the region's total land area. Cavite alone has almost 70,500 hectares (174,000 acres) of agricultural land. Laguna is home to the International Rice Research Institute, which can be found within the University of the Philippines Los Baños, whose main goal is to find sustainable ways to help rice farmers. Batangas, meanwhile, is home to a large pineapple and coconut industry, which is used to make barong tagalogs and lambanog. Quezon is the country's leader in coconut products such as coconut oil and copra. Quezon's towns such as Tayabas City, Mauban and Infanta are also known producers of commercialized native liqueurs such as lambanog and tuba. Rizal is known for its piggeries. Region IV-A's agricultural base, however, is slowly decreasing. Due to their proximity to large bodies of water, Laguna and Batangas also have sizable fishing industries. Taal Lake is a large source of fresh water fishes for the country.

== Tourism ==
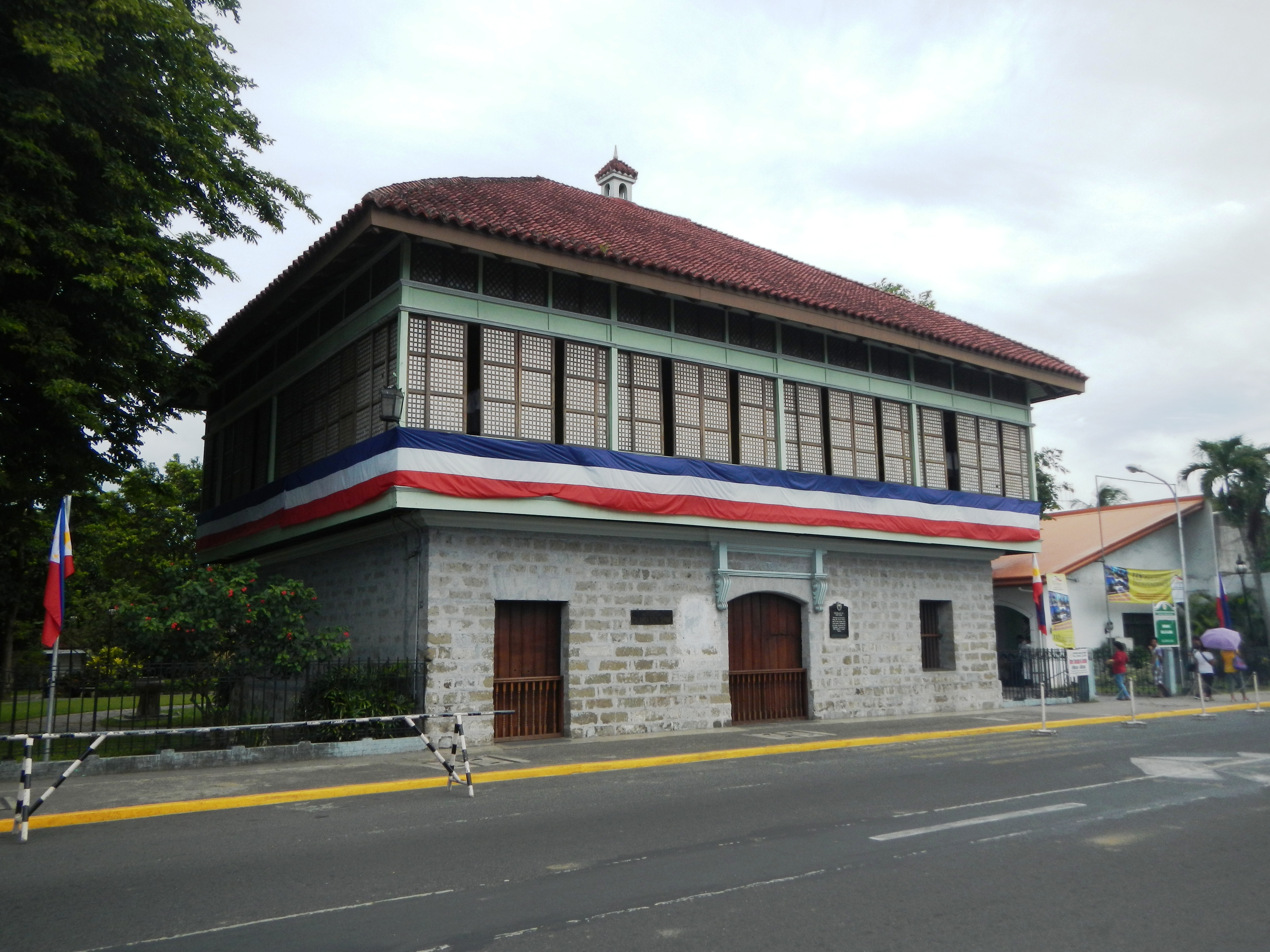
Rizal Shrine in Calamba, Laguna

Due to the region's history and natural resources, tourism plays a major role in the regional economy. Cavite and Laguna are homes to various historical sites, such as the Rizal Shrine in Calamba, and the Aguinaldo Shrine in Kawit. San Pablo is famous for its seven lakes, Pagsanjan for its majestic waterfalls and both Taal Lake and the historic Taal town in Batangas. Tayabas is known as the City of Festivals, Rest and Recreation Destination of Quezon and famous for lambanog.

The Minor Basilica of Saint Michael Archangel is the religious testaments of the Tayabenses and declared as National Cultural Treasures of the Philippines, the Casa Comunidad de Tayabas, the former office of the then President Manuel Luis Quezon and the place where Hermano Pule was sentenced to death, and the Malagonlong Bridge and the 9 other century-old Spanish arch type and National Cultural Treasure bridges. Local festivals include the Taytsinoy Festival, Mayohan Festival, Pa'yas Festival Hagisan Festival, Baliskog Festival, Angel Festival, Aguyod Festival and the Turumba Festival every Holy Week.

Lucban is most famous for its annual Pahiyas Festival or locally known as Pahiyas, an event not only visited by local tourists but also by international tourists as well. Devotees and pilgrims also visit Lucban's Kamay ni Hesus Shrine, which has a 50-foot (15 m) statue of the Ascending Christ on top of a hill. Batangas is also famous for its scenic beaches in Nasugbu and Calatagan. Antipolo is another major tourist spot, found in Rizal. The region is also home to a multitude of baroque churches.

== Infrastructure ==
=== Roads and bridges ===
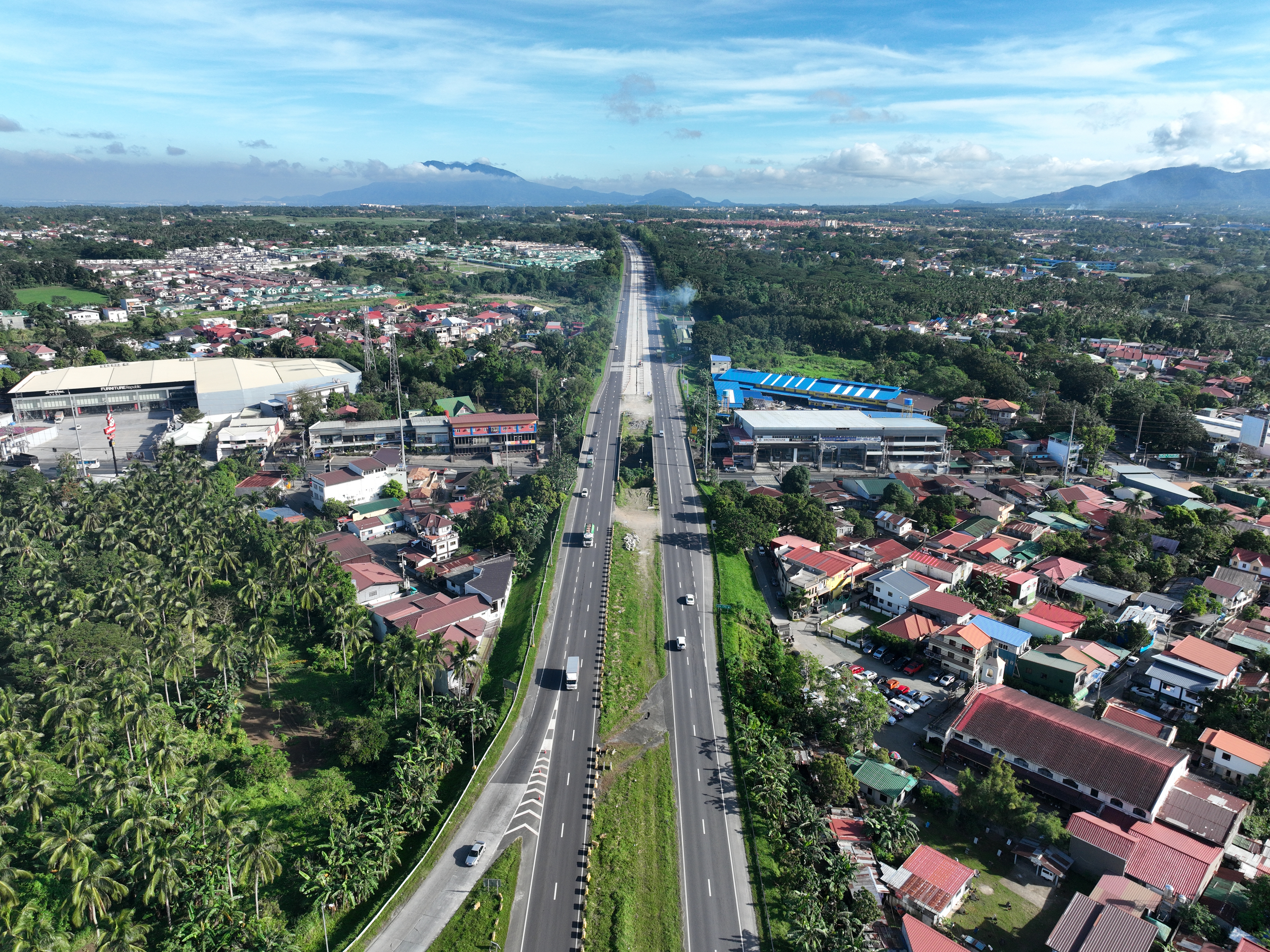
STAR Tollway, also known as the Calabarzon Expressway, in Batangas

Being an industrialized region, Calabarzon is dotted with expressways and highways to serve the people traveling to factories and industries, as well as to accommodate traffic that comes to and from Metro Manila, as it is located just east and south of the region. The Pan-Philippine Highway is an important road that crosses through Laguna, Cavite, Batangas, and Quezon, serving as a gateway to the southern parts of Luzon.

The South Luzon Expressway and Southern Tagalog Arterial Road link the port of Batangas to Metro Manila, while the Cavite–Laguna Expressway and Manila–Cavite Expressway (also known as CAVITEX) seamlessly link industrial towns and cities that dot around Cavite and Laguna. All the aforementioned expressways also help accommodate the inter-modal traffic between Calabarzon and Metro Manila, serving as a faster, more viable alternative compared to primary highways that directly cross municipal and city centers.

The Laguna Lake Highway, a joint project of DPWH NCR and Region IV-A, is the widening/rehabilitation at Taytay, Rizal segment, a 3.34-kilometer (2.08 mi) road.

Currently, there are two more bridges being built - Barkadahan Bridge and Napindan Bridge - which will provide additional 2 lanes crossing over Manggahan Floodway and Pasig River, respectively.
