= Lopez, Quezon =

Municipality in Quezon, Philippines

Lopez Talolong
- Municipality
- Municipality of Lopez
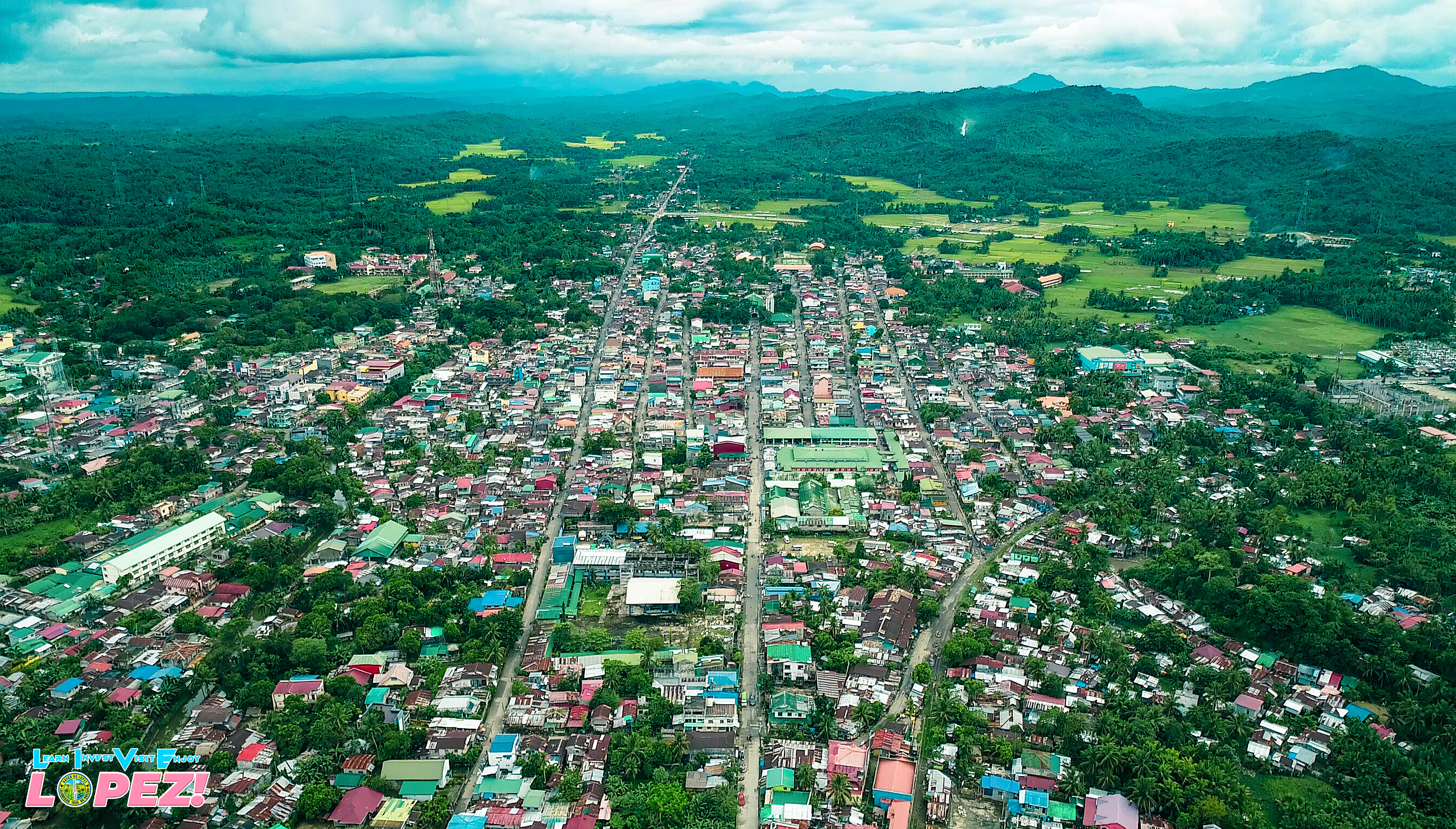

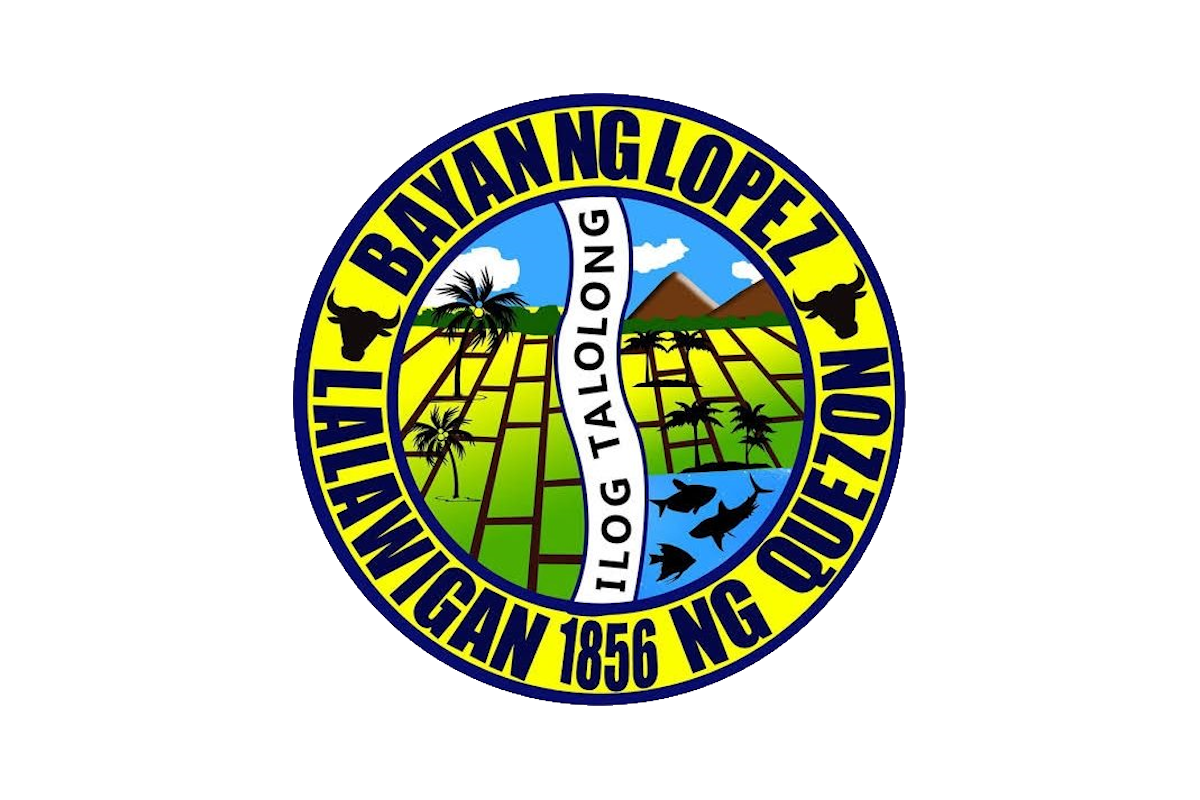
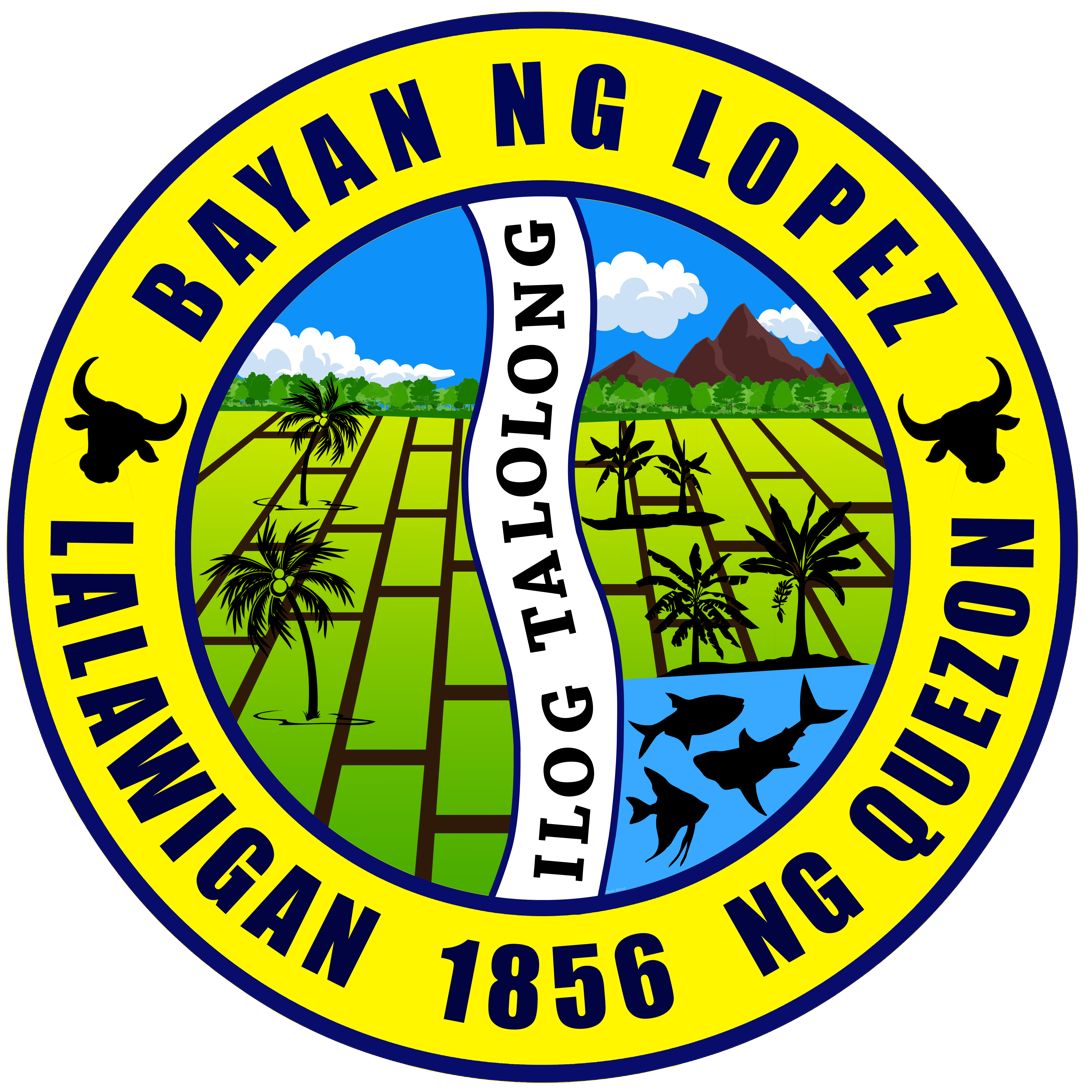
- Flag Seal

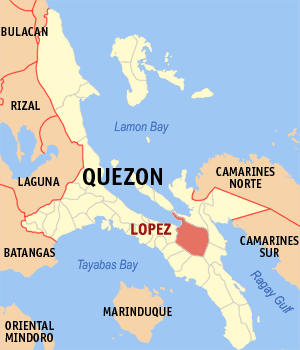
- Map of Quezon with Lopez highlighted
- Interactive map of Lopez
- Location within the Philippines
- Coordinates: 13°53′02″N 122°15′37″E
- Country: Philippines
- Region: Calabarzon
- Province: Quezon
- District: 4th district
- Founded: June 30, 1857
- Named for: Candido López y Diaz
- Barangays: 95 (see Barangays)

Government
  - Type: Sangguniang Bayan
  - Mayor: Isaias B. Ubana II
  - Vice Mayor: Danilo A. Villanueva
  - Representative: Keith Micah DL. Tan
  - Municipal Council: Members: Ira Beatrice A. Ubana; Aristotle R. Yumul; Rosemarie A. Olanda; Atty. Adrian Donald L. Segui; Rembert A. Masaganda; Efren V. Paraiso; Sheree Ann S. Alivio; Castor R. Alano
  - Electorate: 59,547 voters (2025)

Area
  - Total: 355.38 km^{2} (137.21 sq mi)
- Elevation: 43 m (141 ft)
- Highest elevation: 257 m (843 ft)
- Lowest elevation: 0 m (0 ft)

Population (2024 census)
  - Total: 96,006
  - Density: 270.15/km^{2} (699.69/sq mi)
  - Households: 23,432
- Demonym(s): Lopenze, Lopezeño

Economy
  - Income class: 1st municipal income class
  - Poverty incidence: 8.79% (2023)
  - Revenue: ₱ 415.2 million (2024)
  - Assets: ₱ 1,514 million (2024)
  - Expenditure: ₱ 346.8 million (2024)
  - Liabilities: ₱ 52.24 million (2024)

Service provider
  - Electricity: Quezon 1 Electric Cooperative (QUEZELCO 1)
- Time zone: UTC+8 (PST)
- ZIP code: 4316
- PSGC: 0405622000
- IDD : area code: +63 (0)42
- Native languages: Ayta Kadi; Manide; Tagalog
- Website: livelopez.gov.ph

Lopez, (Tagalog pronunciation: [loˈpɛs], American Spanish: Spanish pronunciation: [ˈlohˈpez], European Spanish: [ˈloʊˈpɛθ]), officially the Municipality of Lopez (Tagalog: Bayan ng Lopez), is a municipality in the province of Quezon, Philippines. According to the 2024 census, it has a population of 96,006 people.

== History ==
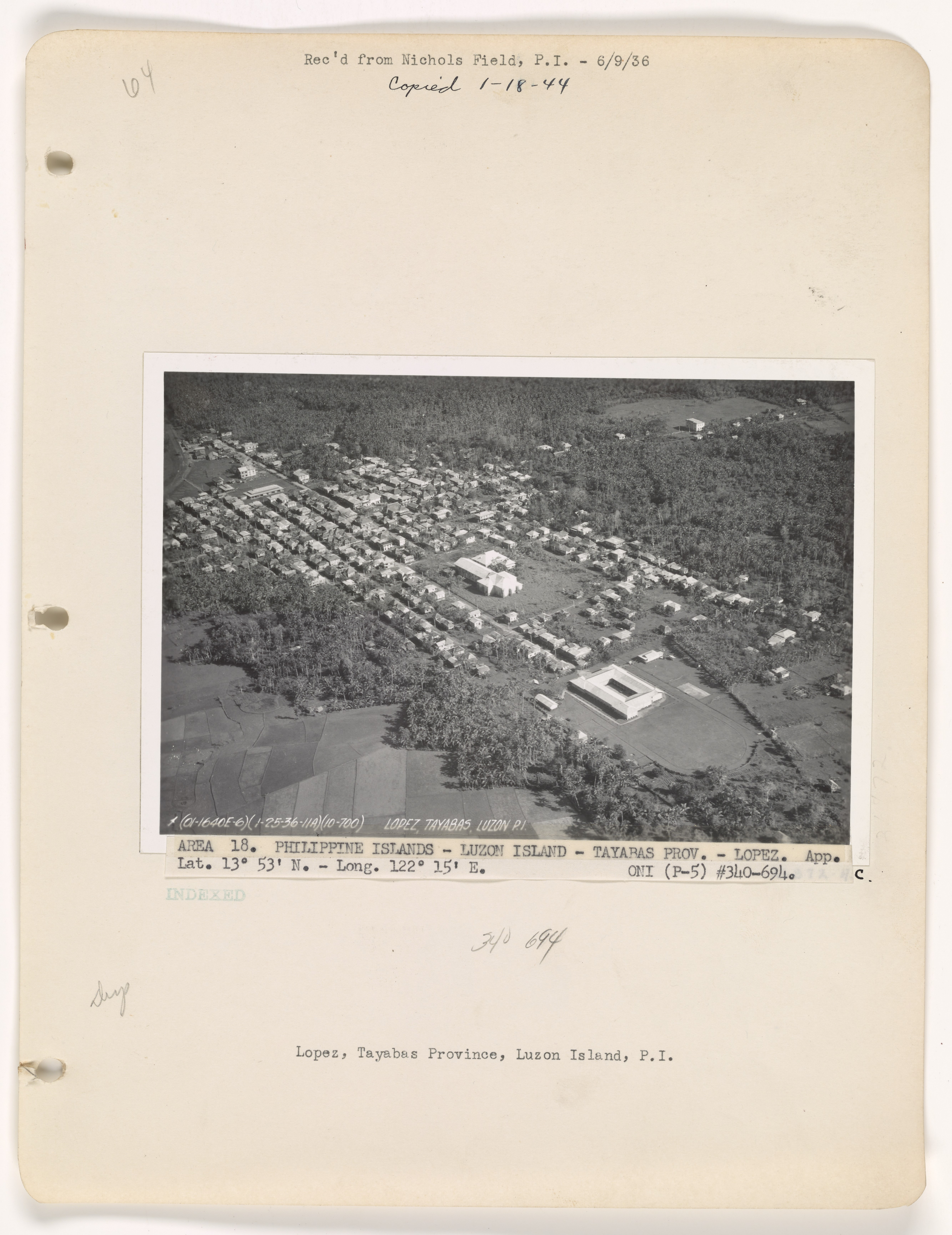
Aerial view of Lopez, circa 1930s

Lopez was originally a settlement called Talolong. The settlement's name was derived from the name of the river that traverses the place.

After 45 years of numerous petitions, Governor General Fernando Norzagaray in Manila approved to separate Talolong from Gumaca on June 30, 1857, during the Governorship of Alcalde Mayor Don Candido Lopez y Diaz. The town was named after him, Lopez. Don Antonio Olivarez was the first gobernadorcillo.

Mayor Nerio O. Ramos was assassinated and the wounding of Vice-Mayor Edgardo Gutierrez on July 22, 1985, by the NPA highlighted the escalating political violence.

On September 27, 2002, the NPA attacked the police station, killing three police officers and injuring another. This attack underscored the prevalence of the rebel group in the municipality.

== Geography ==
Lopez is one of the largest municipalities in the province and has a total land area of 395.1 square kilometers representing 4.53% of the total land area of the province of Quezon. It is located in the southern part of the province, 216 kilometers (134 mi) from Manila, 86 kilometers (53 mi) east from Lucena, and 3 nautical kilometers to Alabat Island.

The terrain generally ranges from 345 to 399 meters (1,132 to 1,309 ft) above sea level with rugged mountain areas. Coastal areas deviate from plain to hilly terrains. Rivers, streams and springs abound throughout the municipality, but the most prominent is the Talolong River.

It is bordered by the municipalities of Catanauan and General Luna on the south, Macalelon on the south-west, Calauag on the north-east, Gumaca on the west, Buenavista and Guinayangan on the east.

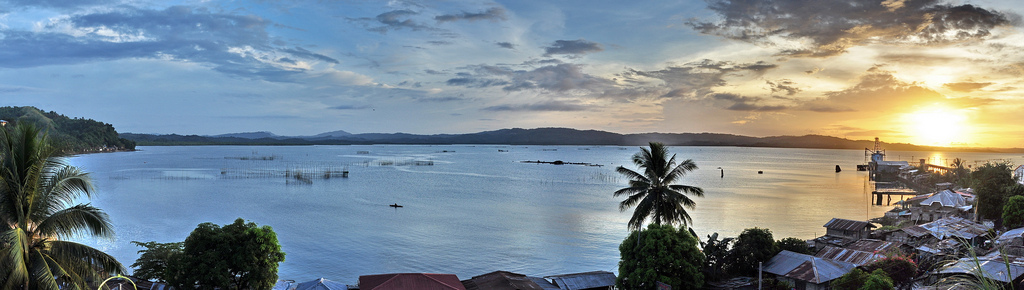
Hondagua Bay

=== Barangays ===
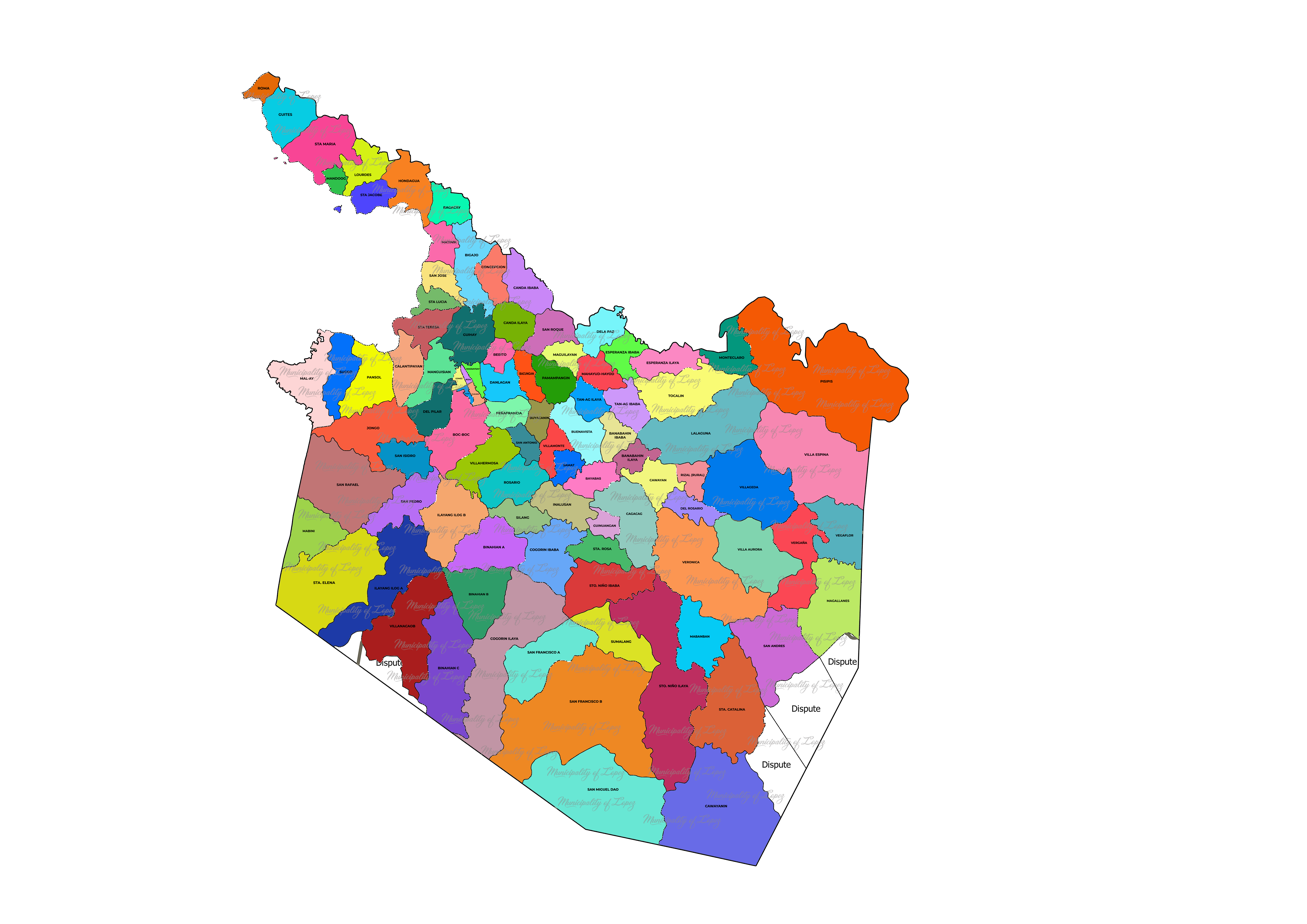
Political map of Lopez, Quezon Province

Lopez is politically subdivided into 95 barangays, as indicated below. Each barangay consists of puroks and some have sitios.

Currently, there are 8 barangays which are classified as urban.

| Barangay | Classification | Population (2020) |
|---|---|---|
| Bacungan | Rural | 636 |
| Bagacay | Rural | 633 |
| Banabahin Ibaba | Rural | 459 |
| Banabahin Ilaya | Rural | 484 |
| Bayabas | Rural | 416 |
| Bebito | Rural | 1,858 |
| Bigajo | Rural | 688 |
| Binahian A | Rural | 415 |
| Binahian B | Rural | 679 |
| Binahian C | Rural | 186 |
| Bocboc | Urban | 2,780 |
| Buenavista | Rural | 379 |
| Burgos | Urban | 2,062 |
| Buyacanin | Rural | 236 |
| Cagacag | Rural | 741 |
| Calantipayan | Rural | 2,135 |
| Canda Ibaba | Rural | 1,267 |
| Canda Ilaya | Rural | 1,406 |
| Cawayan | Rural | 437 |
| Cawayanin | Rural | 568 |
| Cogorin Ibaba | Rural | 787 |
| Cogorin Ilaya | Rural | 759 |
| Concepcion | Rural | 668 |
| Danlagan | Urban | 3,190 |
| De La Paz | Rural | 242 |
| Del Pilar | Rural | 1,478 |
| Del Rosario | Rural | 799 |
| Esperanza Ibaba | Rural | 225 |
| Esperanza Ilaya | Rural | 295 |
| Gomez | Urban | 3,916 |
| Guihay | Rural | 1,638 |
| Guinuangan | Rural | 158 |
| Guites | Rural | 633 |
| Hondagua | Urban | 3,008 |
| Ilayang Ilog A | Rural | 304 |
| Ilayang Ilog B | Rural | 231 |
| Inalusan | Rural | 614 |
| Jongo | Rural | 1,906 |
| Lalaguna | Rural | 2,094 |
| Lourdes | Rural | 328 |
| Mabanban | Rural | 591 |
| Mabini | Rural | 118 |
| Magallanes | Rural | 1,336 |
| Magsaysay | Urban | 4,709 |
| Maguilayan | Rural | 427 |
| Mahayod-Hayod | Rural | 240 |
| Mal-ay | Rural | 1,118 |
| Mandoog | Rural | 294 |
| Manguisian | Rural | 1,414 |
| Matinik | Rural | 967 |
| Monteclaro | Rural | 189 |
| Pamampangin | Rural | 1,012 |
| Pansol | Rural | 2,249 |
| Peñafrancia | Rural | 439 |
| Pisipis | Rural | 803 |
| Rizal | Urban | 3,432 |
| Rizal | Rural | 661 |
| Roma | Rural | 229 |
| Rosario | Rural | 1,092 |
| Samat | Rural | 270 |
| San Andres | Rural | 828 |
| San Antonio | Rural | 239 |
| San Francisco A | Rural | 657 |
| San Francisco B | Rural | 3,093 |
| San Isidro | Rural | 245 |
| San Jose | Rural | 391 |
| San Miguel | Rural | 2,199 |
| San Pedro | Rural | 276 |
| San Rafael | Rural | 362 |
| San Roque | Rural | 741 |
| Santa Catalina | Rural | 1,179 |
| Santa Elena | Rural | 239 |
| Santa Jacobe | Rural | 657 |
| Santa Lucia | Rural | 401 |
| Santa Maria | Rural | 673 |
| Santa Rosa | Rural | 340 |
| Santa Teresa | Rural | 728 |
| Santo Niño Ibaba | Rural | 618 |
| Santo Niño Ilaya | Rural | 1,218 |
| Silang | Rural | 745 |
| Sugod | Rural | 1,336 |
| Sumalang | Rural | 384 |
| Talolong | Urban | 4,241 |
| Tan-ag Ibaba | Rural | 986 |
| Tan-ag Ilaya | Rural | 460 |
| Tocalin | Rural | 237 |
| Vegaflor | Rural | 554 |
| Vergaña | Rural | 979 |
| Veronica | Rural | 1,060 |
| Villa Aurora | Rural | 919 |
| Villa Espina | Rural | 1,026 |
| Villageda | Rural | 746 |
| Villahermosa | Rural | 2,419 |
| Villamonte | Rural | 204 |
| Villanacaob | Rural | 272 |
| Total | | 94,980 |

=== Climate ===
Climate data for Lopez, Quezon
| Month | Jan | Feb | Mar | Apr | May | Jun | Jul | Aug | Sep | Oct | Nov | Dec | Year |
|---|---|---|---|---|---|---|---|---|---|---|---|---|---|
| Mean daily maximum °C (°F) | 26 (79) | 27 (81) | 29 (84) | 33 (91) | 31 (88) | 30 (86) | 29 (84) | 29 (84) | 29 (84) | 29 (84) | 28 (82) | 27 (81) | 29 (84) |
| Mean daily minimum °C (°F) | 22 (72) | 22 (72) | 22 (72) | 23 (73) | 24 (75) | 24 (75) | 24 (75) | 24 (75) | 24 (75) | 24 (75) | 24 (75) | 23 (73) | 23 (74) |
| Average precipitation mm (inches) | 51 (2.0) | 35 (1.4) | 37 (1.5) | 39 (1.5) | 91 (3.6) | 131 (5.2) | 168 (6.6) | 132 (5.2) | 162 (6.4) | 184 (7.2) | 166 (6.5) | 101 (4.0) | 1,297 (51.1) |
| Average rainy days | 13.4 | 10.5 | 11.8 | 12.0 | 19.8 | 24.1 | 26.7 | 25.1 | 25.3 | 23.9 | 21.2 | 17.6 | 231.4 |
Source: Meteoblue

== Demographics ==
Population census of Lopez
| Year | Pop. | ±% p.a. |
|---|---|---|
| 1903 | 8,549 | — |
| 1918 | 13,327 | +3.00% |
| 1939 | 19,948 | +1.94% |
| 1948 | 22,935 | +1.56% |
| 1960 | 31,558 | +2.69% |
| 1970 | 49,021 | +4.50% |
| 1975 | 55,849 | +2.65% |
| 1980 | 58,422 | +0.90% |
| 1990 | 66,037 | +1.23% |
| 1995 | 75,344 | +2.50% |
| 2000 | 78,694 | +0.94% |
| 2007 | 86,660 | +1.34% |
| 2010 | 91,074 | +1.82% |
| 2015 | 95,167 | +0.84% |
| 2020 | 94,657 | −0.11% |
| 2024 | 96,006 | +0.34% |
Source: Philippine Statistics Authority

Settlement areas in the municipality are highly scattered; population concentration is noticeable only within the poblacion, that is, the urban barangays of Burgos, Danlagan, Gomez, Magsaysay, Rizal, San Lorenzo Ruiz (Bocboc) and Talolong as well as the rural barangays of Mal-ay, Sugod, Pansol, Calantipayan, Manguisian, Del Pilar, Bebito, Canda Ibaba and Canda Ilaya which are traversed by the national highway. The rest of rural barangays are reached by other road networks which are accessible during dry and wet season. According to the 2007 census, it had a population of 86,660, a quarter of which are in the urban areas and the rest are in the rural areas. Males outnumbered the females at a ratio of 105.34 to 100. The population grew to 95,167 in the 2015 census.

Aldrin Ludovice Salipande (2022) reports that Inagta Lopenze is spoken in Villa Espina and nearby barangays in Lopez.

=== Religion ===
- Roman Catholic
- Iglesia Ni Cristo
- Seventh-Day Adventist
- Jehovah's Witnesses
- Baptist
- The Church of Jesus Christ of Latter-day saints
- Church of God
- Evangelical
- Word for the World Christian Fellowship
- Islam

==== Churches ====
There are four (4) parishes located in different parts of the municipality under the supervision of the Diocese of Gumaca.

- Our Lady of the Most Holy Rosary Parish (OLMHRP - Lopez Poblacion, est. 1861)

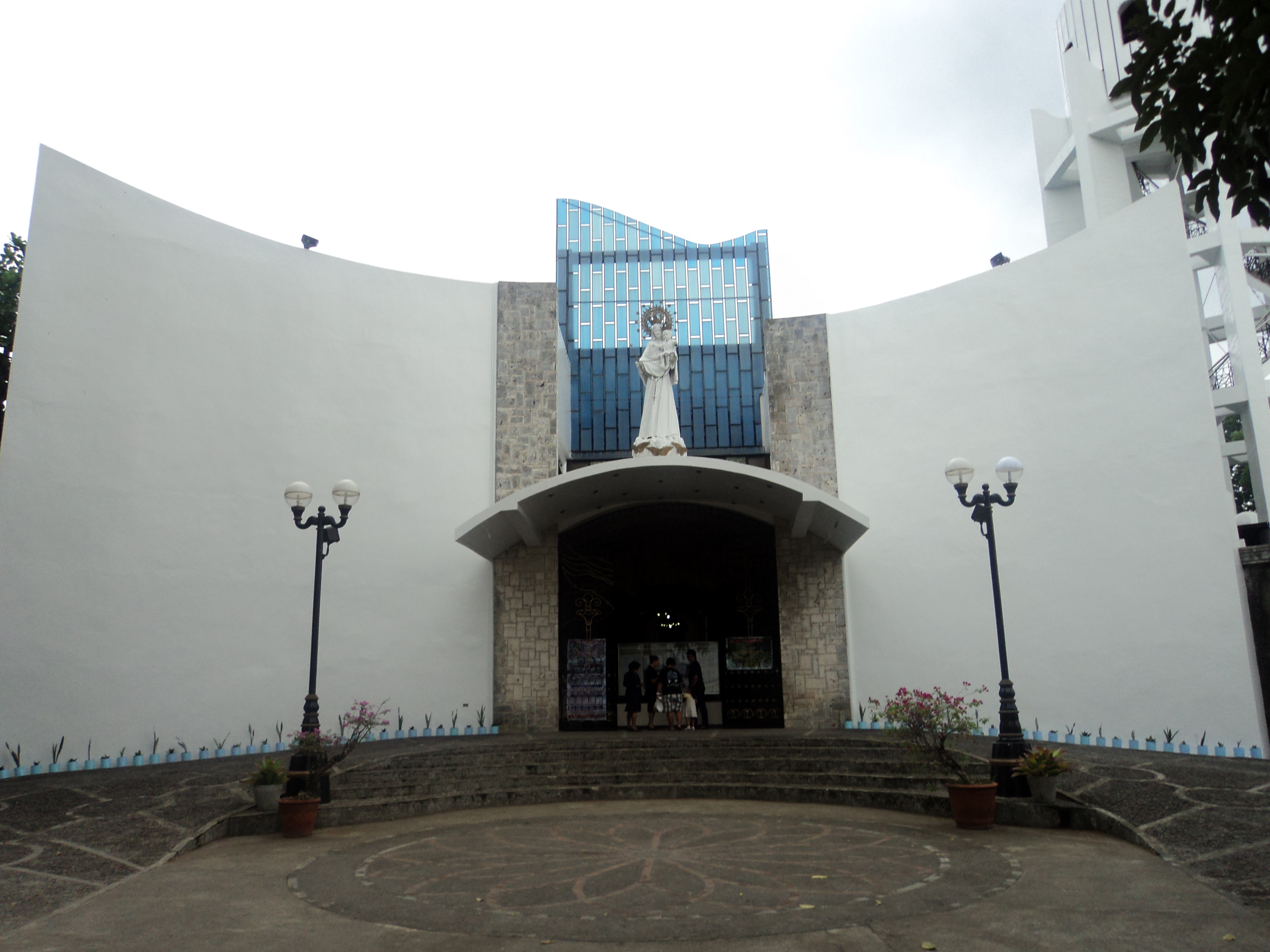
Our Lady of the Most Holy Rosary Parish Church

- San Isidro Labrador Parish (SILP -Hondagua, est. 1961)
- Sacred Heart of Jesus Parish (SHJP - Magsaysay, est. 2008)
- Good Shepherd Parish (GSP - Magallanes, est. 2011)

Other places of worship:

- Angel's Hill Seventh-day Adventist Church
- Church of Jesus Christ of Latter-day Saints
- Gateway of Grace Christian Church
- Iglesia Ni Cristo - Quezon East
- Kingdom Hall Of Jehovah's Witnesses
- Lighthouse Bible Baptist Church
- Masjid - Lopez
- Monasterio de Santa Clara
- Peninsula Bible Baptist Church
- United Church of Christ in the Philippines

== Economy ==
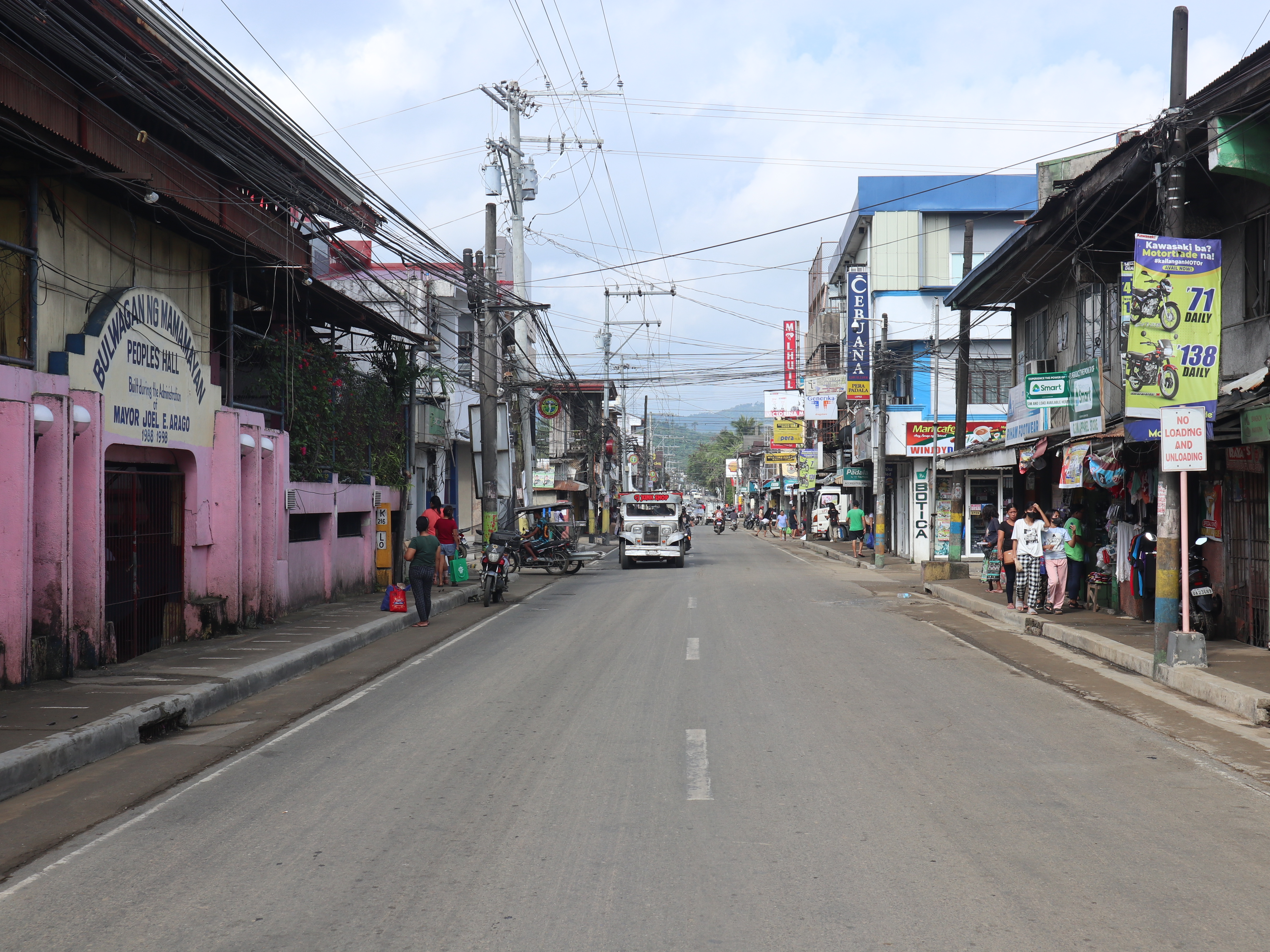
Pan-Philippine Highway traversing Lopez town proper

Lopez had a labor force of 56.99% in 2000 or 44,849. About 9,474 of the employed labor force were engaged in primary industries such as farming and fishing. Its economy is basically engaged in agriculture, crops, poultry and livestock production. Around 17,778.57 hectares (43,931.8 acres) represent 45% of the total land area planted to coconut trees, 2,300 has. are established to rice production, 628 has. to corn harvest. Growing around are natural materials for handicraft such as wild vines, buri, anahaw, tikiw, bamboo, cogon and talahib. Several cottage industries exist in the locality such as bamboo furniture, bolo, baskets, rattan, anahaw and buri fan making, buntal and tikiw. It also has rich fishing grounds in the Lopez Bay area and a number of inland fishponds. Fish, shrimps, prawns, crabs and other sea products are abundant.

Rice is also a major staple crop, the municipality is also a major banana producer in the region. Other crops grown in the municipality are citrus, root crops, vegetables and industrial crops. Majority of the farmers are also raising livestock and poultry.

Poverty incidence of Lopez (%)

Source: Philippine Statistics Authority

=== Tourism ===
- Binutas Cave - also a man-made cave dating back the Japanese Occupation period. Used by the guerrillas as a tactical war maneuver point. Located in Barangay Matinik, just beside the PNR Railways.
- Dumagundong Falls - is a natural waterfall located in Barangay Villa Espina. The falls are known for their raw and untouched beauty. The waterfall's name is derived from the "dagundong," or deep, rushing sound of the water, which can be heard even before you see the cascade. It is a significant cultural site, being home to the Aeta community, and offers a unique blend of nature, heritage, and mystery.
- Gen. Gaudencio Vera's Monument - located in Barangay Lalaguna. Erected to commemorate the heroism and bravery of Gen. Gaudencio Vera during the Japanese period. He was the leader of the guerrilla faction called Vera's Guerrilla Party operating in the Southern Tagalog and Northern Bicol.
- Lalaguna Marshland and Bird Sanctuary - located in Barangay Lalaguna. It covers 130 hectares of freshwater habitat, supporting a variety of bird species including the endemic Philippine Duck, as well as over 120 other bird species that migrate here during winter from other countries. Recognized as an Important Bird Area (IBA) by Birdlife International.
- Pansol Mangrove Walkway - Located at Barangay Pansol and can be accessed from the Maharlika Highway.
- Pulong Niyogan - an islet off the shore of Barangay Hondagua, noted for its unspoiled fine sand beach and varieties of corals and fish.
- Tibag Cave - a man-made cave shelter dating back to World War II. Said to be a hiding place of the guerrillas who fought the Japanese invaders. Located in Barangay Talolong.

== Culture ==
=== Festivals and celebrations ===
- Patronal Town Fiesta, in honor of the town's patroness, Our Lady of the Most Holy Rosary - October 7
- Pamaypayan Festival Day, April 30 (also Kapistahan ng Pamahalaang Bayan, to establish a distinct feast day from the traditionally celebrated patronal feast day every 7 October).
- Foundation Day, June 30, 1857, when Sitio/Visita Talolong became a Town (Pueblo) independent and separate from Gumaca, Quezon (Tayabas)
- Mayflower Festival, or the Flores de Maria, celebrated the whole month of May, culminating with a solemn procession around the poblacion, and on to the night of celebration in dance and songs of praise at the end of the month. The length of the annual procession is said to be one of the longest wherein the head of the line usually arrives back to the church just as the tail is leaving.
- Sedrich Anizar Gigante (Online Anime Influencer known as Maruskeez is from Salumbides Street) he is most known for his humorous Umamusume related videos.

=== Sports ===
Lopez Sports Centre is noted for its cockfighting which is held every Sunday. In 2009, it was visited by Charley Boorman as part of By Any Means 2.

== Government ==
=== Local government ===
Pursuant to the Local Government Code of 1991, the municipality of Lopez is to be composed of a mayor (Punong Bayan), a vice mayor (Pangalawang Punong Bayan) and members (Kagawad) of the legislative branch Sangguniang Bayan alongside a secretary to the said legislature, all of which are elected to a three-year term and are eligible to run for three consecutive terms.

Barangays are also headed by elected officials: Barangay Chairman, Barangay Council, whose members are called Barangay Councilors. The barangays have SK federation which represents the barangay, headed by SK chairperson and whose members are called SK councilors. All officials are also elected every three years.

The current seat of the municipal government is located along the national highway in Barangay Talolong in the poblacion.

=== Public Services ===
- Number of Hospitals
  - Public - 1
  - Private - 1
- Number of Private Health Clinics - 4
- Number of Barangay Health Centers - 31
- Number of Police Personnel - 79
- Number of Fire Personnel - 18
- Communication and Transportation Facilities
  - Number of Postal Offices - 2
  - Number of Mobile Phone Companies - 3
  - Number of Landline Phone Companies - 2
  - Number of Telegraph Stations - 2
  - Number of CATV Companies - 1
  - Number of FM Radio Stations - 2

== Infrastructure ==
=== Communication ===
Lopez is served by landline and mobile phone companies like the Philippine Long Distance Telephone Company (PLDT), Globe, Smart, Sun Cellular, and DITO Telecommunity. Wi-Fi providers like Converge ICT also operate within the city.

=== Public Transportation ===
==== Land Transportation ====
Buses connect Lopez to Parañaque Integrated Terminal Exchange, Lucena Grand Terminal, and Alabang in Muntinlupa, and other parts of Quezon, including Bondoc Peninsula towns. Bus companies such as JAC Liner, Lucena Lines, DLTBCo, A&B Liner, P&O Liner and Raymond Transportation bring passengers to Manila and Lucena back and forth.

A 6-kilometer bypass road was built in order ease the bottleneck along busy Manila South Road-Daang Maharlika Highway.

Lopez also has a wide network of jeepney routes, all emanating from the poblacion (Bayan) and reaching out to the major barangays of the city, as well as nearby towns.

Hundreds of tricycles also roam the streets of the city, bringing passengers right at their point of destination.

A bridge connecting to Alabat Island is currently under construction.

==== Railways ====
The Philippine National Railways (PNR) is on the process of rehabilitating the existing Manila-Bicol railway Line, which includes stops in Quezon province, including PNR Lopez station and PNR Hondagua station.

==== Sea Transport ====
The port of Hondagua is located in Lopez Bay, which faces the Pacific Ocean.

It is used for loading copra and discharging grain and oil and is accessible via the paved provincial road connecting the Hondagua road and a rough causeway leading to the port.

== Healthcare ==
Lopez has a private and public hospital. Both types of institutions are considered to provide the same standard of healthcare and services, differing mainly with the medical and diagnostic facilities.

Here are the hospitals available in the city:

- Lopez Saint Jude General Hospital
- Magsaysay Memorial District Hospital

== Education ==
Lopez is often referred to as the educational center of southern Quezon due to the concentration of academic institutions in the municipality. A wide range of public and private schools operate in the town, offering programs from the elementary and secondary levels to vocational, diploma, baccalaureate degree and graduate programs. These institutions serve not only residents of Lopez but also students from neighboring municipalities across the Bondoc Peninsula and, in some cases, even from parts of the Bicol Region.

There are two schools district offices which govern all educational institutions within the municipality. They oversee the management and operations of all private and public, from primary to secondary schools. These are the Lopez East Schools District, and Lopez West Schools District.

=== Primary and elementary schools ===
- Alat-alatin Elementary School
- Banabahin Elementary School
- Beata Sai Integrated School
- Bebito Elementary School
- Binahian A Elementary School
- Binahian B Elementary School
- Cagacag Elementary School
- Canda Ibaba Elementary School
- Canda Ilaya Elementary School
- Cawayanin Elementary School
- Cogorin Ibaba Elementary School
- Cogorin Ilaya Elementary School
- Concepcion Elementary School
- Don Emilio Salumbides Elementary School
- Don Gregorio C. Yumul Sr. Elementary School
- Don Marcos Villegas Sr. Elementary School
- Don Mariano L. Barrameda Elementary School
- Don Mateo Lopez Elementary School
- Don Rodolfo F. Agra Elementary School
- Escuela Dela Consorcia Elementary School
- Esperanza Ibaba Elementary School
- Gomez Elementary School
- Guihay Elementary School
- Guites Elementary School
- Hondagua Elementary School
- Ilayang Ilog A Elementary School
- Ilayang Ilog B Elementary School
- Inalusan Elementary School
- Institute of Christian Educators Baptist Education System
- Jongo Elementary School
- Lalaguna I Elementary School
- Lalaguna Rural Academy
- Lopez Adventist Elementary School
- Lopez Quezon Multipurpose Cooperative Academy
- Lopez West Elementary School
- Lourdes Elementary School
- Mabanban Elementary School
- Magallanes Elementary School
- Matinik Elementary School
- Most Holy Rosary Parochial School
- New Jerusalem School
- Pamampangin Elementary School
- Pansol Elementary School
- Pisipis Elementary School
- Rosario Elementary School
- Samat Elementary School
- San Andres Elementary School
- San Francisco B Elementary School
- San Francisco B (Culong) Elementary School
- San Miguel Dao I Elementary School
- San Miguel Dao II Elementary School
- San Rafael Elementary School
- Santa Elena Elementary School
- Sta. Catalina Elementary School
- Sto. Niño Elementary School
- Sumalang Elementary School
- Talolong Elementary School
- Tan-Ag Elementary School
- Vegaflor Elementary School
- Vergaña Elementary School
- Veronica Elementary School
- VIlla Aurora Elementary School
- VIllaespina Elementary School
- Villageda Elementary School
- Villahermosa Elementary School
- Villaminda Elementary School

=== Secondary schools ===
- Aceba Systems Technology Institute
- Cogorin Ibaba National High School
- Dao National High School
- Eastern Tayabas College
- Guites National High School
- Hondagua National High School
- Hondagua Port High School
- Ilayang Ilog A National High School
- Jongo National High School
- Lalaguna Rural Academy
- Lopez National Comprehensive High School
- Magallanes National High School
- Most Holy Rosary Parochial School
- Pamampangin National High School
- Pisipis National High School
- San Francisco B National High School
- Sta. Catalina National High School
- Sto. Nino Ilaya National High School
- Veronica National High School

=== Technical and vocational schools ===
- Keystone Technical Institute
- Lopez Municipal Training Center
- Lopez Quezon Multipurpose Cooperative Academy
- Mission Care International School of Caregiver

=== Higher educational institution ===
- Laguna State Polytechnic University Lopez satellite campus
- Philippine Normal University South Luzon campus
- Polytechnic University of the Philippines Lopez campus
- Technological University of the Philippines Quezon campus

== Notable personalities ==
- Denok Miranda, former PBA player and coach in the UAAP
- Desiree del Valle – actress
- Emilio Marquez – former bishop of the Roman Catholic Diocese of Lucena, first Bishop of Gumaca
- Gaudencio Vera – politician; former 2nd district representative and guerrilla leader.
