= Gaudencio Vera =

Filipino politician and guerilla leader

The Honorable Gaudencio Vera
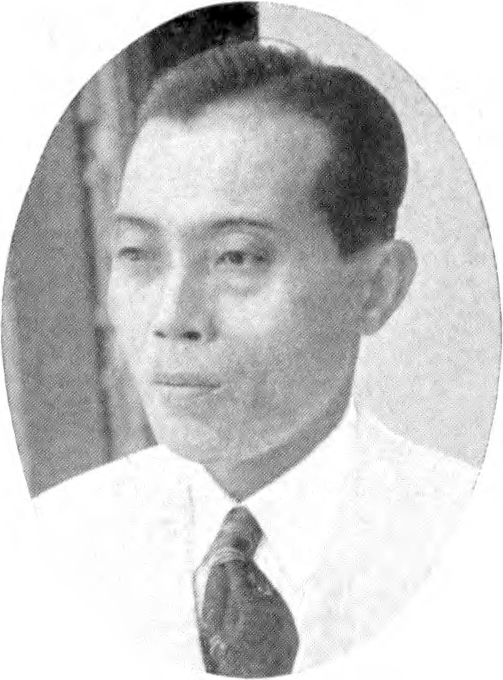
- Vera official portrait during the 2nd Congress.

Member of the House of Representatives from Quezon's 2nd district
- In office December 30, 1949 – December 30, 1953
- Preceded by: Tomás Morató
- Succeeded by: León M. Guinto Jr.

Personal details
- Born: September 17, 1905 Lopez, Tayabas, Philippine Islands
- Died: December 21, 1979 (aged 74) Lopez, Quezon, Philippines
- Party: Liberal (1949–1953)
- Spouses: Rosario Orbe Herras (died 1965); Lucena Saavedra (died); Fely Vera (died)
- Children: 3
- Occupation: Politician

Military service
- Allegiance: Philippines; United States
- Branch/service: Recognized Guerrilla Unit; Philippine Scouts (United States Army)
- Years of service: 1937–1945
- Rank: Lieutenant General
- Unit: Philippine Scouts
- Commands: Vera’s Tayabas Guerrilla Battalion Forces (VTGBF)
- Battles/wars: World War II: Philippine Resistance (1941–45); Philippines Campaign (1944–45)

Gaudencio Verdadero Vera (September 17, 1905 – December 21, 1979) was a Filipino statesman and guerilla leader. He was born to Felipe Vera of Magarao, Camarines Sur and Hilaria Verdadero of Lopez, Quezon. He has three brothers namely Ildefonso, Dioscoro and Juan Vera.

He travelled to Manila in search of greener pastures. He was successfully hired by Pres. Manuel L. Quezon to work with the Quezon Family before the World War II broke-out in 1941.

== Early life and education ==
His primary learning was at Lopez Elementary School. He would later become the caretaker of Pres. Quezon's horses and their family's "kalesa". With Quezon as his benefactor, he continued his high school studies at Tondo High School in Manila. He was unable to finish his senior year, because of the upcoming Japanese invasions of the Philippines during World War II.

== Career ==
His military service started at age 32 as a First Staff Sergeant in the Philippine Scouts and trained as an intelligence officer at Fort Santiago, Intramuros, under the U.S. War Department.

At Pres. Quezon's behest and with the help of Teniente del Barrio Rufino Verdadero, Vera mobilized, organized and led the guerilla movement in South-eastern Luzon areas of Quezon province against the Japanese forces by forming “Voluntario”, which is the predecessor of Vera’s Tayabas Guerrilla Battalion Forces (VTGBF). Among his trusted officers was Capt. Herminio O. Herras, a brave Philippine Army intelligence officer who commanded Company “B” under Vera.

Barangay Lalaguna in Lopez, Quezon became the headquarters of Vera's Tayabas Guerrilla under his command.

In 1942, the United States Army Forces in the Far East, under Gen. Douglas MacArthur, recognized him as Lieutenant General.

Vera is known as the librerator of Lopez, Hondagua, Alabat, Gumaca, Guinayangan, and neighboring towns in Quezon, as well as parts of Camarines Norte and Sur between 1942-1945.

In November 1944, MacArthur sent him a personal message:

TO VERA FROM GEN. MACARTHUR—CONGRATULATIONS STOP GOOD WORK STOP CONTINUE SABOTAGE ACTIVITIES.

That same month, MacArthur tasked Vera with building an airstrip at Abuyon, San Narciso, Tayabas, to aid American landings and cut off Japanese forces in Bicol.

By January 9, 1945, his 894-strong battalion was formally authorized under his command, with his rank adjusted to Lieutenant Colonel (ASN-28770).
