= Manide language =

Austronesian language spoken in the Philippines

Manide
- Camarines Norte Agta
- Native to: Philippines
- Region: Camarines Norte & Quezon, Luzon
- Native speakers: 3,800 (2010)
- Language family: Austronesian: Malayo-Polynesian; Philippine?; Manide–Alabat; Manide

Language codes
- ISO 639-3: abd
- Glottolog: cama1250
- ELP: Camarines Norte Agta

Manide is a Philippine language spoken throughout the province of Camarines Norte in Bicol region and near the eastern edge of Quezon in Southern Tagalog of southern Luzon in the Philippines. Manide is spoken by nearly 4,000 Negrito people, most of whom reside in the towns of Labo, Jose Panganiban, and Paracale.

== History ==
Between 1903 and 1924, John M. Garvan (1963) visited Negrito Filipino communities in the region of Luzon and recorded the name Manide.

Many of the Manide population's children still grow up speaking Manide.

== Classification ==
Manide is the most divergent out of the three other Negrito languages in Southern Luzon, namely Inagta Alabat, Inagta Rinconada, and Inagta Partido (although Inagta Rinconada and Inagta Partido belong to the Bikol subgroup and not the Manide-Alabat subgroup). In a survey of 1000 lexical items, 285 appeared to be unique, including new coinages which are forms that experienced semantic and or phonological shifts over time. In comparison, other Negrito languages such as Batak, Inagta Rinconada/Partido, Mamanwa, or Inati have a cognate rate of over 90% with neighboring non-Negrito languages.

The language genetically closest to Manide is the Inagta Alabat language. According to a handful of words remembered by a group self-identifying as Katabangan on the Bondoc Peninsula, as reported by Zubiri, that language may have also been related to Manide and Inagta Alabat.

== Distribution ==
Lobel (2010) shows the separation of towns with Manide populations.

- Camarines Norte
  - Basud – 2 communities, 175 speakers
  - Labo – 9 communities, 1,542 speakers
  - Jose Panganiban – 3 communities, 568 speakers
  - Paracale – 4 communities, 581 speakers
  - Santa Elena – 1 community, 110 speakers
  - Capalonga – 2 communities, 245 speakers
  - San Lorenzo Ruiz – 1 community, 45 speakers
- Quezon
  - Calauag – 1 community
  - Lopez – 1 community
- Camarines Sur
  - Ragay – 1 community, 200 speakers
  - Lupi – 1 community, 197 speakers

== Phonology ==
Consonants
		Labial	Alveolar	Dorsal	Glottal
Nasal		m	n	ŋ	
Plosive	voiceless	p	t	k	ʔ
Plosive	voiced	b	d	g	
Fricative			s		h
Lateral			l		
Trill			r		
Glide		w		j	

Vowels
	Front	Back
Close	i	u
Mid	e ([ɛ])	o
Open	a	

== Historical reflexes ==
Reflexes are words, sounds, or writing systems which are derived from previous, older elements or systems.

=== Reflex of PMP *q ===
PMP *q is reflected in Manide as /ʔ/. The glottal stop may combine with other consonants in cluster, i.e. in the sequence /ʔC/ and /Cʔ/, e.g. bag-áng /bagʔáŋ/ 'mouth'.

=== Reflex of PMP *R ===
The reflex of PMP *R in Manide is /g/. The reflex most likely comes from borrowed items in Tagalog. For example, Manide be-gí /beʔgí/ 'new' is a reflex of Proto-Philippine *baqəRú with the same meaning.

=== Reflex of PMP *s ===
Normally, the reflex of PMP *s is /s/, but in some cases that has shifted to /h/ instead.

=== Reflex of PMP *d, *j, and *z ===
The reflexes of Proto-Malayo-Polynesian *d, *j, and *z are all /d/, with some exceptions for *j and *z.

An example for *j: Manide ngádun /ŋádun/ 'name' < PPH *ŋájan
An example for *d: Manide dakép /dakép/ 'catch, capture' < PPH *dakə́p
An example for *z: Manide tudî /tudíʔ/ 'teach' < PMP *tuzuq 'point'

=== Reflexes of PMP *ə. ===
The reflexes of PMP *ə are /a e i u/. /e/ is the only inherited reflex of PMP *ə, with /a i u/ being borrow reflexes.

== Verb morphology ==
Manide is a reduced-focus language because it primarily uses mag- for the actor focus and -an for the location focus, while -en takes place of the functions from Proto Malayo Polynesian *-ən and *i-, thus marking object focus. There are two present forms, with the first being possessive. The second present form is used for habitual functions. In Southern Luzon, Manide is the only language that uses CVC reduplication.

Verb Conjunctions
	AF	OF/OF2	LF
Infinitive	mag-	-en	-an
Past	nag-	i-, pi-	i-...-an, pi-...-an
Present Progressive	CVC-	ig-CVC-	ig-CVC-...-an
Present Habitual, Near Future	pa-	ipa-CVC-	CVC-...-an
Future	nig-	ig-, pig-	ig-...-an
Imperative	<um>,Ø	-en	-an
Negative Imperative	mag-, ()g-	(i)g-...-a	(i)g-...-i
Past Subjective	(i)g-	-a, pa-...-a	-i, pa-...-i
Past Negative	pa-	igpa-	?

== Pronouns ==
Pronouns in Manide make the same contrasts as in other Philippine languages.

Pronouns
	TOP	NOM	GEN	OBL
1SG	há-ku	=ek	=ku	(di) da-kú
2SG	hiká	=ka	=mu	(di) diká
3SG	hiyú	hiyú	adiyú, =ye	(di) diyú
1EX	kamí	=kamí	=mì	(di) dikamí
1IN	kitá	=kitá	=tà	(di) dikitá
1IN.PL	(kitáhan)†	(kitáhan)	(=tahan)	(di dikitáhan)
2PL	kamú	=kamú	=yi	(di) dikamú
3PL	hidú††	hidú	adidú	(di) didú

== Vowel shifts ==
Vowel shifts are systematic sound changes in the pronunciation of vowel sounds. In Manide, there are vowel shifts following voiced stops /b d g/ and glides /w y/. Low vowel fronting, back vowel fronting, and low vowel backing are all present in Manide.

Fronting refers to a change in the articulation of a vowel with shifts to vowels further forward in the mouth. (i.e., the position of the highest point of the tongue during its pronunciation).

=== Low vowel fronting ===
Low vowel fronting is the shift of *a to a front vowel such as /e/. Fronting may occur due to assimilation to nearby sounds, or it may form independently. It is part of a feature among many Negrito Filipino languages from northern Luzon to Manide.

=== Back vowel fronting ===
Back vowel fronting is the change of the vowel *u to /i/. It is related to low vowel fronting as back vowel fronting happens after /b d g/, but there are few occurrences after *b.

Manide shows 16 different forms of back vowel fronting, which generally happens after *t and *l.

=== Low vowel backing ===
In Manide, low vowel backing is the shift from *a to /u/. Low vowel backing is unique to Manide, as it is not known to occur in any other language of the Philippines. Ten occurrences of low vowel backing of the shift *a to /u/ have been recorded.

== Case markers ==
Case markers in Manide are similar to those of other Philippine languages. The case markers show the relationships of nouns and noun phrases to a verb. The most common situations are genitive, nominative, and oblique. Something very unusual is that Manide uses the same case markers for personal names just as used with common nouns. There are no 'personal' case markers in Manide for in the plural form, only the singular form.

Case Markers in Manide
	Common	Personal (Singular)
NOM	hu (~'h)	hu
GEN	nu (~'n)	nu
OBL	di (~'d)	di
