= Inagta Alabat language =

Language

Inagta Alabat
- Alabat Island Agta
- Native to: Philippines
- Region: Quezon
- Ethnicity: spoken by 5–20% (2020)
- Native speakers: 10 (2019)
- Language family: Austronesian: Malayo-Polynesian; Philippine?; ?; Manide–Alabat; Inagta Alabat
- Dialects: Inagta Lopez

Language codes
- ISO 639-3: dul
- Glottolog: alab1246
- ELP: Inagta Alabat

Inagta Alabat (Alabat Island Agta) or Ayta Kadi is a Philippine Negrito language spoken in central Alabat Island, Philippines. Its speakers began arriving on the island in the 1970s but originated from Villa Espina in Lopez, with earlier settlements in Gumaca and perhaps other towns.

Predating the Agta on Alabat Island were communities of individuals self-identifying as "dumagat" but who now only speak Tagalog as a native language. Less than a dozen individuals can still speak the Inagta Alabat language whether on Alabat Island, where it is being lost in favor of Tagalog, or in Lopez, where it is being replaced by the language of the Manide who have migrated to the area in large numbers and intermarried with the Agta, and also replaced by Tagalog.

Those Agta who can still speak the Inagta language in Lopez speak the same language as the Agta who have migrated to Alabat over the past 50 years. Other Agta in Lopez either speak only Manide, or a mixture of Manide and Inagta Alabat-Lopez.

== Classification ==
Inagta Alabat (Alabat Island Agta) and Ayta Kadi are the same language, though the term "Ayta Kadi" is the name recognized by the Komisyon ng Wikang Filipino (Commission on the Filipino Language). The term "Inagta Alabat" refers to the language of the Agta people who live in the Alabat Island and neighboring areas of Quezon province. Ayta Kadi is the language spoken by the Ayta Kadi group living in the towns of Alabat, Catanauan, and Lopez in the province of Quezon; and in Barangay Putingkahoy in the town of Rosario in the province of Batangas.

Since Tagalog is the lingua franca in Quezon, it is also the language spoken more by the Áyta Kadí than their native language. In fact, most Áyta Kadí youth have not learned their language and have instead become accustomed to using Tagalog (Filipino) and English, which are the languages of instruction in school. UNESCO classified the language as "critically endangered".

Inagta Alabat forms a subgroup with Manide. The extinct Katabangan may have also been related.

== Lexicon ==
The Inagta Alabat language has similarities with other Philippine languages over which it has 16 consonants and four vowels. It also has adverbial particles which add different meanings to a given clause similar to other Philippine languages.

Below are selected words from Inagta Lopenze, a dialect of the Inagta Alabat language, from Salipande (2022):

Gloss	Inagta Lopenze
afternoon	álem
pig	bébuy
sun, day	degéw
fruit	geʔén
lightning	keldét
to chew	ŋásŋas
butterfly	kalibaŋbáŋ
crocodile	beʔéye
moon	bílan
cloud	dagʔúm
evening, night	diyúm
rattan	uwáy
endonym	agtáʔ
to eat	káʔun
river	sáyug
breast	súsu
tree	káhew
house	beléy
give	awéy
fire	hapúy
navel	púsed
person	táwu
tooth	ŋépen
leg	sukáb
blind	bulég
to cry	íbil
blood	digíʔ
worm	bukbúk

== Sample text ==
Below is a sample text along with English translation by Rosie Susutin Barreno of the Inagta Alabat text Hu he-new pat hu degew or "The Wind and the Sun":

He-sâ a degéw, igtatálu hu hé-new pat hu degéw. Nagkádè hu hé-new, "Ha-kú hu malakas dekitâ a dawhá." Nagtubág hu degéw, "Ukún!"...

One day, the wind and the sun were arguing. The wind said, "I am the stronger of the two of us." The sun answered, "No!"...

Rosie Susutin Barreno, born in 1967, was the Alabat Agta chieftain until 2014. She was also an author having published the story of "The Wind and the Sun" into English and created an unpublished Tagalog version of the story. Barreno expressed her concern for the lack of awareness by the "non-black Filipinos" to the Inagta Alabat people. She said in her recording in March 2011, in the Inagta Alabat language:

Halíd kamî an, pigpapansín nu mā putî de-dû de Alabat. Ay, kumánà, ay, bagá, ukún de. Gawâ nu pag igá yang nu mā kailángan dekamî, sákà kamí yang nipansín, péru pag wayâ de, ay, ukún kamí de pig-iintindí...

Back then, the non-black Filipinos in Alabat would pay attention to us. Oh, nowadays, well, basically, not anymore. For the reason that only when someone needs something from us, only then do they notice us, but when they don’t need anything from us anymore, oh, they don’t think about us...

She died on November 17, 2014, due to breast cancer.
