= Manila Railway D class =

Filipino steam locomotive introduced in 1909

Manila Railway 37 class Manila Railroad D Class
Type and origin
- Power type: Steam
- Designer: Horace L. Higgins
- Builder: Kerr, Stuart and Company
- Serial number: 965-972
- Build date: 1907
Specifications
- Configuration
  - Whyte: 4-6-0
  - UIC: 2C d2
- Gauge: 3 ft 6 in (1,067 mm)
- Driver dia.: 60 in (1,500 mm)
- Wheelbase: 42 ft 3 in (12.88 m)
  - Engine: 28 ft 0 in (8.53 m)
  - Drivers: 11 ft 6 in (3.51 m)
- Adhesive weight: 70,560 lb (32.01 t; 31.50 long tons)
- Loco weight: 40 long tons 50 cwt (43.2 t; 95,200 lb)
- Tender weight: 38 long tons (39 t; 85,000 lb)
- Total weight: 78 long tons 50 cwt (81.8 t; 180,300 lb)
- Fuel type: Coal
- Water cap.: 3,000 US gal (11,000 L)
- Firebox
  - Type
  - Grate area: 16.5 sq ft (1.53 m^{2})
- Boiler
  - Type: Fire-tube boiler
- Boiler pressure: 180 psi (1,200 kPa)
- Heating surface
  - Firebox: 107 sq ft (9.9 m^{2})
  - Total surface
- Valve gear: Walschaerts
Performance figures
- Tractive effort: 18,770 lbf (83.5 kN)
Career
- Operators: Manila Railway; Manila Railroad
- Number in class: 8
- Numbers: 37–44
- Locale: Metro Manila; Central Luzon; Ilocos Region
- Delivered: 1906
- First run: 1909
- Last run: 1956
- Preserved: 0
- Disposition: All scrapped

The Manila Railway 37 class, later classified as the Manila Railroad D class, were eight 4-6-0 Ten-wheeler steam locomotives built by Kerr, Stuart and Company.

== Background ==
The 37 class follows the numbering of the Manila Railway Dagupan class, which were the first locomotives built for mainline service in Central Luzon and the Ilocos Region. They were built by two Glasgow-based manufacturers. These tank locomotives were numbered from 1 to 30, with no. 17 Urdaneta surviving to the present day. In 1905, the Manila Railway ordered the Cabanatuan class tank locomotives from another Scottish manufacturer named Kerr, Stuart and Company. One unit also survived like the Dagupan class as a static display in front of Tutuban station.

In 1906, general manager Horace L. Higgins ordered the Manila Railway 100 class. These five 4-4-2 Atlantics were the first tender locomotives in Philippine service. It would also serve the first Baguio Special in 1909, which was a mixed bus-train service to Baguio in Benguet via Damortis station in Rosario, La Union.

== Design ==
The 37 class shared a common design traced to the 100 class. Its only significant difference with the NBL-built class was its wheel arrangement. It was also shorter by 1 in (25 mm).

== Service ==
Little information was provided by the Manila Railway and the succeeding Manila Railroad regarding the services the 37 class operated. Sometime in the 1920s however, it was used as a sugarcane hauling freight locomotive by the succeeding Manila Railroad alongside the 100 class. Two units managed to survive until the late 1940s. F. Unson, then the Superintendent of the Manila Railroad's Mechanical Department, reclassified the surviving locomotives as the D class. The class was later decommissioned by around 1956 and then scrapped.

=== Legacy ===
The Manila Railroad 45 class was built as a successor to the 37 class. Built by American short-line rolling stock manufacturer H.K. Porter, Inc. in 1919, the 45 class had the same wheel arrangement as the 37 class. The first batch also sported a similar cab style, although it had more accessories than its predecessor. This class enjoyed service with Manila Railroad as well as the succeeding Philippine National Railways until 1989, when it was later decommissioned and scrapped.
