= Manila Railroad 200 class =

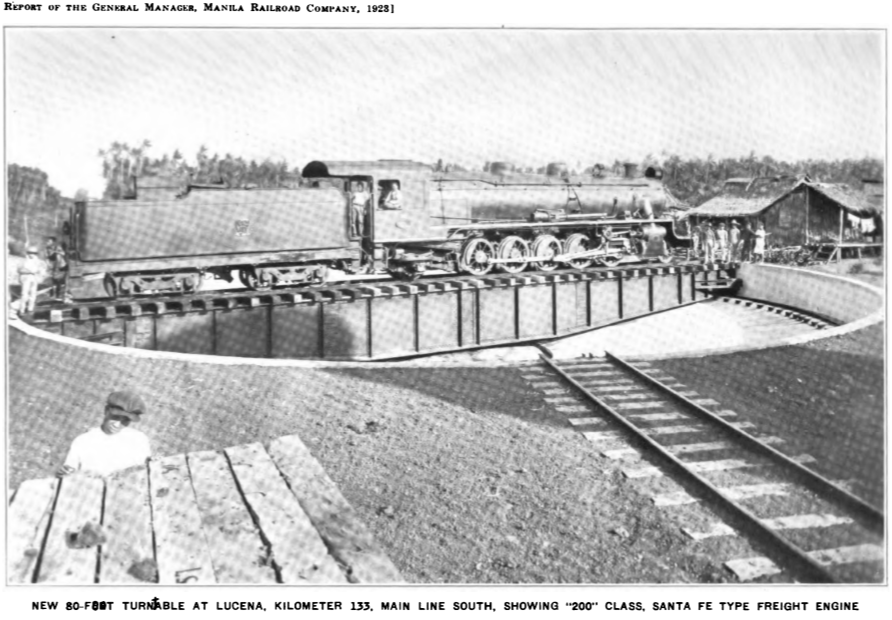
- A 200 class in Lucena in 1922. It was then the terminus of the South Main Line until the extension to Albay was opened in 1938.
Type and origin
- Power type: Steam
- Designer: American Locomotive Company; H.K. Porter, Inc.
- Builder: American Locomotive Company (Brooks Plant)
- Order number: 62739-48
- Build date: 1921-22
- Total produced: 10
Specifications
- Configuration
  - Whyte: 2-10-2
  - UIC: 1'E1'h3G
- Gauge: 3 ft 6 in (1,067 mm)
- Wheelbase
  - Engine: 34.58 ft (10.54 m)
  - Drivers: 18.33 ft (5.59 m)
- Length: 80 ft (24 m) with tender
- Adhesive weight: 148,500 lb (67,400 kg)
- Loco weight: 188,000 lb (85,000 kg)
- Tender weight: 155,000 lb (70,000 kg) (Note: On rebuilt units fitted with larger tenders from the 100 class after 1949.)
- Total weight: 343,000 lb (156,000 kg)
- Tender type: Four-axle tender
- Fuel type: Oil, coal
- Fuel capacity: 6,000 US gal (23,000 L) oil or 5.5 t (12,000 lb) coal 18,000 lb (8,200 kg)
- Water cap.: 5,000 US gal (19,000 L)
- Firebox
  - Type: Standard fire-tube firebox
  - Grate area: 35 sq ft (3.3 m^{2})
- Boiler pressure: 180 psi (1,200 kPa)
- Heating surface
  - Firebox: 176 sq ft (16.4 m^{2})
  - Tubes: 416 sq ft (38.6 m^{2})
  - Flues: 498 sq ft (46.3 m^{2})
  - Tubes and flues: 914 sq ft (84.9 m^{2})
  - Total surface
- Superheater
  - Type: Fire-tube
  - Heating area: 493 sq ft (45.8 m^{2})
- Cylinders: 3
- Cylinder size: 130.9 cu ft (3.71 m^{3})
- Valve gear: Walschaerts
- Valve type: Piston valves
- Couplers: Buffers and chain with Link and pin couplers (1922–45); Link and pin with Transitional Janney coupler
Performance figures
- Maximum speed: 53 mph (85 km/h)
- Power output: 1,944 hp (1,450 kW)
- Tractive effort: 53,550 lbf (238.2 kN)
- Factor of adh.: 2.77
Career
- Operators: Manila Railroad Company
- Number in class: 10
- Numbers: 201-210
- Nicknames: Santa Fes
- Locale: South Main Line, Luzon
- Delivered: 1921-22
- First run: 1922
- Withdrawn: c. 1960
- Preserved: 0
- Scrapped: 1945, c. 1957–1970s
- Disposition: Scrapped

The Manila Railroad 200 class were 2-10-2 Santa Fe steam locomotives operated by the Manila Railroad Company (MRR), predecessor of the Philippine National Railways. They were built alongside the 4-8-2 Mountain-type 170 class by the American Locomotive Company at its Brooks facility between 1921 and 1922. During its service at the MRR, it carried heavy freight trains on the South Main Line between Manila and the Bicol Region.

Four units managed to survive World War II. These locomotives were ultimately scrapped without a single unit preserved like all of the Manila Railroad's tender locomotives.

== Background ==
The Manila Railway Company (MRC) purchased and operated tank locomotives for its fleet until 1906, when they purchased five Manila Railway 100 class 4-4-2 locomotives for the Baguio Special, an express train bound for Baguio via Dagupan station. After the company was renamed into the Manila Railroad in 1909, the first American-built locomotives were purchased from the American Locomotive Company (Alco) and arrived in 1912. Ten of these were the 110 class 4-6-0 and another ten were 130 class 2-8-0 locomotives.

By 1917, the Insular Government took over the remaining Manila Railway operations in Manila and merged it into the Manila Railroad. The success of Manila Railroad 45 class in the early 1920s the urged the government to purchase newer and larger locomotives based around H.K. Porter, Inc.'s acclaimed designs. These would replace its aging fleet of mostly tank locomotives, as well as the Manila Railroad 160 class Meyer locomotives, the latter were seen as slow, inefficient, and controversial during their time.

Twenty new locomotives were purchased from Alco, ten being a 2-10-2 Santa Fe-type heavy freight locomotives and another ten being a 4-8-2 Mountain type for passenger use. The Santa Fe's were numbered the 200 class to the while the Mountain types were numbered the 170 class. While the first 20 Alco locomotives were built in the former Rogers Locomotive and Machine Works facility in New Jersey, these were built in the former Brooks Locomotive Works facility in Buffalo, New York. The transfer of facilities was made because the Brooks plant was more capable of building larger locomotives.

== Design ==
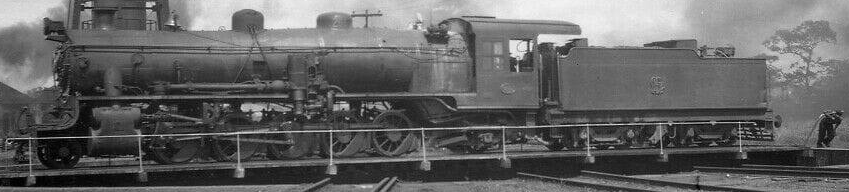
A Manila Railroad 200 class in its full length in Tutuban, c. 1930s. The influence of Porter's designs is most visible on the cab.

The 200 class was the largest and heaviest locomotive class that entered Philippine service. With a four-axle tender, a 200 class was 80 ft (24 m) long and weighed 343,500 pounds (155,800 kg; 155.8 t). Each locomotive was 50 percent heavier and twice longer than the 2-6-0+0-6-2 Kitson Meyer locomotives it replaced. Despite being its flagship class, the 200 class was still one of the smallest tender locomotives of this wheel arrangement. Santa Fes in other national railroads such as the USRA Light Santa Fe easily weighed above 100 metric tons (220,000 lb) without a tender and would rather not fit on the turntables built by the Manila Railroad.

According to Alco, it was built with almost the same exact specifications as the Mountain-type 170 class, except it had a different weight distribution and driver diameter, and was also heavier by 5,000 pounds (2,300 kg; 2.3 t). It also had the biggest cylinders of any non-articulated locomotive of the era that ran on narrow-gauge lines. It was not until 1927 when the so-called Henschel Giants of the South African Railways featured a wider cylinder. However, it had relatively small boilers and grates compared to the other Santa Fes, which would then contribute to its smaller size and weight. The locomotives were fitted with a Walschaerts valve gear similar to all steam locomotives during this era.

The overall design also heavily resembles the Manila Railroad 45 class locomotives designed by Porter, particularly the second batch numbered 55–64 introduced a year before owing to that design's enjoyed popularity among MRR's railroad engineers and maintenance crew.

== Service ==
These locomotives were used on freight services on the South Main Line. Initially the line ended near Lucena, Quezon. Due to the size of the locomotives, new 80 ft (24 m) railway turntables were constructed to accommodate them. The locomotives would see extended freight service to Bicol with the opening of the Lucena–Port Ragay section in 1938. In 1942, the Japanese government took control of the operations of the Manila Railroad Company and the 200 class was included in the Japanese operations of the MRR.

Four units managed to survive after World War II, Nos. 205, 206, 208 and 209, all of which were still in active service by 1952. In comparison, the 170 class survived with three units after the war. Even after the dieselization efforts of the Manila Railroad was initiated in 1956, the locomotives continued its duties well into the 1960s. No. 206 was stored in San Fernando railyard by c. 1965 and was eventually scrapped there in the decades after. The class is now considered extinct.

=== Accidents ===
A rare photograph emerged in 2017 showing two 200 class locomotives colliding during the height of World War II. The two engines appeared to have been abandoned by 1946 and would be scrapped later on.
