= Manila Railroad Company =

Historical rail transport operator

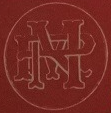
- Manila Railroad's second and final monogram.

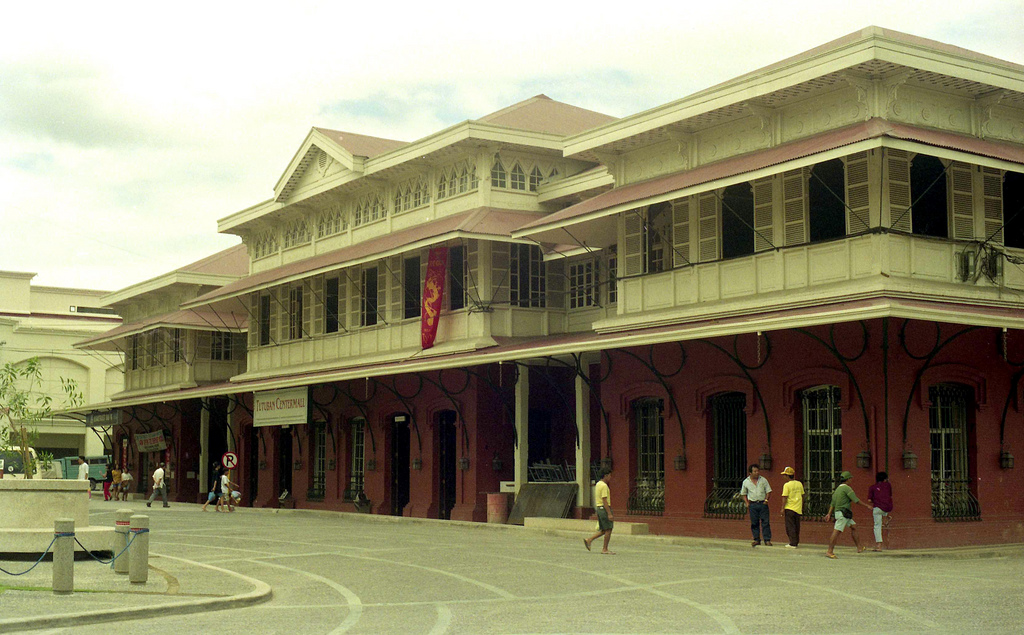
- Old Tutuban station in 2008 after its conversion to a shopping mall.
- Type: Private limited company (1887–1916); State-owned enterprise (1916–64)
- Traded as: Ferrocarril de Manila a Dagupan
- Industry: Rail transport Hospitality industry
- Founded: June 1, 1887; November 24, 1892 (incorporation)
- Defunct: June 20, 1964; 62 years ago
- Successor: Philippine National Railways
- Headquarters: Calle Azcarraga (Now Recto Avenue); Manila, Philippines (Note: Board of directors were also located in London, United Kingdom (1887–1916) and in 45 Nassau Street, New York City, USA (1906–16))
- Area served: Luzon
- Key people: Edmund Hett Sykes; Horace L. Higgins (Note: Appointed general manager from 1887 to 1916.); José B. Paez (Note: The first Filipino general manager, 1923–41.)
- Services: Passenger rail Freight rail Buses; Train ferry Hotel management
- Owner: Government of the Philippines
- Divisions: Manila and Dagupan Railroad; Tarlac Railway; Legazpi Division; Manila Hotel; MRR Auto Lines (Note: Comprising Luzon and Benguet Auto Lines); Manila Port Service (Note: Until the 1950s known as the MRR Maritime Fleet)

The Manila Railroad Company (MRR) was a Filipino state-owned enterprise responsible for the management and operation of rail transport in the island of Luzon. It was originally established by an Englishman named Edmund Sykes (Note: Also known by his Hispanicized name Don Edmundo Sykes.) as the private Manila Railway Co., Ltd. on June 1, 1887. British engineer Horace L. Higgins was then assigned as its first general manager in Manila. On July 7, 1906, a separate private entity named the Manila Railroad Company of New Jersey was established. The two companies continued to own the Luzon railroad network until February 4, 1916 when the Insular Government acquired both companies and absorbed them into the new Manila Railroad.

The MRR was the largest single railroad operator in the Philippines of its time. It owned 1,140 kilometers (710 mi) of track at its peak in the late 1930s, approximately one-fifth of all the rail network in the country by 1939. It also had various types of rolling stock from the early tank locomotives and boxcars of the 1890s to the diesel-electric GE Universal Series and Japanese-built steel-bodied railcars of the 1950s. Aside from rail transport, the railroad also invested in buses, the water transportation industry and the hospitality industry.

The Manila Railroad was then reorganized into the Philippine National Railways on June 20, 1964.

== History ==
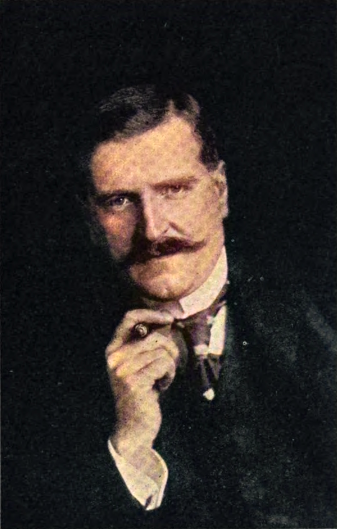
Horace L. Higgins (fl. 1887–1916) was the founding general manager of the Manila Railway. He became president in the 1900s.

The first proposals for a railroad system in the Philippines was enacted by King Alfonso XII of Spain on June 20, 1875. It directed the Office of the Inspector of Public Works of the Philippines to submit a layout for future railroads in Luzon, the largest island in the Spanish East Indies. Public works chief Eduardo Lopez Navarro then submitted the General Plan for Railroads in the Island of Luzon on August 6 which was approved by the King Alfonso later that month. In 1882, a detailed design was made for the Ferrocarril de Manila a Dagupan leading to Pangasinan. Bids were laid out on January 26, 1885. The sole bidder was led by Englishman Edmund Hett Sykes' Manila Railway Company, Limited, known to the Spanish as Don Edmundo. His bid was awarded on June 1, 1887 but Sykes transferred the ownership of the consortium to Carlos Bertadano on July 8.

English engineer Horace L. Higgins was assigned as the overall general manager in the Philippines. Spanish officer José Gago y Palomo was also invited to oversee the overall security operations during the construction of the line. However, Palomo refused and instead joined the expeditionary forces of Governors-General Valeriano Weyler and Ramon Blanco against the Moro people, where he served as an engineer in what is now Tukuran, Zamboanga del Sur. Construction began on July 31, 1887.

Rolling stock acquisition began almost immediately with the five Manila class light-duty tank locomotives built in 1885 and 1886, though its operations were initially handed over to the Manila Tranvías. Soon after, the first mainline locomotives were ordered in the form of 30 Dagupan class locomotives from Scotland. Passenger cars were also ordered from the Metropolitan Carriage Company, later Metro-Cammell of Britain. These initial sets were quite short compared to those used in Europe and only accommodated first- and second-class passengers with 24 seats each, the third-class passengers were put into modified boxcars.

=== Philippine–American War ===
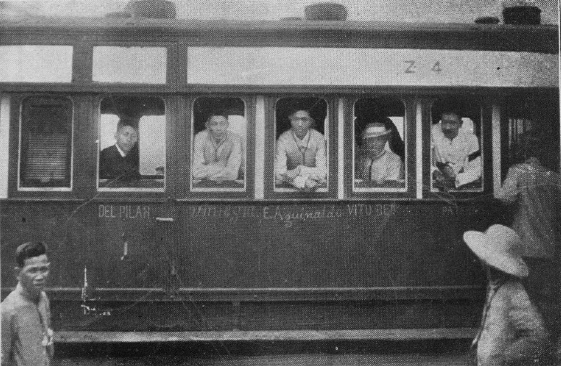
President Emilio Aguinaldo used the railroad during his presidency and his escape.

During the Philippine–American War, the railroads were rather neutral having supported both Filipino and American forces. Most notably, the Manila Railway was the primary route of escape for then-president Emilio Aguinaldo and his cabinet from the advancing American forces towards Central Luzon. Higgins himself was also involved in the sabotage of a bridge during the Battle of Calumpit. Not long after, the American forces also took control of the company after Aguinaldo completed his escape.

Despite being initially in Filipino hands, the American occupation of the Manila Railway and the Tranvía became instrumental in accelerating the decline of the First Philippine Republic and eventual capture of Aguinaldo in Isabela. Insurgencies came afterwards for the remaining Filipino forces during the war. American forces marked the rolling stock with various military company insignia until the insurgencies in Luzon ended in the mid-1900s.

=== American period ===
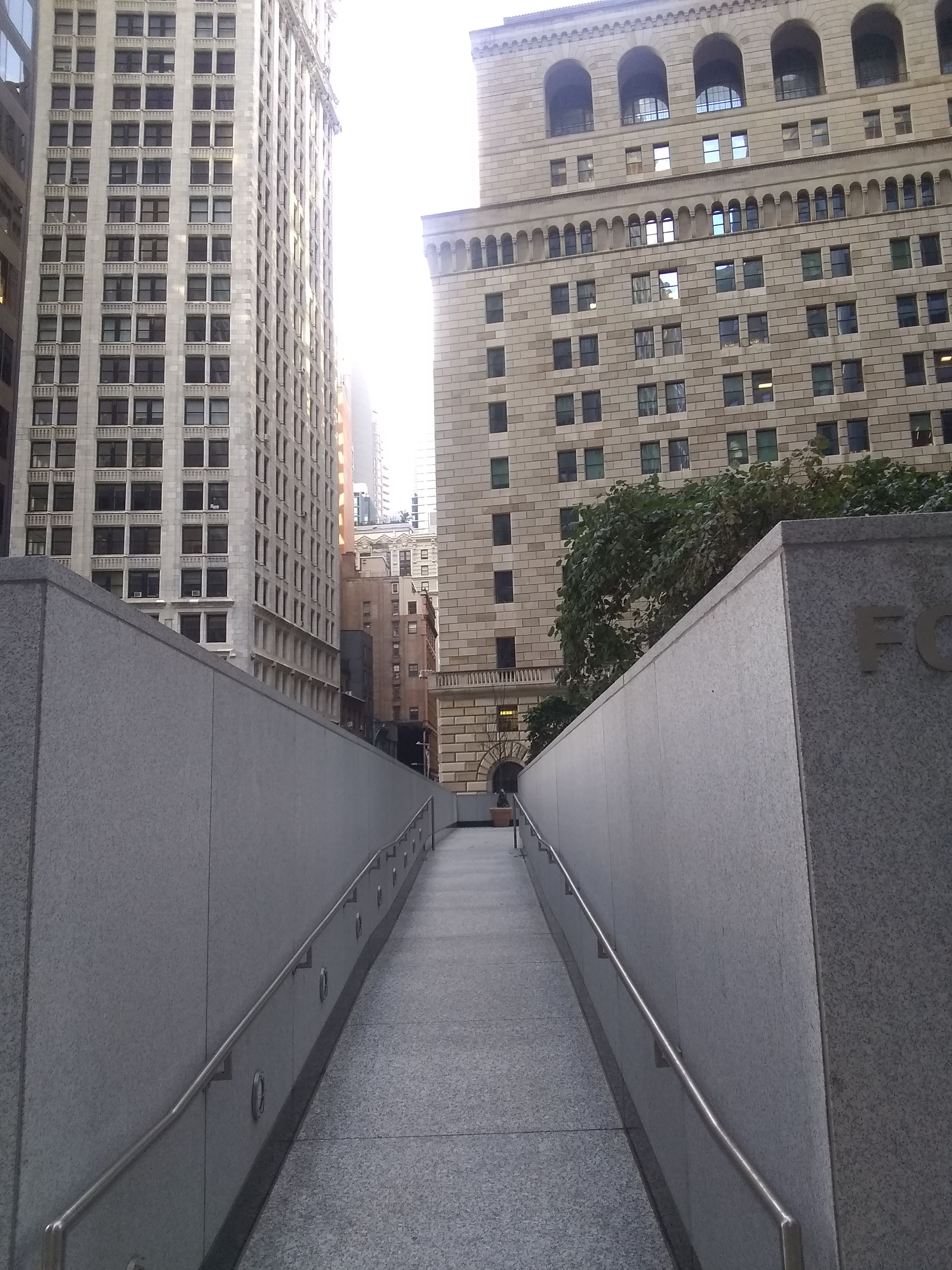
45 Nassau Street (left) hosted the headquarters of the Manila Railroad Company of New Jersey.

The negative sentiment of foreign journalists regarding the rolling stock urged the Manila Railway to order more proper railcars. In 1900, Delaware-based Harlan and Hollingsworth and Jackson and Sharp Company provided the first long coaches in the country. Metropolitan also provided their own stock soon after. By 1904, there were 120 passenger cars and 556 freight cars.

Two new entities were then formed in 1906, the London-based Manila Railway Company (1906), Limited and the Manila Railroad Company of New Jersey. That same year, the company managed to acquire its first tender locomotives in the form of the Manila Railway 100 class. The Philippine entity has been renamed into the Manila Railroad Company soon after. Before 1913, the MRR's American board of directors transferred from New Jersey to 45 Nassau Street, a skyscraper in New York City.

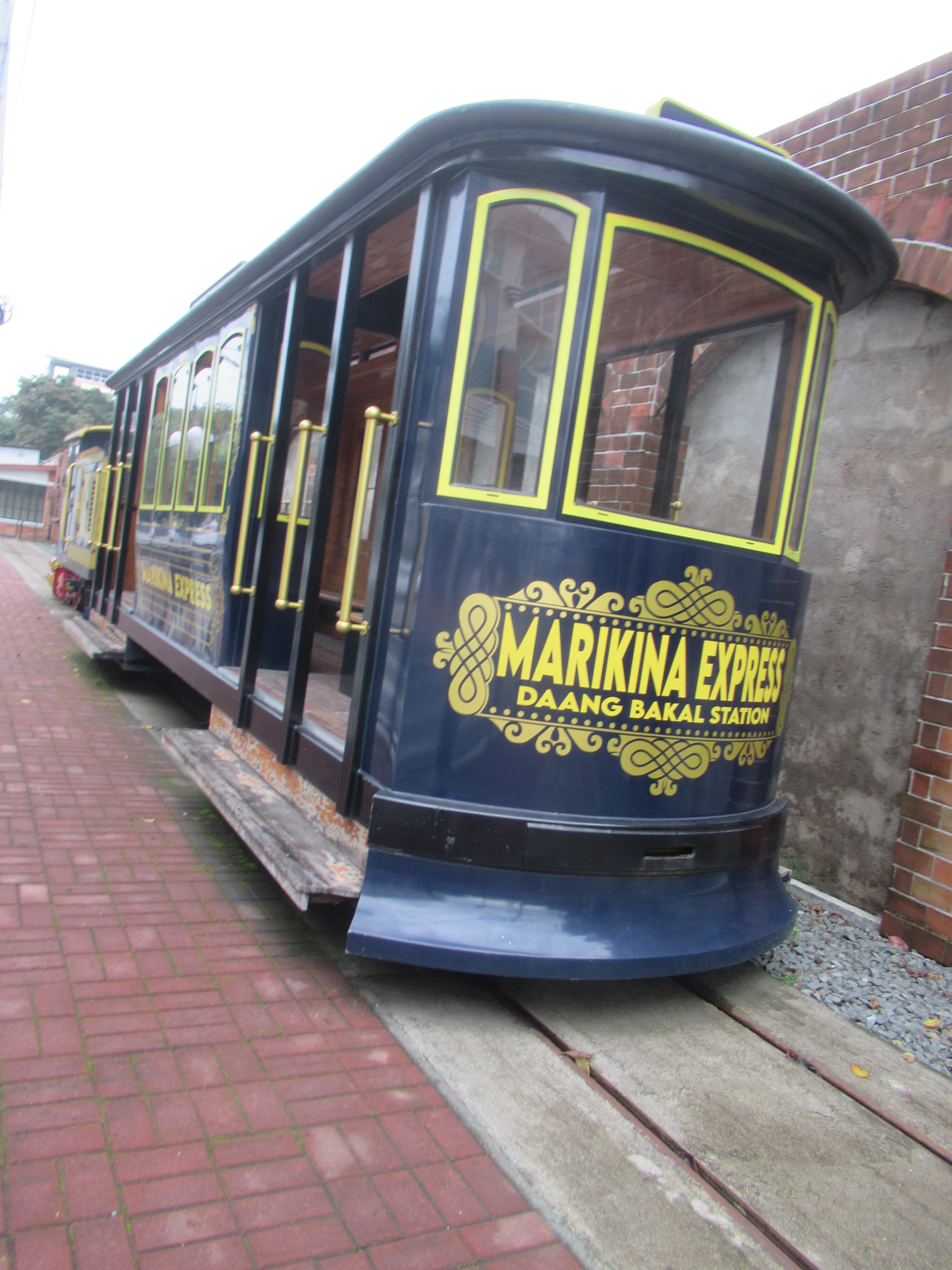
Marikina Express Daang Bakal Station

==== State ownership ====
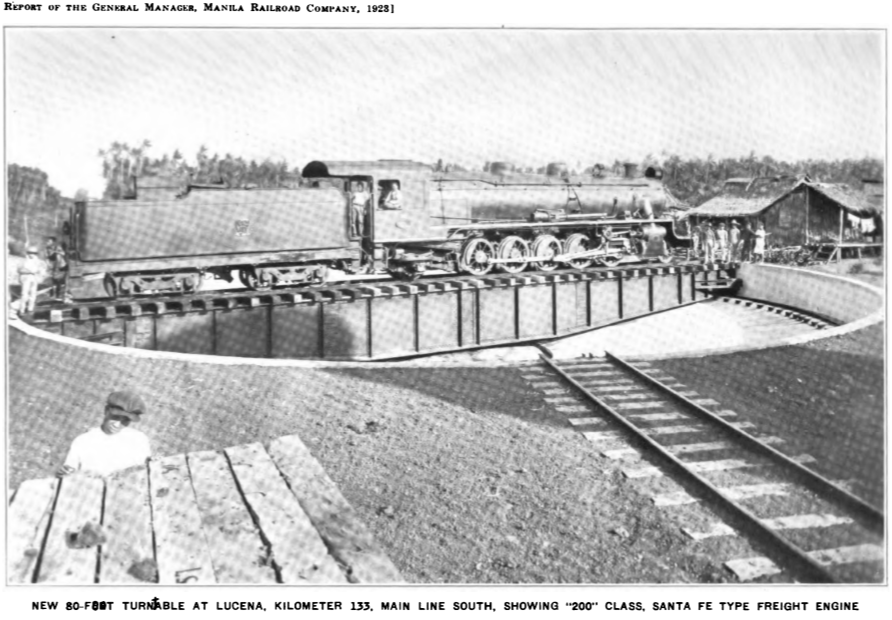
A 200 class Santa Fe in Lucena.

The Insular Government of the Philippine Islands has proposed to acquire the Manila Railroad system in the midst of World War I. On February 2, 1916, the London-based Manila Railway Company (1906) Limited and the Manila Railroad Company of New Jersey were both acquired by the government and were incorporated into the new state-owned Manila Railroad Company. Higgins stepped down as president and a number of Americans handled the post of president and general manager, most notably United States Army colonel and Republican National Committee member for the Philippines Henry Bayard McCoy (1866–1923).

This brief period between 1916 and 1923 introduced the Americanization of the MRR. American-built tender locomotives replaced the aging Scottish-built tank locomotives and lighter-built tender locomotives. Annual reports have also adopted American English conventions as a result. Metropolitan, having been a long-time supplier of coaches under Higgins, stopped manufacturing for the country in 1923. American Car and Foundry Company stepped in as their replacement afterwards.

==== Filipino leadership ====
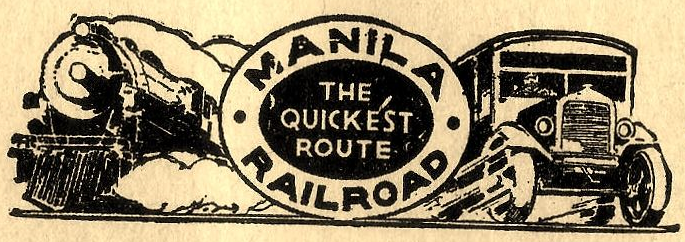
The MRR logo in the 1930s.

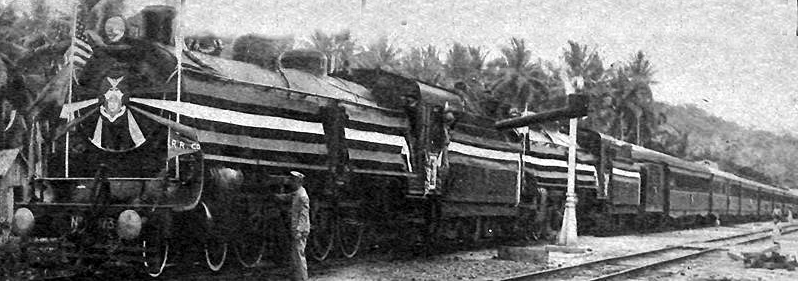
The MRR managed to connect most of Luzon by rail in 1938.

McCoy was then succeeded by the agency's first Filipino general manager, Jose B. Paez. The MRR during his term established its own rolling stock manufacturing facility in its Caloocan workshop. Initially tasked with the assembly of railcars or coaches, the MRR soon started manufacturing its own stock. In 1929, the MRR started manufacturing the country's first multiple unit train, the RMC series, in cooperation with Ramcar, which became the first ever diesel multiple units of Southeast Asia beginning 1940, when the then gasoline powered MUs switched to diesel fuel. No. 65, the twenty-first 45 class locomotive, was assembled in 1932. Not long after in 1936, then-Philippine president Manuel L. Quezon initiated plans for what would become the Mindanao Railway, an electrified standard-gauge railway compared to the steam-powered 3 ft 6 in gauge railways of the Manila Railroad during that time. Construction began immediately, but the project never went past track bed construction when it was abandoned in 1940. Aside from rolling stock, National Artist of the Philippines for Architecture Pablo S. Antonio designed several of the stations.

Paez's term with the Manila Railroad then ended on December 31, 1941, when the Imperial Japanese Army took control of the Philippines in the midst of World War II.

=== Japanese period ===
After Paez stepped down from his post as general manager, the Japanese Railway Corps took control of the Manila Railroad on January 1, 1942. The company was then placed under the administration of the Riku′un Kanrikyoku or the Land Transportation Management Bureau. The first train from Manila to San Fernando, Pampanga was inaugurated on February 15. The most notable event during its brief takeover was its involvement during the Bataan Death March to transfer prisoners of war from San Fernando, Pampanga to Capas, Tarlac in April of that year. Aside from deaths from starvation on the way to San Fernando, there were also accounts of prisoners of war dying on the train cars.

Services were returned on the Cabanatuan branch on May 14. The entirety of the North Main Line to La Union was reopened on July 21, 1942. The South Main Line was the last to reopen, having been reopened in March 1943. The Japanese then extended Main Line North from San Fernando, La Union to Sudipen near the border with Ilocos Sur. The extension held its groundbreaking ceremony on April 6, 1943 and the line was opened by the Riku′un Kanrikyoku in January 1944. The extension from Bacnotan to Sudipen was then dismantled in 1945 to reconstruct the lines destroyed during the war. Even then, passenger trains terminated at San Fernando with only freight trains continuing north to Bacnotan.

In 1945, amidst the Second Philippines Campaign, the Manila Railroad became the Luzon Military Railway under the United States Army. Around that same year, the Manila Railroad 300 class rack locomotives used on the Aringay line were scrapped during the Americans' northward advance. The nameplate belonging to No. 306 Mirador was rescued from the rubble and was restored much later in the California State Railroad Museum.

=== Third Republic ===
The Luzon Military Railway, the temporary name of the Manila Railroad during the Philippines Campaign, was renamed back to the Manila Railroad in 1946. At the same time, Sergio Bayan filled the previously vacant spot of general manager and finished Paez's 1941 report. According to a 1952 report, 75 percent of all MRR rolling stock were destroyed during the war. The agency adopted so-called zombie cars as a result to augment passenger coaches destroyed by the war. These were gondola cars and flatcars with trapal tents placed on top to provide cover akin to reused boxcars during the early days of the Manila Railway. Additionally, the remaining serviceable stock were rebuilt from 1946 and became the 4, 5, and 6 series coaches.

A number of ex-US Army locomotives were also acquired such as the 800 class USA and the 8500 class diesel switchers. The first steel-bodied cars, marked 7C, were acquired from the Pullman Car Company in 1948. A purchase of seven 4-8-2 locomotives followed in 1949 to replace Manila Railroad 170 class units destroyed by the war, numbered the 100 class. Japanese company Nippon Sharyo also provided the JNR Class D51 locomotives in 1951 as part of war reparations, numbered the 300 class. This would be the last steam locomotive order of the MRR.

==== Cagayan Valley and Mindanao extensions ====
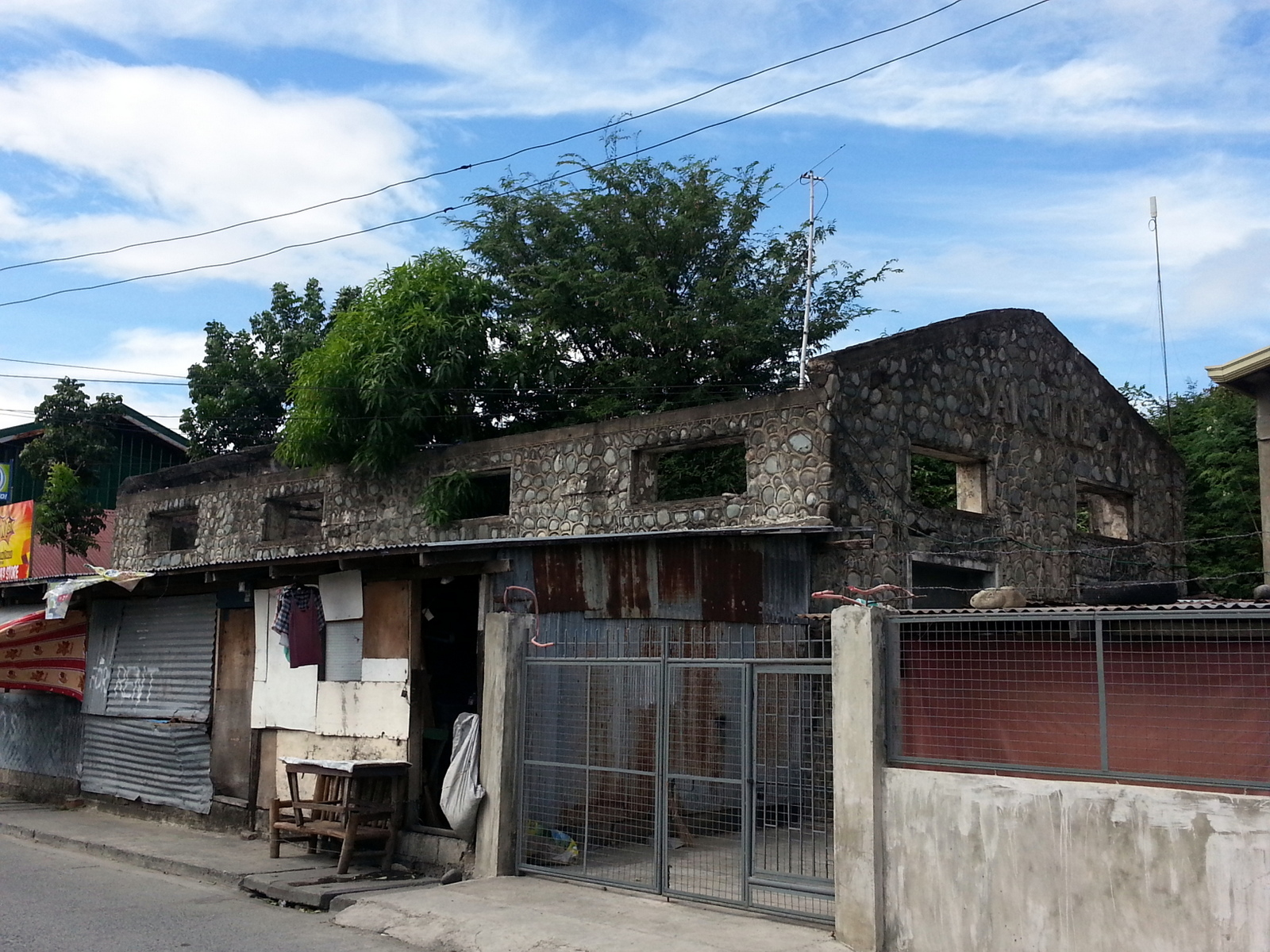
The former MRR station in San Jose, Nueva Ecija was part of the unfinished Cagayan Valley line.

That same year, then-Defense Secretary Ramon Magsaysay was briefly appointed by Elpidio Quirino to the position of general manager. His 2 month short term as general manager realized the long-overdue extension of railroad services to the Cagayan Valley, dubbed the Cagayan Valley Railway Extension Project. In 1952, American consultancy firm De Leuw, Cather and Company also made a feasibility study for the construction of a railroad in the island of Mindanao, succeeding Quezon's proposal of 1936 and predating the Mindanao Railway of the present day. While it failed to construct the Mindanao railroad system, it succeeded in modernizing the Manila Railroad's rolling stock, acquiring more steel passenger cars and the dieselization of its fleet.

In 1953, Magsaysay was elected as President of the Philippines and continued the construction of the Cagayan Valley line during his term. The following year, general manager Salvador Villa started the MRR dieselization program as previously proposed by De Leuw. He ordered 40 locomotives from GE Transportation which in turn made the MRR one of the first customers of the new GE Universal Series diesel locomotives. In August 1956, the remaining steam locomotives were retired from all its flagship services regardless of their age. Asides from GE, the agency also ordered several passenger cars from Japanese manufacturers. Carlos P. Garcia succeeded Magsaysay as the president in March 1957 after the latter died in a plane crash and continued the Cagayan Valley line.

Prior to 1961, the extent of the line that was already completed became the San Jose branch of the North Main Line. On July 15, the MRR started work on the Cagayan line. A book was published which also contains the intentions to expand the existing MRR network to Mindanao and Eastern Visayas with ferries connecting all of them.

==== Final years ====
Macapagal defeated Garcia for the presidential bid in 1961. His administration hosted visits of two Asian monarchs in 1962 and 1963. MRR readily involved in transporting these heads of state and their spouses outside of Manila. Crown Prince Akihito of Japan and Princess Michiko also visited the country between November 5 and 10, 1962. While their visit continued, the proposed Imperial Train to carry the couple to Baguio was cancelled. A year later on July 9 to 14, King Bhumibol Adulyadej and Queen Sirikit of Thailand visited the Philippines and traveled to Bauang, La Union on a 2000 class-hauled royal train operated by the MRR.

Not long after the two monarchs' visits to the country and amidst a looming financial crisis caused by Garcia's tight currency controls and the Filipino First policy, the Manila Railroad became the present-day Philippine National Railways by the virtue of Republic Act 4156 on June 20, 1964. This name change was patterned after its Japanese counterpart, who also provided railcars for the MRR.

==== Legacy ====
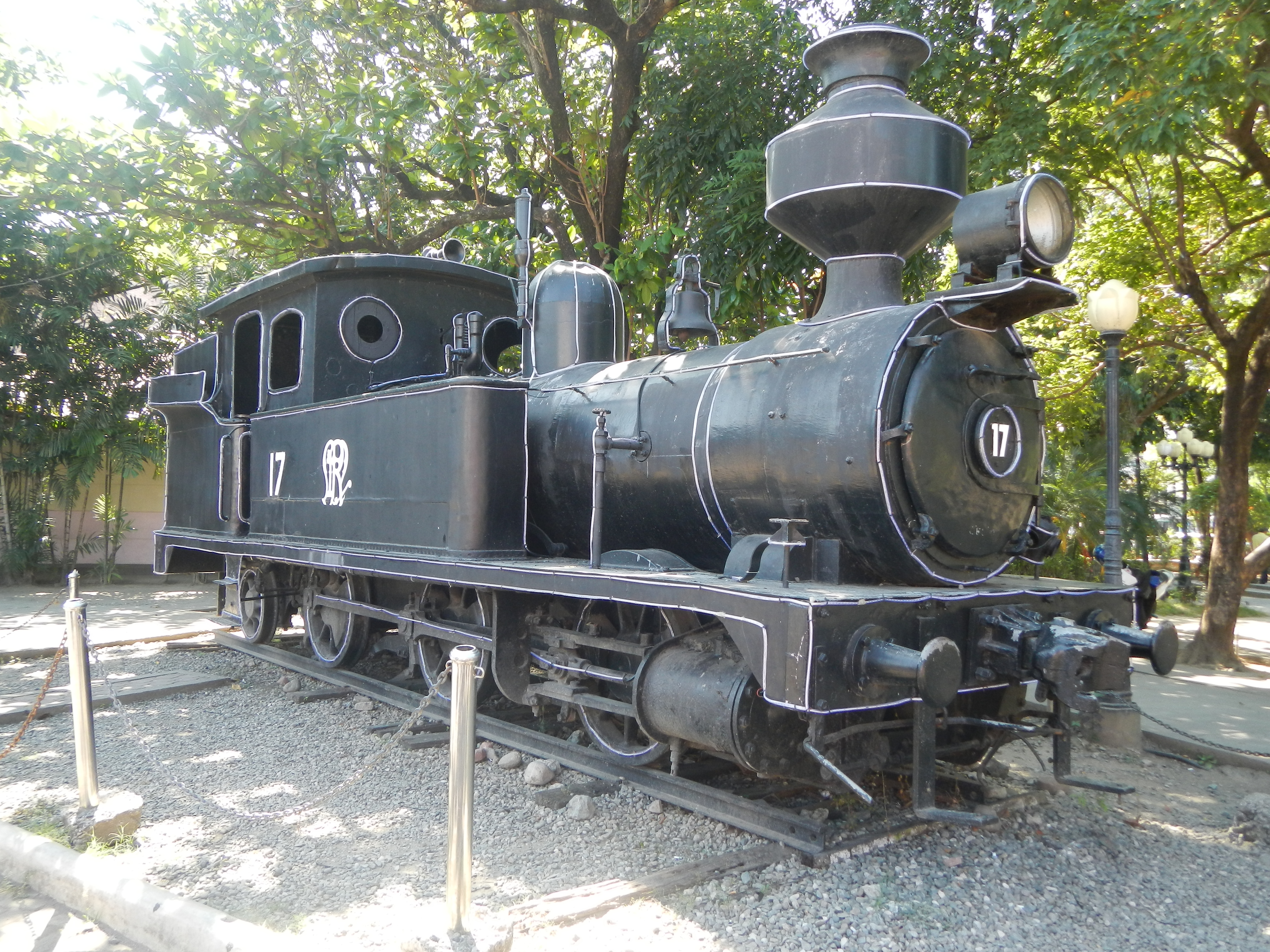
No. 17 Urdaneta was one of the four remaining locomotives from the Manila Railroad.

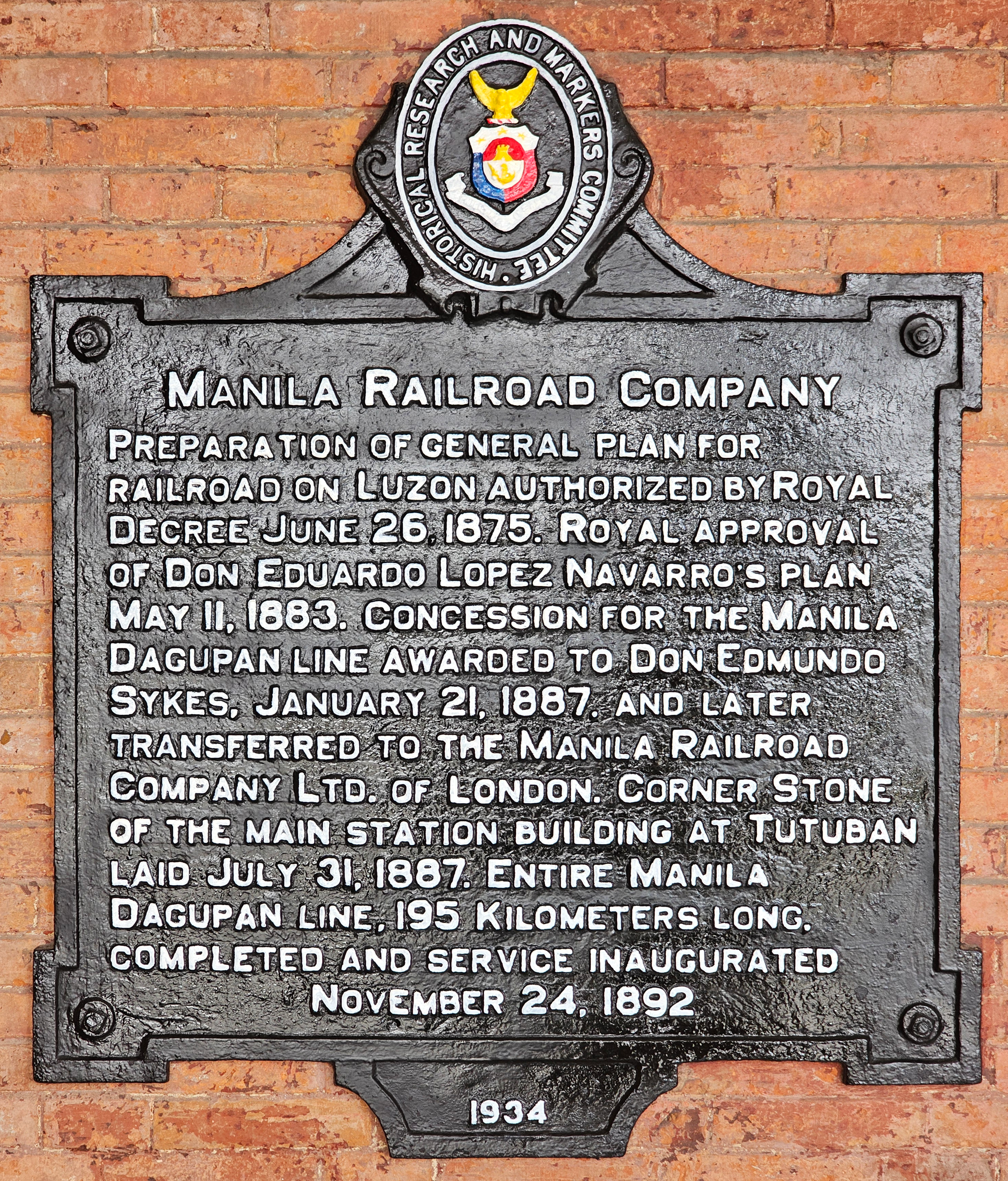
HRMC historical marker

In Thailand, the King's visit influenced the State Railway of Thailand to purchase their own version of the 2000 class during the mid-1960s during the transition period from MRR to PNR. While both versions featured a shovelnose design due to the shape of the cowcatcher, the Thai UM12Cs instead had a dual-cab layout with a cab-over design similar to other railroads in mainland Asia compared to the more Americanized cab used by the MRR. These UM12Cs remain in service into the 2020s unlike the 2000 class which were scrapped altogether in the 1990s until 2000.

Despite after almost 150 years since the first plans were submitted, the original proposed network for the Manila Railroad in Luzon never managed to reach its full extent and was never expanded from there. Several of the initial lines remained in proposal stage to this day such as the Cagayan Valley extension becoming the North Long Haul East while the line to San Fernando and the proposed extension to Laoag becoming the North Long Haul West, the original 1936 plans for the expansion to Mindanao becoming the Mindanao Railway, and the reconstruction of the old southern line became the PNR South Long Haul project.

Lastly, most of the traces of the Manila Railroad were lost to history. Out of the hundreds of locomotives and railcars that entered the MRR, only three were saved while only one pre-war railcar and a few post-war steel coaches remain. All tender were scrapped in the remaining years of the 20th century. The last remaining diesel locomotive from this era, Manila Railroad No. 4010 was transferred to the Victorias Milling Company as No. 41, although this locomotive has already been shelved as of 2022.

== Other operations ==
The Manila Railroad also expanded its business beyond rail transport.

=== Buses ===
The MRR also had the Auto Lines division, which had the Benguet Auto Line, Luzon Bus Lines, and for a short period, the Mindanao Motor Line. The Manila Railroad's Auto Lines subsidiary became the PNR Motor Services in 1964. It was later merged into the Metro Manila Transit Corporation (MMTC) sometime between 1984 and 1988. The PNR Motor Services in Metro Manila became the Metrobus in 1990 as the bus equivalent of the Metrotren. However, this service was short-lived as the MMTC became bankrupt in 1995, splitting into four companies. One of the four companies that emerged from the split, DCOMMP Transport, was acquired by HM Transport in 2017.

=== Hospital service ===
The MRR hosted hospital trains in the 1930s which used older rolling stock including a 70 class locomotive No. 79 and an express coach.

=== Hotel business ===
The MRR initially had a minority stake at the Manila Hotel and its revenues were stated in its annual reports. In 1919, the hotel became a subsidiary of the MRR after nationalization. The ownership of the hotel was eventually transferred to the Government Services Insurance System (GSIS) on January 28, 1975 by virtue of Presidential Decree No. 645. The hotel was then reprivatized in 1995.

=== Maritime division ===
The Manila Railroad's maritime branch was the MRR Maritime Fleet. This division owned steamship ferries to places around the country that were not connected to the MRR network. Additionally, it also handled train ferries to the Legazpi Division on what is now the PNR South Main Line until it was connected to the rest of the Main Line South on May 8, 1938. In the late 1950s, the Maritime Fleet became the Manila Port Service. The Manila Port Service continued its operations until it was eventually merged into the Philippine Ports Authority sometime after its last known lawsuit on July 9, 1976.

== Rolling stock ==
The Manila Railroad operated steam and diesel locomotives until the 1960s. The last Manila Railroad locomotive to be retired was the 2000 class, which were retired in 1999 and the last unit was scrapped in 2000. Some of the Manila Railroad coaches are still stored in various locations in the present-day PNR network.

== Technological innovation ==
The Manila Railroad is one of the oldest continuous rail operators in Asia through its successor, the Philippine National Railways. In Southeast Asia, the MRR was only second to Indonesia's Nederlandsch-Indische Spoorweg Maatschappij which opened in 1873. However, the early days of the Manila Railway era lagged considerably in terms of rail technology compared to countries like Japan, India or the West. The company was criticized for having light-duty locomotives and a cramped first-class railcars and boxcars that were unfit for long-distance travel. The trains also ran slowly at a top speed of 32 km/h (20 mph). It was not until the mid-1900s when the Manila Railway started acquiring tender locomotives and longer railcars. The introduction of American technology to the Philippines boosted the competitiveness of the new Manila Railroad.

=== Meyer locomotives ===
The MRR acquired Meyer locomotives from Kitson and Company in 1914. These 2-6-0+0-6-2 locomotives are the first of its kind in Asia and the only operators of the type in the Far East region. In comparison, other railroads operated other forms of articulated locomotives such as Mallets and Garratts for steep inclines.

=== Domestic production ===
By the 1920s, the Manila Railroad became involved in the construction and assembly of their own rolling stock with designs from Metropolitan, American Car and Foundry, among others. The MRR's Caloocan Workshops built the Rail Motor Car (RMC) class starting in 1929 to replace the remaining tank locomotives on local services. After an accident in 1940, these were rebuilt with diesel engines - making history as the first ever diesel multiple units, not only in the country, but also in Southeast Asia, and became instrumental for the dieselization of the MRR later on. The company then assembled its twenty-first 45 class locomotive in 1932. No. 65 was made from parts belonging to the other 20 units. In 1949, parts of 2-8-2 Mikado-type locomotives were acquired from the War Assets Administration and became the two 630 class units, the only locomotives assembled by the Caloocan Workshops.

=== Dieselization ===
Dieselization of the MRR began with the conversion of the RMC class in 1940, just before World War II. After a 1952 recommendation, the Manila Railroad began by ordering sixty diesel-electric locomotives from General Electric, including GE Universal Series locomotives, and steel cars from Japanese suppliers. Diesel multiple units from Daiichi Bussan Kaisha also started replacing the RMC class from 1955.

By the mid and late 1950s, steam locomotives were being phased out in favor of diesel. Starting on August 12, 1956, the MRR was one of the first to retire its steam locomotives from flagship passenger operations. The last regular run of steam locomotives happened in 1963 while the last special operation happened during the filming of the war film Harimao in 1989.

=== Electrification plans ===
Electrification and standard-gauge specifications were proposed for the first Mindanao Railway in the late 1930s. Satre (1999) also stated that the Cagayan Valley line tunnels had allowances for electrification in its design due to pollution concerns within the tunnels. However, these never materialized for the rest of the Manila Railroad's days, instead opting for conversion to diesel power. The Philippine National Railways eventually realized this goal in the 2020s, instead focusing in modern-day Mega Manila by rebuilding its existing network as part of the North–South Commuter Railway project.

=== Car carriers ===
During the early 20th century, passenger trains had flatcars which carried carriages and early cars as some sort of a proto-autorack.
