= Manila Railroad 170 class =

Philippine steam locomotive class from 1922

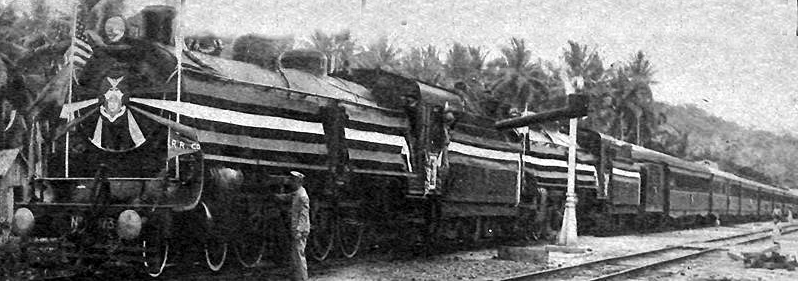
- Two MRR 170 class locomotives; Nos. 173 and 177 double-heading the inauguration of the second Bicol Express to Legazpi on May 8, 1938.
Type and origin
- Power type: Steam
- Builder: American Locomotive Company (Brooks Plant)
- Serial number: 62729–38
- Build date: 1921-22
- Total produced: 10
Specifications
- Configuration
  - Whyte: 4-8-2
  - UIC: 2'D1' h3P
- Gauge: 3 ft 6 in (1,067 mm)
- Driver dia.: 60 in (1,500 mm)
- Wheelbase
  - Engine: 34.58 ft (10.54 m)
  - Drivers: 15.75 ft (4.80 m)
- Length: 80 ft (24 m)
- Adhesive weight: 119,000 lb (54 t; 54,000 kg)
- Loco weight: 183,000 lb (83 t; 83,000 kg)
- Tender weight: 155,000 lb (70 t; 70,000 kg)
- Total weight: 338,000 lb (153 t; 153,000 kg)
- Tender type: Four-axle tender
- Fuel type: Coal, oil
- Fuel capacity: 6,000 US gal (23,000 L) oil or 6 t (13,000 lb) coal
- Water cap.: 5,000 US gal (19,000 L)
- Firebox
  - Type
  - Grate area: 32 sq ft (3.0 m^{2})
- Boiler pressure: 180 psi (1,200 kPa)
- Heating surface
  - Firebox: 176 sq ft (16.4 m^{2})
  - Tubes: 416 sq ft (38.6 m^{2})
  - Flues: 498 sq ft (46.3 m^{2})
  - Tubes and flues: 914 sq ft (84.9 m^{2})
  - Total surface
- Superheater
  - Heating area: 493 sq ft (45.8 m^{2})
- Cylinders: 3
- Cylinder size: 20 in (510 mm) diameter x 28 in (710 mm) stroke
- Valve gear: Walschaerts
- Valve type: Piston valves
- Couplers: Buffers and chain coupler
Performance figures
- Maximum speed: 40 mph (64 km/h) (service); 80 mph (130 km/h) (design)
- Power output: 1,944 hp (1,450 kW)
- Tractive effort: 42,840 lbf (190.6 kN)
- Factor of adh.: 2.78
Career
- Operators: Manila Railroad Company
- Number in class: 10
- Numbers: 171-180
- Locale: South Main Line, Luzon
- Delivered: 1921-22
- First run: 1922
- Withdrawn: August 15, 1956
- Preserved: 0
- Scrapped: 1945, 1968
- Disposition: Last unit scrapped in 1968

The Manila Railroad 170 class were ten 4-8-2 Mountain steam locomotives operated by the Manila Railroad Company (MRR), predecessor of the Philippine National Railways. They were built alongside the 2-10-2 Santa Fe-type Manila Railroad 200 class by the American Locomotive Company at its Brooks facility between 1921 and 1922. During its service at the MRR, it carried passenger trains on the South Main Line between Manila and the Bicol Region.

A handful of locomotives survived World War II unlike its sister the Manila Railroad 200 class and continued to serve until August 1956, when diesel locomotives started to replace them. These locomotives were ultimately scrapped without a single unit preserved like all of the Manila Railroad's tender locomotives.

== Background ==
The London-based Manila Railway Company was purchased by the Insular Government of the Philippine Islands in 1916 during the height of World War I in Europe. It was renamed into the Manila Railroad Company with Col. Henry B. McCoy replacing Horace L. Higgins as the general manager.

Although then-Manila Railway already had some locomotives built by the American Locomotive Company such as the 2-8-0-type 130 class, its steam locomotives (especially all of its tank locomotives) continued to be built by British manufacturers. Under the new Manila Railroad administration however, its policy changed to purchasing only tender locomotives from American manufacturers. The move aimed to replace the aging British locomotives built in the 1890s and the 1900s from mainline service.

The numbering of the 170 class follows suit of the Manila Railroad 160 class built in 1914. Despite being the newest of the British-built rolling stock, the 160 class earned a negative reception during its operations on the Antipolo line and the South Main Line. Therefore, the 160 class was included among those to be replaced by American locomotives.

Following the success of the 45 class, the Manila Railroad ordered 20 heavy-duty locomotives from the American Locomotive Company in 1921. Ten of these would become the Manila Railroad 170 class 4-8-2 for passenger service while another ten would become the Manila Railroad 200 class 2-10-2 for freight.

== Design ==
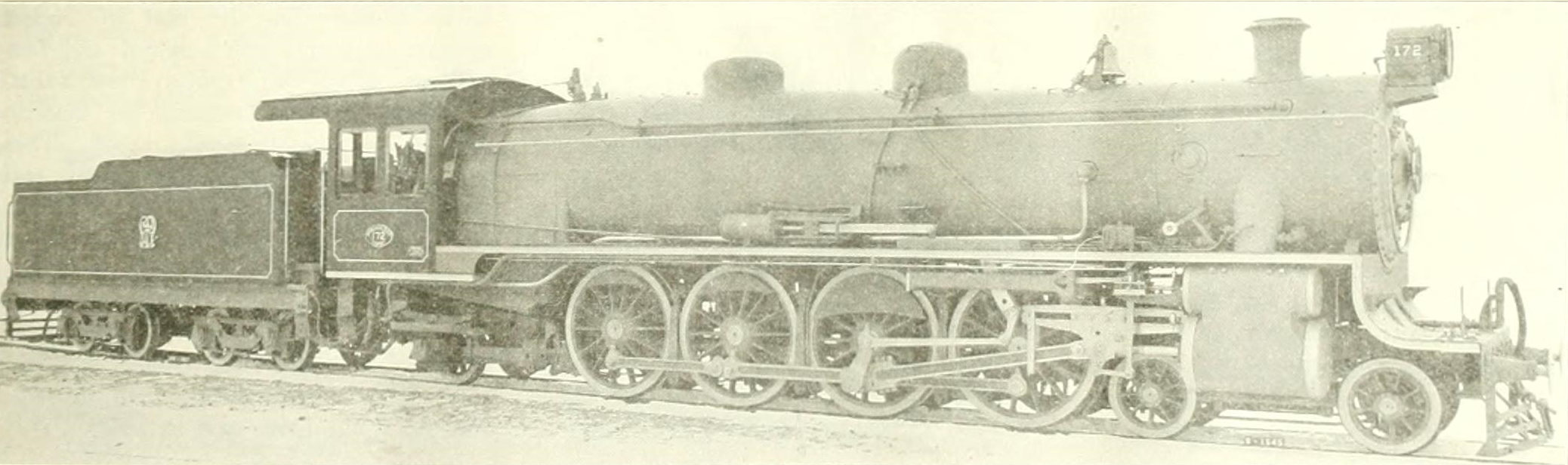
MRR No. 172 as it appeared in the Railway and Locomotive Engineering magazine in 1922.

Both the 170 and 200 classes were built with the same specifications in mind. Their only differences are those related to the wheel arrangement such as weight distribution and driver diameter. The 170 class was also lighter by 5,000 pounds (2,300 kilograms) than the 200 class.

According to Snowden Bell's 1922 article, the 170 class locomotives were built with interchangeable parts with the 200 class. This is to reduce the number of extra parts due to the distance between the Philippines and the United States, the latter being where the spare parts were manufactured. Both locomotives may also be powered with coal or oil, making them have the option as an oil-burning locomotive. However, the parts required for the modifications of the forward axle of the 2-10-2 arrangement were not interchangeable.

Due to its similarities with the 200 class, the 170 class also had the largest cylinders of any non-articulated narrow-gauge locomotive during its time. It was not until the South African Henschel Giants of 1927 used cylinders that are wider by 0.5 in (13 mm) in diameter. However it had a comparatively small boiler and grate area. The locomotives also had the latest American three-cylinder technology, which was also brought to other countries in Asia later in the 1920s such as the JNR Class C52. Its four-axle tender is a heavier version of the one used by the 45 class and resembles the ones used by heavy-duty locomotives in the US.

Llanso (2007) estimated that the power output of the locomotives was at 1,944 horsepower (1,450 kilowatts). It would be rated between the contemporary PNR 900 class at the lower-end and the INKA CC300 at the higher-end.

== Service ==
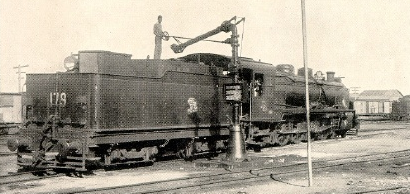
Manila Railroad 179, the latest of the class, refueling its oil tender in 1930.

The 170 class entered service in 1922. Being the passenger version of the 200 classes, it mostly operated on the South Main Line as there were not much evidence of their usage on the network's northern counterpart. On May 8, 1938, two 170-class locomotives hauled nine coaches the first Bicol Express in its new terminus in Legazpi, Albay. For the remaining years of the interwar period, it hauled southern Luzon's limited express trains and was complemented by the MC class self-propelled railcars for short-range regional rail services.

By the outbreak of World War II, the Manila Railroad was placed under Japanese control and its rolling stock was used by its military.

=== Post-war service ===
The Manila Railroad suffered heavily after World War II, and it was also evident with its steam locomotive fleet. Only three out of ten 170 class locomotives managed to survive the war. The 200 class locomotives were also scrapped altogether after being deemed beyond repair. The Manila Railroad then received ten 4-8-2 locomotives from the United States, alongside several 2-8-2 Mikados as part of war reparations. Numbered after Manila Railway 100 class of 1906, the first tender locomotives in Philippine service, the Manila Railroad 100 class complemented the 170 class on passenger services throughout Luzon.

=== Retirement ===
By 1956, all steam locomotives were retired from mainline service as diesel locomotives built by GE and the JMC-class diesel multiple units built by Japan replaced them. In 1968, No. 176 was stored awaiting to be scrapped in Tutuban alongside Manila Railroad 800 class USA No. 869. These were eventually scrapped without a single unit preserved like all of Manila Railroad's tender locomotives.
