= Class 70 =

Class 70 or 70 class may refer to:

== Australia ==
- New South Wales 70 class locomotive, diesel-hydraulic locomotives

== Germany ==
- DRG Class 70, a class of German passenger locomotive with a 2-4-0T wheel arrangement operated by the Deutsche Reichsbahn and comprising the:
- DRG Class 70.0: Bavarian Pt 2/3
- DRG Class 70.1: Baden I g
- DRG Class 70.2: ELE T 4
- DR Class 70.61, DR Class 70.63 and DR Class 70.64 : locomotives taken over by the Deutsche Reichsbahn (GDR) in East Germany in 1949
- DRG Class 70.71: Bavarian D IX

== Philippines ==
- Manila Railway 70 class, 0-6-2 steam locomotives

== United Kingdom ==
- British Rail Class 70 (electric), electric locomotives built by the Southern Railway in the 1940s
- British Rail Class 70, diesel locomotives built by GE Transportation in the 2000s
