= 45 class =

45 class or Class 45 may refer to:

- British Rail Class 45
- DRG Class 45
- Manila Railroad 45 class
- New South Wales 45 class locomotive
