= Class 800 =

Class 800 or 800 class may refer to:

- British Rail Class 800
- GSR Class 800
- JR Freight Class EH800
- Manila Railroad 800 class USA
- New South Wales 900/800 class railcar
- South Australian Railways 800 class
- SS 800 class
- 800 Series Shinkansen
