= Manila Railway 70 class =

Manila Railway/Railroad 70 class
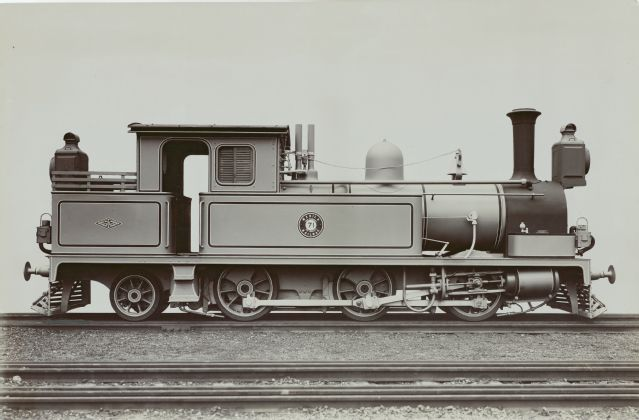
- Works photograph of Manila Railway No. 71
Type and origin
- Power type: Steam
- Designer: Horace L. Higgins
- Builder: North British Locomotive Company
- Build date: 1908–10
- Total produced: 24
Specifications
- Configuration
  - Whyte: 0-6-2T; 0-6-2TT (Pasudeco)
  - UIC: C1t
- Gauge: 1,067 mm (3 ft 6 in)
- Driver dia.: 40.5 in (1,030 mm)
- Wheelbase
  - Engine: 17.75 m (58 ft 3 in)
  - Drivers: 12 m (39 ft 4 in)
- Adhesive weight: 61,936 lb (27.650 long tons; 28,094 kg)
- Loco weight: 77,840 lb (34.75 long tons; 35,310 kg)
- Fuel type: Coal
- Water cap.: 3,000 US gal (11,000 L)
- Firebox
  - Type
  - Grate area: 16.5 sq ft (1.53 m^{2})
- Boiler
  - Type: Fire-tube boiler
- Boiler pressure: 180 psi (1,200 kPa)
- Heating surface
  - Firebox: 55 sq ft (5.1 m^{2})
  - Total surface
- Valve gear: Stephenson
Performance figures
- Tractive effort: 11,492 lbf (51.12 kN)
Career
- Operators: Manila Railway; Manila Railroad; Pampanga Sugar Development Company (Pasudeco)
- Number in class: 24
- Numbers: 71-95
- Locale: Entire MRR network
- Delivered: 1908–09
- First run: 1910
- Last run: Before 1947 (MRR); 1989 (Pasudeco)
- Preserved: 0
- Scrapped: 1922–61, before 2006
- Disposition: All presumed to be scrapped

The Manila Railway 70 class of 1908 was a class of at least twenty-two 0-6-2 side and well-tank locomotives built by the North British Locomotive Company. These locomotives were first put into service on a mainline during the late 1900s and early 1910s by the Manila Railway Company. Their primary purpose was to support the growing network and replace the aging Dagupan class engines. They were used on all the lines of the Manila Railway and its succeeding incarnation, the Manila Railroad. Over time, some locomotives were either scrapped or given to sugarcane plantations after being withdrawn. The last unit, No. 79, remained in service with the Pampanga Sugar Development Company as late as 1989.

== Background ==
In 1888, the newly-formed Manila Railway Company received 30 tank locomotives, also known as the Dagupan class by local railroad historians, built by two Glasgow-based locomotive manufacturers, Neilson & Company and Dübs & Company. The former built the A subclass, numbered 1 to 15, while the latter built the B subclass, numbered 16 to 30.

In 1903, these two companies merged with Sharp, Stewart & Company to form the North British Locomotive Company (NBL). In 1906, this newly-formed concern built the 100 class tender locomotives based on the designs of Horace L. Higgins, who was the sole general manager of the Manila Railway.

The 1900s saw an increase in the construction of several branch lines to the north of the Pasig River, including the Antipolo line. This line was infamous for its steep gradients, which restricted train speeds. While the 100 class was used for the flagship express train services on the PNR North Main Line, the Dagupan class was still used for regular passenger and freight services. However, these locomotives were already almost 20 years old at that time and were starting to show their age. For this reason, Higgins ordered additional 0-6-2 Branchliner-type tank locomotives from NBL in 1906, but their construction and entrance to service were delayed until 1908.

== Design ==
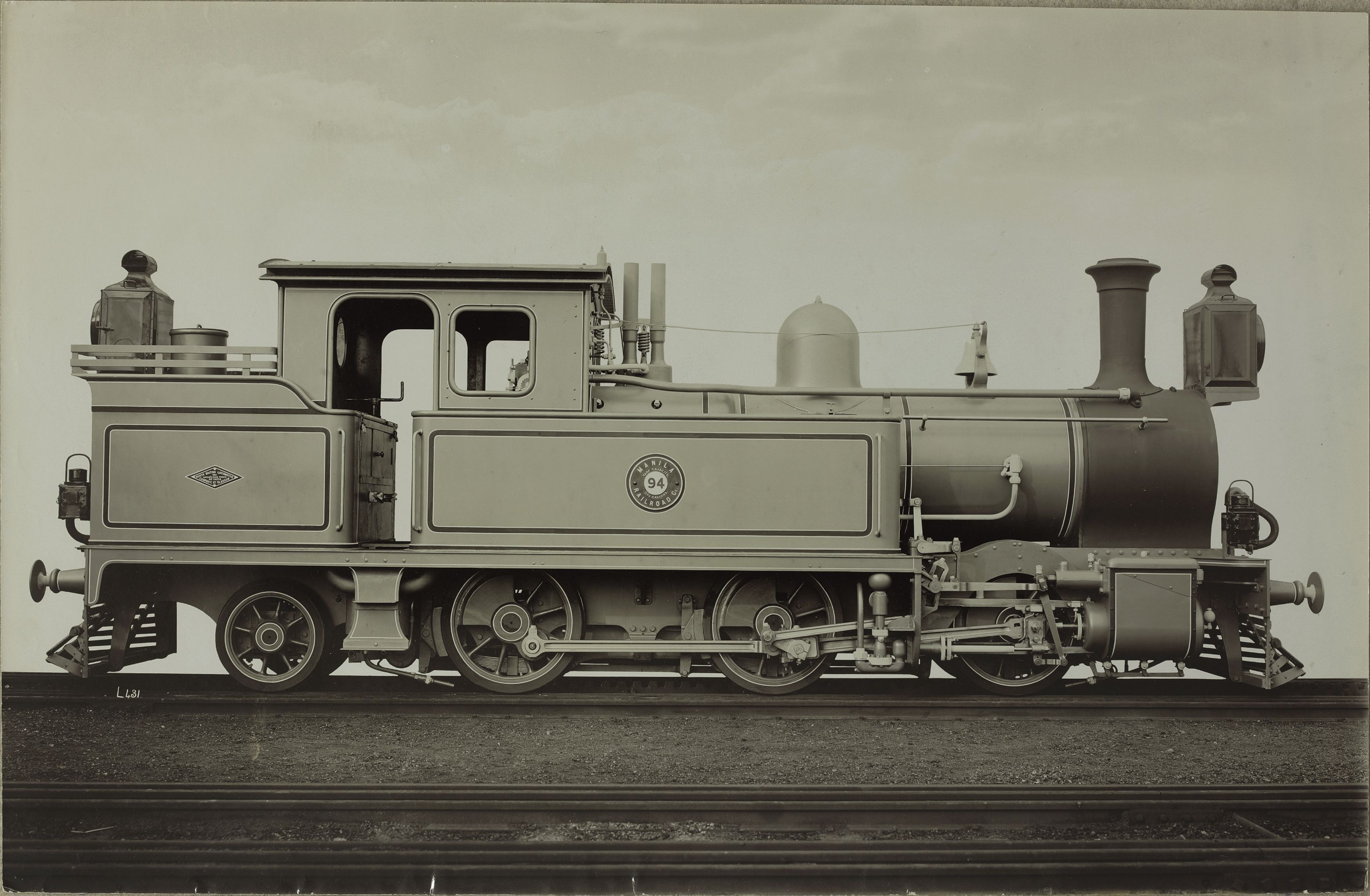
Works photograph of Manila Railway No. 94. Note the different type of valve gear.

As with the Dagupan class, the 70 class had both side and well tanks and was intended for mainline services of its time. However, these locomotives had a slimmer smokestack and a more solid cab, making it distinguished from the former. They were also designed to be faster and could carry heavier loads than its predecessor. Nos. 91-95 were manufactured with walschaerts valve gear.

The locomotives wore an entirely black livery during their service with the Manila Railway/Railroad. One, No. 79 had its cab and side tanks repainted orange after being acquired by Pasudeco.

== Service ==
The locomotives were first introduced in 1908 throughout the entire Manila Railway/Railroad network and ushered in the eventual retirement of the Dagupan class. In 1910, No. 84 was introduced into service on the Antipolo line.

=== Relegation and retirement ===
Similar to other older tank locomotives from Britain, the class became obsolete for mainline services when larger American-built locomotives arrived in the 1920s. However, they continued to serve the Manila Railroad well into the 1930s as a switcher or on the remaining services on the Antipolo line after the 160 and 300 classes were transferred to new branch lines following a Supreme Court of the Philippines ruling in 1916. The class was retired by 1947 as it was not given a letter classification by the MRR's Mechanical Department. By 1952, three locomotives, namely Nos. 79, 90, and 92, were stored in Tutuban.

Long after dieselization in 1956, No. 92 was the last known unit to be preserved in MRR and was awaiting its fate in Tutuban by 1960. It was hoped that it would be preserved longer, but ultimately, it was scrapped in 1961 at the MRR Caloocan Shops.

=== Pasudeco ===
Pasudeco acquired No. 79, and it was sometimes accompanied by a Slopeback tender if their No. 2, a 2-6-0 tender locomotive built by Baldwin, now on display in a shopping mall in Marikina, was not operational. The locomotive survived until 1989, although it was in a derelict state. It remains unknown if No. 79 is the second of two steam locomotives that Kautzor (2006) reported to have survived in their facilities, as its former railyard was off-limits. Otherwise, it is most likely that this locomotive was scrapped in the 1990s.
