= 100 class =

100 class or Class 100 may refer to:

- British Rail Class 100, diesel multiple units
- Manila Railway 100 class, 4-4-2 steam locomotives
- Renfe Class 100, high-speed train
