= Manila Railroad 300 class =

Manila Railroad 300 class (1914)
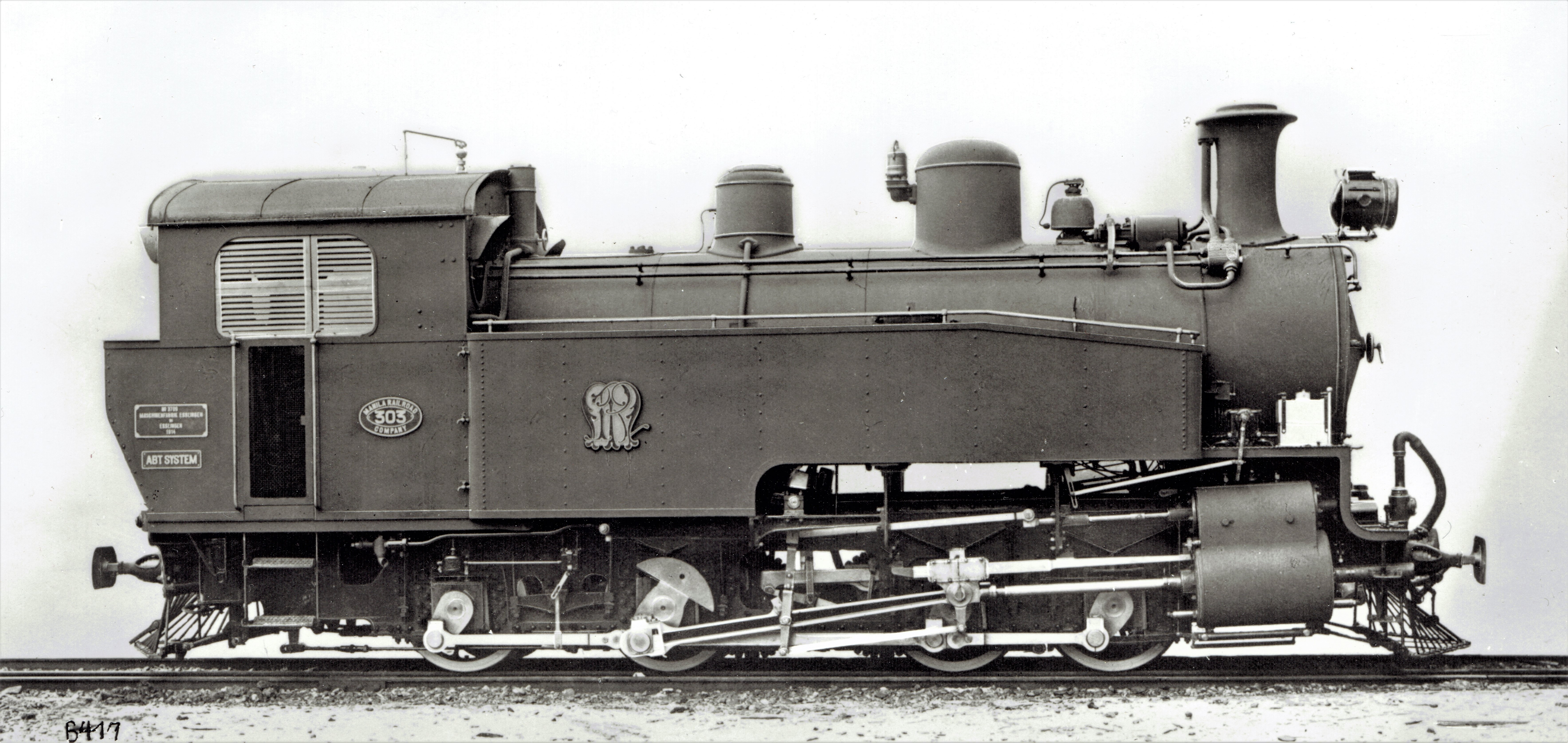
Type and origin
- Power type: Steam
- Designer: Maschinenfabrik Esslingen
- Builder: Maschinenfabrik Esslingen; Swiss Locomotive & Machine Works
- Build date: 1914
- Total produced: 5
Specifications
- Configuration
  - Whyte: 0-8-0T
  - UIC: Dt
- Gauge: 3 ft 6 in (1,067 mm)
- Fuel type: Oil
- Boiler
  - Type: Fire-tube boiler
- Boiler pressure: 160 psi (1,100 kPa)
- Superheater
  - Heating area: 352 sq ft (32.7 m^{2})
- Valve gear: Walschaerts
- Couplers: Buffers and chain
Career
- Operators: Manila Railroad Company
- Class: Manila Railway/Railroad 300 class Manila Railroad R class (post-scrapping)
- Number in class: 6
- Numbers: 301-306
- Locale: Manila (province), La Union, Benguet
- Delivered: 1914
- Last run: 1917 (Antipolo line); 1945 (Antipolo line)
- Retired: 1945
- Preserved: 0
- Disposition: All scrapped

The Manila Railroad 300 class (Note: Although rail operations in the Philippines were controlled by Horace L. Higgins' Manila Railway Company, stock such the 300 class were already referred by the new Manila Railroad branding, having entered service after 1909. Both are predecessors to the modern Philippine National Railways.) of 1914 were cog locomotives used for the Antipolo line and the Aringay–Baguio branch of the PNR North Main Line. These were also known in the railroad's mechanical department as the R class.

Built by German manufacturer Maschinenfabrik Esslingen and Swiss Locomotive & Machine Works of Winterthur in 1914, they were the latter of only two classes of German-built locomotives that entered service in the Philippines. These were either destroyed during World War II or scrapped in 1945. Only the builder's plate of No. 306 survive to the present day after being kept and restored in the California State Railroad Museum.

== Background ==
=== German tranvia boxcabs ===
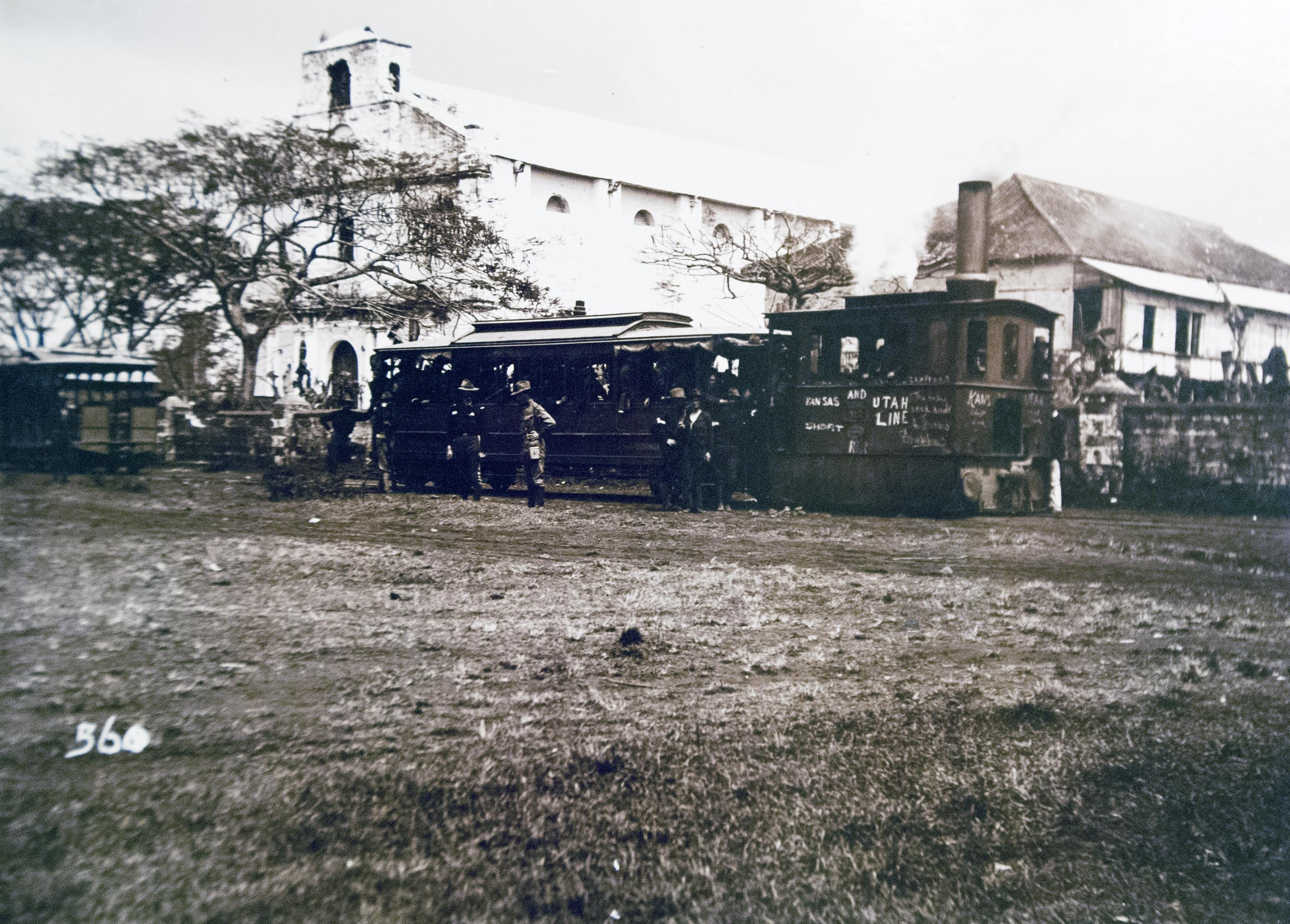
One German-built tram boxcab in the 1900s.

The first tram locomotives were ordered in the 1880s for the Compañia de los Tranvías de Filipinas or the Philippine Tramway Company. Although its manufacturers remain unknown, it was mentioned by company founder and mayor of Manila Jacobo Zóbel y Zangroniz that the locomotives were German-made. These were retired in 1905 after the Tranvía system was electrified and at least two were sold to the Insular Lumber Company of Negros Occidental.

=== Antipolo line ===
The Antipolo line was a railroad line between Manila and Antipolo, then part of the Manila province. It is notorious for having steep terrain and tight turning curves, which justified the use of 3 ft 6 in gauge railways. The line was operated between the late 1900s and early 1910s with Manila Railway 70 class tank locomotives.

Horace L. Higgins, then head of the British-owned Manila Railway Company, ordered four Kitson-Meyers from Kitson & Company, which would become the Manila Railroad 160 class in 1914. He also ordered six locomotives from two manufacturers. Maschinenfabrik Esslingen built nos. 301 to 305, while Swiss manufacturer built no. 306 Mirador.

=== Aringay line ===
The Aringay–Baguio line was a 40 km (25 mi) rail line that started construction in 1911. Like the Antipolo line, it also climbed relatively steep terrain as its main objective was to connect Baguio with Manila via Aringay. It was never finished due to lack of funds of the succeeding Manila Railroad. However, the line managed to enter through a small portion of Benguet in the municipality of Tuba.

== Design ==
The 300 class the only cog locomotives that entered Philippine service and the second to the last tank locomotive class to enter service. The last was the Manila Railroad 126 class, which were also the last European locomotives to enter service until 1966. Meanwhile, it was the first oil-burning locomotive in Philippine service, followed by the larger tender locomotives of the state-owned Manila Railroad.

Built with the Abt rack system, the six locomotives were used to pull trains on steep terrain between Manila and Antipolo. The locomotives ran along Cape gauge tracks, adopted for interoperability with the rest of the Manila Railroad network. This makes the Antipolo and Aringay lines some of the widest track gauges that used the Abt system alongside those used by the Mount Lyell Mining & Railway Company in Tasmania, Australia.

Due to its inclination to be used on steep climbs, the locomotives appeared to lean forward while running on regular track.

== Service ==
The 300 class entered service together with the Manila Railroad 160 class in 1914. In 1917, operations on the Antipolo line halted due to the controversial run of the 160 class Kitson Meyers. Since then, the two classes continued operating separately with the 160 class on the Pagsanjan line and the 300 class on the Aringay line. It was signified by No. 306 being named Mirador after one of the mountains in Benguet. Although the line was never finished, the 300 class was used until 1945 when they were either destroyed during World War II or scrapped in the case of Mirador.

=== Recent history ===
While all 300 class locomotives were scrapped, the number plate of No. 306 Mirador managed to survive to the present day. The locomotive was scrapped in 1945 and the plate was purchased in the 1970s by a member of the Railway & Locomotive Historical Society, who preserved and polished the number plate with the help of the California State Railroad Museum. In recent years, the plate was put into auction on eBay.
