= Dagupan station =

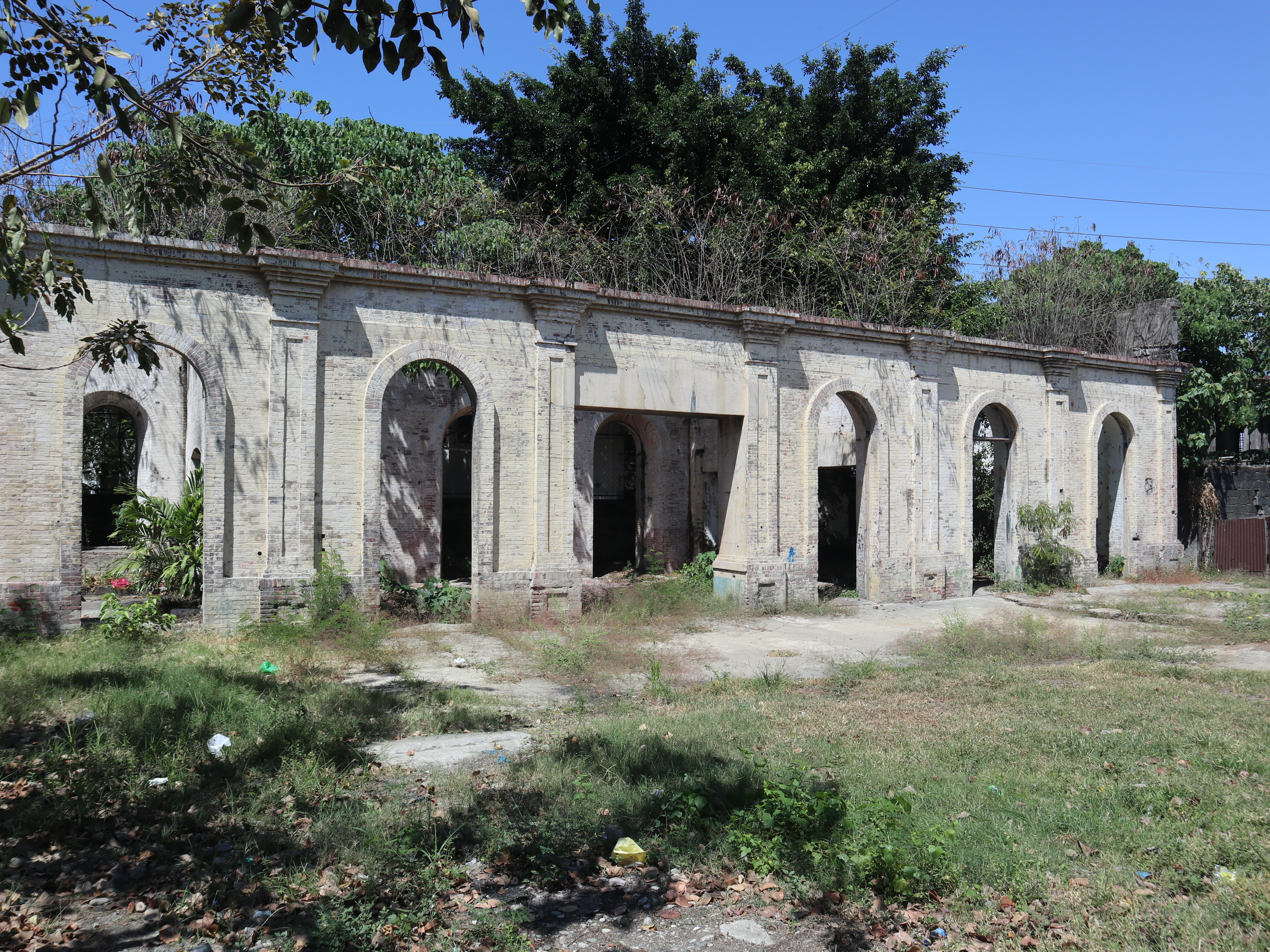
- Ruins of the old Dagupan station building, 2023

General information
- Location: Dagupan, Pangasinan; Philippines
- Coordinates: 16°02′45″N 120°20′43″E
- Owner: Philippine National Railways (formerly Manila Railroad Company)
- Platforms: 4 (2 island, 2 side)
- Tracks: 6

Other information
- Status: Closed

History
- Opened: November 24, 1892
- Closed: 1988
Location

Dagupan station was a terminus of the Philippine National Railways Northrail in Dagupan, Pangasinan.

== Station layout ==
Dagupan station had six tracks. It also had multiple platforms: one island platform at the original station building, two at the new station building, and one at the eastern entrance road. The new station building, made of rubble stone, is located just south of the original station building. The original station building's entrance was situated along Pangasinan–La Union Road (present-day A.B. Fernandez East Avenue), between an engineering office and a Delco plant. The station was also surrounded by access roads.

== History ==
Dagupan station was opened on November 24, 1892 as the northern terminus of the Manila–Dagupan Ferrocarril Line of the Manila Railroad Company. The line later became the PNR North Main Line.

A new station building was built, when it became an intermediate station as the line was extended north to La Union.

The station became a terminus once again when the Dagupan–San Fernando line closed in 1983. It eventually ceased operations entirely with the closure of the Dagupan–Tarlac line in 1988.

== Aftermath ==
Although the North Main Line was abandoned in 1997, both station buildings still stand to this day. The original station building is currently occupied by a basketball court, while its platform area currently serves as a dumpsite. The access roads to the station are now known as PNR Road, Metro Rail Road, and Freight Road. Houses currently occupy the station's premises.
