= Manila Railway Dagupan class =

Railway Class

Manila Railway Dagupan class Manila Railroad A and B classes.
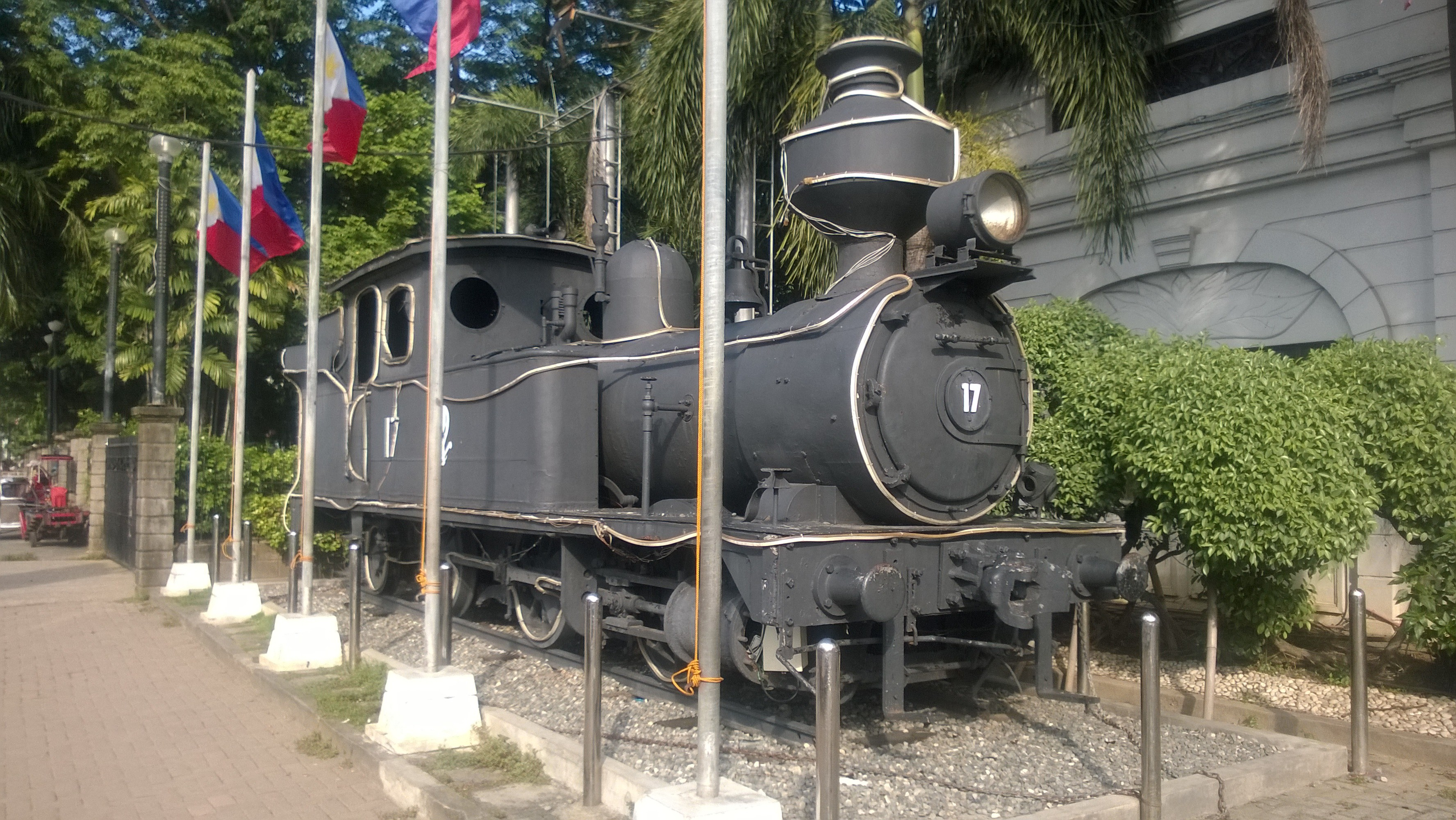
- No. 17 Urdaneta, the sole surviving example.
Type and origin
- Power type: Steam
- Designer: Horace L. Higgins
- Builder: Neilson & Company; Dübs & Company
- Order number: 3898-4001 (Neilson A); 2576-89, 2690-94 (Dübs B)
- Build date: 1888-90
- Total produced: 30
Specifications
- Configuration
  - Whyte: 2-4-2T (Neilson A); 0-6-2T (Dübs B)
  - UIC: 1B1t (Neilson A); C1t (Dübs B)
- Gauge: 3 ft 6 in (1,067 mm)
- Loco weight: 32 short tons (29 t; 64,000 lb)
- Fuel type: Wood
- Valve gear: Stephenson
Performance figures
- Maximum speed: 20 mph (32 km/h)
Career
- Operators: Manila Railroad Company; Franklin Baker Company
- Number in class: 15 (Neilson A); 15 (Dübs B)
- Numbers: 1-30
- Locale: Manila; Northern Luzon; Central Luzon; Calabarzon
- Delivered: 1888-90
- First run: 1892
- Withdrawn: 1963
- Preserved: 1
- Scrapped: 1899, 1945, 1963
- Disposition: No. 17 Urdaneta is preserved in Dagupan.

The Manila Railway Dagupan class comprised thirty side tank locomotives. They were built for the Manila Railway Company between 1888 and 1890, and were the first true mainline locomotives in service of the Ferrocarril de Manila a Dagupan inter-city rail line, succeeding two of five Manila-class light-duty locomotives. One of these locomotives, No. 17 Urdaneta, survives today on static display in an open-air museum in Dagupan, Pangasinan.

== Background ==
The proposal for the Luzon railroad system was made by Don Eduardo Lopez Navarro in 1875. The Spanish East Indies government approved the proposal in 1880. The company then invited bids from concessionaires, and the franchising rights were won by the British-owned Manila Railway Company. To reduce costs, the railway system would be built in a 3 ft 6 in (1,067 mm) narrow-gauge.

During the construction of the line, light-duty Manila class locomotives manufactured by Hunslet Engine Company were used for transporting passengers between Manila and Bulacan. However, the design was not suitable for long-distance travel. Hence, the British owners of the Manila Railway ordered several larger locomotives from Scotland, and the orders were won by two Glasgow-based manufacturers, Neilson & Company and Dübs & Company. These locomotives will be later known to the Filipino railroad historians as the Dagupan class, after the northern terminus of the line.

== Design ==
The Dagupan class contained two identical designs, each with a different wheel arrangement. Fifteen were built in respective subclass, distinguished from each other by their livery and smokestack.

=== Neilson A subclass ===
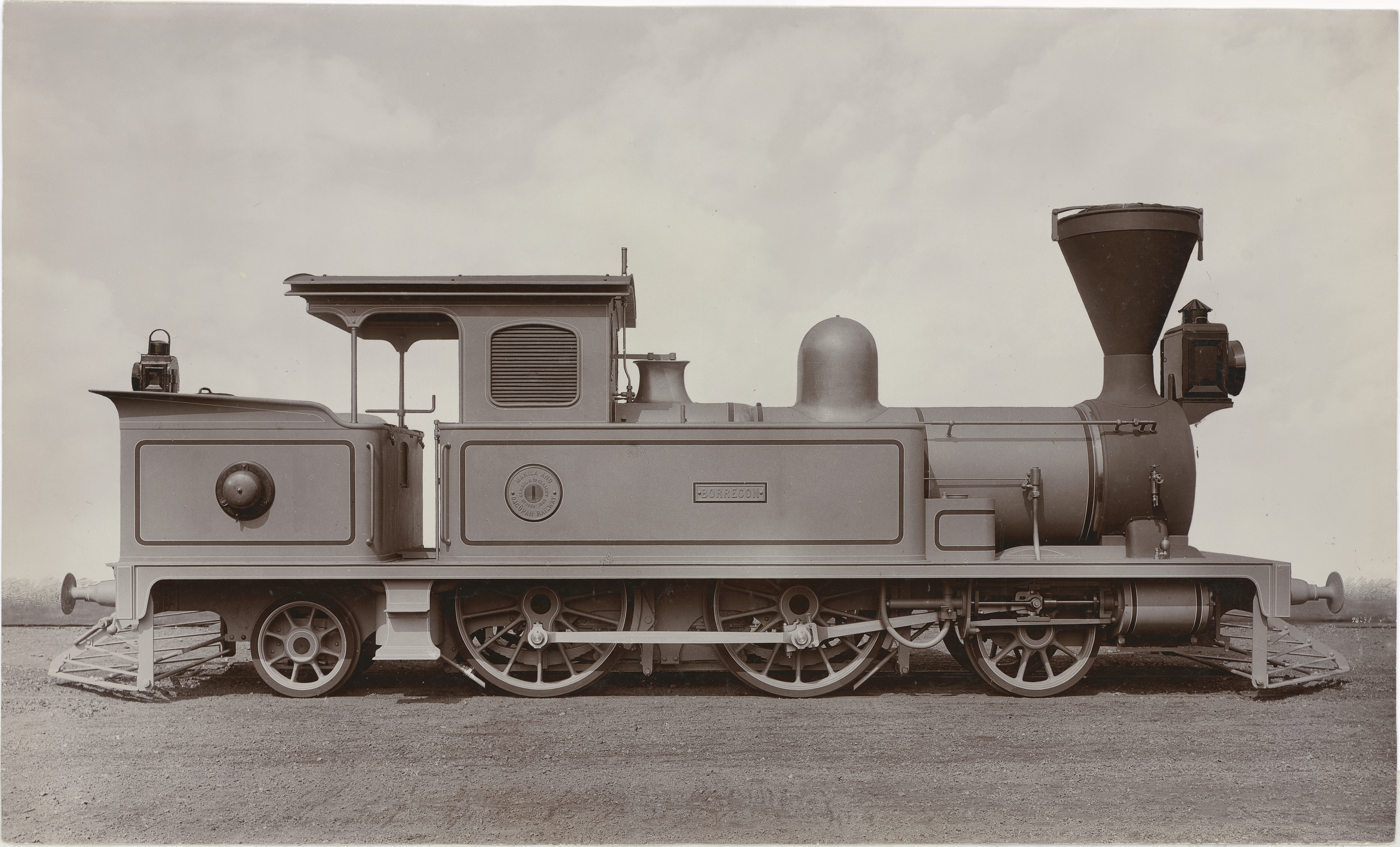
No. 1 Borrecon, the first numbered locomotive in the Philippines.

The earlier of the two subclass, exemplified by the No. 1 Borrecon in the accompanying picture, was built by Neilson in 1888, and was later classified by the Manila Railroad as the A subclass. It was distinguished from the later B subclass in that it featured a 2-4-2 wheel arrangement, absence of a bell on the front and a different type of smokestack. University of the Philippines historian Leonardo Q. Liongson discovered postage stamps that indicate that these locomotives were originally painted black, with the side tanks colored either metallic silver or white, and with an azure lining.

=== Dübs B subclass ===
The second design, represented by the only surviving unit Urdaneta, was built by Dübs and delivered to the Manila Railway in 1890, and was later classified by the Manila Railroad as the B subclass. These locomotives had a more complicated design compared to their earlier Neilson counterparts. They featured a 0-6-2 wheel arrangement, a bell and one of the boilers had a whistle attached to the sandbox. The smokestack was also larger than the previous type and had a different spark arrestor and a narrower exhaust from the smokebox. Some designs, such as the one used on the Stotsenburg Unlimited, featured a simple smokestack design without a spark arrestor.

During their service with the Manila Railroad, the nameplates of the named locomotives, such as Urdaneta, were removed and replaced by the monogram of the Manila Railroad Company. To distinguish it from the A subclass, these locomotives were fully painted black except for a red-colored lining near the couplers.

== Service ==
The Neilson A subclass started trial runs on the North Main Line (previously known as Ferrocarril de Manila a Dagupan) by c. 1888, while the B subclass entering service by 1890. Each opened section was also available for trains to use. During the Philippine–American War, these locomotives were utilized to pull trains that transported United States Army troops towards Central and Northern Luzon, in pursuit of the leaders of the Philippine Revolution, including Emilio Aguinaldo. One such train was destroyed near Angeles City, with the locomotive being partially damaged; its status after the war is unknown.

At the start of the American colonial period, the Dagupan class were used on express train services such as the Stotsenburg Unlimited, plying the Manila to Fort Stotsenburg route in Pampanga. In the 1900s, they became the primary locomotives on the network and carried both passengers and freight. According to the Railway Gazette, they carried both first-class cars with proper windows and seats, and third-class cars, which were just boxcars that were supposedly used for freight trains.

=== Retirement ===
The Dagupan class became outdated for flagship services by the 1910s and the 1920s, due to the arrival of larger tender locomotives from British and later American manufacturers. Consequently, they were assigned to switching duties along with the 70 class, which featured the same wheel configuration as the B subclass. Horace L. Higgins, the Manila Railroad engineer and general manager, stated that the Manila Railway concession desired more substantial locomotives weighing between 40 and 45 short tons (36 and 41 t; 80,000 and 90,000 lb) and held the Spanish government accountable for cost overruns.

The Manila Railroad repainted some locomotives black to signify their service, as they were still in use on switching and short-line duties. No. 17 Urdaneta was one such locomotive. According to F. Unson, the mechanical superintendent of the Manila Railroad, three locomotives were still in service as of 1947, almost 60 years after they were first put into service. They were decommissioned alongside other steam locomotives beginning on August 15, 1956, as the Manila Railroad transitioned to dieselization.

=== Preservation ===
After its retirement in 1956, No. 17 Urdaneta was given to the Franklin Baker Company at their plant in San Pablo, Laguna. It served as a switcher there until the lines were removed sometime after 1959. The locomotive was then returned to the ownership of the Philippine National Railways. Initially, it was displayed in front of Tutuban station in Manila, but was later transferred to Dagupan in 2005. The other two surviving units were scrapped by 1963.

== Accidents ==
On June 23, 1937, No. 3 was involved in a fatal accident at a level crossing in Binakayan, Cavite. The locomotive was hauling a works train when it collided with United States Navy Mail Truck No. 1530. The protective barriers on the level crossing had been removed months earlier after its decommissioning, which led to the accident. At the time of reporting, two people had died, and two others were in critical condition.
