= Manila Railway 100 class =

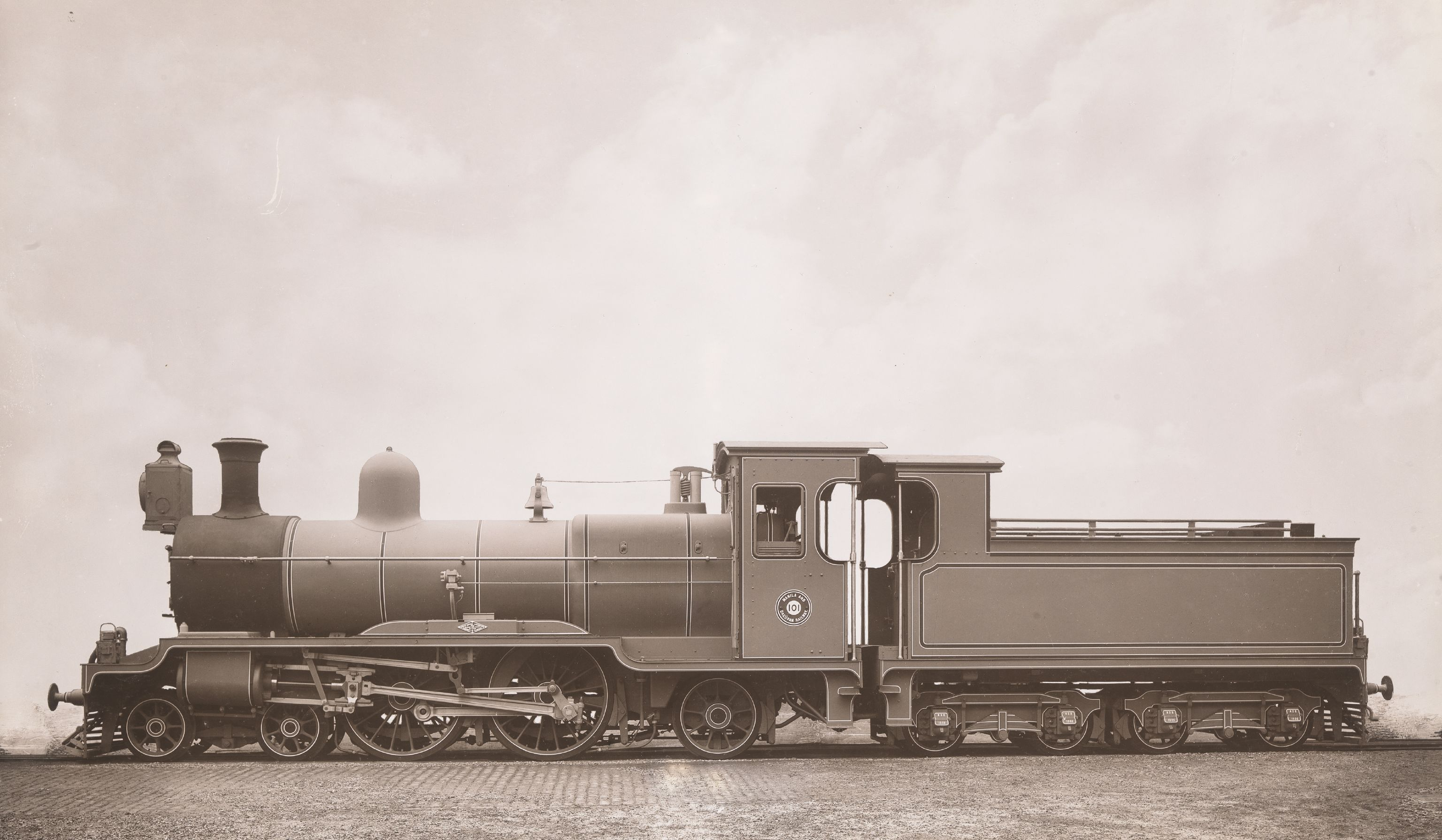
- Works photograph of Manila Railway No. 101
Type and origin
- Power type: Steam
- Designer: Horace L. Higgins
- Builder: North British Locomotive Company
- Serial number: 17410-414
- Build date: 1906
- Total produced: 5
Specifications
- Configuration
  - Whyte: 4-4-2
  - UIC: 2'B1n2
- Gauge: 3 ft 6 in (1,067 mm)
- Driver dia.: 60 in (1,500 mm)
- Wheelbase: 13.27 m (43 ft 6 in)
  - Engine: 6.45 m (21 ft 2 in)
  - Drivers: 3.66 m (12 ft 0 in)
- Adhesive weight: 47,712 lb (21.300 long tons; 21,642 kg)
- Loco weight: 91,392 lb (40.800 long tons; 41,455 kg)
- Tender weight: 71,680 lb (32.00 long tons; 32,510 kg)
- Total weight: 163,072 lb (72.800 long tons; 73,968 kg)
- Fuel type: Coal
- Water cap.: 3,000 US gal (11,000 L)
- Firebox
  - Type
  - Grate area: 16.5 sq ft (1.53 m^{2})
- Boiler
  - Type: Fire-tube boiler
- Boiler pressure: 180 psi (1,200 kPa)
- Heating surface
  - Firebox: 107 sq ft (9.9 m^{2})
  - Total surface
- Valve gear: Walschaerts
Performance figures
- Tractive effort: 15,667 lbf (69.69 kN)
Career
- Operators: Manila Railway; Manila Railroad
- Number in class: 5
- Numbers: 101-105
- Locale: Metro Manila; Central Luzon; Ilocos Region
- Delivered: 1906
- First run: 1909
- Last run: 1949
- Preserved: 0
- Scrapped: c. 1950
- Disposition: All scrapped

The Manila Railway 100 class of 1906 was a class of five 4-4-2 Atlantic type steam locomotives built by the North British Locomotive Company for the Manila Railway Company, a predecessor of the Philippine National Railways. They were the flagship locomotives of the Manila Railway from the late 1900s to the 1910s and were the first class of tender locomotives to operate in the Philippines. They hauled the Baguio Special, an express service between Manila and Baguio via Damortis station in Rosario, La Union.

The locomotives were relegated to freight services in the 1920s, hauling sugarcane trains in Central Luzon until they were withdrawn and scrapped after 1948.

== Background ==
In the early years of its operation, Ferrocarril de Manila a Dagupan (now the North Main Line) of the Manila Railway Company was solely operated by tank locomotives that used wood fuel instead of coal. Horace L. Higgins, a British engineer who was the head of the Manila Railway at the time, ordered the modernization of its entire fleet. This would include the acquisition of bigger locomotives of the 40–45 t (88,000–99,000 lb) range and the purchase of heavier tracks.

During this period, Neilson and Company and Dübs and Company, manufacturers of the preceding Dagupan class locomotives, amalgamated with Sharp, Stewart and Company to form the North British Locomotive Company. The newly formed company was then approached by the Manila Railway to build what would become the 100 class of locomotives, as well as a series of tank locomotives of the 70 class.

== Design ==
Having entered service in 1906, the 100 class was the first tender locomotive class in the Philippines. They utilised the 4-4-2 Atlantic wheel arrangement, which was popular among the railways in Britain through the first decade of the twentieth century, especially for express passenger train service.

They were built with the intention of meeting the expectations of Higgins, especially for their weight. Weighing 41 metric tons (40 long tons) for the locomotive alone, they were 28 percent heavier than their predecessors, which weighed 32 metric tons (31 long tons). Along with their four-axle tender, they had a total weight of 73 metric tons (72 long tons).

One of the most notable features of these locomotives was the use of a tender cab. This feature would later influence the design of the 2-8-0 Consolidation type 130 class of 1912 and the first batch of the 4-6-0 Ten-wheeler type Manila Railroad 45 class of 1919. Another notable feature was the Americanized tender design, which had bogies instead of three rigid axles as used in most British tender locomotives of that era.

== Service ==
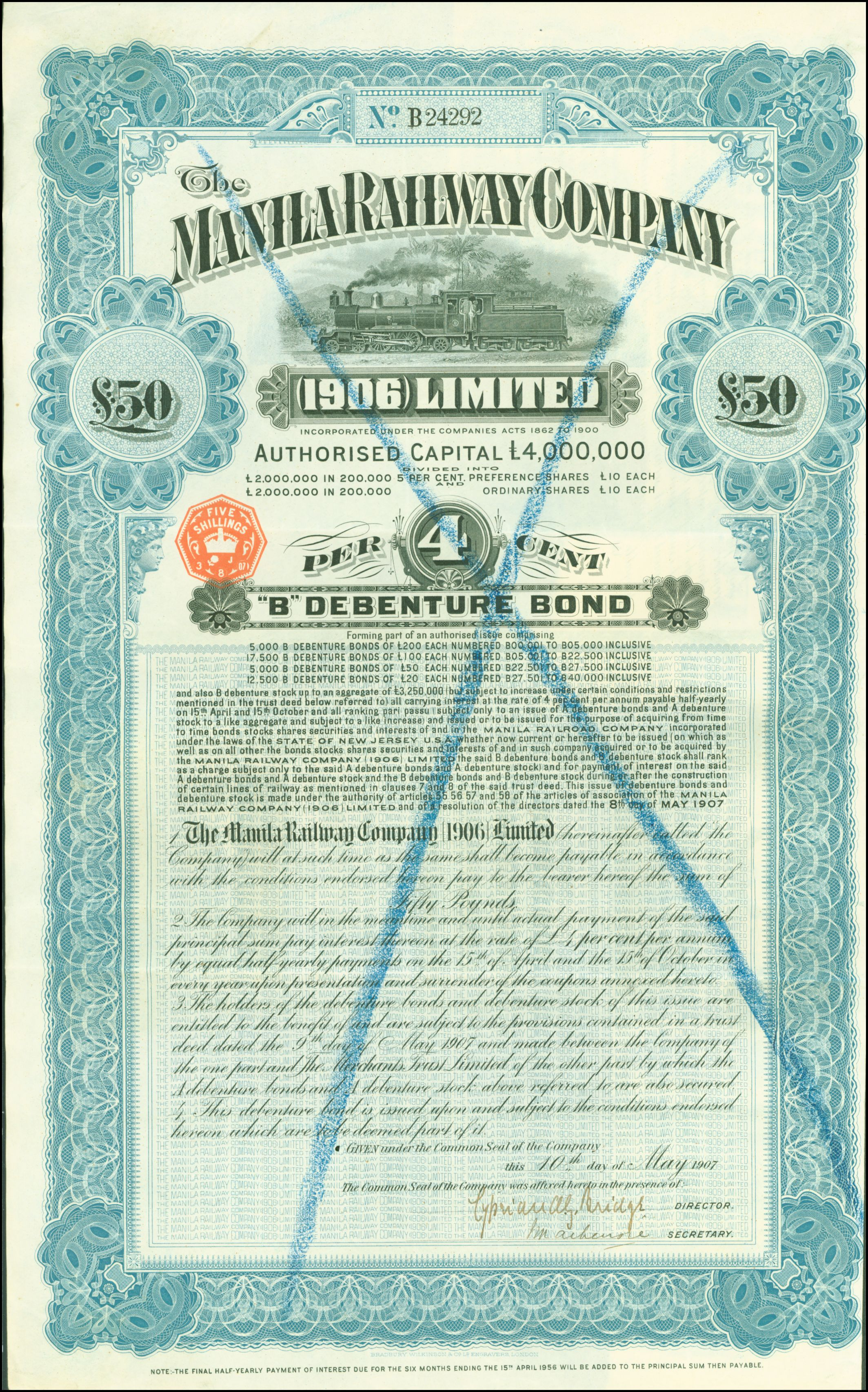
A Manila Railway bond of 1907 showing the 100 class

Upon their introduction, the 100 class locomotives were promoted as the flagship of the Manila Railway, and, as later stated by The Locomotive Magazine, had a brief heyday serving as the premier express passenger locomotives. They appeared on various advertisements for the Baguio Special, a mixed train-bus service that operated between Manila and Baguio via Damortis station in Rosario, La Union. This particular service was considered as the company's premier offering on the North Main Line, transporting tourists between the two cities in nine hours with an average speed of 30 kilometers per hour (19 mph). The class was also featured on the header of the Manila Railway's bond documents.

=== Retirement ===
By 1916, the Insular Government acquired the Manila Railway and merged it with the New Jersey–based Manila Railroad Company. Henry Bayard McCoy, a United States Army colonel and a member of the Republican National Committee for the Philippines, replaced Higgins as the general manager.

Under the new administration, the company began the acquisition of more powerful locomotives from the United States. These newer locomotives began entering service by 1919 and largely replaced the ageing British locomotives in mainline service for the next few decades. The Baguio Special and the freshly inaugurated Bicol Express between Manila and Quezon province were then hauled by the newly acquired 45 class. Since 1922, the 100 and 120 classes were relegated to pull sugarcane trains.

The 100 class was last recorded in 1947 when F. Unson, the superintendent of the Manila Railroad Mechanical Department at the time, reported that at least one class member was still operational.

In 1949, ten Manila Railroad 100 class locomotives with a 4-8-2 wheel arrangement, built by the Vulcan Iron Works of Pennsylvania, were put into service to replace seven of the 170 class locomotives, also with a 4-8-2 wheel arrangement, that were destroyed during World War II. These locomotives ran successfully on both passenger and freight services on the North Main Line, rendering the original 100 class Atlantics obsolete and prompting their retirement. Sometime after, the Manila Railroad ordered the surviving units to be scrapped.
