= Manila Railroad 800 class USA =

Locomotives of the Manila Railroad Company

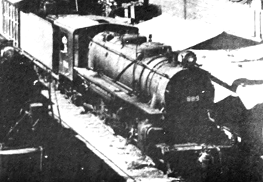
- Manila Railroad 889 in the mid-1940s.
Type and origin
- Power type: Steam
- Designer: US Army Transportation Corps
- Builder: Vulcan Iron Works, USA; American Locomotive Company
- Build date: 1944-45
- Total produced: 40 (Vulcan); 5 (Alco)
Specifications
- Configuration
  - Whyte: 2-8-2
  - UIC: 1'D1'h2
- Gauge: 3 ft 6 in (1,067 mm)
- Leading dia.: 26 in (660 mm)
- Driver dia.: 48 in (1,219 mm)
- Trailing dia.: 30 in (762 mm)
- Wheelbase
- Length: 59 ft 5 1/2 in (18,123 mm)
- Adhesive weight: 36 t (79,000 lb)
- Loco weight: 52 t (115,000 lb)
- Tender weight: 44 t (97,000 lb)
- Total weight: 96 t (212,000 lb)
- Tender type: Four-axle tender
- Fuel type: Oil, coal
- Fuel capacity: 18,000 lb (8,200 kg)
- Water cap.: 5,000 US gal (19,000 L)
- Firebox
  - Type: Standard fire-tube firebox
  - Grate area: 35 sq ft (3.3 m^{2})
- Boiler pressure: 185 psi (1,280 kPa)
- Heating surface
  - Firebox: 115 sq ft (10.7 m^{2})
  - Tubes and flues: 1,256 sq ft (116.7 m^{2})
  - Total surface: 1,371 sq ft (127.4 m^{2})
- Superheater
  - Type: Fire-tube
  - Heating area: 374 sq ft (34.7 m^{2})
- Cylinders: 2, outside
- Cylinder size: 16 in × 24 in (406 mm × 610 mm)
- Valve gear: Walschaerts
- Valve type: Piston valves
- Couplers: Janney couplers
Performance figures
- Maximum speed: 53 mph (85 km/h)
- Tractive effort: 20,100 lbf (89 kN)
- Factor of adh.: 3.98
Career
- Operators: Luzon Military Railway; Manila Railroad Company; Philippine National Railways
- Number in class: 45
- Numbers: Vulcan 851-890; Alco 891-895
- Nicknames: USA, Vulcans
- Locale: Entire MRR network
- Delivered: 1944–45
- First run: 1945
- Withdrawn: 1989
- Preserved: 0
- Scrapped: 1956–90s
- Disposition: Scrapped

The Manila Railroad 800 class USA were 45 United States Army Transportation Corps class S118 2-8-2 steam locomotives used by the Manila Railroad Company and the Philippine National Railways. Originally built by Vulcan Iron Works and the American Locomotive Works for the United States Army during the Second Philippines Campaign, they were later used to pull freight trains and temporary passenger trains. After the dieselization of the Manila Railroad network in the mid-1950s, they were relegated to work trains until the last unit was scrapped after appearing in a 1989 World War II movie.

== Background ==
According to a 1952 report that would later gain fruition as the Mindanao Railway, around 75% of all steam locomotives used by the Manila Railroad have been destroyed during World War II between 1941 and 1945. During this time period, the US Army ordered 45 USATC class S118 for the Philippines. This is because the USATC S200 Class design does not fit with the narrow-gauge track in the country. 40 units were ordered from Vulcan Iron Works of Wilkes-Barre, Pennsylvania while five were ordered from the American Locomotive Company.

== Design ==
The 800 class was the first to adopt the Janney coupler as its primary railway coupling mechanism. Locomotives built prior used buffers and chain couplers and were later fitted with Janney couplers during their reconstruction. The locomotives were also given the nickname USA, after US Army markings on the tenders. There are no other known notable features, with the 2-8-2 Mikado type being a common freight locomotive wheel arrangement during the era.

The 800 class' engine unit was lighter by 4,000 lb (1,800 kg) compared to other S118s.

== Service ==
The delivery and eventual journey of three named locomotives, two of which were named after Mark Twain characters, was one of the primary subjects of the 1945 documentary Hannibal Victory. The titular 10,000 short tons (9,100 t) Victory ship carried Nos. 866 Tom Sawyer, 867 Hannibella and 875 Huckleberry Finn from San Francisco to Luzon during the Second Philippines Campaign. After the war in the Philippines ended, they were later made into freight trains as well as temporary passenger trains carrying so-called "zombie cars" or gondola cars converted to passenger cars with a tent as a roof. This practice continued well into the 1950s as noted in a 1952 report, though these were slowly replaced by new 7-series coaches.

This report however meant the demise of steam traction as the Manila Railroad transitioned into diesel power starting in 1954. The locomotives were later retired from mainline service on August 12, 1956 as these were rendered "obsolete" by the media covering the subject. They were then relegated to work trains and were eventually scrapped over the course of the next decades. The last known appearance of the locomotive was in the 1989 Japanese war film Harimao about the Japanese occupation of Malaya. The film featured one of the Vulcans as well as Manila Railroad 45 class No. 62. They were presumed to be scrapped in the years after since neither of these locomotives exist.

=== Legacy ===
The PNR 900 class diesel locomotives has its numbering follow this class instead of the traditional four-digit scheme used by the Manila Railroad.
