= Manila Railway Manila class =

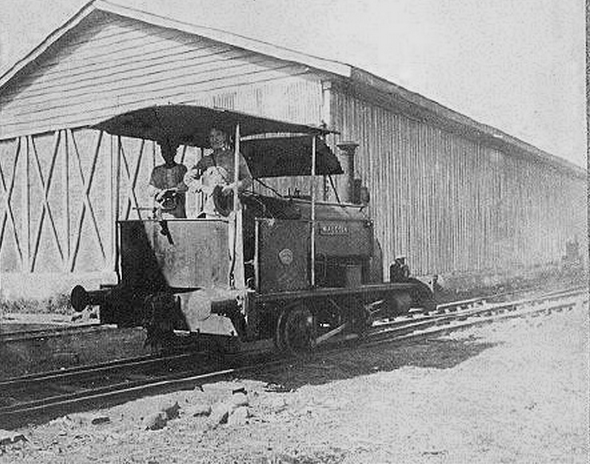
- Hunslet Malecon, a first-generation Manila-class locomotive in 1888.
Type and origin
- Power type: Steam
- Builder: Hunslet Engine Company
- Build date: 1885-86
- Total produced: 5
Specifications
- Configuration
  - Whyte: 0-4-0ST (original); 0-4-0ST+T (CAT Railways Manila)
  - UIC: Bt
- Gauge: 3 ft 6 in (1,067 mm)
- Fuel type: Wood
Performance figures
- Maximum speed: 20 mph (32 km/h)
Career
- Operators: Manila Railway Company; CAT Railways
- Number in class: 5
- Locale: Manila; Tarlac
- Delivered: 1885-88
- First run: 1886 (I); 1888 (II)
- Withdrawn: 1927 (Manila Railroad); 1980s (CAT Railways)
- Preserved: 1
- Scrapped: c. 1900s (first batch)
- Disposition: One preserved, remainder scrapped

The Manila Railway Manila class of 1885 were a class of five 0-4-0 saddle tank locomotives built by the British manufacturer Hunslet Engine Company, and were the first locomotive class in Philippine service. Three of these locomotives were built as light-duty switchers for the Manila Tranvia system while two more were built for the Ferrocarril de Manila a Dagupan inter-city rail services in the 1890s.

Manila, the fourth and flagship locomotive of the class, was sold to Bamban Sugar Central in 1927. The company was reorganized into the Central Azucarrera de Tarlac and it served with its CAT Railways Division until the closure of the line between 1988 and 1991.

== Background ==
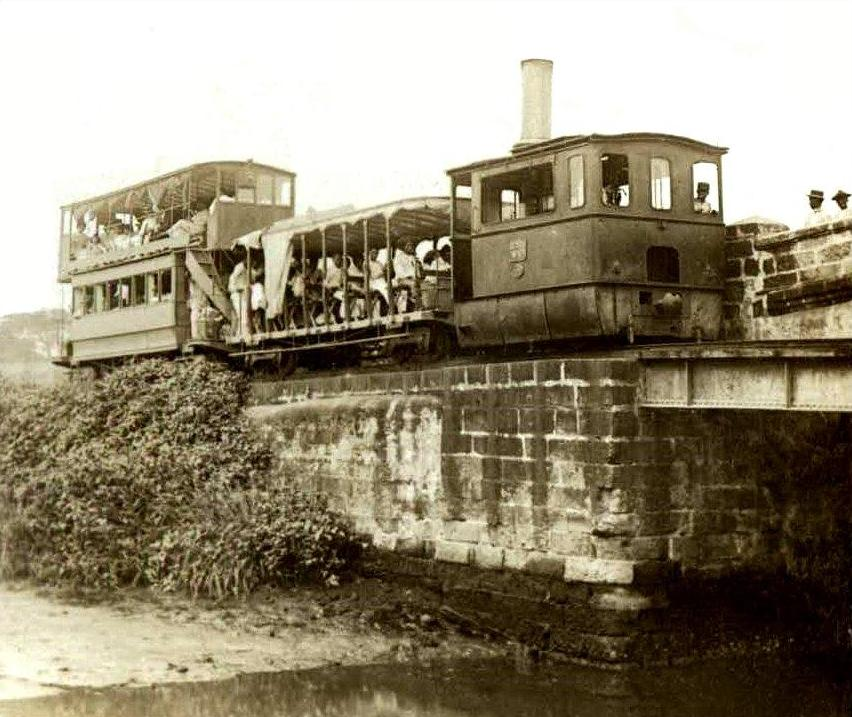
This German-built boxcab steam locomotive was used alongside the Hunslet class in Manila.

The Manila tranvias were the first form of rail transport in the Philippines. The first line was opened between Manila and Malabon in 1884. Tram carriages were initially pulled by horses prior to the purchase of steam locomotives the following year. At the same time, an inter-city rail system, which would become the Ferrocarril de Manila–Dagupan was also in planning stages with construction began later in the 1880s and was opened in 1892.

The first Tranvia system was plagued with issues primarily with the horses themselves stopping in the middle of the street at random. To solve this issue as well as to increase the efficiency of the rail system, steam locomotives were ordered from Germany to pull the tram carriages. Additional steam locomotives were ordered from the British manufacturer Hunslet Engine Company to complement them as switchers.

== Design ==
The first batch design was simple, with a small steam engine with an open cab resembling a generator set on wheels. The cab was covered with sheet metal to protect the engineers against sunlight and rainfall to make it suitable for operations in the tropical climate of the Philippines. It also had a relatively small smokestack without spark arrestors.

The second design of Manila and Dagupan was comparatively larger and heavier, resembling a proper tank locomotive for mainline services. It had a proper solid cab, a more visible boiler and a larger smokestack with spark arrestors. During its service with the Central Azucarera de Tarlac, Manila had a small two-axle tender which carries additional fuel on board as it carries sugarcane freight from one end of the plantation to the other.

== Service ==
The first batch of light-duty locomotives entered service in 1888, namely, Bikan Gowan, Santa Lucia and Malecon. It was operated alongside four German-made boxcab steam locomotives and carried 8 light coaches with them. The second batch of locomotives entered service the same year, and the two units were used on the first Manila–Dagupan train in 1892.

Some units were later destroyed during the Philippine–American War and were scrapped. During the time of transfer of ownership from the British to the American government in 1916, Manila was the only known locomotive of the class to have survived. It remained in service with the new Manila Railroad until 1927, when it was transferred to the newly formed Central Azucarrera de Tarlac. It was operated by the company's CAT Railways until the 1980s. Manila was given to Hozugawa Live Steam Club upon the closure of the line sometime between 1988, when all rail services in Northern and Central Luzon have closed; and 1991, after the eruption of Mount Pinatubo.
