= Manila Railroad 160 class =

Manila Railway/Railroad 160 class
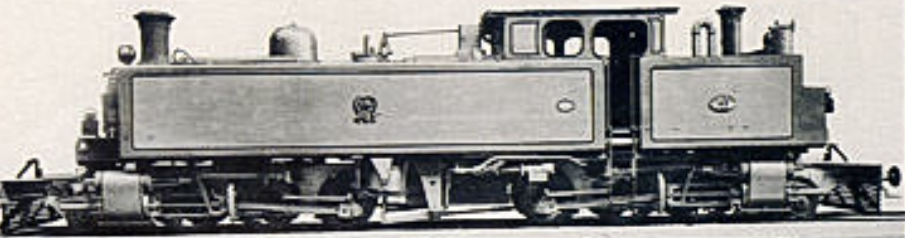
- Manila Railway 161, the first locomotive of the class.
Type and origin
- Power type: Steam
- Designer: Kitson and Company
- Builder: Kitson and Company
- Serial number: 4972-4975
- Build date: 1914
- Total produced: 4
Specifications
- Configuration
  - Whyte: 2-6-0+0-6-2T
  - UIC: 1C+C1t
- Gauge: 3 ft 6 in (1,067 mm)
- Wheelbase: 41 ft 7 in (12.67 m)
  - Engine: 14 ft 1 in (4.29 m)
  - Drivers: 9 ft (2.7 m)
- Adhesive weight: 71 LT 18 cwt (73,100 kg)
- Loco weight: 92 LT 8 cwt (93,900 kg)
- Fuel type: Oil
- Fuel capacity: 4 long tons (4.1 t; 4,100 kg)
- Water cap.: 3,000 imp gal (14,000 L)
- Boiler
  - Model
  - Type: Fire-tube boiler
- Boiler pressure: 160 psi (1,100 kPa)
- Superheater
  - Heating area: 352 sq ft (32.7 m^{2})
- Valve gear: Walschaerts
Performance figures
- Maximum speed: 10 mph (16 km/h)
- Tractive effort: 35,709 lbf (158.84 kN)
- Factor of adh.: 4.48
Career
- Operators: Manila Railway Company; Manila Railroad Company
- Number in class: 4
- Numbers: 161-164
- Locale: Manila (province); Present-day Calabarzon
- Delivered: 1914
- First run: 1914 (Antipolo line); 1917 (South Main Line)
- Last run: 1917 (Antipolo line); 1925 (South Main Line)
- Retired: 1925
- Preserved: 0
- Scrapped: 1925
- Disposition: All scrapped

The Manila Railroad 160 class^{[a]} of 1914 was a class of four 2-6-0+0-6-2 Double Mogul-type Kitson-Meyer locomotives. This particular class was the only type of articulated locomotive used by both the Manila Railway/Railroad Company, which were the predecessors to the Philippine National Railways. The class was introduced in 1914 and was originally intended for mixed traffic services on the Antipolo line. After that line's closure in 1917, the locomotives were transferred to the South Main Line to serve in Lucena, Quezon, and Pagsanjan, Laguna. All were withdrawn in 1925, shortly after the arrival of their replacements such as the Manila Railroad 200 class.

== Background ==
The Antipolo line was a suburban railway line that connected Tutuban to Antipolo, which was formerly located in the Province of Manila and is now the capital of Rizal, with an extension to Montalban. The line was notable for its steep gradient and required special rolling stock for its operations. To address this, the Manila Railway ordered tank locomotives from Kitson and Company in 1914, which was known at the time for providing Meyer locomotives for South American railroads pioneered by the Anglo-Chilean Nitrate and Railway Company. Each locomotive cost ₱71,000, which is equivalent to US$923,000 in 2020 dollars.

In the same year, the Manila Railway also placed an order with the North British Locomotive Company (NBL) for seven 4-6-4 Hudson-type side-tank locomotives. However, the delivery of these locomotives to the Philippines was hindered by World War I, which led to the cancellation of the order. NBL offered them for sale to the South African Railways (SAR) instead, as the SAR was experiencing a severe shortage of locomotives at that time. The locomotives were purchased and delivered to the SAR in 1917 and were designated as Class K. The Manila Railway intended to designate these locomotives as 160 class; that designation was then transferred to the Kitson locomotives, which were originally designated as 140 class while they were being built at the factory.

This was the last locomotive class ordered by the Manila Railway from the United Kingdom. The Manila Railway also introduced the Swiss/German-built 300 class rack tanks into service sometime within that year.

== Design ==
The 160 class was the only type of articulated locomotive that was ever used by the Manila Railway and its successor, the Manila Railroad. However, other railway operators in the Philippines also used similar types, mostly 0-6-6-0 tender Mallets. It is worth noting that this was also the first Kitson-Meyer class that entered service in Asia. The 2-6-2+2-6-2 Indian class TD was introduced in 1928 on the Kalka–Shimla railway, and later served the Kangra Valley Railway in Pakistan. Other Southeast and East Asian railroads preferred different types of articulated locomotives, which made the 160 class only four of its kind in the Far East.^{[b]}

The design of this class was based on the 2-6-0+0-6-2 Kitson-Meyer class of superheated locomotives that ran on the 3 ft gauge Ferrocarriles Nacionales de Colombia. However, the 160 class was wider, using the 3 ft 6 in (1,067 mm) Cape gauge. They also had 3 different tube sizes (each measuring 5.25", 1.875", 1.5" respectively), reflecting the Colombian locomotive the class was based on. Weighing a total of 92 long tons (93,000 kg), the 160 class was the heaviest class in terms of locomotive weight alone.^{[c]}

The most notable feature of this class was its boxed-shaped chassis, which was similar to that of a pannier tank locomotive. However, the fuel compartment was located at the rear end like traditional locomotives. None of the quartet was named, thus there were no nameplates on the locomotives. Instead, they had the Manila Railway monogram on the side tanks.

=== Planned expansion ===
According to Tuffnell (1986), R. D. Deacon, the locomotive superintendent, announced that the Manila Railway had plans to acquire four additional 2-6-2+2-6-2 Double Prairie-type Kitson-Meyer locomotives to their fleet if their operations in the Philippines proved successful. These locomotives were intended to operate on the Aringay-Baguio branch of the North Main Line leading to the Cordillera Mountains in northern Luzon, alongside the 300 class of 0-8-0T cog locomotives and Mirador, a named 0-6-0T that served the same purpose. However, the line was never completed, and the locomotives received negative feedback during their operation.

== Service ==
The four 160 class locomotives were introduced on the Antipolo line in 1914. However, throughout its operation, the class faced negative reception and controversy. According to the 1916 Supreme Court ruling, the locomotives had three strikes against them as they were inefficient, expensive to maintain, and ran very slowly. Their massive weight also contributed to higher fuel consumption than necessary for efficient runs. The design of the Antipolo line prevented trains from running at higher speeds, resulting in their low ridership; the locomotives themselves had an average speed of only 10 miles per hour (16 km/h). The delivery of parts from England during and after World War I caused maintenance costs to soar, and it was also this problem that made the Manila Railway cancel the order for the original 160 class locomotives.

The Antipolo line was closed in 1917 due to low passenger usage and an order of the Supreme Court, although it was later partially rebuilt to Guadalupe station in Mandaluyong during the Philippine National Railways era. Subsequently, the 160 class was transferred to the trunk of the South Main Line, which terminated in Lucena, Quezon. These locomotives were also served on a branch line that led to Pagsanjan, Laguna.

=== Retirement ===
The Manila Railroad purchased its rolling stock for the South Main Line and, by the late 1910s, started purchasing only tender locomotives from American manufacturers. The Porter-built 45-class locomotives were introduced on both North and South Main Line services by 1919. In 1922, the American Locomotive Company provided the 170 and 200 classes, which were at the time the largest passenger and freight locomotives in the MRR fleet. The new American classes were acclaimed by local railroad engineers for their speed and efficiency. Shortly after these newer locomotives entered into service in 1925, the 160 class was withdrawn and scrapped.

=== Legacy ===
A 160 class locomotive was featured in the cover of urban planner Arturo G. Corpuz's 1989 book, The Colonial Iron Horse: Railroads and Regional Development in the Philippines, 1875-1935.

== Note ==
1. ^{a} Even though the reorganization from the Manila Railway into the Manila Railroad was not finalized until 1916, the locomotives already bore the title "Manila Railroad" on their number plates.

2. ^{b} For example, the 1,000 mm gauge Royal State Railways of Siam and Burma Railway Company operated Garratts, while the 3 ft 6 in gauge Staatsspoorwegen of the Dutch East Indies (now Indonesian Kereta Api Indonesia) operated Mallets.

3. ^{c} The succeeding 170 and 200 classes of tender locomotives weighed less at approximately 81 long tons (82,000 kg) and 84 long tons (85,000 kg) respectively in terms of locomotive weight alone. These locomotives were only heavier in overall weight because of their accompanying tenders.
