= Manila Railroad 45 class =

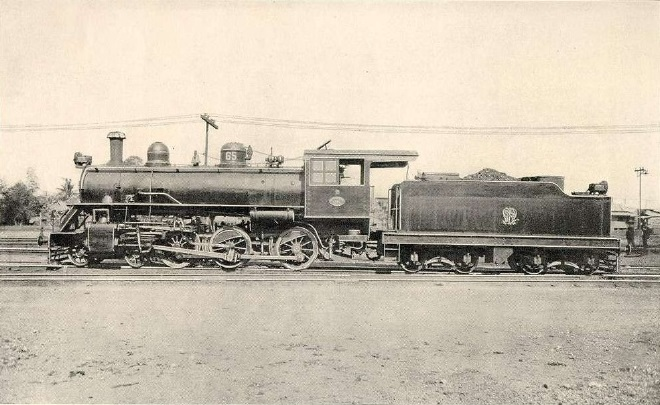
- Porter No. 65, a second generation 45-class, in Caloocan c. 1922.
Type and origin
- Power type: Steam
- Designer: H.K. Porter, Inc.
- Builder: H.K. Porter, Inc.
- Order number: 6385-94 (I); 6624-33 (II)
- Build date: 1919 (I); 1921 (II); 1932 (No. 65)
- Total produced: 20
Specifications
- Configuration
  - Whyte: 4-6-0
  - UIC: 2C
- Gauge: 3 ft 6 in (1,067 mm)
- Wheelbase
  - Engine: 23 ft (7.0 m)
  - Drivers: 11.5 ft (3.5 m)
- Length: 48 ft (15 m) with tender
- Adhesive weight: 74,000 lb (34,000 kg; 34 t)
- Loco weight: 92,000 lb (42,000 kg; 42 t) (I); 94,000 lb (43,000 kg; 43 t) (II)
- Tender weight: 68,000 lb (31,000 kg; 31 t)
- Total weight: 162,000 lb (73,000 kg; 73 t)
- Fuel type: Oil, coal
- Fuel capacity: 5.5 t (12,000 lb)
- Water cap.: 5,000 US gal (19,000 L)
- Boiler
  - Diameter: 48 in (1,200 mm)
- Boiler pressure: 180 psi (1,200 kPa)
- Heating surface
  - Firebox: 128 sq ft (11.9 m^{2})
  - Total surface
- Superheater
  - Heating area: 172 sq ft (16.0 m^{2})
- Cylinders: 3
- Cylinder size: 130.9 cu ft (3.71 m^{3})
- Valve gear: Walschaerts
Performance figures
- Maximum speed: 53 mph (85 km/h)
Career
- Operators: Manila Railroad Company; Philippine National Railways
- Class: 200
- Number in class: 21
- Numbers: 45-65
- Official name: 45 class
- Nicknames: Porters
- Locale: South Main Line, Luzon
- Delivered: 1919-21
- First run: 1921
- Withdrawn: 1956 (mainline) c. 1989 (ballast train)
- Preserved: 0
- Scrapped: c. 1960s-90s
- Disposition: All scrapped
- Notes: I: First batch (1919); II: Second batch (1921); References

The Manila Railroad 45 class of 1919 were twenty-one 4-6-0 Ten-wheeler steam locomotives. Twenty locomotives were built by American light duty locomotive manufacturer H.K. Porter, Inc. between 1919 and 1921 for the Manila Railroad Company (MRR). The so-called Porters were the most successful steam locomotive class in Philippine service. They carried express trains for passengers as well as short-range maintenance trains for 70 years and served both the MRR and its successor, the Philippine National Railways. However, like all tender engines from the Manila Railroad era, the last locomotive was scrapped in the 1990s without a single unit preserved.

== Background ==
The 45 class was intended as a continuation of the 37 class of 4-6-0 tender locomotives, both known to the British as the D-class, following the A/B/C subclasses of the Dagupan class of tank locomotives. Eight units of the D/37 class were built by Kerr, Stuart and Company in 1906 and were delivered to then-Manila Railway Company in 1907. The 37 class, along with the 4-4-2 100-class, were the main motive power for premiere expresses on the North Main Line, including the flagship Baguio Special from Manila to Damortis station in La Union with a connecting bus service to Baguio. The 37 class was also used on inaugural Bicol Express services on the South Main Line to Lucena, Quezon, by c. 1916.

By 1916, the government acquired the Manila Railway Company and merged it with a New Jersey–based firm of the same name and became the Manila Railroad Company. The production of future locomotives were transferred from mostly Scottish manufacturers to renowned American builders such as the American Locomotive Company and Baldwin Locomotive Works. Initially, light-duty railroad locomotive manufacturer H.K. Porter, Inc., simply known as Porter, acquired the rights to the production of another 4-6-0 locomotive class and would become the 45 class.

== Design ==
The most notable feature of the 45 class was that the roof of the locomotive extends to the tender. It provided cover against rainfall, a necessity for engineers shoveling coal from the tender to the engine. Some first batch engines were not designed this way however, and would instead borrow the tenders used by the earlier 37-class. Like all steam locomotives of the era, it had a buffer and chain type of railway coupling, the standard that would be adopted by the UIC later on. It also featured a Walschaerts valve gear which gained popularity among Asia-Pacific railroad operators.

The design was praised by the Manila Railroad for its efficient fuel usage, as well as its ease of maintenance. It will influence the design of later, larger steam locomotives. The Baldwin-built 140 class of 4-6-2 Pacifics used the design made by Porter.

== Service ==
The first group of locomotives, numbered 45-54 entered service in 1919 with the locomotives stored in Caloocan yards. Satisfied with its design, the Manila Railroad ordered 10 more locomotives and were built by Porter in 1921. The locomotives were used throughout the system during the 1920s and the 1930s. After World War II, several units survived unlike its bigger peers such as the 140 class and the 200 class. The remaining units continued pulling trains after the war until the 1950s.

=== Retirement ===
The switch to diesel power made the Manila Railroad to retire its steam locomotive fleet starting in 1954. The Porters were the first to be relegated from mainline service to short-distance maintenance trains carrying ballast, and served as such as late as 1980s. One of the locomotives; No. 62 would later be on static display as props for movies such as the 1989 Japanese war film Harimao. The last units were scrapped in the 1990s and were never preserved.
