= List of Philippine National Railways stations =

A map of the Philippine National Railways system. Active lines are in dark orange, inactive lines are in black, historically proposed lines are in gray, and the under-construction North-South Commuter Railway is in red.

The Philippine National Railways used to provide passenger services in two directions from the capital, thus serving various towns and cities north and south of Manila. This list contains stations of both the North Main Line and South Main Line, and the various spur lines from both lines, as well as stations within Metro Manila. Former termini or terminal stations are in bold and former or defunct stations are in italic.

== North Main Line ==
Stations along the Manila-San Fernando Line were abandoned and closed. San Fernando-Dagupan closed in 1983, Dagupan-Tarlac in 1988 and Tarlac-Malolos in 1989. The eruption of Mount Pinatubo further shortened services up to Meycauayan in 1991 until it was closed in 1997.

Section	Year Opened	Length	Distance from Manila
Manila-Bagbag	March 24, 1891	44 km	44 km
Bagbag-Mabalacat	February 2, 1892	43	87
Mabalacat-Tarlac	June 1, 1892	32	119
Tarlac-Dagupan	November 24, 1892	76	195
Dagupan-San Fabian	January 11, 1908	12	207
San Fabian-Rabon	July 5, 1908		
Rabon-Santo Tomas	November 14, 1908		
Santo Tomas-Agoo	December 4, 1908		
Agoo-South Aringay	July 26, 1909		
South Aringay-Aringay	1910		
Aringay-Bauang Sur	October 14, 1912	13	253
Bauang Sur-Bauang	January 16, 1929	2	255
Bauang-San Fernando U	May 16, 1929	12	265
San Fernando U-Sudipen	1943	25	290
San Fernando U-Bacnotan	January 25, 1955	18	283

=== Metro Manila ===
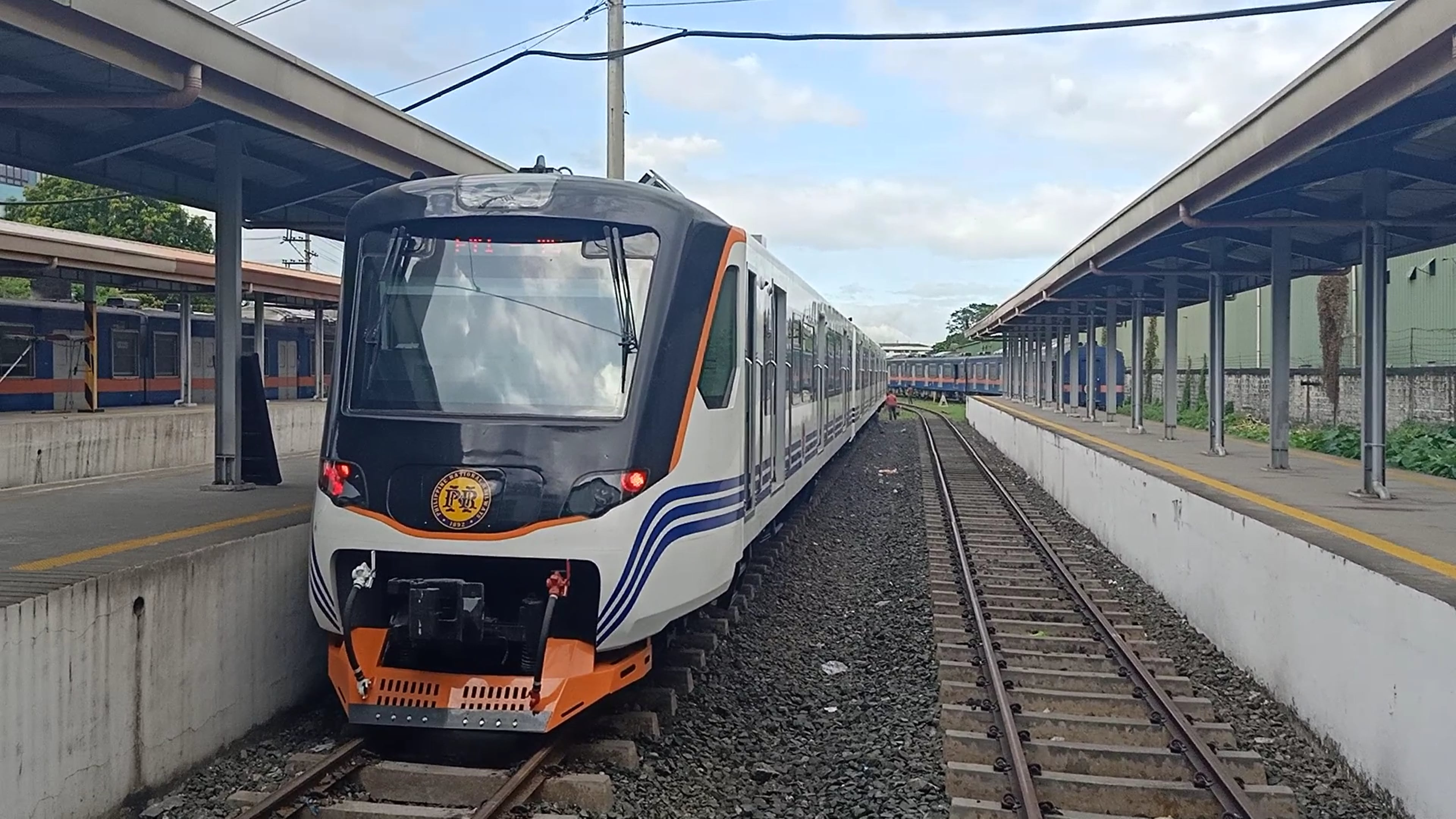
A PNR 8000 class in Tutuban station.

- **Tutuban** — Tondo, Manila. Head office of the PNR. Former station building converted to a mall in the 1990s.
- Solis — Tondo, Manila. Opened in 2018. To be rebuilt as part of the NSCR.
- 5th Avenue — C-3 Road, Caloocan. Opened in 2018. To be rebuilt as part of the NSCR.
- 10th Avenue — 10th Avenue, Caloocan. Opened in 2018. To be rebuilt as part of the NSCR.
- Caloocan — Samson Road, Caloocan. To be rebuilt as part of the NSCR.
  - Kalookan — Sangandaan, Caloocan.
- **Governor Pascual** — Malabon. Current northern terminus of the Metro North Commuter service.
- Valenzuela NSCR — Malanday, Valenzuela. The station is being built beside the NSCR Phase 1 depot.
  - Valenzuela — Dalandanan, Valenzuela. Formerly a flagstop named Polo, closed in 1997. Targeted to be the new northern terminus of the Metro North Commuter service.

=== Bulacan ===
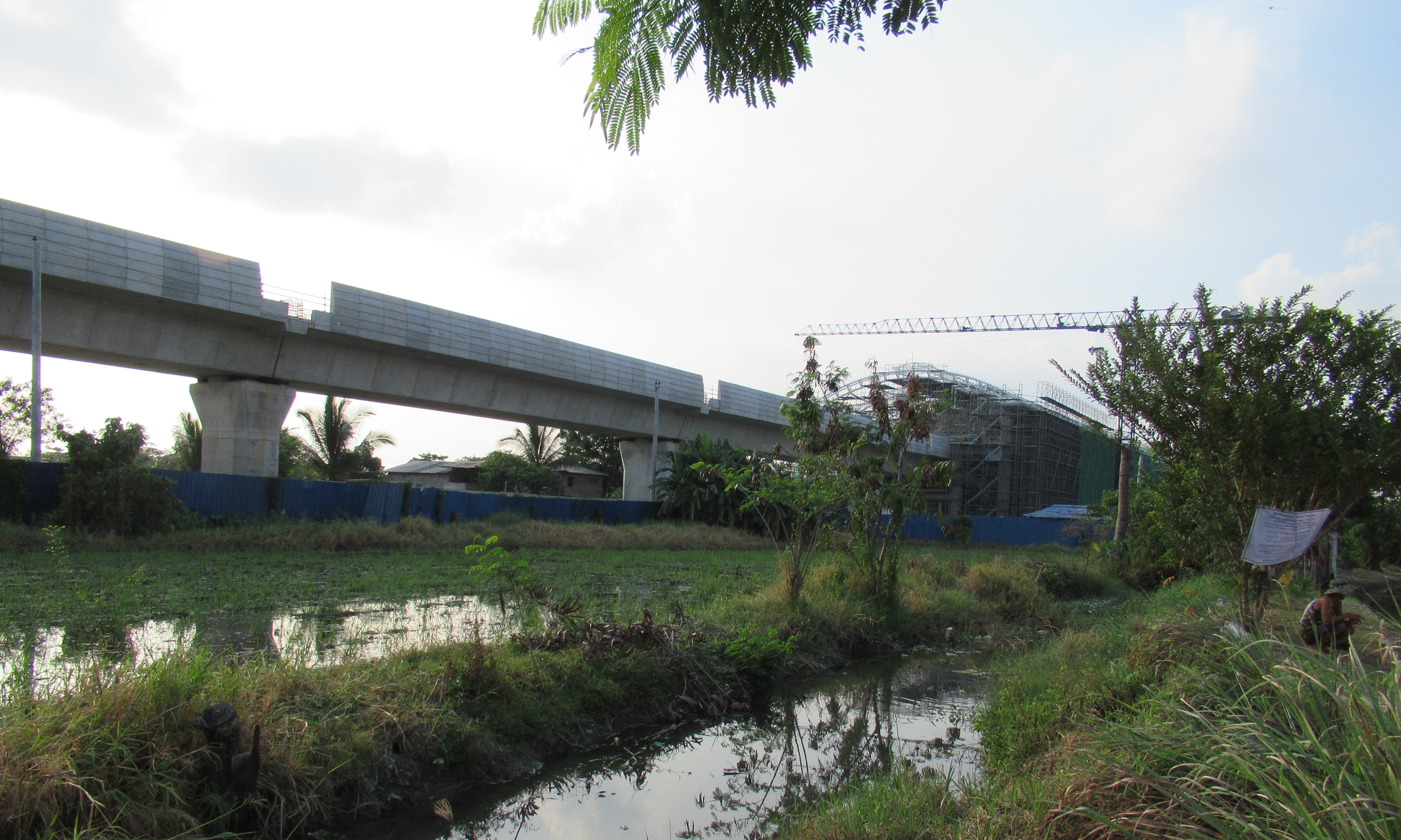
Construction of the NSCR near Balagtas station.

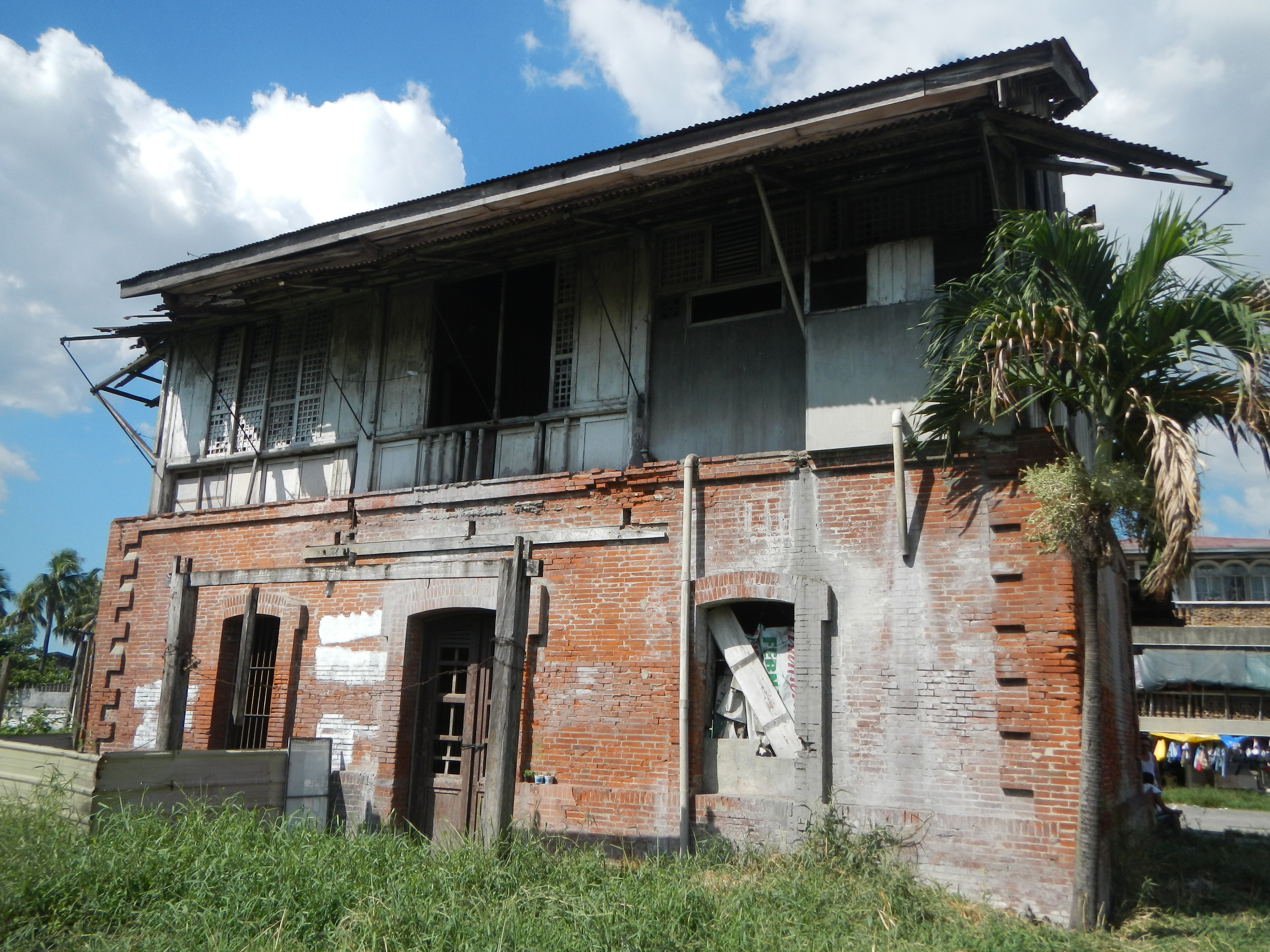
Meycauayan station.

The following stations were located in Bulacan with these closed between 1988 and 1991. A majority of these stations are being built under the North–South Commuter Railway (NSCR).

- Meycauayan — Meycauayan. Formerly Meycawayan. Being rebuilt under NSCR. No plans yet for a ground level station for Metro North Commuter.
- Imperial Textile Mills — Marilao. Meant to serve the Imperial Textile Mills plant, now Indo Phil. Closed in 1997.
- Marilao — Marilao. Being rebuilt under NSCR.
- Bocaue — Bocaue. Being rebuilt under NSCR.
- **Balagtas** — Balagtas. Being rebuilt under NSCR and proposed branching station for the Northeast Commuter Line to Cabanatuan.
  - **Bigaa** — Terminus of the Cabanatuan branch.
- Guiguinto — Guiguinto. Being rebuilt under NSCR.
- Tabang — Guiguinto. Closed in 1991.
- Santa Isabel — Malolos. Closed in 1991.
- Dakila — Malolos. Closed in 1991.
- Malolos — Malolos. Northern end of the NSCR Phase 1.
- San Marcos — Calumpit. Opened as an infill station before 1949, closed in 1988.
- Bagbag — Calumpit. Opened as part of the Bagbag–Mabalacat segment. Closed before 1949.
- Calumpit – Calumpit. Being rebuilt under NSCR.

=== Pampanga ===
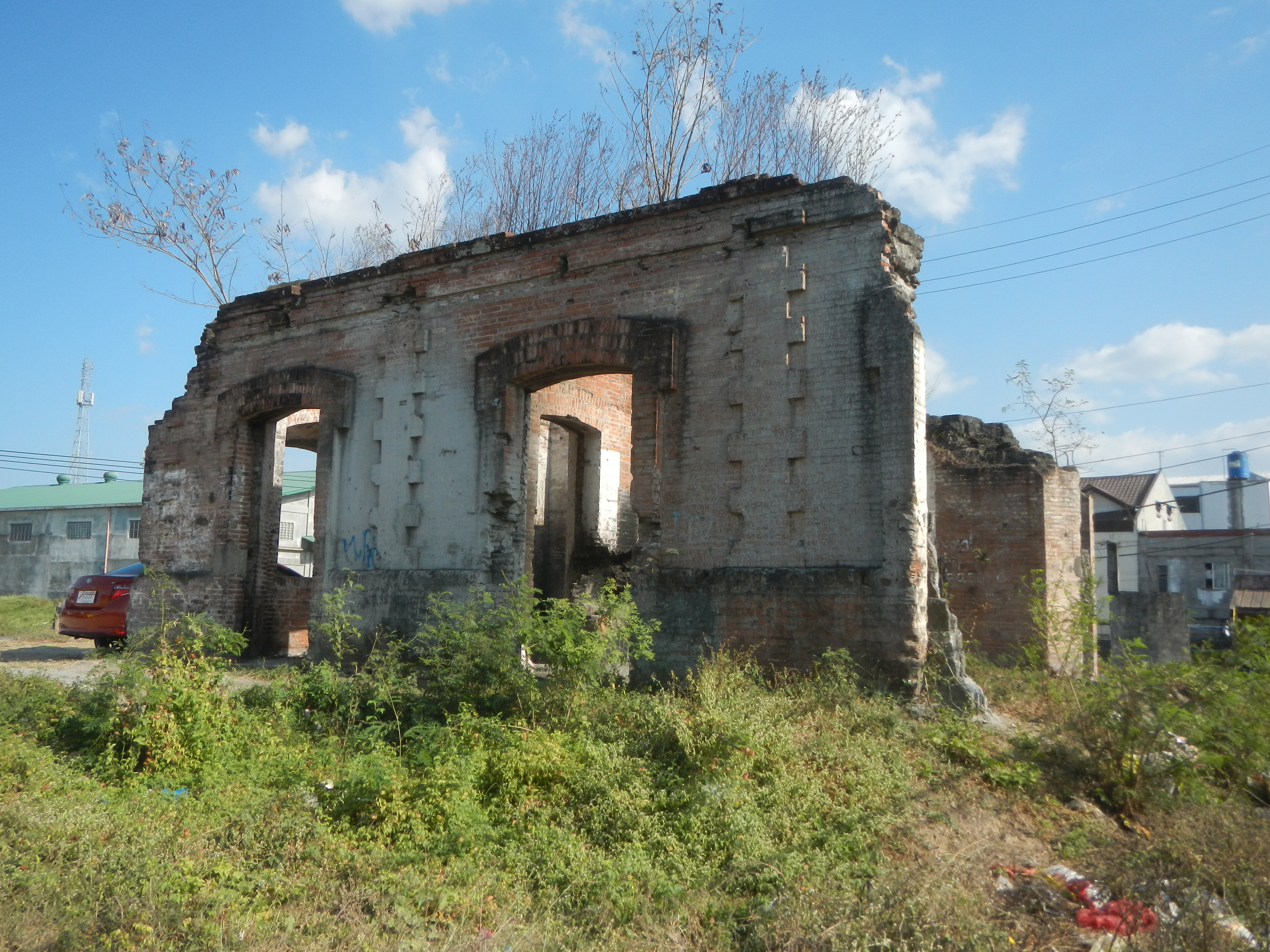
Old Guiguinto station.

The following stations of the North Main Line are located in Pampanga. Services here were closed in 1988 with some of the stations being built for the NSCR North's Phase 2.

- Calumpit Norte — Apalit. Temporary station during the 1890s. Mentioned in the 2020 book The Fireflies of Guiuan.
- Sulipan — Apalit.
- Apalit — Apalit. Passenger flag stop and freight station. Being rebuilt under NSCR.
- Macaluc — Minalin. Flagstop.
- Santo Tomas — Santo Tomas.
- **San Fernando** — San Fernando. Former terminus of the Metro Manila Commuter Service. Building preserved as a museum. New building being built under NSCR.
- Calalut — San Fernando.
- Tablante — San Fernando. Opened in 1924, closed before 1949.
- Angeles — Angeles City. Being rebuilt under NSCR.
- Balibago — Angeles.
- Clark — Clark Special Economic Zone, Angeles. Under construction.
- Clark International Airport — Clark SEZ, Mabalacat. Under construction. Located near the Mabalacat depot of NSCR Phase 2.
- Dau — Mabalacat.
- Mabalacat — Mabalacat.

=== Tarlac ===
The following are the stations located in Tarlac. Stations south of Tarlac City were closed in 1988 while stations to the north were closed in 1984. There are no stations here planned for reactivation, with New Clark City being the only new station to be built as part of the NSCR.

- Bamban — Bamban.
- **New Clark City** — Capas. Northern terminus of the NSCR and southern terminus of two North Long Haul proposals.
- Capas — Capas. Also known as Santo Domingo. Contains a Bataan Death March historical marker.
- Murcia — Concepcion. Also known as San Agustin.
- San Miguel — Tarlac City.
- Tarlac City — Tarlac City.
- Dalayap — Tarlac City.
- Amacalan — Gerona.
- Parsolingan — Gerona.
- Paniqui — Paniqui.
- San Julian — Moncada.
- Moncada — Moncada.

=== Pangasinan ===
- Alacan – Alacan, San Fabian
- Sapdaan – Sapdaan, San Fabian (Sapdaan)
- San Fabian – San Fabian (Terminus for the San Fabian-Camp One/San Fabian-Binday branch)
- Patalan – Patalan, San Fabian
- Mangaldan – Mangaldan
- Maasin P. – Maasin, Mangaldan
- **Dagupan** – Mayombo, Dagupan
- Calasiao – Calasiao (ruins)
- Buenlag – Buenlag, Calasiao
- San Carlos – San Carlos, Pangasinan
- Malasiqui – Malasiqui
- Polong – Polong, Malasiqui (flag stop, opened in 1939)
- Don Pedro – Don Pedro, Malasiqui
- Quesada – Nalsian Norte, Malasiqui (now a basketball court)
- Bayambang (Bayambang Pasajeros) – Bayambang
- Bautista (Bayambang Mercancias) – Bautista (Originally as Bayambang Freight between 1892 and 1900).
- Poponto – Poponto, Bautista

=== La Union ===
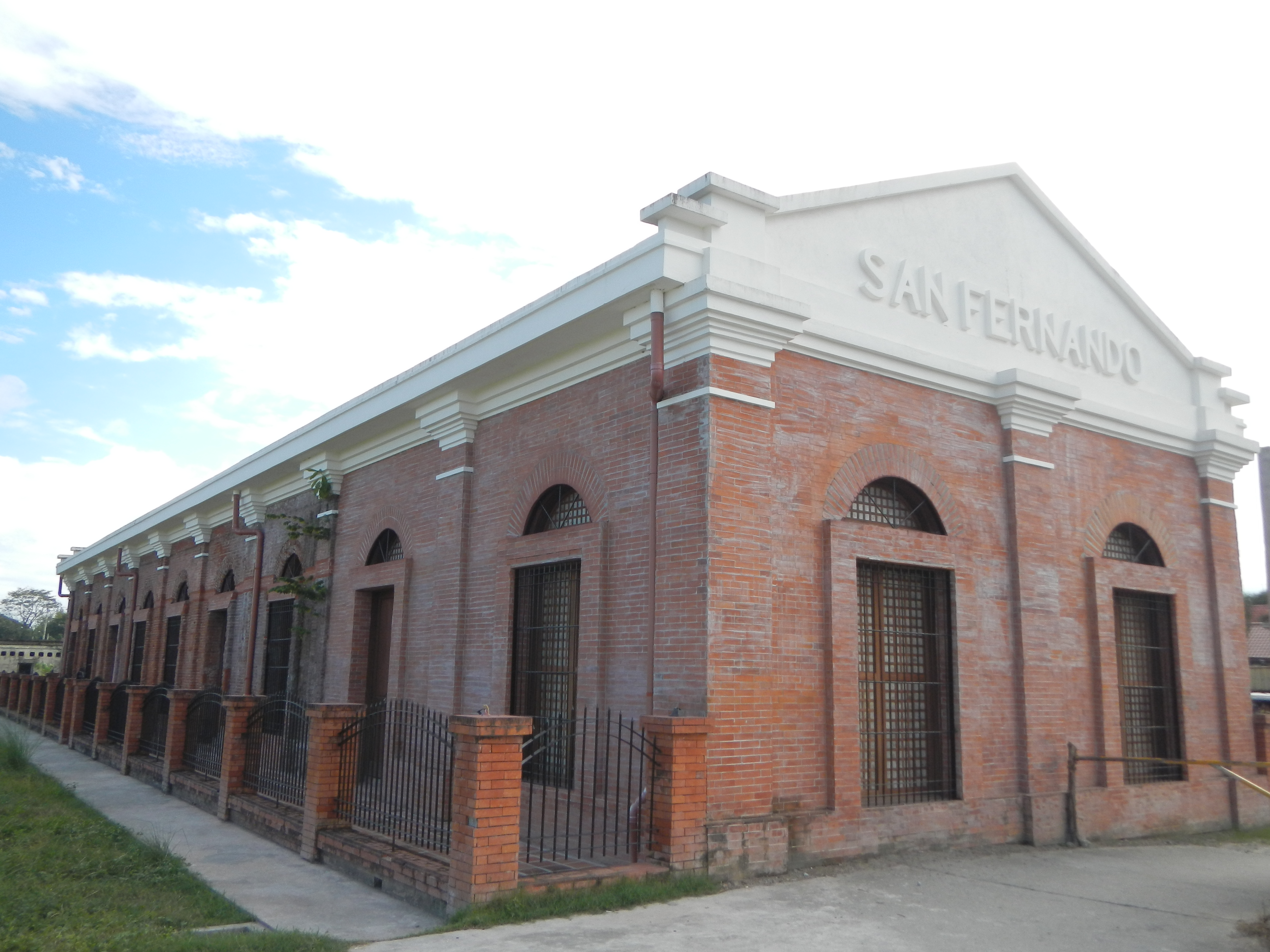
Façade of the San Fernando station in San Fernando, Pampanga.

- **Sudipen** – Sudipen (The line was extended here during the Japanese Occupation)
- Quirino – Quirino, Bacnotan
- Maragayap – Maragayap, Bacnotan
- Santa Cruz – Santa Cruz, Bacnotan
- Bulala – Bulala, Bacnotan
- **Bacnotan** – Bacnotan (Terminus since 1955)
- Baroro – Baroro, Bacnotan
- Taboc – Brgy., San Juan
- San Juan – San Juan, La Union
- Bato – Bato, San Juan
- Mameltac – Saoay, San Fernando
- Biday – Biday, San Fernando
- **San Fernando** (San Fernando U) – San Fernando, La Union
- Romas – Paringao, Bauang (opened in 1931)
- Bauang – Bauang
- **Calumbaya** (Bauang Sur) – Calumbaya, Bauang
- Santiago – Santiago, Bauang
- Urayong – Urayong, Bauang
- Caba (Cava) – Caba
- **Aringay** – Aringay [Terminus for the Aringay-Baguio Line]
- South Aringay – Aringay (Temporary station during the construction of the Aringay Bridge)
- Paraton – San Eugenio, Aringay
- Agoo – Agoo
- Santo Tomas (Santo Tomas U) – Santo Tomas
- Cupang – Cupang, Santo Tomas
- Old Damortis – Damortis, Rosario (Original Damortis Sta.)
- **Damortis** – Damortis, Rosario [terminus for car/bus shuttle service to Baguio via Kennon Road]
- Bani – Bani, Rosario (opened in 1926)
- Rabon – Rabon, Rosario

== East West Line (rapid transit) ==
The PNR East West line, or MRT Line 8, is a proposed rapid transit line in Metro Manila in the Philippines, generally running in an east–west direction along the Radial Road 7 and a portion of the Radial Road 8.

The line serves 11 stations on 9.4 kilometers (5.8 mi) of line. The rails are mostly elevated and erected either over or along the roads covered, with sections below ground. The western terminus of the line is the Hidalgo station infont of Quiapo Church along Quezon Boulevard, while the eastern terminus of the line is the UP Diliman station along Commonwealth Avenue in barangay U.P. Campus, Quezon City.

=== Metro Manila ===
- UP Diliman – Quezon City
- Quezon Memorial Circle – Quezon City
- Triangle Park – Quezon City
- Timog – Quezon City
- FPJ Avenue – Quezon City
- Araneta – Quezon City
- Banawe – Quezon City
- Welcome – Quezon City
- Maceda – Manila
- Lacson – Manila
- Lerma – Manila
- Hidalgo – Manila

== South Main Line (Southrail) ==
Section	Date Opened	Distance	Distance from Manila
Santa Mesa-Paco	March 25, 1908	3	9
Paco-Muntinlupa	June 21, 1908	22	32
Muntinlupa-Calamba	January 24, 1909	24	56
Calamba – Los Baños	August 15, 1910	8	64
College- San Pablo	August 20, 1923	23	88
Calamba-Malvar	January 4, 1910	19	75
Malvar-San Pablo	July 3, 1911	19	94
San Pablo-Tiaong	July 1912	9	98
Tiaong-Lucena	February 10, 1913	34	133
Lucena-Padre Burgos	1914	32	165
Padre Burgos – Hondagua – Calauag	May 10, 1916	77	243
Calauag – Aloneros	August 16, 1921	12	255
Aloneros – Manato	January 13, 1931	45	300
Port Junction-Ragay-Lupi Viejo	August 28, 1933		
Lupi Viejo-Sipocot	September 13, 1931		
Sipocot-Libmanan	July 1930		
Libmanan-Pamplona	February 3, 1929		
Pamplona-Naga	October 18, 1921	12	
Naga-Pili	April 1, 1920	28	405
Baao-Iriga	August 1915		
Iriga Legazpi- Tabaco	November 1914	62	474

=== Metro Manila ===
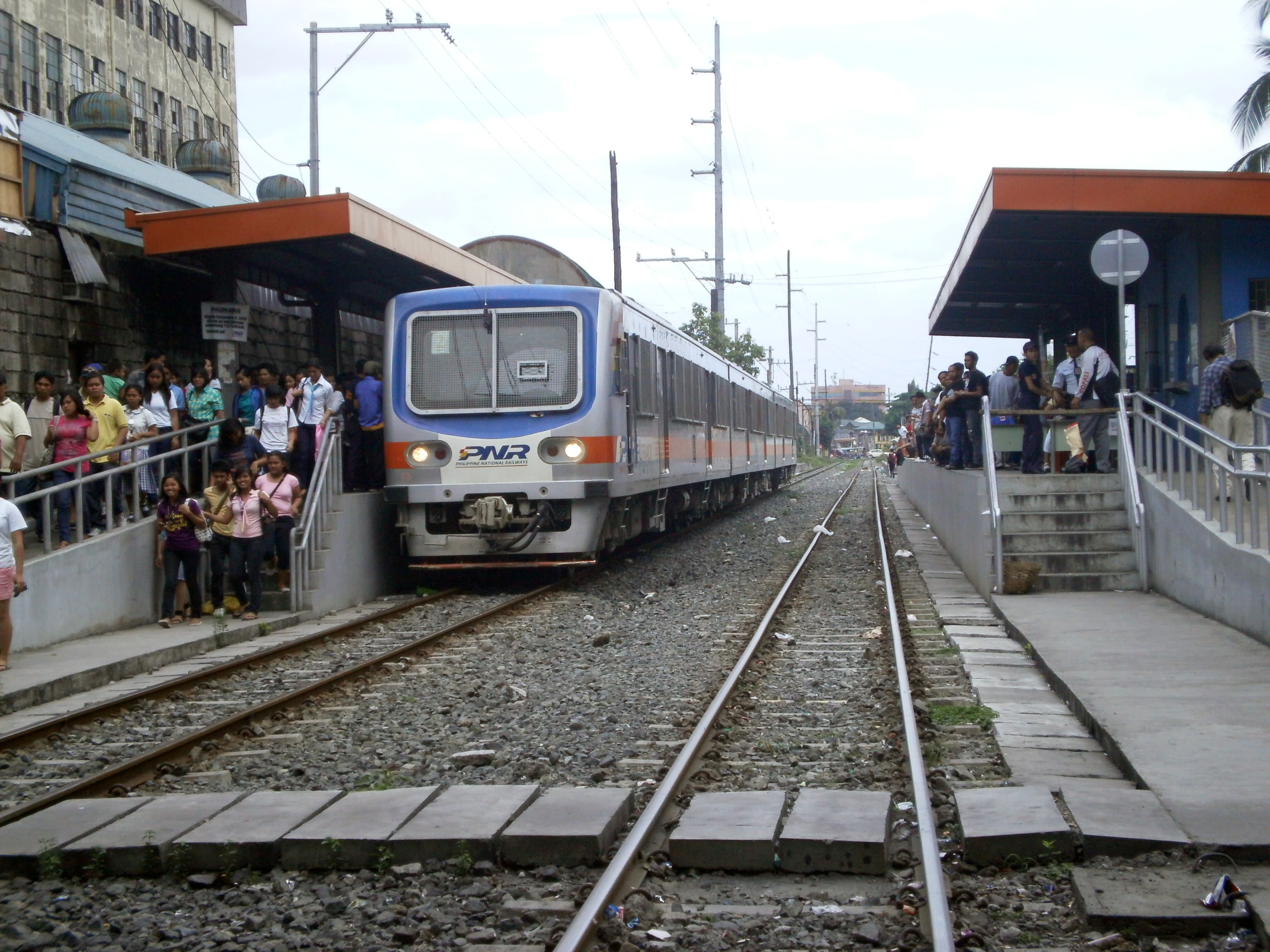
Blumentritt railway station in Manila.

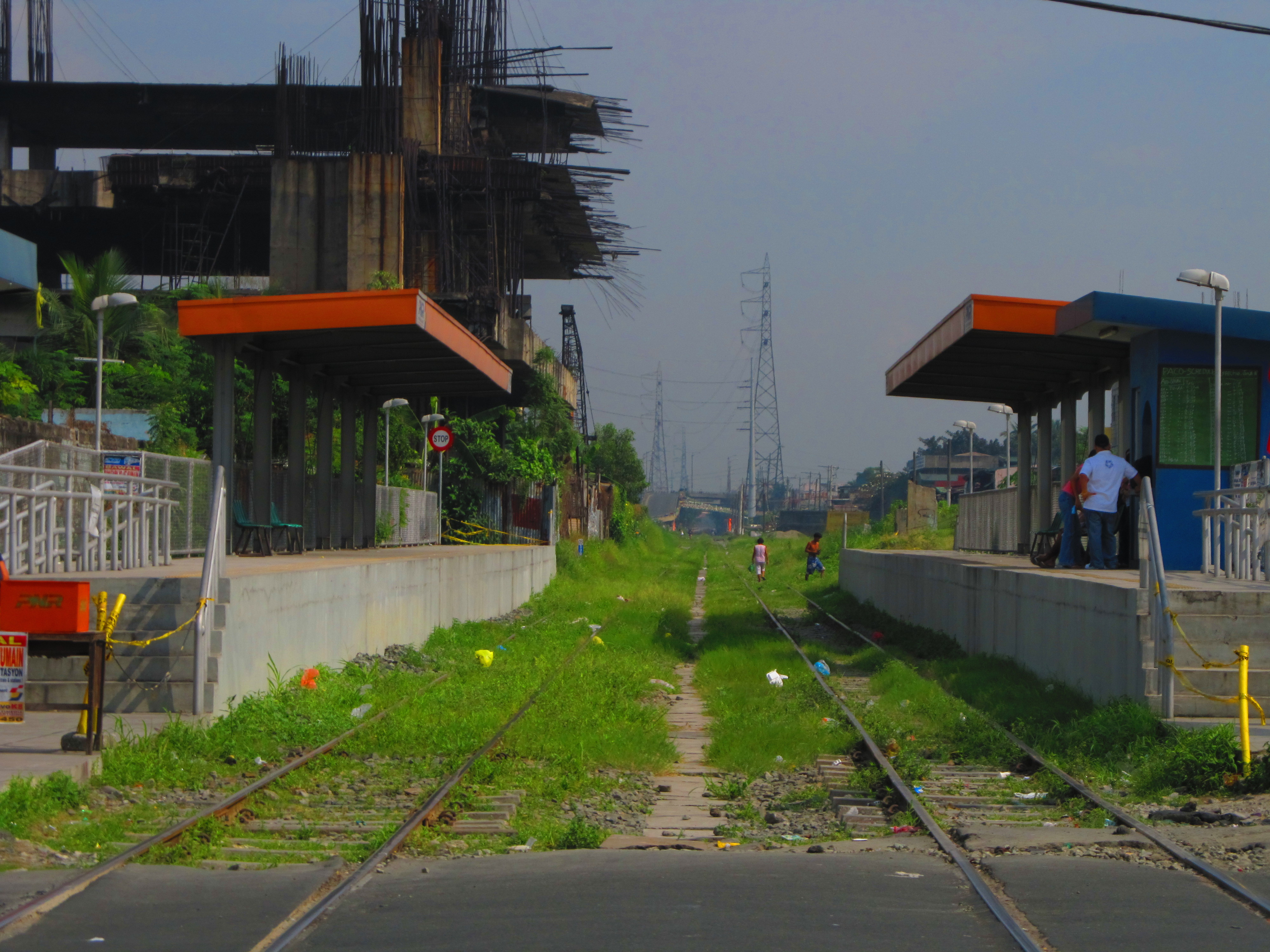
Paco station

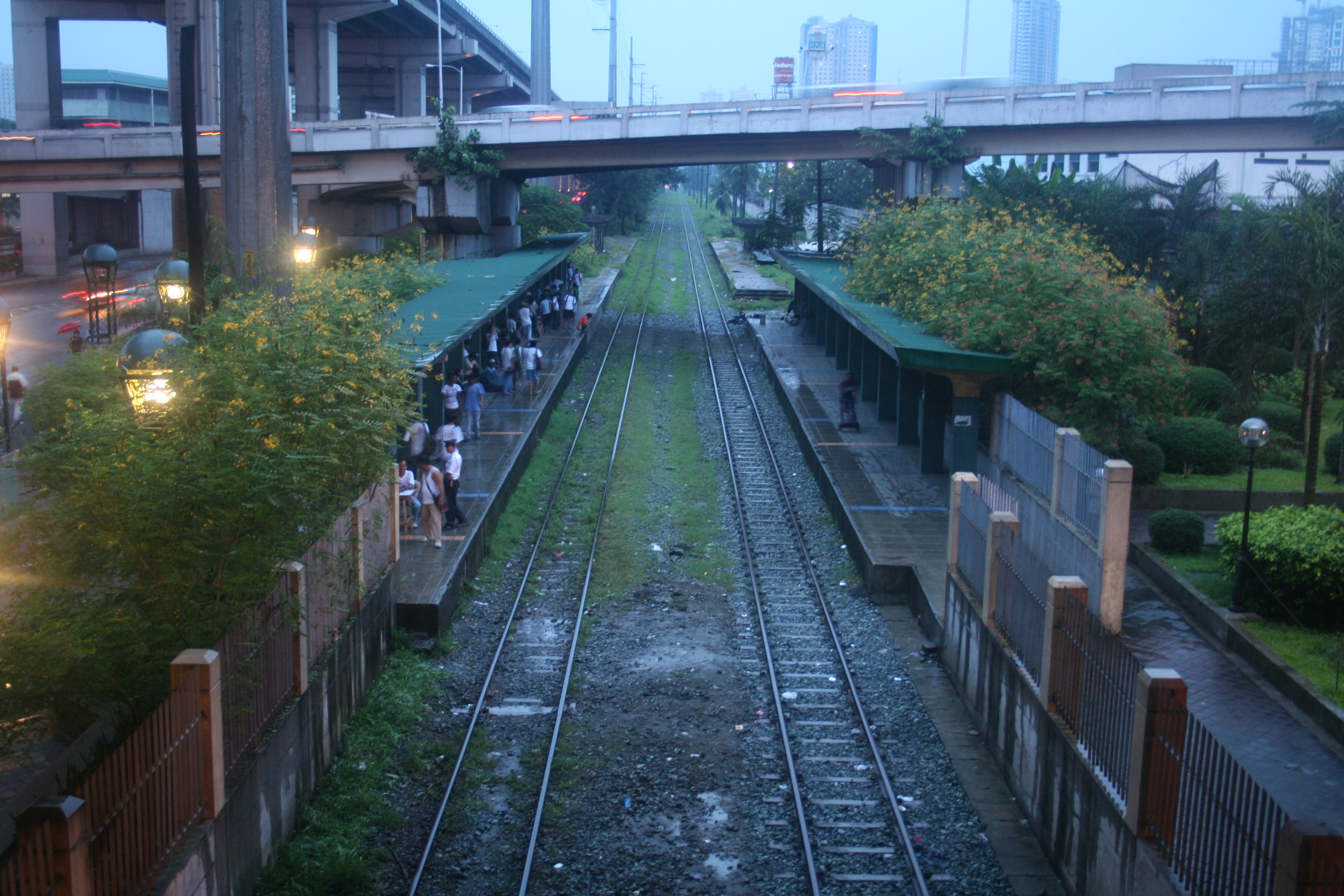
EDSA station in Makati.

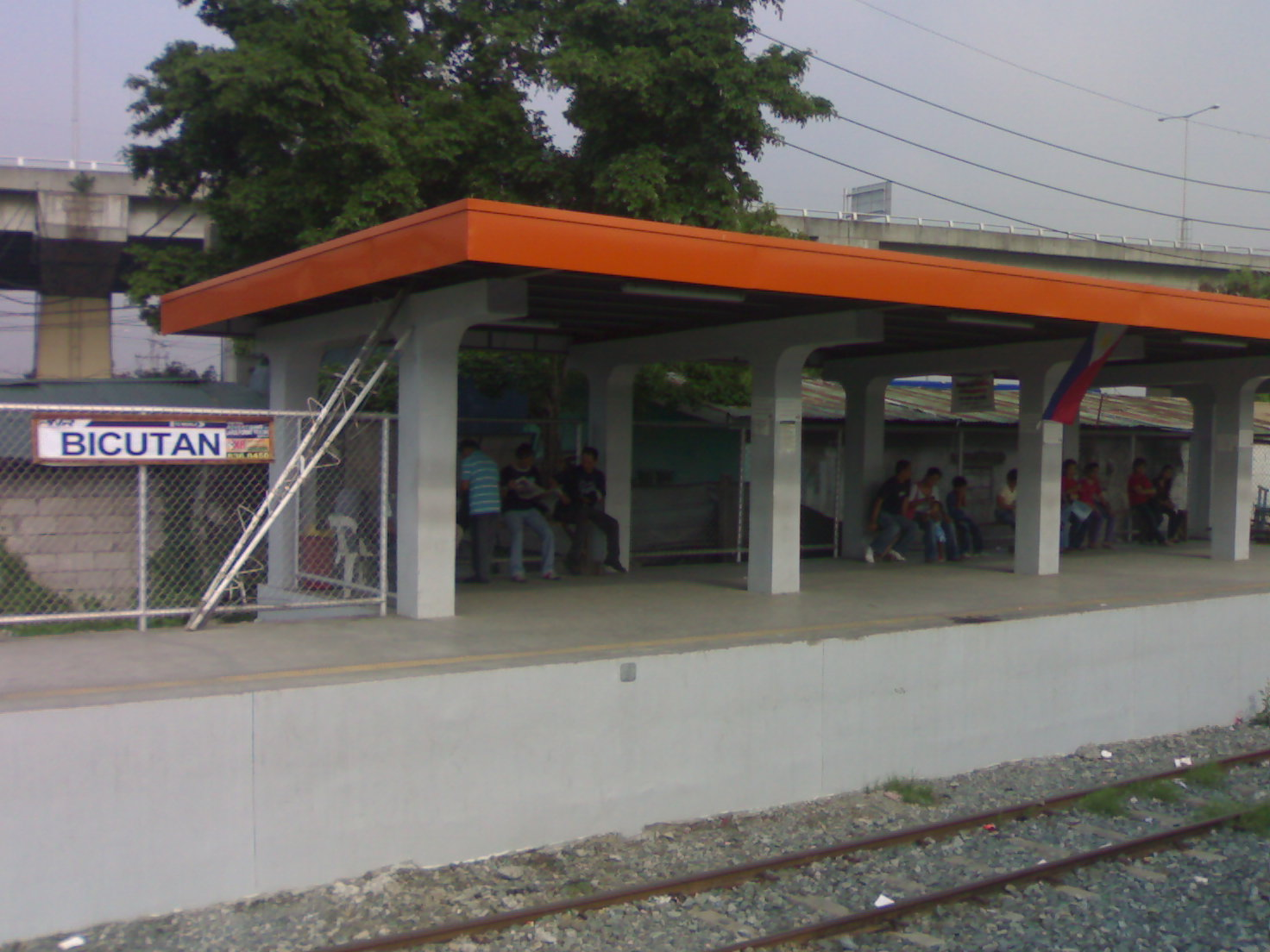
Bicutan station in Parañaque.

- **Tutuban** (Manila/Tondo) – Tondo, Manila (north terminus of the PNR Metro Commuter Line)
- Tayuman – Tayuman Street, Tondo, Manila (defunct, former terminus when Tutuban was converted into a mall)
- Blumentritt (San Lazaro/Santa Cruz) – Sampaloc, Manila
- Laong-Laan (Dapitan) – Sampaloc, Manila
- España – Sampaloc, Manila
- Legarda – Sampaloc, Manila (defunct flag stop)
- Sampaloc – Sampaloc, Manila (defunct)
- Santa Mesa – Santa Mesa, Manila (beside Polytechnic University of the Philippines)
- Pandacan (Beata) – Pandacan, Manila
- Paco – Paco, Manila
- San Andres – San Andres, Manila
- Vito Cruz – San Andres, Manila
- Buendia – Pio del Pilar, Makati (closed, replaced by Dela Rosa station)
- Dela Rosa – Pio del Pilar, Makati
- Pasay Road (Culi-culi/Pio del Pilar) – Pio del Pilar, Makati
- EDSA – Bangkal, Makati
- Nichols (Bonifacio-Villamor) – Western Bicutan, Taguig
- Balagbag – Balagbag, Pasay (defunct, replaced by FTI)
- FTI – (Food Terminal Junction/Arca South) Western Bicutan, Taguig
- Philippine-American Embroidery (Gelmart) – San Martin de Porres, Parañaque (defunct, replaced by Bicutan)
- Bicutan – San Martin de Porres, Parañaque
- Bagumbayan – Bagumbayan, Taguig (defunct flag stop)
- Batisan – Bagumbayan, Taguig (defunct flag stop)
- Sucat – Sucat, Muntinlupa (northern terminus of PNR South Long Haul)
- Buli (Cupang) – Cupang, Muntinlupa (defunct)
- **Alabang** – Alabang, Muntinlupa
- Muntinlupa – Poblacion, Muntinlupa
- Tunasan – Tunasan, Muntinlupa [flag stop] (defunct)

=== Laguna ===
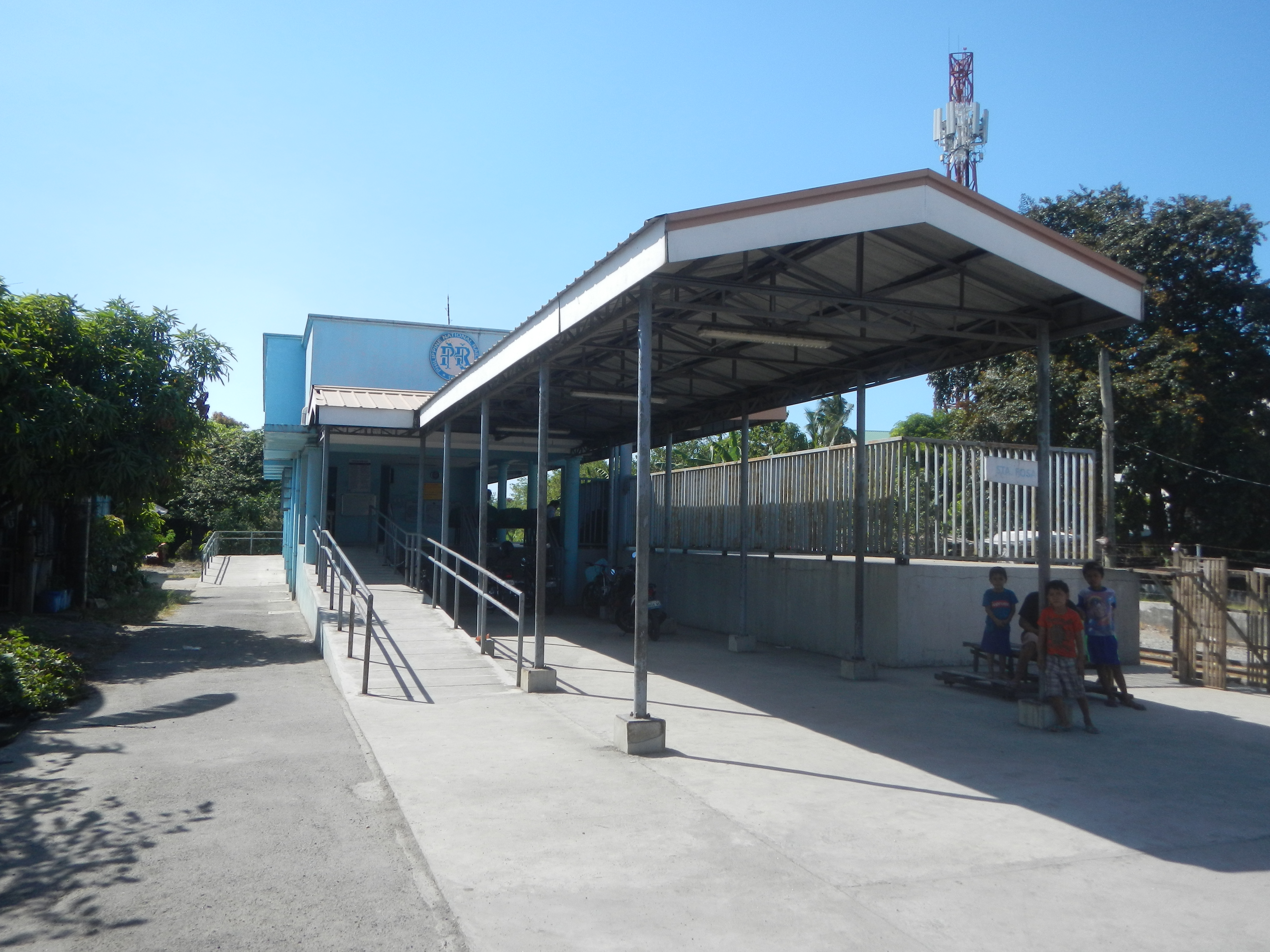
Santa Rosa station in Laguna

- **San Pedro** (San Pedro Tunasan) – San Vicente, San Pedro (Terminus for the defunct San Pedro-Carmona branch line)
- Pacita Complex – Pacita Complex, San Pedro
- Golden City 1 – Golden City Subdivision, Biñan
- Biñan – Biñan
- **Santa Rosa** – Labas, City Proper, Santa Rosa
- Golden City 2 station – Golden City Subdivision, Santa Rosa
- Cabuyao – near Asia Brewery, Inc. Manufacturing Plant, Cabuyao
- **Mamatid** – Mamatid, Cabuyao (Terminus for the Mamatid-Canlubang Line)
- Banlic – Banlic, Calamba
- **Calamba** – 1, Calamba (Terminus for the Calamba-Batangas branch line). Southern terminus of the Metro North Commuter service. Southern terminus of NSCR.
- **Halang Dos** - Halang, Calamba (Northern terminus of the Inter-Provincial Commuter service)
- Bucal – Bucal, Calamba (removed in 1916)
- Pansol – Pansol, Calamba
- Masili railway station – Masili, Calamba (flag stop)
- Los Baños – Bambang, Los Baños
- **UP Los Baños** (Junction/College) – University of the Philippines, Batong Malake, Los Baños (Terminus for the UP Los Baños-Santa Cruz branch line)
- **IRRI** – International Rice Research Institute, University of the Philippines, Batong Malake, Los Baños Current southern terminus of the Metro South Commuter service.
- Masaya – Masaya, Bay
- San Crispin – San Crispin, San Pablo (ruins)
- **San Pablo** – San Pablo
- McCord – San Miguel, San Pablo (defunct)
- Santa Ana – Santa Ana, San Pablo (defunct)

=== Quezon ===
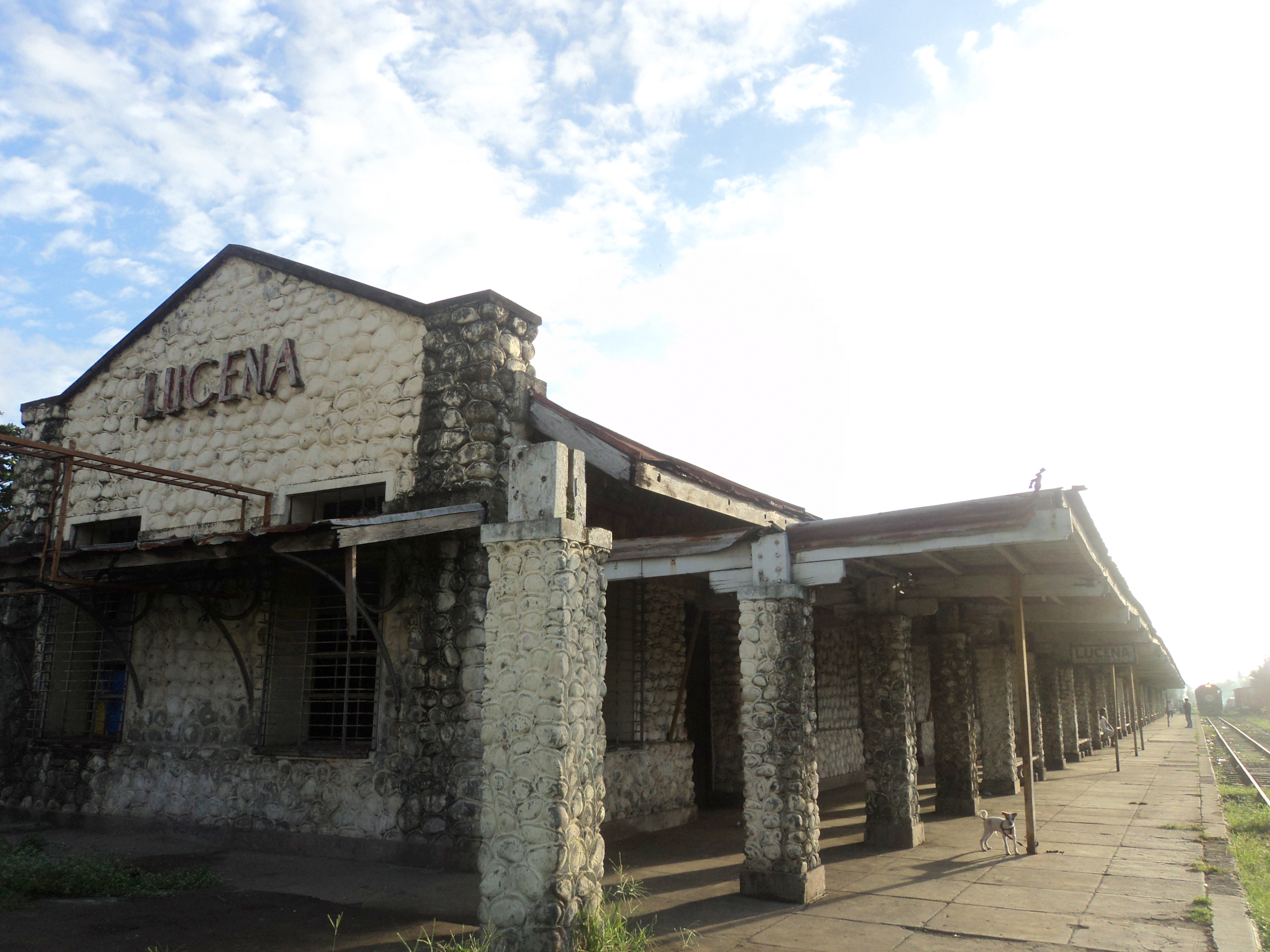
Lucena station

- Tiaong (Lalig) – Tiaong
- Lusacan – Lusacan, Tiaong
- Candelaria – Candelaria
- Concepcion – Concepcion, Sariaya (flag stop)
- Lutucan – Barangay Lutucan, Sariaya
- Sariaya (Bucal) – Bucal, Sariaya
- Morong – Morong, Sariaya
- **Lucena** – South City Proper, Lucena
- Mayao – Mayao, Lucena (defunct flag stop)
- Castillo – Castillo, Pagbilao
- Pagbilao – Pagbilao
- Pinagbayanan – Pinagbayanan, Pagbilao
- Palsabangon – Ibabang Palsabangon, Pagbilao( flagstop)
- Binahaan – Binahaan, Pagbilao
- Malicboy – Malicboy, Pagbilao
- Guintong – Guinto, Pagbilao
- Sipa – Sipa, Pagbilao
- Hinguiwin – Hinguiwin, Padre Burgos
- Padre Burgos (Laguimanoc) – Padre Burgos
- Marao – Marao, Padre Burgos
- Pinaninding – Danlagan, Padre Burgos
- San Isidro (Yawe) – San Isidro, Padre Burgos
- Walay – Walay, Padre Burgos
- Cabuyao – Cabuyao Sur, Padre Burgos (flag stop)
- Agdangan – Agdangan
- Panaon – Panaon, Unisan
- Poctol – Poctol, Unisan
- Atimonan (Summit) – Inalig, Atimonan
- Plaridel (Siain) – Plaridel
- Inaclagan – Inaclagan, Gumaca
- Villa Bota – Villa Bota, Gumaca
- Gumaca – Gumaca
- Panikihan – Panikihan, Gumaca
- Bamban – Bamban, Gumaca
- Hagakhakin – Hagakhakin, Gumaca
- San Vicente – San Vicente, Gumaca
- Pansol – Pansol, Lopez, (defunct flag stop, opened in 1923)
- Lopez – Lopez
- Santa Lucia – Santa Lucia, Lopez
- Hondagua – Hondagua, Lopez
- Calauag – Santa Maria, Calauag
- Sumulong – Sumulong, Calauag
- Santo Domingo – Santo Domingo, Calauag
- Danlagan – Danlagan Reserva, Guinayangan (destroyed in 1945)
- **Aloneros** – Aloneros, Guinayangan
- Cabugwang – Cabugwang, Tagkawayan
- Manato – Manato station, Tagkawayan
- New Aloneros – Manato station, Tagkawayan
- Mangayao – Mangayao, Tagkawayan
- Katimo – Katimo, Tagkawayan
- Buyabod – Buyabod, Tagkawayan
- Kinatakutan – Kinatakutan, Tagkawayan
- Laurel – Laurel, Tagkawayan
- Aliji – Aliji, Tagkawayan
- Morato – Morato, Tagkawayan
- Tagkawayan – Tagkawayan

=== Camarines Sur ===
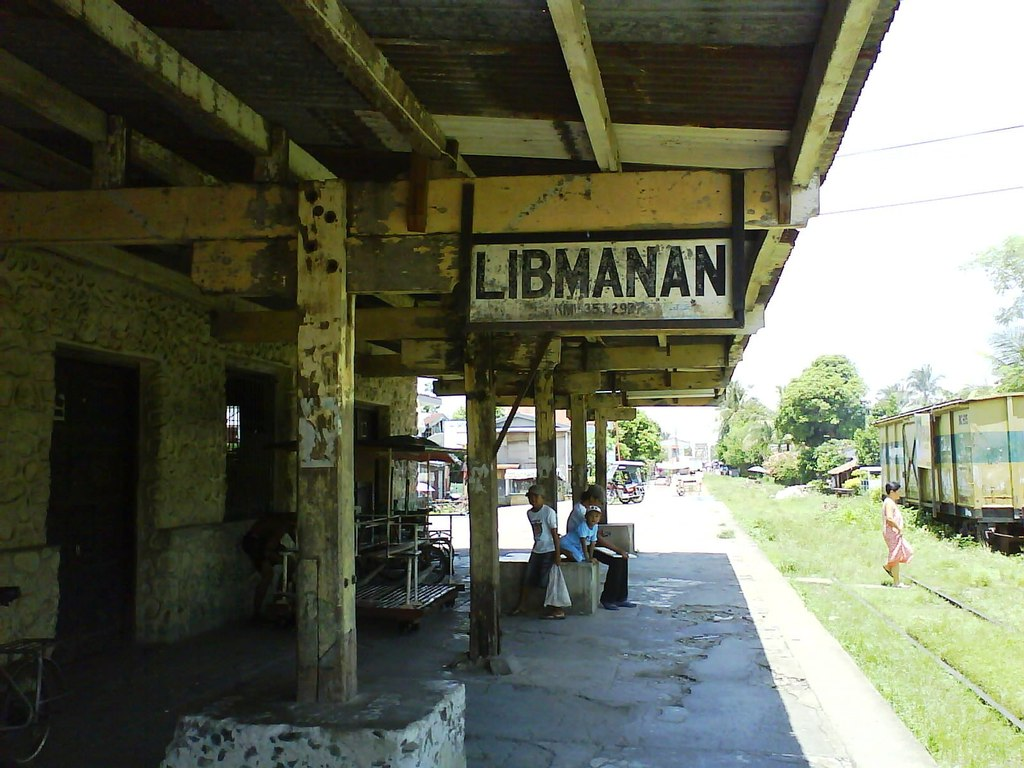
Libmanan station.

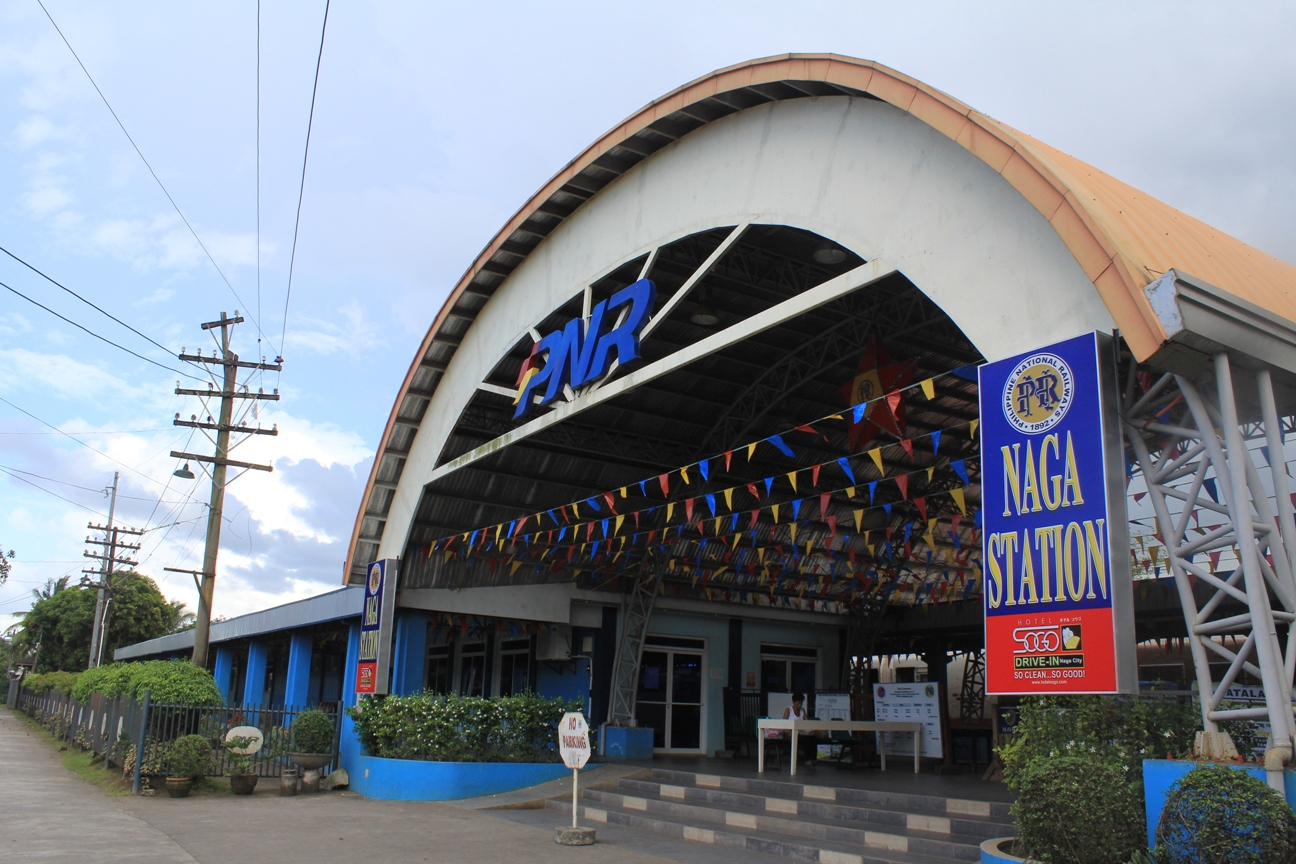
Naga station

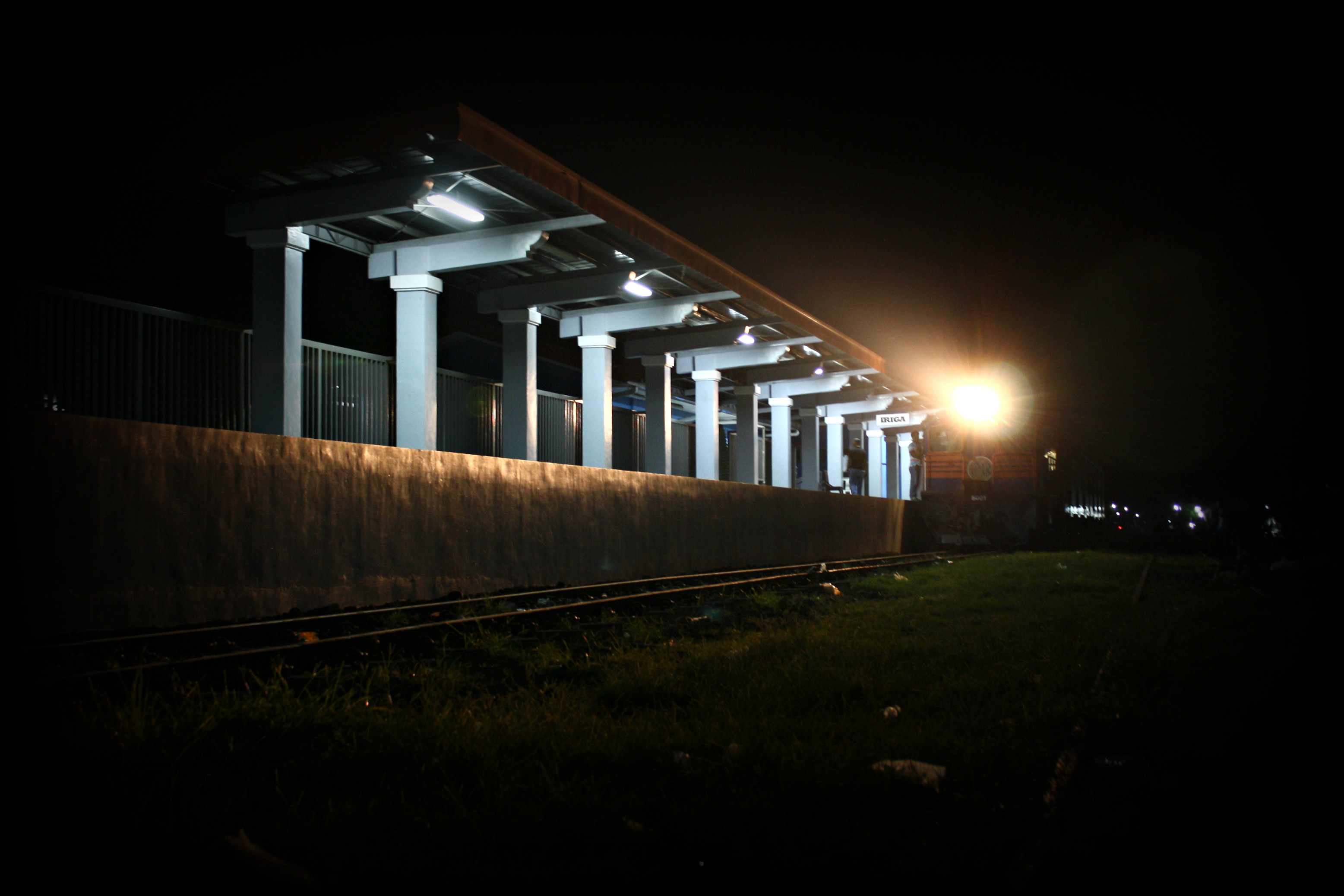
Iriga station at night.

- Pasay (Pasay C.S.) – Pasay, Del Gallego
- Del Gallego – Del Gallego
- San Juan – San Juan, Del Gallego
- Sinuknipan – Sinuknipan, Del Gallego
- Catabangan (Godofredo Reyes Sr.) – Godofredo Reyes Sr. (Catabangan Junction), Ragay
- Port Junction – Port Junction, Ragay
- Fort Simeon (Pugod) – Fort Simeon, Ragay
- Liboro – Liboro, Ragay
- Ragay – Ragay
- Banga Caves – Banga Caves, Ragay
- Del Rosario – Colacling (Del Rosario), Lupi (flag stop)
- Lupi Viejo – Lupi (flag stop)
- Lupi Nuevo – Tapi, Lupi
- Manangle – Manangle, Sipocot
- Sipocot – Sipocot
- Awayan – Awayan, Sipocot (flag stop)
- Mantalisay – Mantalisay, Libmanan (flag stop)
- Camambugan – Camambugan, Libmanan (flag stop)
- Libmanan – Libmanan
- Rongos – Rongos, Libmanan [flag stop]
- Malansad – Malansad, Libmanan [flag stop]
- Mambulo – Mambulo Viejo, Libmanan (flag stop)
- Pamplona – Pamplona
- Burabod – Burabod, Pamplona (flag stop)
- Sampaloc – Sampaloc, Gainza (flag stop)
- **Naga** – Triangulo, Naga, Camarines Sur
- San Antonio (San Antonio C.S.) – San Antonio, Milaor
- Maycatmon – Maycatmon, Milaor
- San Jose – San Jose, Pili
- Pili – Pili
- Bula – Bula
- Agdangan – Agdangan, Baao
- Baao – Baao
- Iriga – Iriga
- Lourdes Old – Lourdes Old, Nabua (flag stop)
- Bato – Bato

=== Albay ===
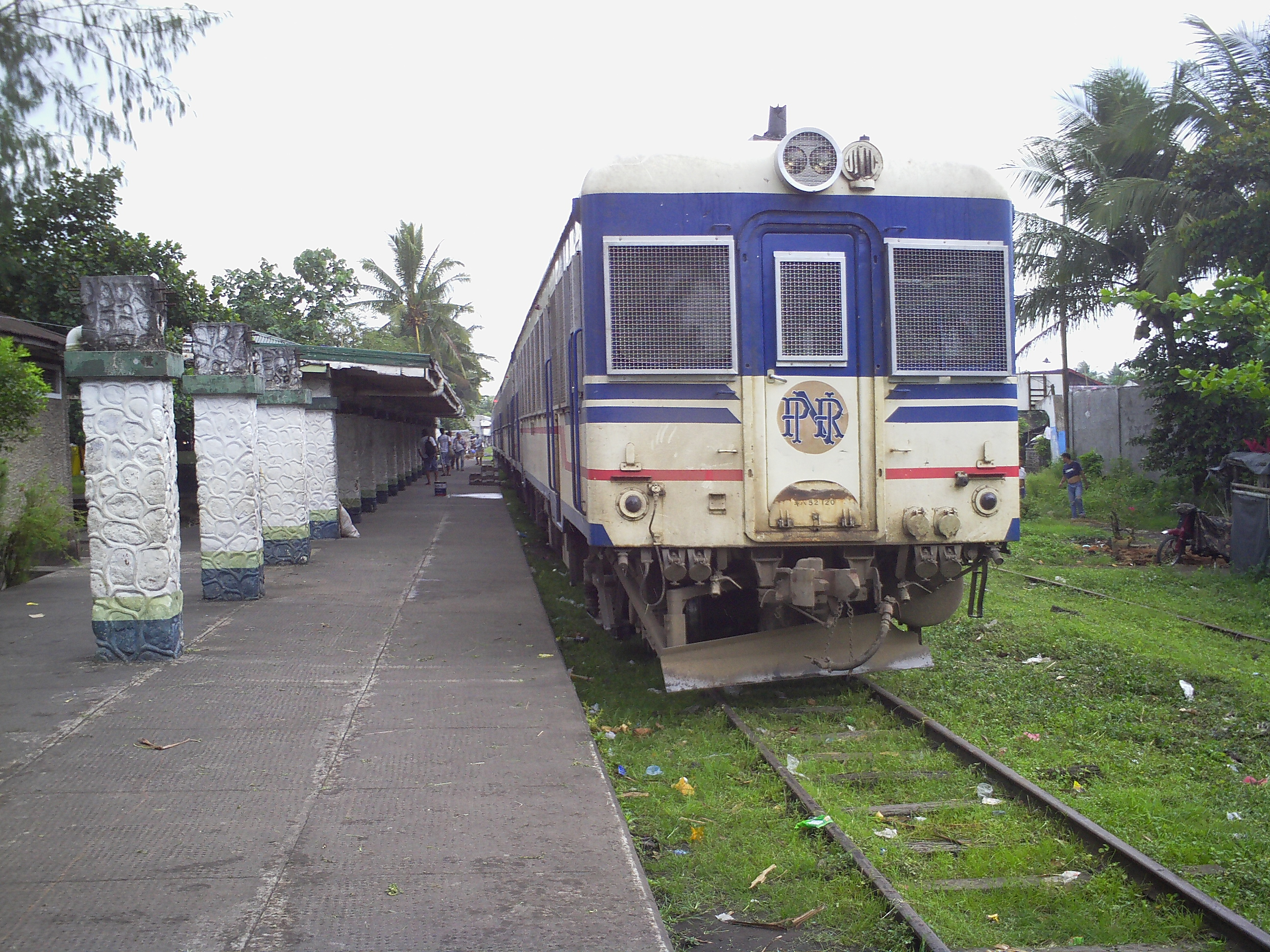
Ligao station

- Matacon – Matacon, Polangui (flag stop)
- Santicon – Santicon, Polangui
- Apad – Apad, Polangui
- Polangui – Polangui
- Oas – Oas (flag stop)
- Ligao – Ligao
- Guinobatan – Masarawag, Guinobatan
- Travesia – Travesia, Guinobatan
- Camalig – Camalig

[Abandoned because of a diversion line built by the PNR to alleviate the original high gradient, lava affected section between Camalig and Daraga]

- Daraga – Sagpon, Daraga
- Washington Drive – 16 Kawit-East Washington Drive, Legazpi (flagstop)
- **Legazpi** (Legaspi) – Legazpi (Terminus for the Legazpi-Tabaco Line)

== Abandoned and inactive branches ==
=== Abandoned ===
==== Tarlac-San Jose branch ====
An abandoned branch line serving Tarlac and Nueva Ecija. This line was also planned to be extended to Cagayan province, with services linking almost all the provinces in the Cagayan Valley. PNR has requested for a feasibility study for the revival of the line, to be connected to the North-South Commuter Railway project.

===== Tarlac =====
- **Tarlac City** – Tarlac City
- Balibago T. – Balibago, Tarlac (flag stop)
- Victoria – Victoria (ruins)
- Canarem – Canarem, Victoria (flag stop)

===== Nueva Ecija =====
- Subol – Subol, Guimba
- Bantug – Bantug, Guimba
- Guimba – Guimba (ruins)
- Matarano – Maturanoc, Gumimba
- Cabaruan – Cabaruan, Guimba
- Gabaldon – Gabaldon, Muñoz
- Palosapis – Palusapis, Muñoz
- Muñoz (Muñoz-Talavera) – Muñoz
- Central Luzon Agricultural College – Central Luzon State University, Muñoz
- **San Jose** – San Jose (ruins)

===== Isabela =====
- Cordon – Cordon
- Santiago – Santiago
- **Echague** (proposed) – Echague (original terminus planned in 1946; line extended to Tuguegarao)

===== Cagayan =====
- Enrile – Enrile
- **Tuguegarao** (proposed) – Tuguegarao

==== Santa Mesa-Antipolo branch ====
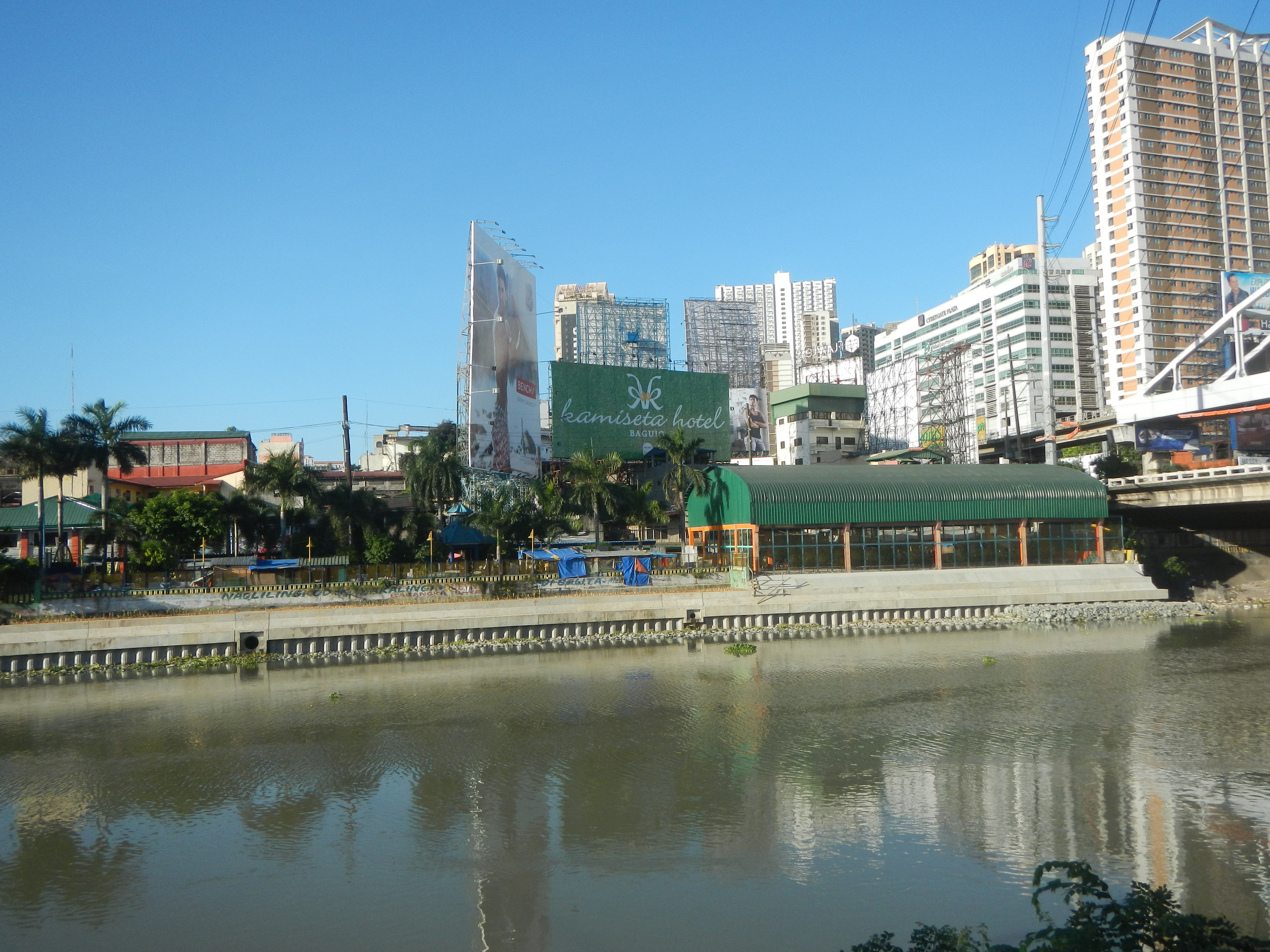
The Mayor Neptali M. Gonzales II Gymnasium, which replaced and sits on the former site of Guadalupe station

Ceased operations when the San Juan River Bridge collapsed. Remains of the old railroad tracks from the old line are still present. The piers of the San Juan River bridge were still standing until they were demolished in 2018 due to the Skyway Stage 3 traversing through the river. It would be only feasible in the future to reactive just the Sta. Mesa-Mandaluyong parts of the line and the bridge rebuilt, with possible elevated tracks on the final segment to the Guadalupe station, which links the PNR to EDSA and MRT Line 3 (the nearest stations are the Guadalupe Station in Makati and Boni Avenue Station in Mandaluyong).

===== Manila =====
- **Santa Mesa** – Bacood, Santa Mesa
- Cordillera – Bacood, Santa Mesa (flag stop, opened in 1974)
- Bagumbayan – Bacood, Santa Mesa (flag stop, opened in 1974)

===== Mandaluyong =====
- Mandaluyong (San Felipe Neri) – Daang Bakal
- Magalona – Daang Bakal (flag stop, opened in 1974)
- A. Bonifacio – Addition Hills (flag stop, opened in 1974)
- Welfareville – Addition Hills
- Boni Avenue – Old Zañiga (flag stop, opened in 1974)
- Zaniga (Saniga) – Old Zañiga (flag stop, opened in 1974)
- Hulo (San Pedro Macati) – Hulo, near San Francisco Street (flag stop)
- **Guadalupe** (Barangka) – Barangka Ilaya, near EDSA, terminus of the line

===== Pasig =====
- Fort McKinley – Kapitolyo
- Pineda – Pineda, near Barangay Hall (flag stop, opened in 1927)
- Bagong Ilog – Bagong Ilog (flag stop, opened in 1928)
- **Pasig** – Pasig
- **Rosario** – Rosario (terminus for the Rosario-Montalban line)

===== Rizal =====
- Cainta – Cainta (opened in 1925)
- Taytay – Taytay (rail yard now serves as a market)
- Hinulugang Taktak – Hinulugang Taktak, Antipolo
- **Antipolo** – Antipolo (corner of Sumulong Memorial Circle and San Jose St.)

==== Balagtas-Cabanatuan branch ====
This line is one of the branch lines that were abandoned after World War II. The line was reopened in 1969; however, it was once again left non-operational in 1980. If reactivated, it will serve thousands of people and tourists as well as provide freight services to the provinces of Bulacan and Nueva Ecija. PNR has requested a feasibility study for a planned revival as a northeast commuter line to Makati, as part of the process for getting the final nod on the project.

===== Bulacan =====
- **Balagtas** (Bigaa) – Balagtas
- Malis – Malis, Guiguinto (also known as Tiaong G.)
- Plaridel (Quingua) – Plaridel
- Baliuag – Baliuag
- Maasim – Maasim, San Ildefonso
- San Ildefonso – San Ildefonso
- San Miguel (San Miguel de Mayumo) – San Miguel
- Pinambaran – Pinambaran, San Miguel

===== Nueva Ecija =====
- Baluarte – Baluarte, Gapan
- San Isidro – San Isidro
- Gapan – Gapan
- Peñaranda – Peñaranda
- Papaya – General Tinio
- San Leonardo – San Leonardo
- Santa Rosa – Santa Rosa
- **Cabanatuan** – Cabanatuan

==== Rosario-Montalban branch ====
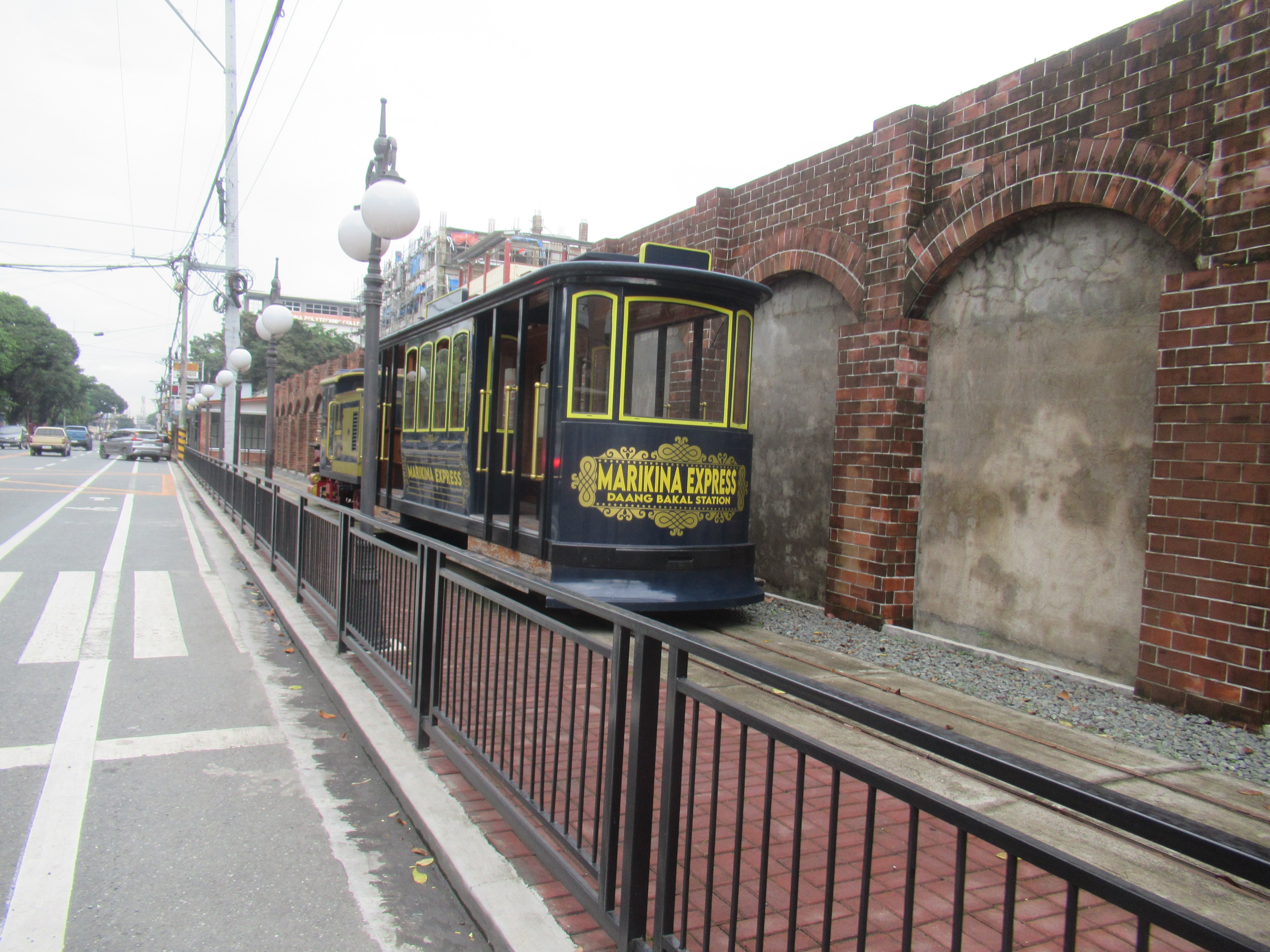
Marikina Express Daang Bakal Station, which lies on the former Rosario-Montalban branch

An abandoned branch line which used to serve the cities of Pasig, Marikina, and the province of Rizal. This alignment is being proposed as a 17-kilometer (11 mi) new spur line of the LRT-2 from the intersection of Munding Avenue and Marcos Highway in Marikina to original terminus in Montalban, Rizal with project name San Mateo railway.

===== Pasig =====
- Rosario – Rosario

===== Marikina =====
- Marikina (Mariquina) – Marikina (still existing)
- Santo Niño – Santo Niño (flag stop, opened in 1927)
- Bayanbayanan – Bayanbayanan
- Nangka – Nangka (flag stop, opened in 1927)

===== Rizal =====
- San Mateo – San Mateo
- Burgos – Burgos, Rodriguez (opened in 1928)
- **Montalban** – Balite, Rodriguez (now serves as a basketball court, at the back of the Our Lady of the Most Holy Rosary Parish)

==== Fort Stotsenburg-Dau branch ====
A line from Fort Stotsenburg in Angeles to Mabalacat, Pampanga

- **Stotsenburg** – Sapangbato, Angeles City
- Margot – Margot, Angeles (opened in 1927)
- **Dau** – Dau, Mabalacat

==== Dau-Magalang branch ====
An abandoned branch line from Dau to Magalang.

- **Dau** – Dau, Mabalacat, Pampanga
- Sapang Biabas – Sapang Biabas, Mabalacat
- Bical – Bical, Mabalacat
- **Magalang** – San Pedro II, Magalang (still existing)

==== Nielson Field branch ====
Abandoned after Nielson Field was closed.

- **Culi-culi** – Pio del Pilar, Makati

==== Legazpi-Tabaco branch ====
Abandoned line that served passengers and cargo going to Tabaco and its harbor.

- **Legazpi** – Legazpi, Albay
- Santo Domingo (Libog) – Santo Domingo, Albay
- Bacacay – Bacacay, Albay
- Malilipot – Malilipot, Albay
- **Tabaco** – Tabaco, Albay

==== Aringay–Asin branch ====
This was a 40.4 km (25.1 mi) spur line meant to connect Aringay, La Union with Baguio. However, tracks actually terminated in Asin in Tuba, Benguet. Construction on the final section leading to Baguio was halted during World War I. The Salapak Tunnel, originally meant for the line, was used during World War II as the regional headquarters of the Imperial Japanese Army. During the PNR era, the right-of-way was sold to residents and became either roads or farmland. The local government of Aringay also proposed to the PNR to convert the Salapak Tunnel into an ecotourism zone, but PNR turned down the request since there are plans to restore the tunnel in the future, referring to the PNR North Long Haul service.

- **Aringay** – Aringay, La Union
- **Asin** – Tuba, Benguet (completed section)
- **Baguio** – Baguio (proposed)

==== San Fabian-Camp One branch ====
This is a line to Camp One, Rosario, La Union. It was the first railroad project attempting to reach Baguio, abandoned however in 1914. A remnant is the triangle junction which was part of the rail tracks, which are now being used as roads.

- **San Fabian** – San Fabian, Pangasinan
- **Binday** – Binday, San Fabian
- Alava – Alava, San Fabian
- **Camp One** – Camp One, Rosario, La Union

==== Arayat-Carmen branch ====
If reactivated, it would serve as a tourist line linking the PNR network to the Mount Arayat National Park and as a faster access to western parts of Pampanga, northern Bataan, southern Zambales and the Subic Bay Freeport Zone, with the possible construction in the future of a rail line linking the two economic zones, which would entail the building of a connector branch to link said line to the PNR system.

- **Arayat** – Arayat, Pampanga
- Sta. Ana – Sta. Ana, Mexico, Pampanga
- Mexico – Mexico
- **San Fernando** – San Fernando, Pampanga
- Pasudeco – Santo Niño, San Fernando
- Bacolor – Bacolor, Pampanga
- Cabetican – Cabetican, Bacolor
- Betis – Betis, Guagua
- Guagua – Guagua, Pampanga
- Santa Monica – Santa Monica, Lubao
- Lubao – Lubao, Pampanga
- San Matias – San Matias, Lubao
- Concepcion – Concepcion, Lubao
- San Francisco – San Francisco, Lubao
- Floridablanca – Floridablanca, Pampanga
- Paguiruan – Paguiruan, Floridablanca
- **Del Carmen** (Carmen) – Del Carmen, Floridablanca

==== Tayug branch ====
If reactivated, the line will serve residents and freight in Pangasinan, Nueva Ecija, and Tarlac, as well as help draw tourists to these provinces.

===== Tarlac =====
- **Paniqui** – Paniqui

===== Nueva Ecija =====
- Nampicuan – Nampicuan
- Cuyapo – Cuyapo
- Bued – Bued, Cuyapo

===== Pangasinan =====
- Calanatuan – Calanutan, Rosales
- Rosales – Rosales
- Balungao – Balungao
- San Leon – San Leon, Balungao
- Cabalitian – Cabalitian, Umingan
- San Pedro – San Pedro, San Quintin (flag stop, still existing)
- **San Quintin** – San Quintin

==== San Pablo-Malvar branch ====
Branch line from San Pablo, Laguna to Malvar, Batangas. It was abandoned after the Los Baños to San Pablo route was built. If reopened, it would serve as an alternative to the main line and a secondary route to Manila and Batangas City.

- **San Pablo** – San Pablo
- Santa Monica – Santa Monica, San Pablo
- Magampon – San Pablo
- Alaminos – Alaminos, Laguna
- San Andres – San Andres, Alaminos
- San Joaquin – San Joaquin, Santo Tomas
- Camballao – San Francisco, Santo Tomas (opened in 1928)
- Salvarrol – San Francisco, Santo Tomas
- **Malvar** (Luta) – Malvar, Batangas

==== Paniqui-Camiling branch ====
Abandoned tram line that was operated by the Tarlac Railway Company.

- **Paniqui** – Paniqui
- Presidencia – Cayanga, Paniqui
- Cabayaoasan – Cabayaoasan, Paniqui
- Tarlac River – Rang-Ayan, Paniqui
- Barang – Barang, Paniqui
- Matubog – Matubog, Camiling
- **Camiling** – Camiling

==== Lingayen-Camiling branch ====
Cancelled during the planning stages. The route was supposed to be from Lingayen, Pangasinan to Camiling, Tarlac.

==== Damortis-Tuba branch ====
Branch line abandoned before the bed was completed and before any bridges had been constructed, the only remains of this line are the two railroad tunnels in Asin Road.

- **Damortis** – Damortis, Rosario, La Union
- **Tuba** (proposed) – Tuba, Benguet

==== Caba-Galiano branch ====
Abandoned before the bed was completed and before any bridges had been constructed

- Caba (proposed) – Caba
- Kapangan (proposed) – Kapangan, Benguet
- La Trinidad (proposed) – La Trinidad, Benguet
- Galiano (proposed) – Atok, Benguet

==== Paco-Naic branch ====
Very few, if not none, of the original line exists today due to the path occupied presently by Ninoy Aquino International Airport and various developments since the line's closure.

- **Paco** – Paco, Manila
- Singalong – 730 Zone 79, Vito Cruz St., Malate, Manila
- Pasay – 64 Zone 8 Pasay [near the Santa Clara de Montefalco church]
- Maricaban (Tabon) – Maricaban, Pasay
- Pildera – Airport Rd. Parañaque (the closest station to NAIA)
- Parañaque – San Dionisio. Parañaque
- Las Piñas – Manuyo Uno, Las Piñas
- Aromahan – Pamplona Uno, Las Piñas
- Zapote – Zapote IV, Bacoor, Cavite
- Panapaan – Panapaan III, Bacoor
- Bacoor – Poblacion, Bacoor, Cavite
- Binacayan – Binacayan, Kawit, Cavite
- Gahak – Gahak, Kawit
- Cavite El Viejo – Kawit, Cavite [formerly Cavite El Viejo]
- San Juan – San Juan, Noveleta
- **Noveleta** – Noveleta, Cavite
- Salinas (Rosario) – Rosario, Cavite
- Tanza – Tanza, Cavite
- **Naic** – Ibayong Estacion, Naic, Cavite

==== San Pedro-Carmona branch ====
This is the last branch line that was used by PNR up to early 2000s. In 2010, the land area of the station in San Jose (now considered on the tip and under the jurisdiction of GMA Cavite between San Pedro and Carmona), was allegedly re-leased to the private sector and the old rails were dismantled halfway up to Olympia Street in Pacita Complex. The old rails still exists from Chrysanthemum Station up to Crismor Ave. in Elvinda near the old San Pedro Station and is at least still in use by the squatter's trolleys. This 3.9-kilometer (2.4 mi) line was opened in 1973.

Though inactive at present, PNR plans to reintroduce services to this branch line.

===== Laguna =====
- **San Pedro** – San Vicente, San Pedro
- Chrysanthemum Village – San Pedro
- **Carmona** – Magsaysay, San Pedro

==== Cavite branch ====
An abandoned branch line serving Cavite City and parts of Noveleta. The first section from Paco to Binakayan, Kawit opened on March 25, 1908 and Binakayan to Noveleta (including Caridad on the Cavite short line) on May 11, 1908. Naic Line started from Paco to Naic, Cavite. At Noveleta station, another spur line leads to Cavite City. Tanza to Naic section was opened in October 20, 1911 but ceased operations and abandoned in 1936. The rail tracks, including sidings between Las Pinas and Naic stations were removed in 1937 and in 1938, the reaming portion up to Paco was finally dismantled. Two bridges at Tanza, Cavite, and Brgy. Halayhay still exists but the tracks are gone.

The Naic line is a defunct line of the Manila Railroad Company.

- Caridad – Caridad, Cavite City
- San Roque – San Roque, Cavite City
- Cavite – Cavite City

The old PNR Tanza station still stands at 257 Tramo, Tanza, Cavite. It is a station on the defunct Naic line. The line from Salinas to Tanza (Santa Cruz de Malabon) in 1911 until 1936 cessation of services.

==== Pandacan-Isla Provisor branch ====
Also known as the Santibañez line. This line had spurs leading to Isla Provisor, Luzon Brokerage Company, the closed Pandacan Oil Depot and the Johnson Picket Rope Company. It ends in what is now the Tabacalera Compound today. The bridge route's crossing in Pasig River is a mechanical swing bridge built to allow bigger ships to pass through. Today, not only is the mechanical component of the bridge nonfunctional, but the bridge itself cannot turn anymore due to the Pandacan Bridge built very close to its turning radius. The very bridge itself is still in use by trains, and occasionally by rickshaws and railskates. It is planned to be rebuilt as part of the NSCR South and the modernized Long Haul project to provide the PNR with a direct link to south central Manila.

- Pandacan (Beata) – Pandacan, Manila
- Santibañez – Paco, Manila

==== Rongos branch ====
A 1.7-kilometer line connecting the former Rongos wharf in the Bicol River for construction purposes. Dismantled after the completion of the South Line in 1938.

- Rongos – Rongos, Libmanan [flag stop]
- Rongos Wharf – Rongos, Libmanan

=== Inactive ===
==== UP Los Baños-Santa Cruz branch ====
This inactive line, when reactivated, could serve passengers and freight in the eastern towns of Laguna, while providing a faster access to tourist and historical destinations within the province.

===== Laguna =====
- **College** – Batong Malake, Los Baños
- Bay – Bay
- Bangyas – Bangyas, Calauan
- Victoria (Dayap) – Victoria
- Manaol – Manaol, Nagcarlan
- Banca-Banca – Banca-Banca, Nagcarlan
- Calumpang – Calumpang, Nagcarlan
- Magdalena – Magdalena
- Cabanbanan (Buboy) – Pagsawitan, Santa Cruz
- Pagsawitan – Pagsawitan, Santa Cruz
- **Santa Cruz** – near the Laguna Provincial Capitol, Santa Cruz
- **Pagsanjan** – Maulawin, Pagsanjan

==== Calamba-Bauan branch ====
Part of the Long-Haul Railway project, it includes the construction of a new line to Bicol. The Calamba-Batangas City section of the branch will be reconstructed into a new single-track line that will be expanded to two when capacity is needed to be expanded.

===== Laguna =====
- **Calamba** – 1, Calamba
- Makiling – Makiling, Calamba

===== Batangas =====
- Santo Tomas – Santo Tomas
- Tanauan – Tanauan
- Malvar (Luta) – Poblacion, Malvar, Batangas [Terminus for the San Pablo-Malvar Line]
- Lipa – Lipa
- San Jose – San Jose
- Batangas – near the Batangas Provincial Capitol
- **Bauan** – Bauan

==== Mamatid-Buntog branch ====
This branch line, currently inactive, is the nearest rail link to the Nuvali residential township of Ayala Land, which extends to Calamba to the south, as well as to Tagaytay. It is also a potential branch line for a revived freight service from Metro Manila in the future, since a multimodal freight terminal was from the 1990s up to 2001 served by this line via container trains from the capital region.

- **Mamatid** – Mamatid, Cabuyao
- Majapa – Majapa, Calamba, Laguna
- **Canlubang** – Canlubang, Calamba
- Locomotive – Canlubang, Calamba
- **Buntog** – Sitio Buntog, Canlubang, Calamba

==== Cabuyao branch ====
The only remnant of this line is a railroad overpass crossing the South Luzon Expressway near Eton City Exit, claimed to be part of Cabuyao. The branch, if active, could have linked Eton City and the urban townships of Santa Rosa to the PNR system, as well as provide freight connections to the nearby industrial complexes and as a faster alternative to the Cavite-Laguna Expressway. Being located near Asian Brewery's facilities, it could also had been a direct connection there.

The Cabuyao branch was part of the Canlubang Estate rail network operated by the Canlubang Sugar Estate, which was linked to the PNR via its Canlubang branch line. This reveals that if so, the branch being connected to the PNR via the branch constituted a major link during the heyday of the sugar plantation, wherein its rail lines stretched northwards into Binan and southwards into Calamba. If revived today, that branch and others of the former CSE complex would have constituted an alternative to road transport options for the industrial complexes and the residential townships of 4 cities in SW Laguna which depend on the PNR's Main Line South, NSCR inclusive.

== See also ==
- Philippine National Railways
