= Sampaloc station =

Railway station in Camarines Sur, Philippines

General information
- Location: Brgy. Sampaloc, Gainza, Camarines Sur
- System: Philippine National Railways
- Owner: Philippine National Railways
- Line: ■ PNR Southrail
- Platforms: Side platform
- Tracks: 1, plus 1 siding track

Construction
- Structure type: At grade
- Accessible: Yes

History
- Opened: 1921

Services
| Preceding station | PNR | Following station |
|---|---|---|
| Pamplona towards Lupi Viejo | Bicol Commuter | Naga towards Legazpi |

Sampaloc station is situated on the PNR Southrail line, serving the Barangay of Sampaloc, Gainza, Camarines Sur. It is currently used for the Bicol Commuter route from Naga to Lupi Viejo.

Service was suspended after several typhoons damaged the station, which was not slated to reopen in 2023, although by 2025, it was included on the timetable for the Lupi Viejo extension of the Naga-Sipocot service, which started on November 5, 2025.

In 2024, a nearby unauthorized crossing was one of 18 closed by PNR within the Bicol region.
