= Libmanan station =

Railway station in Camarines Sur, Philippines

Libmanan
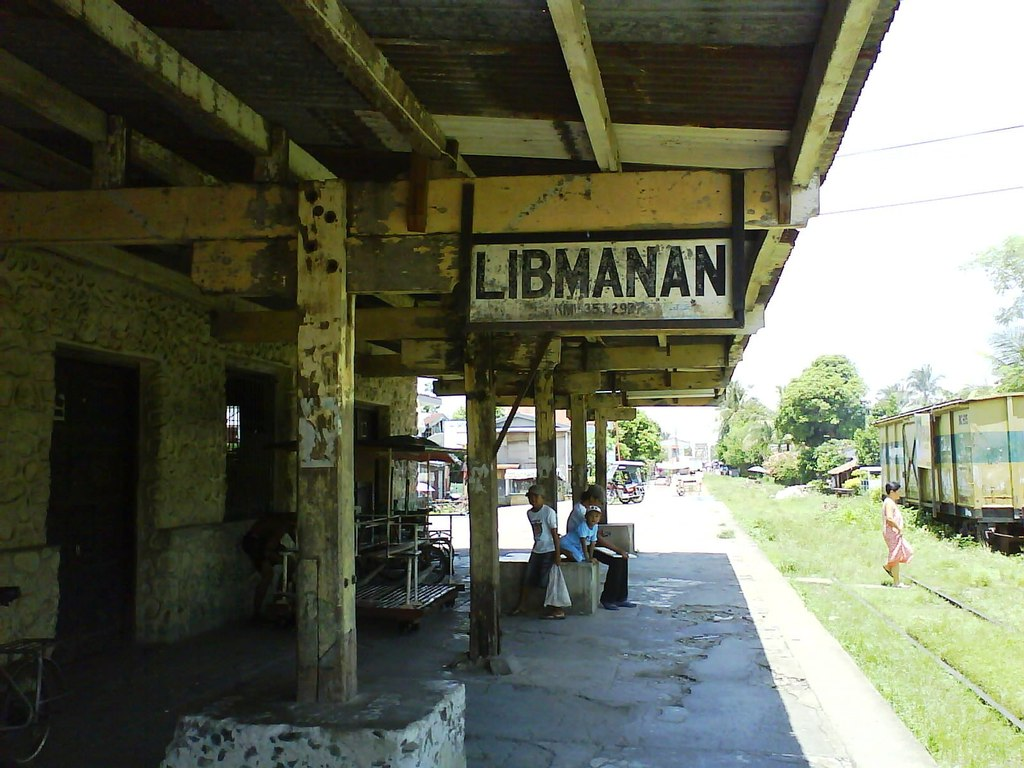

General information
- Location: Dilanco Street, Libmanan
- Coordinates: 13°41′37″N 123°03′28″E
- Owner: Philippine National Railways
- Operator: Philippine National Railways
- Line: South Main Line
- Platforms: Side platform
- Tracks: 1, plus 1 siding track

Construction
- Structure type: At grade
- Accessible: Yes

History
- Opened: February 3, 1929; 97 years ago

Services
| Preceding station | PNR | Following station |
|---|---|---|
| Camambugan towards Lupi Viejo | Bicol Commuter | Rongos towards Legazpi |
| Sipocot towards Tutuban | Bicol Express | Pamplona towards Legazpi |
| Sipocot towards Tutuban | Isarog Limited | Pamplona towards Naga |
Location

Libmanan station is a railway station located on the South Main Line in Camarines Sur, Philippines. It is still use for the Bicol Commuter Naga-Sipocot line.

== History ==
Libmanan was opened on February 3, 1929 as part of the expansion of the Legazpi Division Line from Tabaco, Albay to Libmanan, through passenger services to and from Manila commenced on January 31, 1938 after the Legazpi Division Line and Main Line South were merged into a continuous network called the Manila-Legazpi Line.

After years of neglect PNR Naga station Last Repair works were done in 2014 , when PNR was given Php1.7B for Manila-Bicol line rehab. Since then the station has deteriorated and fallen to disrepair.

On 23 August 2024 PNR Libaman station was chosen to be modernized and be brought up to standard. Construction works was awarded to JFRespeto Construction.
