= Gumaca station =

Railway station in Philippines

Gumaca

General information
- Location: Capisonda Street, Gumaca
- Coordinates: 13°55′13″N 122°06′10″E
- Owner: Philippine National Railways
- Operator: Philippine National Railways
- Line: South Main Line
- Platforms: Side platform
- Tracks: 1, plus 1 siding track

Construction
- Structure type: At grade
- Accessible: Yes

History
- Opened: May 10, 1916; 110 years ago

Services
Preceding station	PNR	Following station
Plaridel towards Tutuban	Bicol Express	Hondagua towards Legazpi
Plaridel towards Tutuban	Isarog Limited	Hondagua towards Naga
Location

Gumaca is a railway station located on the South Main Line in Quezon, Philippines. It was used for services such as the Bicol Express and Isarog Limited until 2012, and is currently disused while services remain suspended along much of the South Main Line.

== History ==
Gumaca was opened on May 10, 1916, as part of the extension of the Main Line South from Padre Burgos to Calauag, Quezon. The western side of the station building was demolished to give way for a new one.

Passenger trains have not used this station since October 2012, when a derailment caused the indefinite suspension of most of the South Main Line. Due to typhoon damage, informal settlers and other track obstructions, only maintenance and inspection trains have operated along this section since, with PNR continually undertaking repair work to return services along the line.

In October 2020, a test train derailed just outside of the town at the Lagyo Crossing. Local authorities believed that recently laid asphalt caused the derailment.
