= Balagtas station =

Railway station in Balagtas, Bulacan, Philippines

Balagtas
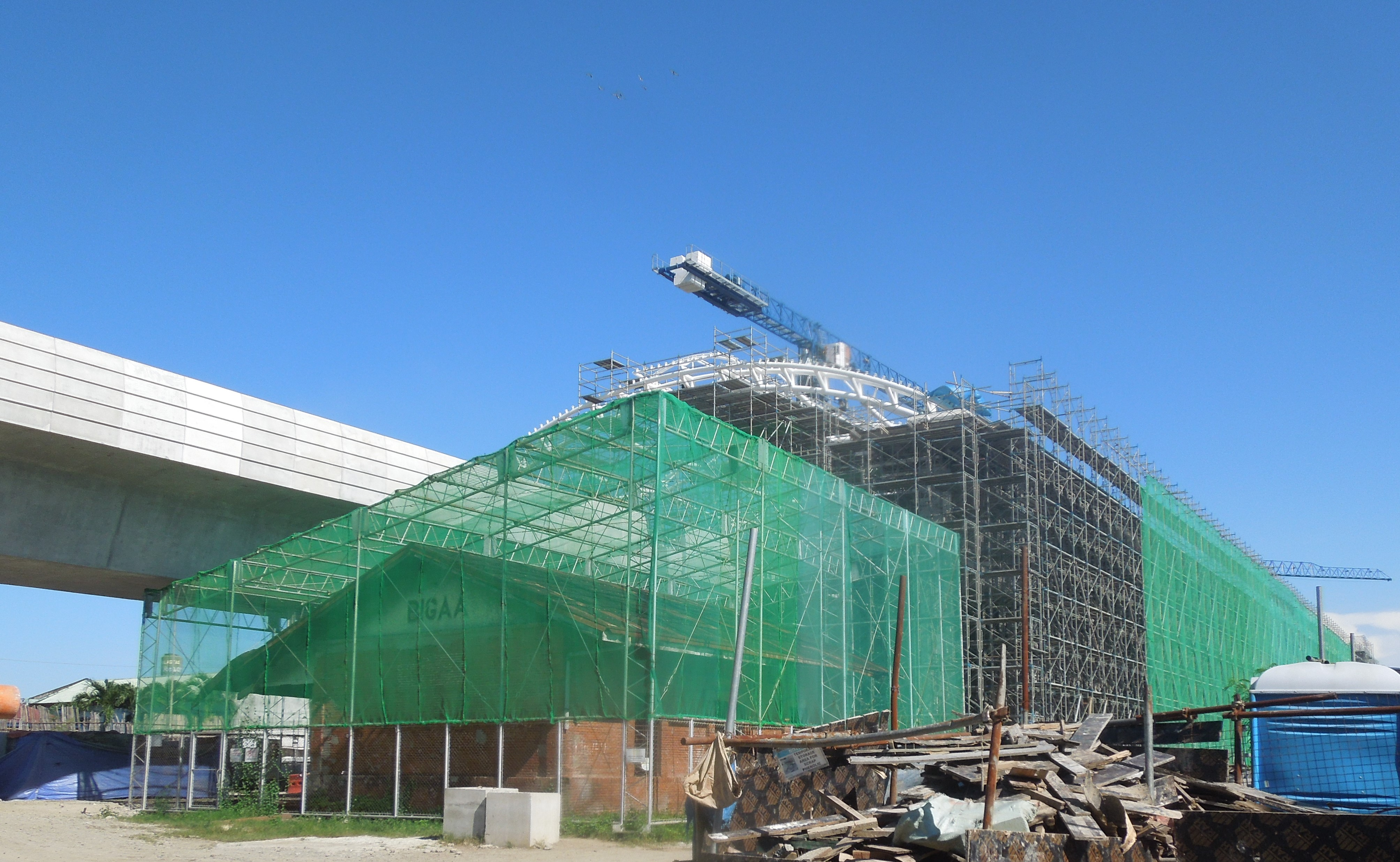
- The old Bigaa Station in protective sheathing dwarfed by the future Balagtas Station

General information
- Location: Borol 1st Balagtas, Bulacan; Philippines
- Coordinates: 14°49′31″N 120°54′22″E
- Owner: Philippine National Railways
- Operator: Philippine National Railways
- Lines: Planned: North Commuter; Former: North Main Line
- Platforms: Side platform
- Tracks: 2

Construction
- Structure type: Elevated

Other information
- Status: Under construction

History
- Closed: 1984, 1990s
- Rebuilt: 2019–ongoing
- Former names: Bigaa

Services
Commuter rail
Location
- Location within Bulacan Location within Luzon Location within Philippines

Balagtas station is an under-construction elevated North–South Commuter Railway (NSCR) station located in Balagtas, Bulacan, Philippines. The station was part of the Philippine National Railways (PNR) North Main Line before its closure in the 1980s. It was also the terminus of the defunct Balagtas–Cabanatuan line.

== History ==
The original station was constructed in the 1880s, along with other stations in the North Main Line (then known as the Ferrocarril de Manila a Dagupan) as Bigaa station. The station was closed in the 1980s after operations in the north were reduced to Caloocan, but was briefly reopened between 1990 and 1997 under the Metrotren program, a commuter rail service to Malolos.

After the line's closure, several attempts were made to electrify the commuter rail service in Metro Manila from Calamba, Laguna to Malolos, and connect it to the Clark Freeport and Special Economic Zone, which would also involve the construction of a new Balagtas station. The first attempt was the Manila–Clark rapid railway project with the assistance of Spain, which was discontinued after disagreements in the project's funding. The second attempt was the NorthRail project, which involved the construction of an elevated dual-track system. The project was started in 2007, but was repeatedly halted then discontinued in 2011 due to allegations of overpricing and corruption.

The NorthRail project was later revived as the North–South Commuter Railway (NSCR), which involved the construction of an elevated dual-track system in three phases. The construction of the new station is part of the NSCR's first phase, PNR Clark 1. The Philippine National Railways (PNR) is also planning to revive the defunct Balagtas–Cabanatuan line, with this station as its terminus. Construction work began in February 2019. As part of the project, the historical station will also be preserved. Structural works for the station were completed in April 2022. Partial operations are slated to begin by 2027.

== Gallery ==
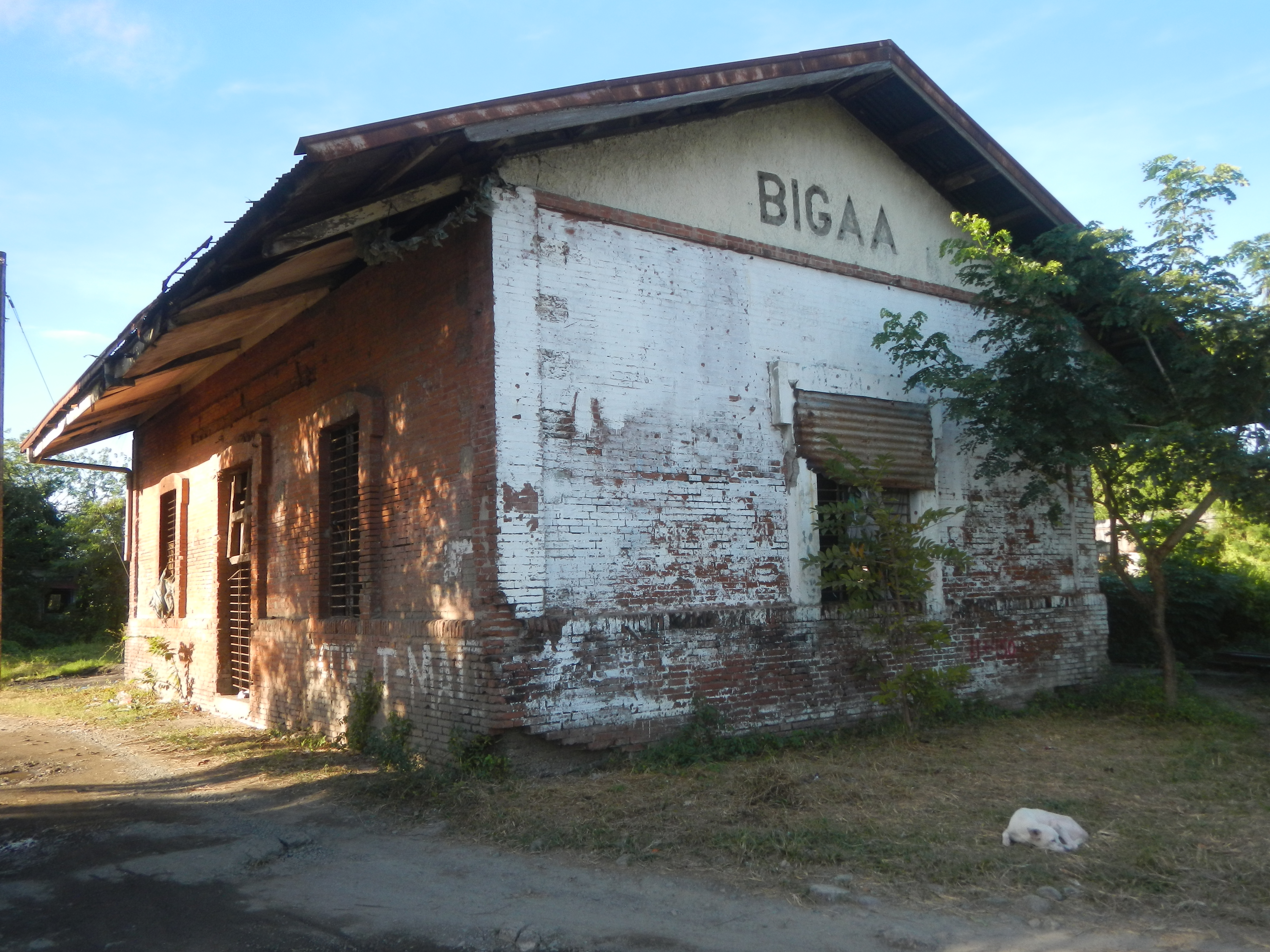
The old station.

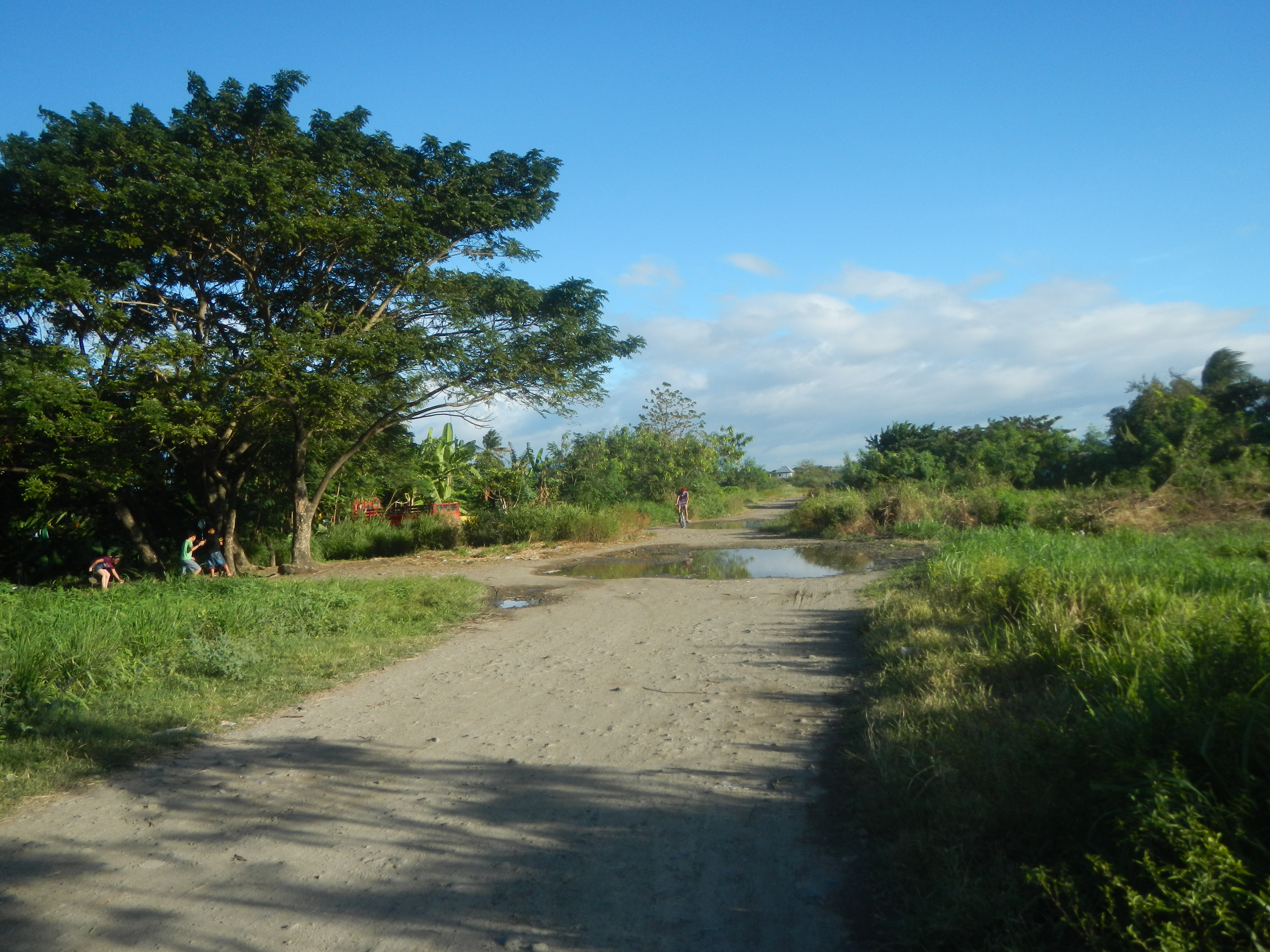
The railway's right of way before construction.

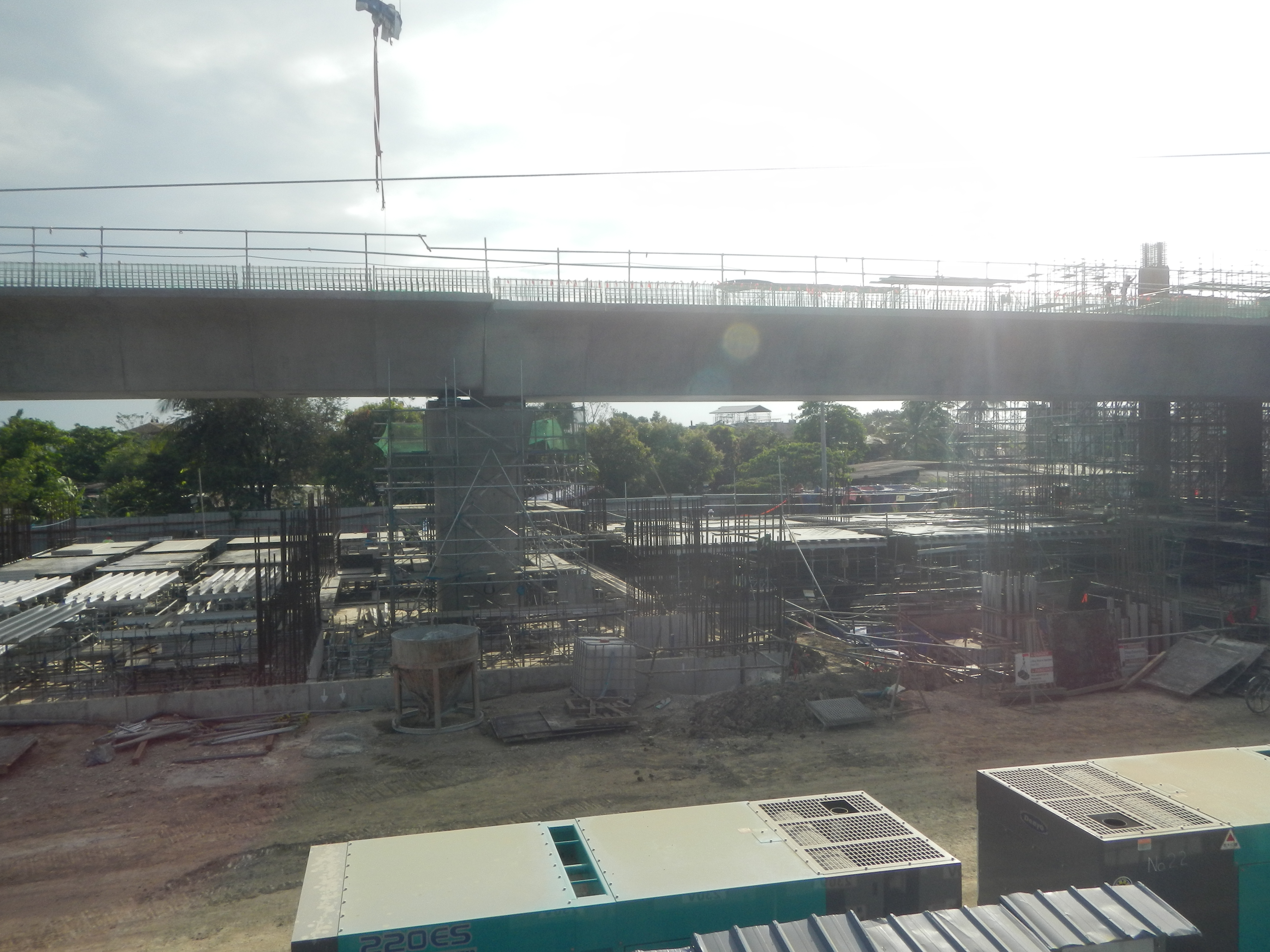
Construction of the station, March 2021.

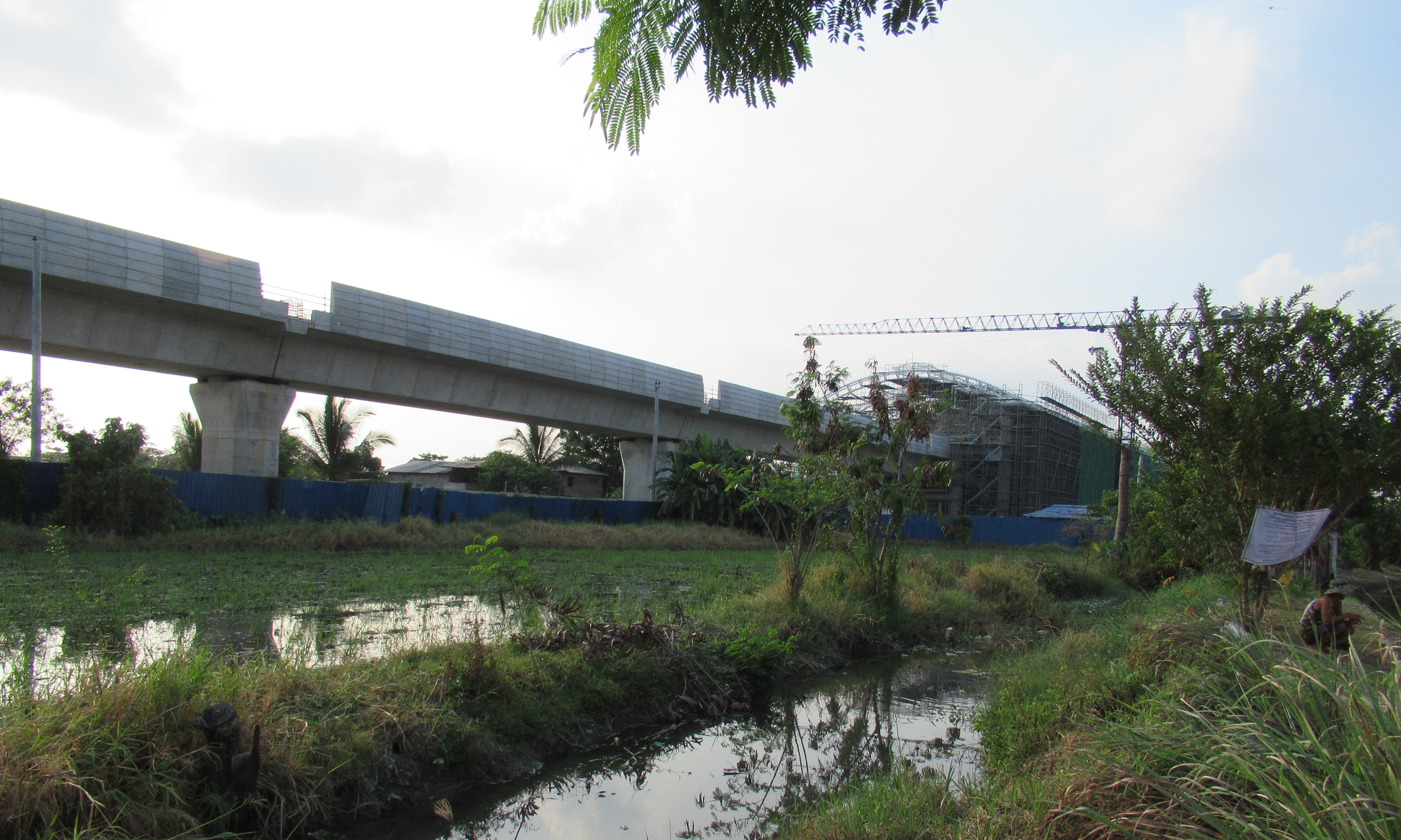
Construction of the station, December 2021
