= Alacan station =

Railway station in the Philippines

Alacan

General information
- Location: Brgy. Alacan, San Fabian, Pangasinan; Philippines
- Operator: Philippine National Railways
- Line: Northrail

Alacan station is a defunct station of the Philippine National Railways Northrail in Brgy. Alacan, San Fabian, Pangasinan.
