= Tayuman station (PNR) =

Tayuman station is a former railway station located on the South Main Line of the Philippine National Railways (PNR). It served as a temporary station in 1994 when the historic Tutuban station was being converted into a mall and while the new Tutuban station Executive Building in Mayhaligue Street is being built.
