= Pamplona station =

Railway station in Camarines Sur, Philippines

Pamplona
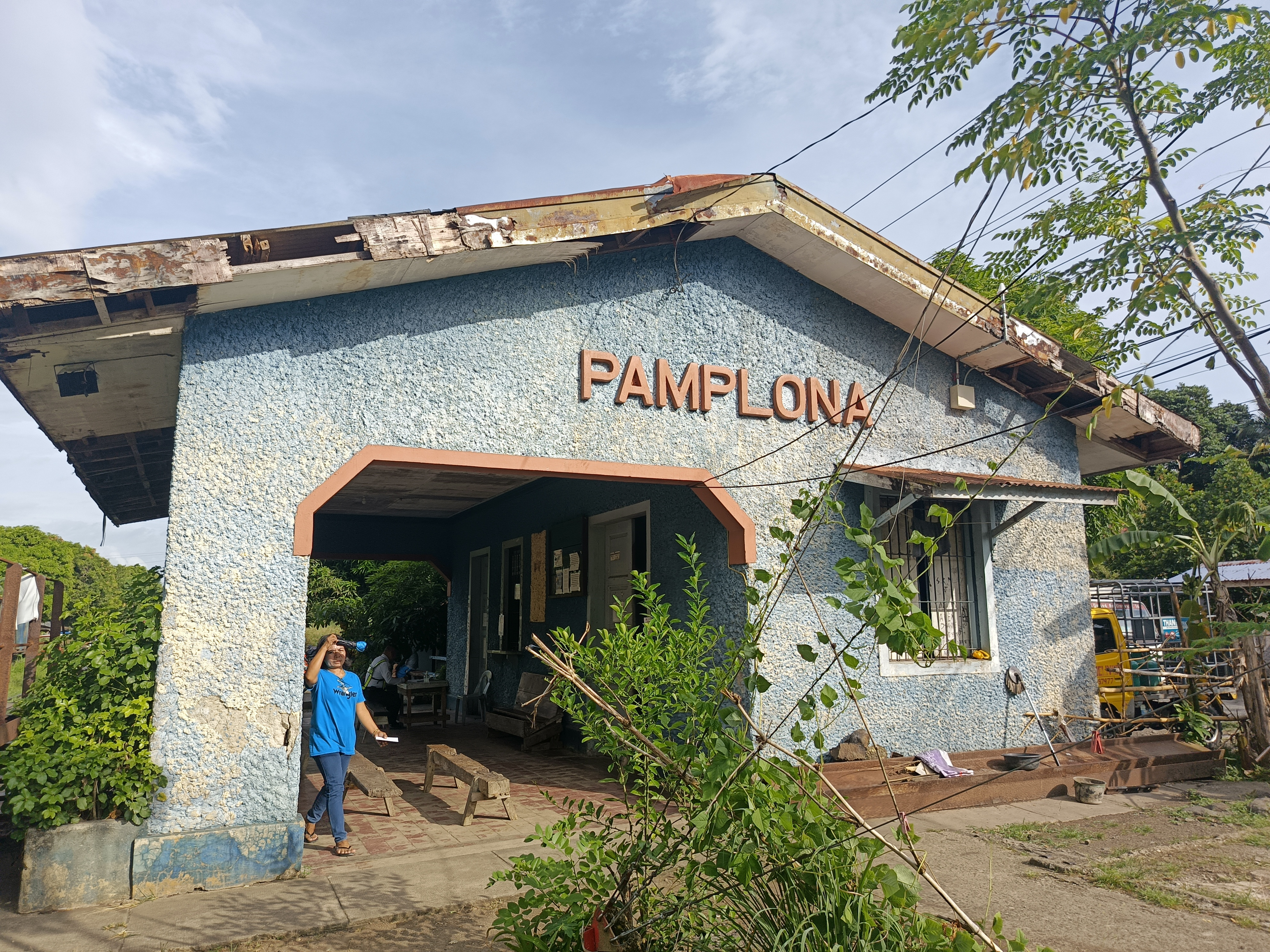

General information
- Location: Zone 5, Dalipay Street, Poblacion, Pamplona, Camarines Sur
- Coordinates: 13°35′32″N 123°04′49″E
- Owner: Philippine National Railways
- Operator: Philippine National Railways
- Line: South Main Line
- Platforms: Side platform
- Tracks: 1, plus 1 siding track

Construction
- Structure type: At grade
- Accessible: Yes

History
- Opened: October 18, 1921
- Rebuilt: 1939

Services
Preceding station	PNR	Following station
Mambulo towards Lupi Viejo	Bicol Commuter	Burabod towards Legazpi
Libmanan towards Tutuban	Bicol Express	Naga towards Legazpi
Libmanan towards Tutuban	Isarog Limited	Naga Terminus
Location

Pamplona station is a railway station located in the South Main Line at Pamplona, Camarines Sur, Philippines. It is one of the stops of the Bicol Express and Isarog Limited Express trains until the suspension of the intercity trips. The station is currently in use for the Bicol Commuter Train.

== History ==
The section of the Legazpi Division Line from Naga to Pamplona was opened on October 18, 1921. The rubble stone station building, originally a wooden structure, was rebuilt around 1939.

After years of neglect PNR Pamplona station Last Repair works were done in 2014 , when PNR was given Php1.7B for Manila-Bicol line rehab. Since then the station has deteriorated and fallen to disrepair.
