= Sipocot station =

Railway station in Camarines Sur, Philippines

Sipocot

General information
- Location: Sipocot
- Coordinates: 13°46′08″N 122°58′39″E
- Owner: Philippine National Railways
- Operator: Philippine National Railways
- Line: South Main Line
- Platforms: Side platform
- Tracks: 1, plus 1 siding track

Construction
- Structure type: At grade
- Accessible: Yes

History
- Opened: 1930

Services
Preceding station	PNR	Following station
Lupi Viejo Terminus	Bicol Commuter	Awayan towards Legazpi
Ragay towards Tutuban	Bicol Express	Libmanan towards Legazpi
Ragay towards Tutuban	Isarog Limited	Libmanan towards Naga
Location

Sipocot station is a railway station located on the South Main Line in Camarines Sur, Philippines. The station is used for the Bicol Commuter, which operates between Naga and Lupi Viejo. It was formerly used by long-distance services to Manila, such as the Bicol Express and Isarog Limited until 2012.

The station's passenger facilities include a platform, shelter, and ticket office. The station yard contains a siding track, allowing locomotive-hauled trains to terminate and run around at this location.

== History ==
Sipocot station opened in July 1930 as part of an extension from Libmanan. It remained the terminus of the line from Legazpi until September 13, 1931, when the line was extended to Lupi Viejo.

In June 2011, the Bicol Express returned to operation following a few years of being suspended. However, it was disrupted by a washed out embankment at Sipocot, and the train was eventually allowed to pass over the track dip at a very slow speed after temporary reinforcements.

Due to the suspension of the Bicol Express since October 2012, Sipocot had remained the northernmost extent of passenger train operations in the Bicol Region for years, served only by the Bicol Commuter from Naga. With the PNR undertaking continual maintenance and repairs during this time, the Bicol Commuter was finally extended beyond Sipocot to Lupi Viejo on November 5, 2025.

== Current Services ==
The Bicol Commuter serves Sipocot station with up to 3 round trips a day. Sipocot is still occasionally used as a terminus when maintenance is required on the Sipocot-Lupi Viejo section.
