= Agdangan station =

Agdangan
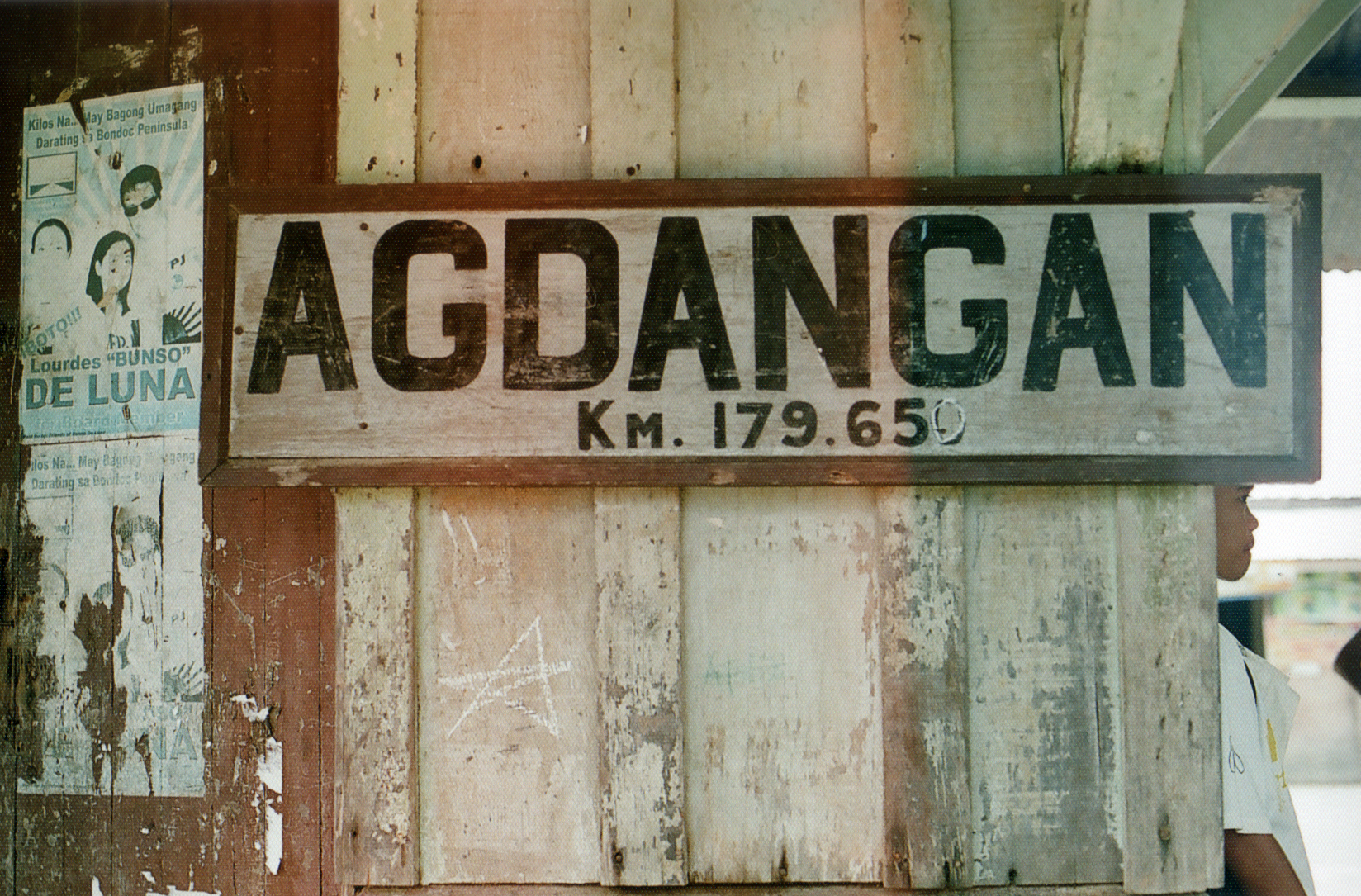
- Sign at the station in 2008

General information
- Location: Rodriguez Jr, Agdangan
- Coordinates: 13.8774°N 121.9175°E
- Owner: Philippine National Railways
- Operator: Philippine National Railways
- Line: South Main Line
- Platforms: Side platform
- Tracks: 1, plus 1 siding track

Construction
- Structure type: At grade
- Accessible: Yes

History
- Opened: May 10, 1916; 110 years ago

Services
Preceding station	PNR	Following station
Lucena towards Tutuban	Bicol Express	Plaridel towards Legazpi
Lucena towards Tutuban	Isarog Limited	Plaridel towards Naga
Location

Agdangan is a railway station located on the South Main Line in Quezon, Philippines. It was used for services such as the Bicol Express and Isarog Limited until 2012, and is currently disused while services remain suspended along much of the South Main Line.

== History ==
Agdangan was opened on May 10, 1916, then located in Unisan, as part of the expansion of the Main Line South to Calauag. It became part of the newly-established town of Agdangan in 1939. Passenger trains have not used this station since October 2012, when a derailment caused the indefinite suspension of most of the South Main Line. Due to typhoon damage, informal settlers and other track obstructions, only maintenance and inspection trains have operated along this section since, with PNR continually undertaking repair work to return services along the line.
