= Hondagua station =

Hondagua

General information
- Location: Hondagua, Lopez
- Coordinates: 13°53′16″N 122°15′28″E
- Owner: Philippine National Railways
- Operator: Philippine National Railways
- Line: South Main Line
- Platforms: Side platform
- Tracks: 1, plus 3 siding tracks

Construction
- Structure type: At grade
- Accessible: Yes

History
- Opened: May 10, 1916; 110 years ago

Services
Preceding station	PNR	Following station
Gumaca towards Tutuban	Bicol Express	Tagkawayan towards Legazpi
Gumaca towards Tutuban	Isarog Limited	Tagkawayan towards Naga
Location

Hondagua is a railway station located on the South Main Line in Quezon, Philippines. It was used for services such as the Bicol Express and Isarog Limited until 2012, and is currently disused while services remain suspended along much of the South Main Line.

== History ==
Hondagua was opened on May 10, 1916 as part of the extension of the Main Line South from Padre Burgos to Calauag via Hondagua.

Passenger trains have not used this station since October 2012, when a derailment caused the indefinite suspension of most of the South Main Line. Due to typhoon damage, informal settlers and other track obstructions, only maintenance and inspection trains have operated along this section since, with PNR continually undertaking repair work to return services along the line.

Maintenance works took place in Hondagua in July 2026 on a small bridge, with PNR posting updates to their Facebook page.
