= Plaridel station =

Plaridel

General information
- Location: Pan-Philippine Highway, Plaridel
- Coordinates: 13°57′20.46″N 122°1′5.37″E
- Owner: Philippine National Railways
- Operator: Philippine National Railways
- Line: South Main Line
- Platforms: Side platform
- Tracks: 1, plus 1 siding track

Construction
- Structure type: At grade
- Accessible: Yes

History
- Opened: May 10, 1916; 110 years ago
- Former names: Siain

Services
Preceding station	PNR	Following station
Agdangan towards Tutuban	Bicol Express	Gumaca towards Legazpi
Agdangan towards Tutuban	Isarog Limited	Gumaca towards Naga
Location

Plaridel station is a railway station on the South Main Line in Quezon, Philippines. It is located adjacent to the Siain Port and the Pan-Philippine Highway. It was used for services such as the Bicol Express and Isarog Limited until 2012, and is currently disused while services remain suspended along much of the South Main Line.

== History ==
It was opened on May 10, 1916 as Siain, then located in Atimonan until the creation of Plaridel in 1962.

Passenger trains have not used this station since October 2012, when a derailment caused the indefinite suspension of most of the South Main Line. Due to typhoon damage, informal settlers and other track obstructions, only maintenance and inspection trains have operated along this section since, with PNR continually undertaking repair work to return services along the line.
