= Tagkawayan station =

Tagkawayan

General information
- Location: G. Eleazar Street, Tagkawayan, Quezon
- Coordinates: 13°57′44″N 122°32′24″E
- Owner: Philippine National Railways
- Operator: Philippine National Railways
- Line: South Main Line
- Platforms: Side platform
- Tracks: 1, plus 2 sidings

Construction
- Structure type: At grade
- Accessible: Yes

History
- Opened: January 11, 1938

Services
Preceding station	PNR	Following station
Hondagua towards Tutuban	Bicol Express	Ragay towards Legazpi
Hondagua towards Tutuban	Isarog Limited	Ragay towards Naga
Location

Tagkawayan station is a railway station located on the South Main Line in Tagkawayan, Quezon, Philippines. Serving the Tagkawayan municipal proper, it was used for services such as the Bicol Express and Isarog Limited until 2012, and is currently disused while services remain suspended along much of the South Main Line.

== History ==
Tagkawayan was opened on January 11, 1938 when the first freight service from Manila to Legazpi commenced, passenger services started on January 31.

On April 16, 1995 an IED had detonated on the tracks, with the perpetrators never being found.

Passenger trains have not used this station since October 2012, when a derailment caused the indefinite suspension of most of the South Main Line. Due to typhoon damage, informal settlers and other track obstructions, only maintenance and inspection trains have operated along this section since, with PNR continually undertaking repair work to return services along the line.

While services from Tagkawayan to Naga City had been touted to return as early as 2021, trains along this full section remain suspended as of 2026 due to damage from natural disasters, with Lupi Viejo being the current eastern extent of services from Naga. PNR completed repairs of the Binahan Bridge in Ragay in June 2025, with the hope of finally re-establishing services from Naga into Quezon province. However, Typhoon Uwan caused the partial collapse of another bridge in Ragay during November 2025, between Barangay Apad and Barangay Cale. Instead, the Pasay-Tiwi bus serves riders in the meantime.
