= Ragay station =

Railway station in Camarines Sur, Philippines

Ragay

General information
- Location: Apad Road, Ragay
- Coordinates: 13°48′55″N 122°46′03″E
- Owner: Philippine National Railways
- Operator: Philippine National Railways
- Line: South Main Line
- Platforms: Side platform
- Tracks: 1, plus 1 siding track

Construction
- Structure type: At grade
- Accessible: Yes

History
- Opened: August 28, 1933

Services
Preceding station	PNR	Following station
Tagkawayan towards Tutuban	Bicol Express	Lupi Viejo towards Legazpi
Tagkawayan towards Tutuban	Isarog Limited	Lupi Viejo towards Naga
Location

Ragay station is a railway station located on the South Main Line in Camarines Sur, Philippines. It was used for services such as the Bicol Express and Isarog Limited until 2012, and is currently disused while services remain suspended along much of the South Main Line.

== History ==
Ragay was opened on August 28, 1933, as part of the expansion of the Legazpi Division line to Port Ragay. Through services to and from Manila commenced on January 31, 1938.

Passenger trains have not used this station since October 2012, when a derailment caused the indefinite suspension of most of the South Main Line. Due to typhoon damage, informal settlers and other track obstructions, only maintenance and inspection trains have operated along this section since, with PNR continually undertaking repair work to return services along the line.

Repair works were done in 2014, when PNR was given Php1.7B for the rehabilitation of the Manila-Bicol line. Since then the station has deteriorated and fallen into disrepair.

PNR completed repairs of the Binahan Bridge in Ragay in June 2025, with the hope of finally re-establishing services from Naga into Quezon province. However, Typhoon Uwan caused the partial collapse of another bridge in Ragay during November 2025, between Barangay Apad and Barangay Cale. Ragay remains inaccessible by rail while the bridge awaits repairs.
