= Lupi Viejo station =

Railway station in Camarines Sur, Philippines

Coordinates: 13°47′18″N 122°54′27″E

Lupi Viejo

General information
- Location: Lupi, Camarines Sur
- Owner: Philippine National Railways
- Operator: Philippine National Railways
- Line: South Main Line
- Platforms: Side platform
- Tracks: 1, plus 1 siding track

Construction
- Structure type: At grade
- Accessible: Yes

History
- Opened: September 13, 1931; 94 years ago November 5, 2025; 9 months ago (reopened)

Services
Preceding station	PNR	Following station
Terminus	Bicol Commuter	Sipocot towards Legazpi
Ragay towards Tutuban	Bicol Express	Sipocot towards Legazpi
Ragay towards Tutuban	Isarog Limited	Sipocot towards Naga
Location

Lupi Viejo station or Lupi station is a station located on the PNR South Main Line in Lupi, Camarines Sur. It is the current northern terminus of the Bicol Commuter.

The station's passenger facilities include a platform, shelter, and ticket office. The station yard contains a siding track, allowing locomotive-hauled trains to terminate and run around at this location.

== History ==
Lupi Viejo was opened on September 13, 1931 as part of the further expansion of the Legazpi Division Line from Tabaco to Lupi via Legazpi and Naga.

The station fell into disuse from October 2012 to December 2025, when a derailment caused the indefinite suspension of most of the South Main Line. Due to typhoon damage, informal settlers and other track obstructions, only maintenance and inspection trains operated through Lupi Viejo for 13 years, with PNR undertaking repair work to return services over this time period.

During the Marcos Administration, the station building was renovated throughout 2025, as part of improvements to the Bicol Commuter service.

Service returned to the station on November 5, 2025 under the service Naga–Sipocot–Lupi.
