= Bato station =

Station of the Philippine National Railways

Bato

General information
- Location: Bato
- Owner: Philippine National Railways
- Operator: Philippine National Railways
- Line: South Main Line
- Platforms: Side platform
- Tracks: 1, plus 1 siding track

Construction
- Structure type: At grade
- Accessible: Yes

Services
Preceding station	PNR	Following station
Baao towards Lupi Viejo	Bicol Commuter	Polangui towards Legazpi

Bato station is a railway station located on the South Main Line in Camarines Sur, Philippines. It was last used for the Bicol Commuter service.

After 6 years of suspension due to insufficient rolling stock, the station returned to operation with the reopening of the Naga–Ligao route on July 31, 2023. This service was extended all the way to the end of the line at Legazpi on December 27, 2023.

On 10 November 2025, trains serving the station were suspended after Typhoon Uwan caused significant damage to a bridge along the Naga-Legazpi route in Guinobatan, Albay, with the Department of Transport (DOTr) immediately issuing a directive to fast-track repairs. Despite an initial reopening date of February 2026, services remain suspended as of July 2026. An inspection of the bridge was carried out on July 13, 2026, and damaged sleepers were removed while PNR continues the procurement process for machinery and materials to carry out the repair.
