= Travesia station =

Railway station in Albay, Philippines

Travesia

General information
- Location: Travesia, Guinobatan
- Coordinates: 13°11′24.26″N 123°36′55.23″E
- Owner: Philippine National Railways
- Operator: Philippine National Railways
- Line: South Main Line
- Platforms: Side platform
- Tracks: 1, plus 1 siding track

Construction
- Structure type: At grade

History
- Opened: February 23, 1986
- Rebuilt: 2015

Services
Preceding station	PNR	Following station
Ligao towards Lupi Viejo	Bicol Commuter	Daraga towards Legazpi
Location
- Location within Albay Location within Luzon Location within Philippines

Travesia station is a railway station located on the South Main Line in Albay, Philippines. It was last used for the Bicol Commuter service.

== History ==
Travesia was built around 1981 as a replacement for the Guinobatan station after a bypass line was built to avoid the steep grades at Camalig. However, it was not until February 23, 1986, when services resumed and the station opened.

After years of neglect PNR Travesia station Last Repair works were done in 2014, when PNR was given Php1.7B for Manila-Bicol line rehab. Since then the station has deteriorated and fallen to disrepair.

The PNR Travesia Station in Albat stands as a vital link in the regional transportation network. However, Due to Budget constraints the project in 2019 to repair the station was deferred. With time, the station has deteriorated significantly, necessitating an exhaustive reconstruction effort.

The station returned to operation with the reopening of the Naga–Legazpi route on December 27, 2023.

On 10 November 2025, trains serving the station were suspended after Typhoon Uwan caused significant damage to a bridge along the Naga-Legazpi route in Guinobatan, Albay, with the Department of Transport (DOTr) immediately issuing a directive to fast-track repairs. Despite an initial reopening date of February 2026, services remain suspended as of July 2026. An inspection of the bridge was carried out on July 13, 2026, and damaged sleepers were removed while PNR continues the procurement process for machinery and materials to carry out the repair.
