= Pili station =

Railway station in Camarines Sur, Philippines

Pili

General information
- Location: Pili
- Coordinates: 13°33′19″N 123°16′20″E
- Owner: Philippine National Railways
- Operator: Philippine National Railways
- Line: South Main Line
- Platforms: Side platform
- Tracks: 1, plus 1 siding track

Construction
- Structure type: At grade
- Accessible: Yes

History
- Opened: April 1, 1920; 106 years ago

Services
Preceding station	PNR	Following station
Naga towards Lupi Viejo	Bicol Commuter	Baao towards Legazpi
Location

Pili station is a railway station located on the South Main Line in Camarines Sur, Philippines. It was last used for the Bicol Commuter service.

== History ==
Pili was opened on April 1, 1920, as part of the expansion of the Legazpi Division line from Tabaco, Albay to Nueva Caceras (Naga), through freight services to and from Manila commenced on January 11, 1938 and passenger services on January 31.

After years of neglect PNR Pili station Last Repair works were done in 2014, when PNR was given Php1.7B for Manila-Bicol line rehab. Since then the station has deteriorated and fallen to disrepair.

The PNR Pili Station in Camarines Sur stands as a vital link in the regional transportation network. However, Due to Budget constraints the project in 2019 to repair the station was deferred. With time, the station has deteriorated significantly, necessitating an exhaustive reconstruction effort.

In 2023, a Project to rehabilitate the station was bid out. This endeavor encompassed the complete overhaul of both the passenger shelter and platform. A crucial aspect of the project involved ensuring that the platform height elevated at 1.20 meters over a stretch of 120 meters from the top of the rail, ensuring enhanced accessibility and functionality

After 6 years of suspension due to insufficient rolling stock, the station returned to operation with the reopening of the Naga–Ligao route on July 31, 2023. This service was extended all the way to the end of the line at Legazpi on December 27, 2023.

On 10 November 2025, trains serving the station were suspended after Typhoon Uwan caused significant damage to a bridge along the Naga-Legazpi route in Guinobatan, Albay, with the Department of Transport (DOTr) immediately issuing a directive to fast-track repairs. Despite an initial reopening date of February 2026, services remain suspended as of July 2026. An inspection of the bridge was carried out on July 13, 2026, and damaged sleepers were removed while PNR continues the procurement process for machinery and materials to carry out the repair.
