= Polangui station =

Railway station in Albay, Philippines

Polangui

General information
- Location: Polangui
- Coordinates: 13°17′24″N 123°29′31″E
- Owner: Philippine National Railways
- Operator: Philippine National Railways
- Line: South Main Line
- Platforms: Side platform
- Tracks: 1, plus 1 siding track

Construction
- Structure type: At grade
- Accessible: Yes

History
- Opened: November 1914
- Rebuilt: 2015

Services
Preceding station	PNR	Following station
Matacon towards Lupi Viejo	Bicol Commuter	Oas towards Legazpi
Bato towards Tutuban	Bicol Express	Ligao towards Legazpi
Location

Polangui station is a railway station located on the South Main Line in Albay, Philippines. It was last used for the Bicol Commuter.

== History ==
Polangui was opened in November 1914 as part of the Legazpi Division Line.

After years of neglect PNR Polangui station Last Repair works were done in 2014, when PNR was given Php1.7B for Manila-Bicol line rehab. The station building was reconstructed and reopened on September 18, 2015. for the Bicol Commuter services. Since then the station has deteriorated and fallen to disrepair.

The PNR Polangui Station in Albay stands as a vital link in the regional transportation network. However, Due to Budget constraints the project in 2019 to repair the station was deferred. With time, the station has deteriorated significantly, necessitating an exhaustive reconstruction effort.

After 6 years of suspension due to insufficient rolling stock, the station returned to operation with the reopening of the Naga–Ligao route on July 31, 2023. This service was extended all the way to the end of the line at Legazpi on December 27, 2023.

On 10 November 2025, trains serving the station were suspended after Typhoon Uwan caused significant damage to a bridge along the Naga-Legazpi route in Guinobatan, Albay, with the Department of Transport (DOTr) immediately issuing a directive to fast-track repairs. Despite an initial reopening date of February 2026, services remain suspended as of July 2026. An inspection of the bridge was carried out on July 13, 2026, and damaged sleepers were removed while PNR continues the procurement process for machinery and materials to carry out the repair.
