= Daraga station =

Intercity rail stop in Albay, Philippines

Daraga
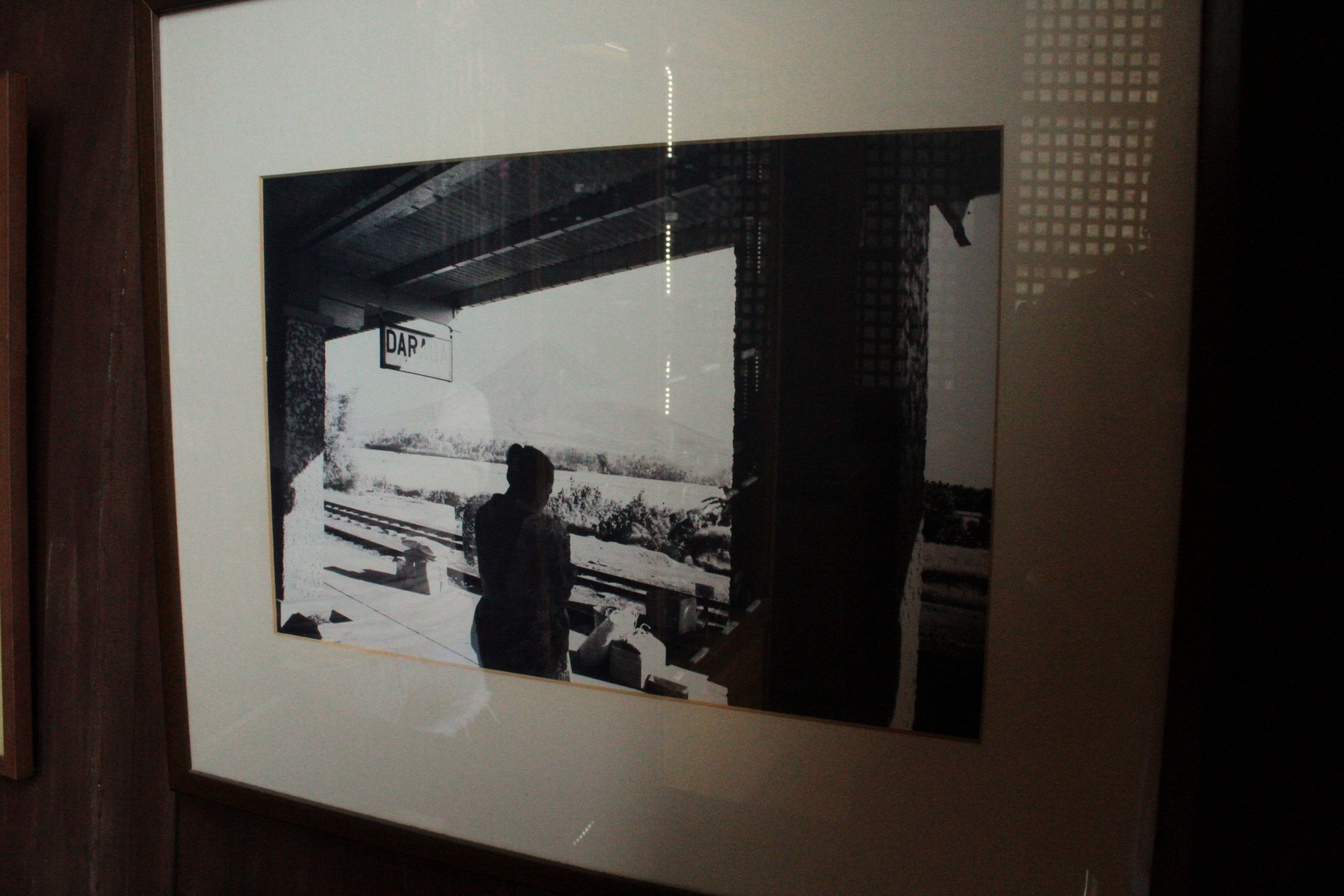
- Undated photo of Daraga Station

General information
- Location: Market Area, Daraga
- Coordinates: 13°9′2.78″N 123°42′57.52″E
- Owner: Philippine National Railways
- Operator: Philippine National Railways
- Line: South Main Line
- Platforms: Side platform
- Tracks: 1, plus 1 siding track

Construction
- Structure type: At grade
- Parking: Yes
- Accessible: Yes

Other information
- Station code: LEG

History
- Opened: November 1914
- Rebuilt: 2015

Services
Preceding station	PNR	Following station
Travesia towards Lupi Viejo	Bicol Commuter	Washington Drive towards Legazpi
Ligao towards Tutuban	Bicol Express	Legazpi Terminus
Location
- Location within Albay Location within Luzon Location within Philippines

Daraga station is a railway station located on the South Main Line in Albay, Philippines. It was last used for the Bicol Commuter service.

== History ==
Daraga was opened in November 1914 as part of the Legazpi Division Line from Tabaco, Albay to Iriga, Camarines Sur via Legazpi City. The station was expanded in 1938 for the completion of the Manila-Legazpi Line.

After years of neglect, repair works were done in 2014, when PNR was given Php1.7B for Manila-Bicol line rehabilitation. The station building was reconstructed and reopened on September 18, 2015 to serve the Bicol Commuter trains to and from Legazpi. Since then, the station has deteriorated and fallen to disrepair.

The PNR Daraga Station in Albay stands as a vital link in the regional transportation network. However, due to budget constraints the project to repair the station was deferred. With time, the station has deteriorated significantly, necessitating an exhaustive reconstruction effort.

The station returned to operation with the reopening of the Naga–Legazpi route on December 27, 2023.

On 10 November 2025, trains serving the station were suspended after Typhoon Uwan caused significant damage to a bridge along the Naga-Legazpi route in Guinobatan, Albay, with the Department of Transport (DOTr) immediately issuing a directive to fast-track repairs. Despite an initial reopening date of February 2026, services remain suspended as of July 2026. An inspection of the bridge was carried out on July 13, 2026, and damaged sleepers were removed while PNR continues the procurement process for machinery and materials to carry out the repair.
