= Baao station =

Request stop of the Philippine National Railways (PNR)

Baao

General information
- Location: Baao
- Coordinates: 13°27′23″N 123°22′05″E
- Owner: Philippine National Railways
- Operator: Philippine National Railways
- Line: Former: South Main Line
- Platforms: Stair
- Tracks: 1, plus 1 siding track

Construction
- Structure type: At grade
- Accessible: No

History
- Opened: April 1, 1920; 106 years ago

Services
Preceding station	PNR	Following station
Pili towards Lupi Viejo	Bicol Commuter	Iriga towards Legazpi
Location

Baao station is a former railway station and operating request stop located on the South Main Line in Baao, Camarines Sur, Philippines. It was last used for the Bicol Commuter service.

== History ==
Baao station was opened on April 1, 1920 by the Manila Railroad Company as part of the Legazpi Division from Tabaco, Albay to Naga, Camarines Sur. Passenger service to Manila only started on January 31, 1938 upon the completion of the South Main Line.

After many years of abandonment, services resumed on July 31, 2023 along the Bicol Commuter route Naga–Ligao. Further services to Legazpi resumed on December 23, 2023.

On 10 November 2025, trains serving the station were suspended after Typhoon Uwan caused significant damage to a bridge along the Naga-Legazpi route in Guinobatan, Albay, with the Department of Transport (DOTr) immediately issuing a directive to fast-track repairs. Despite an initial reopening date of February 2026, services remain suspended as of July 2026. An inspection of the bridge was carried out on July 13, 2026, and damaged sleepers were removed while PNR continues the procurement process for machinery and materials to carry out the repair.

== Services ==
During 2023-2025, the station was served by Bicol Commuter trains using INKA CC300 locomotives from Indonesia. There were 4 trips every day, and the station was a request stop. Without any structure and formal facilities at the station, boarding was done using stairs.
