= Naga station =

Railway station in Camarines Sur, Philippines

Naga
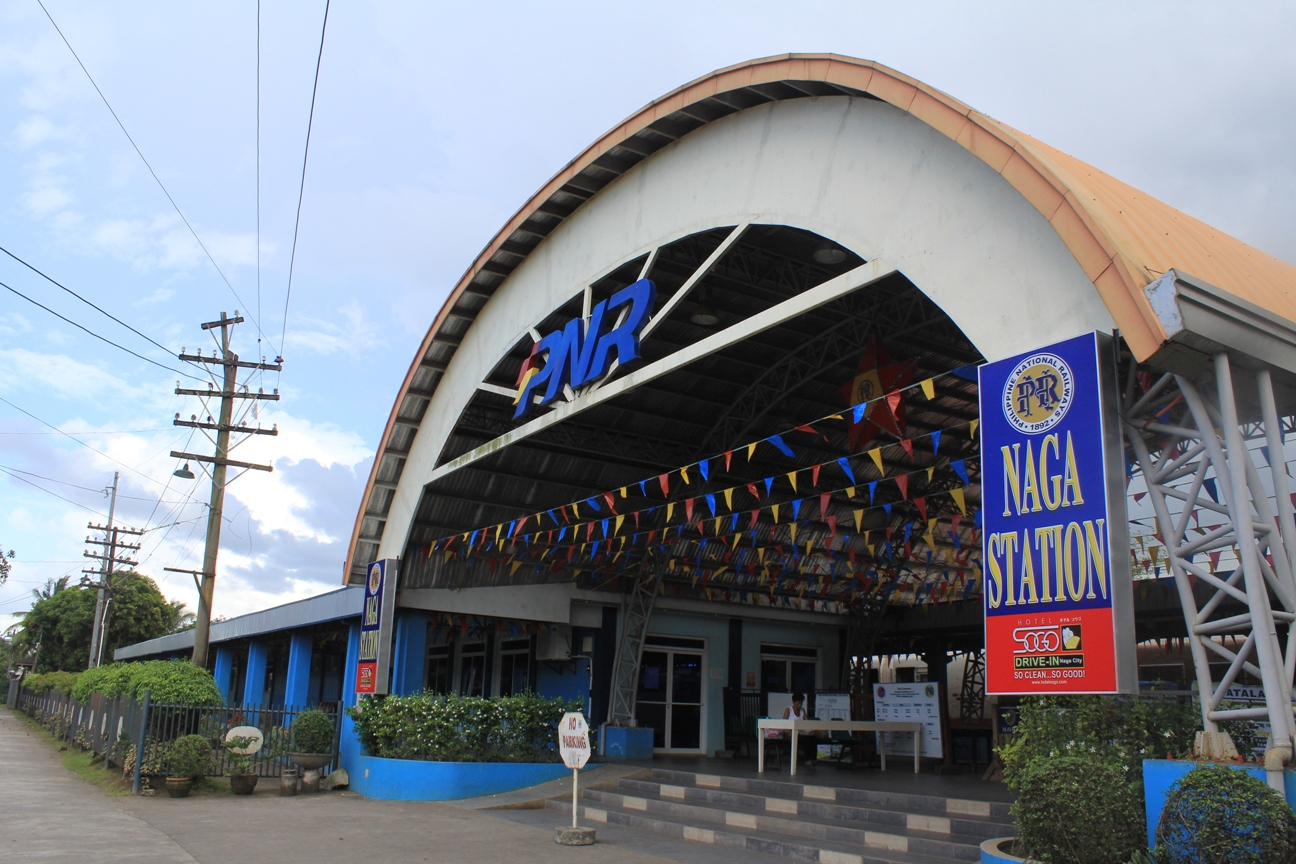
- Exterior of Naga City Station

General information
- Location: PNR Road, Tabuco
- Coordinates: 13°37′10.43″N 123°11′9.24″E
- Owner: Philippine National Railways
- Operator: Philippine National Railways
- Line: South Main Line
- Platforms: Side platform
- Tracks: 2, plus 2 siding track

Construction
- Structure type: At grade
- Accessible: Yes

Other information
- Station code: NG

History
- Opened: April 1, 1920
- Rebuilt: 2009

Passengers
- 1,000-2,500 per day

Services
Preceding station	PNR	Following station
Sampaloc towards Lupi Viejo	Bicol Commuter	Pili towards Legazpi
Pamplona towards Tutuban	Bicol Express	Iriga towards Legazpi
Pamplona towards Tutuban	Isarog Limited	Terminus
Location

Naga station is a railway station located on the South Main Line in Naga, Camarines Sur, Philippines. It is a major station on the line, currently serving as the main terminus for the Bicol Commuter, and was formerly used by the Bicol Express and Isarog Limited Express. The station is considered the largest of all Philippine National Railways (PNR) stations in Southern Luzon. It houses the regional offices of PNR that covers the total jurisdiction over Southern Luzon.

== History ==
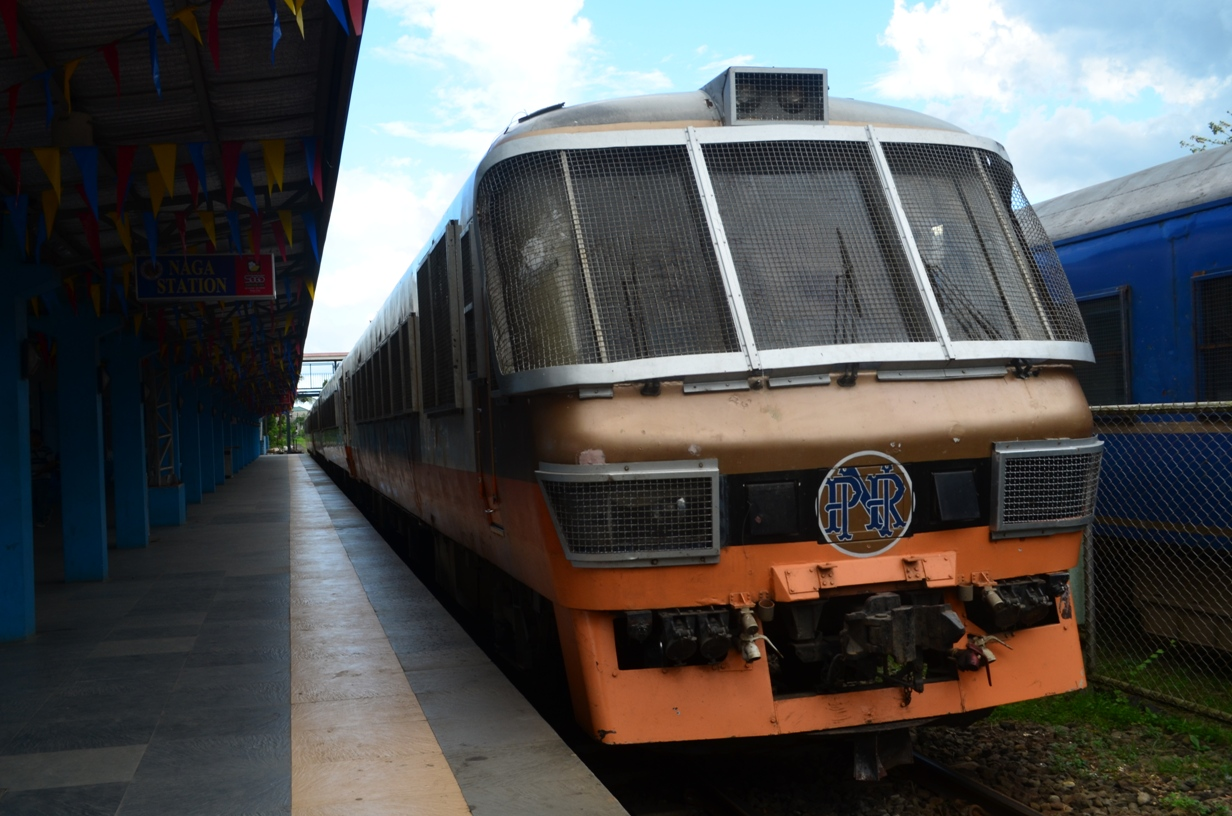
A Kiha 59 in the Naga station.

Naga was opened on April 1, 1920, as one of the stations along the Legazpi Division line of the Manila Railroad Company. By 1938, the Legazpi Division was merged into the Main Line South. During the PNR era, Naga became the terminus of the Peñafrancia Express that was inaugurated in 1981. The service ended in 2004. Meanwhile, the present building was rebuilt in the late 2000s and was opened in 2009 for the Isarog Limited. The Bicol Commuter, a commuter rail/local train service, was once again inaugurated in the mid-2010s. Naga is currently the southern terminus of the service.

In 2011, the administration of Pres.Benigno Aquino pushed for the resumption of the rehabilitation of the damaged Bicol section of the railways, which was eventually completed up to Ligao City, Albay a year after. The Manila-Ligao trips were restored in early December last year, raising optimism that rehabilitation works for the railway line down to here would be completed at once so that trains would be once more seen traversing its original route deep into the central point of Albay.The service became irregular by 2012 Due to Calamities until the line was once again closed in 2014 due to lack of Rolling Stock.

As of January 2014, only the existing PNR line between Naga and Sipocot in the Bicol region (35 km) remains operational. This transports approximately 1,300 passengers per day with an average load factor of 50% for the year 2014.

On July 17, 2023, the Philippine National Railways conducted a test run of PNR 9000 class from Naga Station to Ligao station as preparation of restarting the service between two provinces, Camarines Sur and Albay. The local train service between Naga and Ligao will be officially open on July 31, 2023, with having 2 trips everyday from 5:30 am from Ligao station and 5:30 pm (PST) from Naga. It will cater 9 stations including Naga, Pili, Baao, Iriga, Bato, Matacon, Polangui, Oas and Ligao using the PNR 9000 class with 3 coaches which expected cater 800 passengers.

As of August 2024 DMU PNR 8000 8002 is Serving the Naga to Sipocot Bicol Commuter Line with 6 trips per Day. INKA CC300 DHL 9002 and 3-car PC 8302 and DHL 9003 and PC 8303 used as a Bicol Commuter Train of the Naga - Legazpi line with 6 trips per day.

On 22 October 2024, Rains brought by Tropical Storm Trami (2024) (local name Kristine), registered as high as 578.9 mm in just one day. The PNR Naga railway depot was flooded affecting INKA DHL 9003, INKA DMU PNR 8000 class 8002, KiHa 52 Rescue train, KiHa 35, KiHa 59 series, DEL PNR 2500 class 2540 and PNR 5000 class 5009 but will be rehabilitated. INKA DHL 9002 was in Legazpi City and not affected by the flood and currently serves Naga City - Sipocot,

On February 6, 2025, the INKA DMU PNR 8000 class 8002 trainset has been rehabilitated and repaired, and was on trial run from Naga City - Sipocot, and brought back to Naga City - Sipocot line after a few days of trial run, the INKA DHL 9002 will be brought back to Naga - Legazpi line after the repairs of INKA DMU PNR 8000 class 8002 trainset.

On February 14, 2025, The INKA DHL 9002 started its Trial Run from Naga - Legazpi v.v in preparation for the return of the route/line on February 26, 2025.

On February 26, 2025, the Philippine National Railways Naga to Legazpi line is set to return after the rehabilitation of trainsets due to flooding on Naga station brought by Tropical Storm Trami (2024) (local name Kristine) last October 2024 but brought back only from 6 trips a day to 2 trips a day due to 1 remaining trainset with body number INKA DHL 9003, already rehabilitated but still awaiting a spare parts from Indonesia.

On June 24, 2025, The INKA DHL 9003 started its trial run from Naga to Iriga v.v and completed the trial run on June 30, 2025.

On July 1, 2025, The INKA DHL 9003 was back on the route/line and was used on Naga - Legazpi v.v, while INKA DHL 9002 was removed from the current route/line to check and maintain the train before bringing it back on Naga - Legazpi route soon.

After years of neglect PNR Naga station Last Repair works were done in 2014, when PNR was given Php1.7B for Manila-Bicol line rehab. Since then the station has deteriorated and fallen to disrepair. On 30 October 2024 PNR Naga Depot will now have an Engineering Staff House as Bidding for its construction was won by CerenoBuilders. Construction of Train Personnel Dormitory by Four R Construction was awarded in August 2024.

=== Future ===
A new Naga station will be built outside of the city center under the PNR South Long Haul project. This is to avoid congestion in the city, loosen its track curvature, and to allow for expansion of the station. The last includes additional station tracks, a freight depot and a light-duty maintenance facility.
