= Typhoon Fung-wong (2025) =

Pacific typhoon in 2025

Typhoon Fung-wong (Uwan)
- Fung-wong at peak intensity while approaching the Philippines on November 9

Meteorological history
- Formed: November 4, 2025
- Remnant low: November 12, 2025
- Dissipated: November 13, 2025

Very strong typhoon
- 10-minute sustained (JMA)
- Highest winds: 175 km/h (110 mph)
- Lowest pressure: 935 hPa (mbar); 27.61 inHg

Category 4-equivalent typhoon
- 1-minute sustained (SSHWS/JTWC)
- Highest winds: 230 km/h (145 mph)
- Lowest pressure: 933 hPa (mbar); 27.55 inHg

Overall effects
- Fatalities: 34
- Injuries: 147
- Missing: 2
- Damage: ≥$104 million (2025 USD)
- Areas affected: Philippines, China, Taiwan
- Part of the 2025 Pacific typhoon season

Typhoon Fung-wong, (Note: The name Fung-wong (Cantonese: 鳳凰, [fʊŋ˨ wɔːŋ˨˩]) was contributed by Hong Kong and means phoenix or refers to Lantau Peak in Cantonese.) known in the Philippines as Super Typhoon Uwan, (Note: PAGASA officially classified Fung-wong as a super typhoon, which is reserved for tropical cyclones with maximum sustained winds exceeding 185 km/h (115 mph); however, tropical cyclones with maximum 1-minute sustained winds exceeding 240 km/h (150 mph) are classified as a super typhoon by the JTWC.) was a powerful, large, and destructive tropical cyclone that struck the Philippines and Taiwan in early November 2025. The twenty-sixth named storm and twelfth typhoon of the 2025 Pacific typhoon season, Fung-wong originated from a broad low-pressure area northeast of Chuuk on November 3. It gradually organized over the following days before undergoing rapid intensification on November 8 under increasingly favorable atmospheric conditions.

The Japan Meteorological Agency (JMA) classified the system as a typhoon on November 7, and early the next day, the Philippine Atmospheric, Geophysical and Astronomical Services Administration (PAGASA) upgraded it to a super typhoon. Shortly after, the Joint Typhoon Warning Center (JTWC) assessed Fung-wong as a Category 4-equivalent typhoon. Shortly before making landfall in Dinalungan, Aurora, on the evening of November 9. After crossing Luzon, it weakened and re-emerged over the West Philippine Sea before recurving towards Taiwan, where it made landfall in Hengchun Township, Pingtung County, as a tropical storm on November 12. Fung-wong then weakened further before dissipating on November 13. It was the first storm to make landfall in Taiwan in November since Typhoon Gilda in 1967, and the second storm to strike Taiwan's western plains in 2025 since Typhoon Danas in July.

Fung-wong made landfall in the Philippines just five days after the deadly Typhoon Kalmaegi had battered central parts of the country, exacerbating recovery efforts. The storm brought widespread flooding and intense winds along its path, particularly across the Bicol Region and Northern Luzon. In total, it caused at least 33 deaths and 52 injuries in the Philippines, mostly from floods and landslides, while one death and 95 injuries were reported in Taiwan. Owing to the significant damages and loss of life it caused, PAGASA later retired the name Uwan from the rotating naming lists and was replaced with Urbano for the 2029 season. In March 2026, the name Fung-wong was also retired from the rotating naming lists by the ESCAP/WMO Typhoon Committee, with a replacement name to be announced in 2027.

== Meteorological history ==
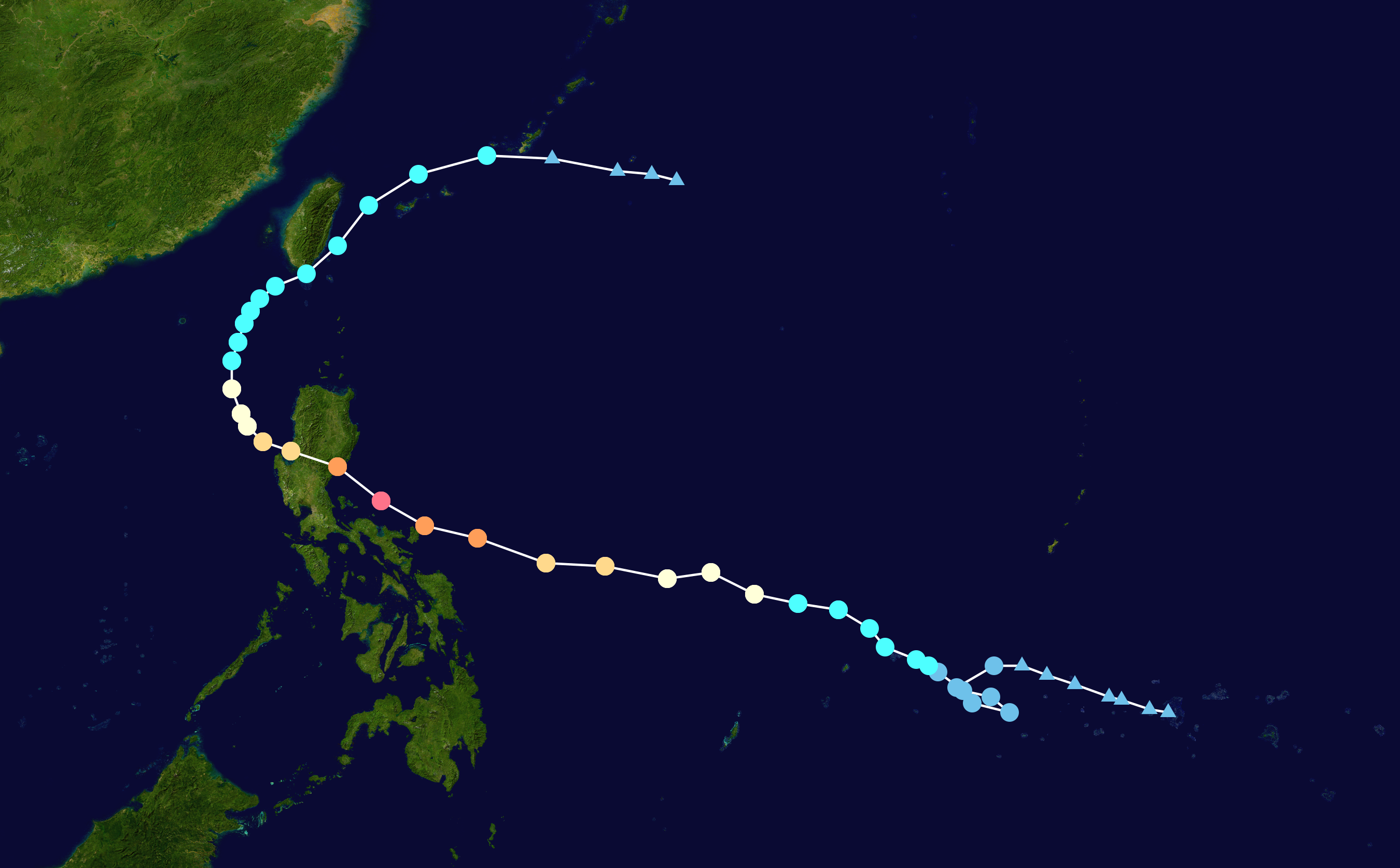
Map plotting the storm's track and intensity, according to the Saffir–Simpson scale Map key Saffir–Simpson scale Tropical depression (≤38 mph, ≤62 km/h) Tropical storm (39–73 mph, 63–118 km/h) Category 1 (74–95 mph, 119–153 km/h) Category 2 (96–110 mph, 154–177 km/h) Category 3 (111–129 mph, 178–208 km/h) Category 4 (130–156 mph, 209–251 km/h) Category 5 (≥157 mph, ≥252 km/h) Unknown Storm type Tropical cyclone Subtropical cyclone Extratropical cyclone, remnant low, tropical disturbance, or monsoon depression

On November 3, the JTWC began monitoring an area of convection that had developed approximately 300 nautical miles (560 km) northeast of Chuuk. Satellite imagery revealed a consolidating low-level circulation center (LLCC) with displaced cells of convection concentrated mainly on its eastern quadrant. The disturbance was located in a generally favorable environment characterized by weak vertical wind shear of 5–10 knots (9.3–18.5 km/h; 5.8–11.5 mph), moderate equatorward outflow, and warm sea surface temperatures of 29–30 °C (84–86 °F). At 18:00 UTC, the JMA classified the system as a tropical depression, citing obscure deep convection but noting favorable environmental conditions. Around 19:30 UTC, the JTWC issued a Tropical Cyclone Formation Alert after observing persistent convection along the LLCC. The next day at 09:00 UTC, the agency issued its first advisory on the system, designating it as Tropical Depression 32W as convection became more organized around the center. Convective banding subsequently began obscuring the LLCC as the system's circulation remained somewhat disorganized with flaring convection.

Throughout November 5, the depression maintained its intensity while drifting eastward, steered by a subtropical ridge to the north. Satellite imagery noted a broad and partially exposed LLCC as the system remained expansive in size. The JMA noted that the system's structure had limited firmness, causing it to maintain its intensity. The JTWC, meanwhile, found the system attempting to gain organization. At 18:00 UTC, the system had become better organized, and the JMA upgraded it to tropical storm status, naming it Fung-wong as it began tracking west-northwestward. At 03:00 UTC on November 6, the JTWC also upgraded the system to a tropical storm, citing deepening convection and steady consolidation. The JMA eventually upgraded Fung-wong to a severe tropical storm due to a favorable environment as it moved west along the southern periphery of a subtropical high. Convective banding wrapped around the center more tightly as the circulation showed signs of consolidation.

The next day, the JTWC reported that deep convective bands had wrapped tightly around the circulation, obscuring the LLCC. At 17:00 PHT (09:00 UTC), PAGASA assigned Fung-wong the local name Uwan – meaning "rain" in the Cebuano language, and the replacement for Urduja after its retirement in 2017 – even though the system remained outside the Philippine Area of Responsibility (PAR) as outer rainbands had already begun affecting parts of the country. This marked the second instance on record, after Tropical Depression Romina—which subsequently became Tropical Storm Pabuk—in 2024, in which PAGASA issued a local name before a system entered the PAR. At 15:00 UTC, the JTWC upgraded the system to a typhoon, citing an increasingly favorable environment, with the JMA following suit three hours later. Later that same day, however, the JTWC reported that Fung-wong's structure had become disorganized, noting fragmented upper-level banding. By November 8, increasing wind shear of 25–30 knots (46–56 km/h; 29–35 mph) and cooler sea surface temperatures temporarily slowed further intensification. Nevertheless, strong radial outflow persisted, and deep convection continued wrapping around the center. During the early hours of November 9, the system began strengthening again, prompting the JMA to upgrade it to a very strong typhoon. Satellite imagery showed a cloud-filled, slightly asymmetric eye as the typhoon contended with easterly shear, though continued outflow allowed it to strengthen further while tracking east of Manila.

High-resolution imagery of Typhoon Fung-wong nearing Luzon prior to its landfall in Dinalungan, Aurora.

At 08:00 PHT (00:00 UTC), PAGASA reported that Fung-wong had rapidly intensified into a super typhoon, estimating sustained winds of 185 km/h (115 mph) with gusts reaching 230 km/h (145 mph), along with an expansive diameter of about 1,800 km (1,100 miles). By 09:00 UTC, the JTWC assessed the storm's one-minute sustained winds at 215 km/h (135 mph). At approximately 21:10 PHT (13:10 UTC), Fung-wong made landfall in Dinalungan, Aurora, as a super typhoon. The storm weakened significantly while traversing north-central Luzon before emerging over the coastal waters of La Union by 05:00 PHT on November 10 (21:00 UTC on November 9), with its convective structure already deteriorating. After entering the South China Sea, Fung-wong began curving northwestward along the southern periphery of a subtropical ridge.

By 03:00 UTC on November 10, the JMA downgraded the typhoon to a severe tropical storm as continued land interaction weakened the system. As deep convection pulsed along the western side of the circulation, the JMA assessed the system's structure as lacking coherence. At the same time, the JTWC noted that Fung-wong's forward motion had slowed markedly. At 05:00 PHT on November 11 (21:00 UTC on the previous day), the system exited the PAR while maintaining its prevailing intensity. The JTWC reported that Fung-wong then began accelerating as it rounded a steering ridge to the northeast, though it continued to struggle with reorganization. Subsequent analysis highlighted a pronounced vertical tilt and a ragged appearance, along with increasingly unfavorable conditions including elevated wind shear and falling sea surface temperatures. The JTWC subsequently downgraded Fung-wong to a tropical storm at 09:00 UTC. Satellite imagery later indicated a fully exposed LLCC and a poorly defined eye, with convection having dissipated entirely. The JMA downgraded the system to a tropical storm at 00:00 UTC on November 12. At 17:00 PHT (09:00 UTC), the system re-entered the PAR, with PAGASA again classifying it as a tropical storm. At 19:40 TST (11:40 UTC), Fung-wong made landfall in Hengchun Township in Pingtung County, Taiwan as a tropical storm. Continuing northeastward, PAGASA downgraded the system to a tropical depression at 23:00 PHT (15:00 UTC). At 00:00 UTC on November 13, the JMA further downgraded the system to a developing low. At 11:00 PHT (03:00 UTC), PAGASA reported that Fung-wong had downgraded into a low-pressure area. At 15:00 UTC, the JTWC issued its final warning while downgrading the system to a tropical depression.

== Preparations ==
=== Philippines ===
==== Highest Tropical Cyclone Wind Signal ====
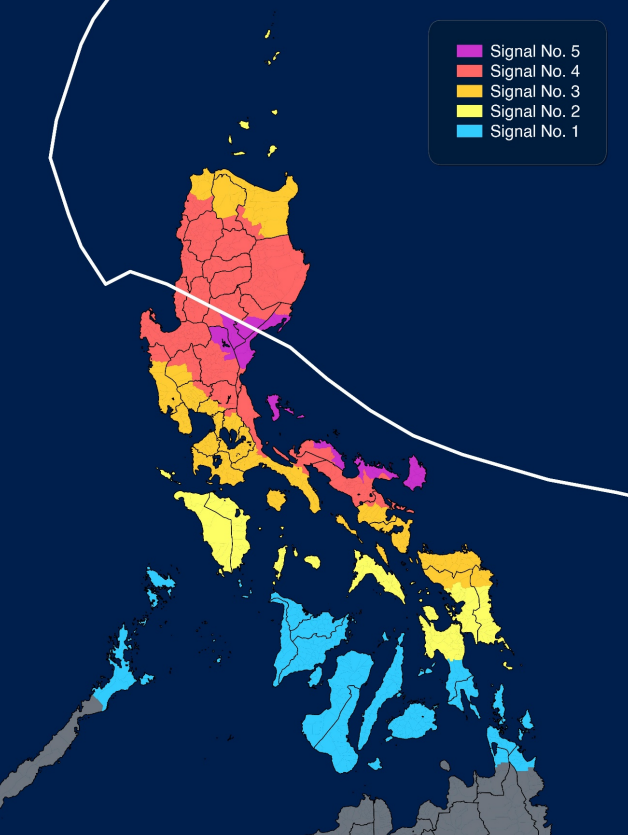
Highest Tropical Cyclone Wind Signal issued by PAGASA for Fung-wong (Uwan) in each province. The white line represents the best track.

TCWS#	Luzon	Visayas	Mindanao
5	Southern Portion of Nueva Vizcaya, Southern Portion of Quirino, Central Portion of Aurora, Northeastern Portion of Nueva Ecija, Polillo Islands, Calaguas Islands, Catanduanes, Northern and Eastern Portions of Camarines Norte, Northern Portion of Camarines Sur	None	None
4	Ilocos Sur, Southern Portion of Ilocos Norte, La Union, Pangasinan, Isabela, Southwestern Portion of Cagayan, Rest of Nueva Vizcaya, Rest of Quirino, Eastern and Central Portions of Bulacan, Eastern Portion of Pampanga, Northeastern Portion of Tarlac, Northern Portion of Zambales, Rest of Aurora, Abra, Benguet, Ifugao, Kalinga, Mountain Province, Southern Portion of Apayao, Northern Portion of Rizal, Northern and Eastern Portion of Quezon, Rest of Camarines Norte, Rest of Camarines Sur, Northern Portion of Albay	None	None
3	Rest of Ilocos Norte, Rest of Cagayan, Bataan, Rest of Bulacan, Rest of Pampanga, Rest of Tarlac, Rest of Zambales, Rest of Apayao, Metro Manila, Batangas, Cavite, Laguna, Marinduque, Rest of Quezon, Burias Island, Rest of Albay, Sorsogon	Northern Samar, Northern Portion of Eastern Samar, Northern Portion of Samar	None
2	Babuyan Islands, Batanes, Lubang Islands, Occidental Mindoro, Oriential Mindoro, Romblon, Masbate	Biliran, Rest of Eastern Samar, Rest of Samar, Northern and Central Portions of Leyte	None
1	Cagayancillo Islands, Calamian Islands, Cuyo Islands, Northern Portion of Palawan	Aklan, Antique, Capiz, Guimaras, Iloilo, Negros Occidental, Negros Oriental, Bantayan Islands, Caluya Islands, Camotes Islands, Cebu, Rest of Leyte, Siquijor, Southern Leyte	Bucas Grande Islands, Dinagat Islands, Northern Portion of Agusan del Norte, Northern Portion of Surigao del Sur, Surigao del Norte

PAGASA started tracking Fung-wong on November 4 as they began issuing tropical cyclone advisories on the then-tropical depression located to the east of the Philippine Area of Responsibility (PAR). As early as this advisory, forecasts already indicated that Fung-wong would develop further into a super typhoon (in PAGASA's scale) before making landfall over Northern Luzon. Warning of the storm's wide circulation (around 700 kilometers or 430 miles), PAGASA called on residents to begin preparations as early as November 7, three days before its predicted landfall. Numerous areas were issued TCWS Signal No. 1 at 17:00 PHT (09:00 UTC) on November 7. Twelve hours later, Catanduanes, the northern and central portions of Northern Samar, the northeastern portion of Samar, and the northern portion of Eastern Samar were placed in Signal No. 2. At 17:00 PHT (09:00 UTC) on November 8, Catanduanes, the eastern portion of Camarines Sur, the eastern portion of Albay, the northeastern portion of Sorsogon, and the northeastern portion of Northern Samar were placed in Signal No. 3. Six hours later, Catanduanes was placed in Signal No. 4. As more areas were placed in Signal No. 4, Signal No. 5 was issued for the Polillo Islands, the northern portion of Camarines Norte, and the eastern portion of Camarines Sur. As the typhoon traversed Luzon, more areas were placed in Signal No. 5, including parts of Aurora, Nueva Ecija, Nueva Vizcaya and Quirino. Eventually, at 02:00 PHT (18:00 UTC the previous day) on November 10, all Signal No. 5 alerts were removed. By 11:00 PHT (03:00 UTC), all Signal No. 4 alerts were removed; all Signal No. 3 alerts were also removed six hours later.

Fung-wong immediately followed the passing of another typhoon in the Philippines just one week prior, Typhoon Kalmaegi. Following damage in the Visayas region as a result of Kalmaegi and with forecasts predicting super typhoon (>185 km/h or 115 mph) intensity with the emergence of Fung-wong, the entire country was placed under a national state of calamity on November 6. Rescue operations for victims of Kalmaegi were suspended beginning November 8. The Office of Civil Defense (OCD) estimated that 30.8 million people could be exposed to the effects of the storm. Preparations for Fung-wong started while disaster response from Kalmaegi was still ongoing. The Department of the Interior and Local Government (DILG) immediately called for local governments to start preparations, as the Philippine National Police began to activate disaster response plans and prepare response teams. Both agencies implemented forced evacuations in high-risk areas. The Armed Forces of the Philippines suspended its DAGIT-PA field exercises involving its Northern Luzon and Western Commands and deployed personnel to assist in disaster response. The Department of Health went on heightened alert as health supplies containing a number of essential medicines were prepositioned in various regions of Luzon.

By November 8, disaster alertness was on its highest ("red alert") levels for the entire regions of Metro Manila, Cagayan Valley, and Calabarzon along with the provinces of Aurora and Northern Samar. By the end of the day, the National Disaster Risk Reduction and Management Council raised the red alert over the entire country. The Philippine Institute of Volcanology and Seismology released a lahar flow advisory over the Bicol Region, anticipating torrential rain causing life-threatening lahar to flow down the channels of the Mayon Volcano. As volunteer radio and civic communication groups were expected to assist in disaster response and relief, the National Telecommunications Commission mobilized its regional offices, which have prepared equipment, facilities, and backup systems. The Department of Social Welfare and Development prepared 2,040,000 family food packs as well as 91,101 ready-to-eat food packs and 314,000 non-food items. The DILG barred local officials from travelling abroad from November 9 to 15. It also urged 17,000 barangays nationwide to launch preemptive evacuations due to the risk of flooding and landslides starting November 8.

By November 9, more than 1,100,000 people across Luzon and Visayas had been preemptively evacuated. Approximately 6,607 passengers, crew, and cargo staff in 86 ports nationwide had also become stranded as sea travel was suspended by the Philippine Coast Guard (PCG). The PCG was also placed on full alert in preparation for the typhoon. Classes at all levels were suspended on November 10 and 11 across all regions of Luzon (Regions I, II, III, IV-A, IV-B, V, NCR, and CAR) and Visayas (Regions VI, VII, VIII, and NIR). Government work was also suspended in all of Luzon and in Eastern Visayas (VIII). The number coding scheme in Metro Manila was also suspended for November 10.

As early as November 7, various sea trips and flights had already been cancelled. Malls across Luzon announced the waiving of overnight parking fees over the weekend in preparation for the typhoon, including all Luzon-based SM, Robinsons, Megaworld, and CityMall outlets, as well as some Ayala, WalterMart, and Vista malls. The Archdiocese of Manila called on schools, churches, and institutions to provide temporary shelter to homeless people. The Philippine Basketball Association postponed games featuring the TNT Tropang 5G, the Magnolia Hotshots, Barangay Ginebra San Miguel, and the Titan Ultra Giant Risers. The University Athletic Association of the Philippines and the National Collegiate Athletic Association delayed all scheduled sports on November 9 and 11. AirSWIFT, Cebu Pacific, Cebgo, Philippines AirAsia, Philippine Airlines, and numerous other international airlines cancelled flights to and from Ninoy Aquino International Airport on November 9 and 10. At least 325 domestic and 61 international flights were cancelled. The Pasig River Ferry also suspended operations. Storm surge warnings were issued in 41 provinces and Metro Manila, with authorities warning of waves reaching more than 3 m (9.8 ft). Five dams in Luzon opened their floodgates as a precaution. In Ilocos Norte, dredging works were preemptively carried out along the Padsan River in Laoag as a precaution against flooding, while 109 sea turtle eggs were evacuated from a beach in Bacarra to a conservation center in Currimao due to risks of a storm surge. In Aglipay, Quirino, three families sought shelter in a cave. In Echague, Isabela, two people were arrested for violating a liquor ban imposed ahead of the storm.

=== Taiwan ===
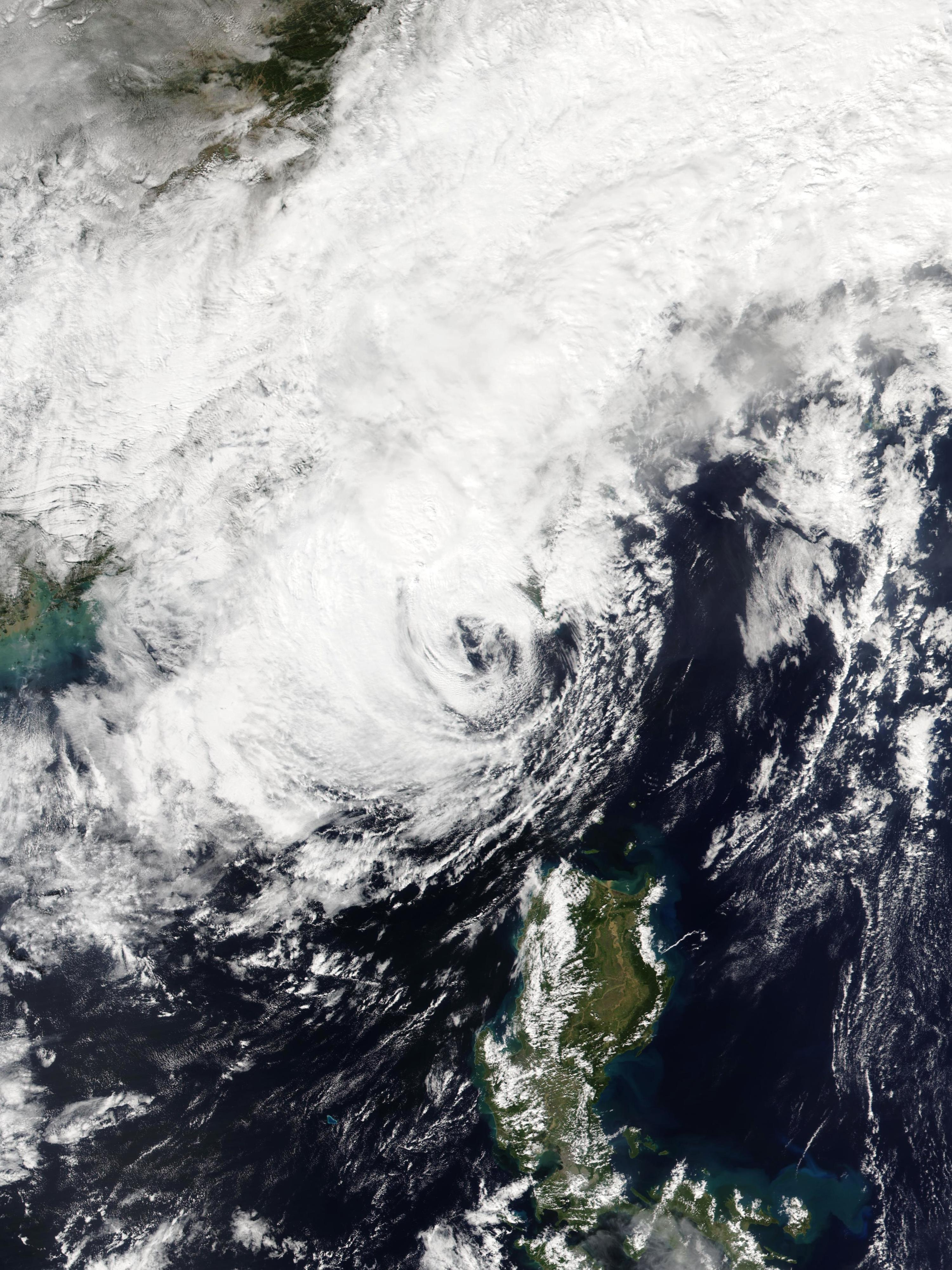
Tropical Storm Fung-wong approaching Taiwan on November 12

On November 10, the Central Weather Administration issued a sea warning for Fung-wong, with waves of up to 6 m (20 ft) forecast in southern and southeastern Taiwan, the Hengchun Peninsula, and Penghu. Meteorologists warned of more than 350 mm (14 in) of torrential rain, while authorities said nearly 5,000 people were to be evacuated in three townships of Hualien County. On November 11, the CWA issued a land warning for the storm, covering Kaohsiung, Pingtung County, and the Hengchun Peninsula. It also issued an "extreme torrential rain" advisory for Yilan County. Schools and offices in Taoyuan, Yilan, Hualien and Penghu, as well as in parts of New Taipei were ordered closed beginning that same day. Services on the Pingxi, Shen'ao and the South Link lines were suspended, while a section of Provincial Highway 9 between Guangfu and Fenglin townships in Hualien and the Southern Cross-Island Highway between Xiangyang and Lidao in Haiduan Township of Taitung County was closed. Twenty-two shelters were opened in New Taipei, Kaohsiung, and Hualien. All scheduled domestic flights in Taiwan were cancelled beginning on November 12.

=== Hong Kong ===
On November 9, the Hong Kong Observatory stated that it would issue the Standby Signal No. 1 in the afternoon the following day as the typhoon would enter within 800 km (500 mi) of Hong Kong. On the next day, the HKO issued the Standby Signal No. 1 at 12:20 HKT (04:20 UTC) and cancelled all Tropical Cyclone Warning Signals at 21:40 HKT (13:40 UTC). Before issuing the Strong Monsoon Signal‌ at 21:41 HKT (13:41 UTC) and cancelling it at 11:40 HKT (03:40 HKT) the next day.

=== Macau ===
On November 9, the Meteorological and Geophysical Bureau stated that it would issue Signal No. 1 once the typhoon enters within 800 km (500 mi) of Macau. The next day, the SMG issued Signal No. 1 at 14:00 MST (06:00 UTC) and cancelled all Tropical Cyclone Warning Signals at 21:00 MST (13:00 UTC).

=== China ===
Authorities activated an emergency typhoon response protocol for Fujian, Guangdong, Zhejiang and Hainan provinces.

== Impact ==
=== Philippines ===
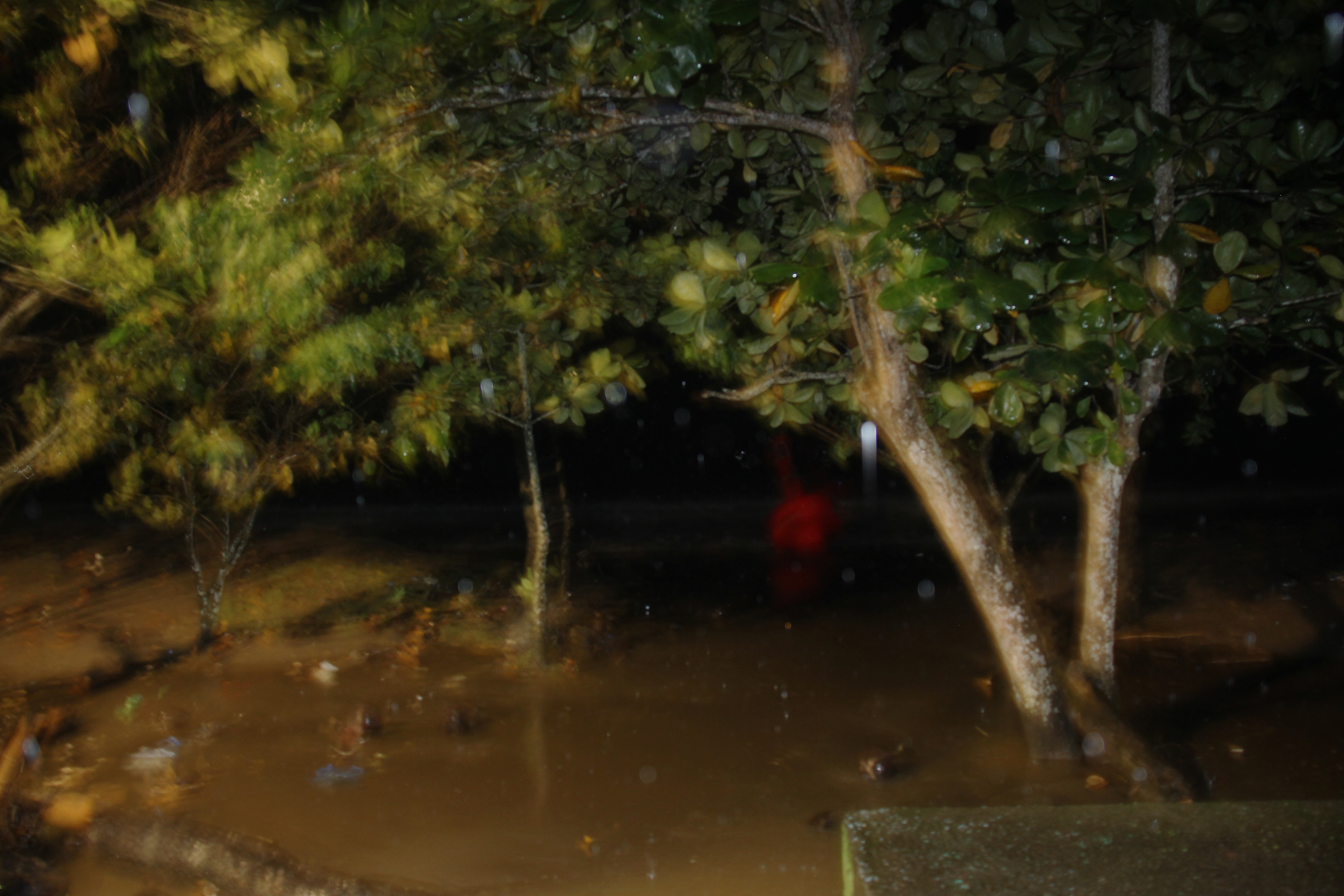
Fung-wong along with high tides causing flooding in Baybay Boulevard, Borongan, Eastern Samar

On the morning of November 10, immediately after Fung-wong's landfall, 149 areas in various parts of Central Luzon had begun flooding. 1,315,739 people from 13 regions were preemptively evacuated, with 482,614 displaced from their homes, 395,826 of which were staying inside government evacuation centers. Power outages were reported in 170 municipalities, water supply was disrupted in 15, and communication lines were cut in 14—all within the Bicol Region. An estimated ₱4.75 million (US$96,393.12) worth of assistance was provided to affected families. Over 894 search, rescue, and retrieval teams were deployed, with another 3,497 on standby. At least 312 schools were heavily damaged, along with 26 police facilities. Four vessels ran aground in separate incidents in Antique, Batangas and Palawan. A landing craft tank rammed into a seawall in the Caubian Islands. At least 4,100 houses were damaged, while 105 roads and 46 bridges were rendered impassable. Around 17 million people lost access to electricity, with the Department of Energy warning that repairs on energy infrastructure could take a month. Total damage in the Philippines was recorded at ₱4.92 billion (US$99.89 million), including ₱2 billion (US$40.62 million) in agricultural damage and ₱2.68 billion (US$54.43 million) in infrastructure damage, while the NDRRMC said at least 7.5 million people were affected.

Satellite imagery of power outages in some areas in the country after the onslaught of Fung-wong.

Fung-wong left at least 33 people dead and 52 others injured in the Philippines. One person drowned in Catanduanes while another was killed after being trapped under debris in Catbalogan. Three people were killed by landslides in Nueva Vizcaya, including two children in Kayapa, while four others were injured. Sixteen people were killed while eight others were injured and two reported missing in landslides across the Cordillera Administrative Region. Two injuries were recorded in Catanduanes and Calinog, Iloilo. Two people were injured in Quezon City by an electronic billboard that was toppled by strong winds. Power outages disrupted operations of the MRT Line 3. Flooding occurred in parts of Bicol, while storm surges reaching up to 4 m (13 ft) were observed in Catanduanes and Albay. Lahar flows also occurred in Albay. In Camarines Sur, a section of the Calabanga–Tinambac Road was blocked due to falling debris. The Tinambac–Tamban Road and the Tinambac–Goa Road were also closed. A rail bridge was damaged in Guinobatan, Albay, forcing the Philippine National Railways to suspend its Naga–Legazpi route. In Virac, Catanduanes, up to 392.4 mm (15.45 in) of rain was recorded from November 8 to 9, approaching the monthly average, while in Legazpi, Albay, 266 mm (10.5 in) of rain was recorded in the same period. In Daet, 215 mm (8.5 in) of rain was recorded. Virac Airport and the Virac seaport sustained heavy damage.

Water levels at Laguna de Bay reached 12.7 m (42 ft), exceeding its critical level of 12.5 m (41 ft). In Aurora, a section of the Baler–Casiguran Highway was closed in Dipaculao after large waves breached the road. One person was injured in the province after falling from a roof. Four towns were isolated, while a seawall collapsed in Baler following a storm surge. The province was subsequently placed under a state of calamity, along with the provinces of Albay, Camarines Sur, Eastern Samar, Northern Samar, Nueva Vizcaya and Pangasinan. A landslide in Naga, Cebu injured six people and damaged nine houses. Flooding also occurred in Zamboanga City, displacing around 4,047 residents. A seawall partially collapsed in Navotas, causing waist-deep flooding. A pumping station was damaged in Paco, Manila after water levels at the Pasig River reached 12 m (39 ft). A flash flood in Apayao caused the Chico River to overflow, causing extensive flooding downstream in Cagayan. Water levels at the Cagayan River under the Buntun Bridge in Tuguegarao reached 9.9 m (32 ft), exceeding its critical level of 9 m (30 ft). The bridge was subsequently closed to traffic after water levels reached 12 m (39 ft), marking the first time it closed due to a tropical cyclone. The Pampanga government reported the flooding of 73 villages throughout the province; the towns of Masantol and Macabebe experienced 1 to 3 feet (0.30 to 0.91 metres) of flooding. A dike partially collapsed in Obando, Bulacan. Large waves damaged two structures in Iloilo City, while several houses were struck by falling trees in Butuan. In Hinunangan, Southern Leyte, agricultural and infrastructure damage was estimated at ₱150 million (US$3.05 million).

=== Taiwan ===
Fung-wong left at least 95 people injured in Taiwan, while more than 8,500 others were evacuated. In addition, an elderly woman drowned in her flooded home in Suao Township, Yilan County. In Hualien County, the Matai'an Creek overflowed, inundating the village of Mingli. This was further exacerbated by a barrier lake that overflowed on November 13. Parts of Yilan County received up to 783.5 mm (30.85 in) of rain, resulting in 60 cm (24 in) of flooding in parts of the county. In Dongshan Township, sections of the embankment along Ankeng Creek were severely damaged. Total agricultural and infrastructural damage amounted to NT$139.53 million (US$4.45 million).

== Retirement ==
Due to the number of deaths and the extensive damage it caused in the Philippines, the ESCAP/WMO Typhoon Committee retired the name Fung-wong, along with seven others, from the rotating storm name lists during its 58th Session. Its replacement name will be announced in 2027.

On March 19, 2026, PAGASA retired the name Uwan from its rotating naming lists after it caused over ₱1 billion in damage and loss of life it caused, despite its first usage; and will never be used again as a typhoon name within the PAR. It was replaced with Urbano (Note: Initially, the name Upang will serve as a replacement name for Uwan, however, the agency later changed it to Urbano, as Upang had already been used as a replacement for Ulysses following its retirement after the 2020 season.) - a papal regnal name - for the 2029 season.

== See also ==
- Weather of 2025
- Tropical cyclones in 2025
- List of Philippine typhoons
  - List of Philippine typhoons (2000–present)
  - Typhoon Babs (Loleng; 1998) – a deadlier and slightly more powerful Category 4 typhoon that caused similar impacts to the same areas affected by Fung-wong
  - Typhoon Nanmadol (Yoyong; 2004) – another Category 4 typhoon which had a similar track with Fung-wong
  - Typhoon Utor (Labuyo; 2013) – a much stronger Category 4 typhoon which also devastated the same areas affected by Fung-wong
  - Typhoon Koppu (Lando; 2015) – another Category 4 typhoon which made landfall at a similar intensity
  - Typhoon Sarika (Karen; 2016) – a much powerful Category 3 typhoon which impacts and had a similar track with Fung-wong
  - Typhoon Man-yi (Pepito; 2024) – another Category 5 typhoon that also took a comparable trajectory to Fung-wong.

=== Other tropical cyclones that caused affected in Bicol Region ===
- Typhoon Durian (Reming; 2006)
- Typhoon Nock-ten (Nina; 2016)
- Typhoon Kammuri (Tisoy; 2019)
- Typhoon Goni (Rolly; 2020)
