= Legazpi station =

Railway station in Albay, Philippines

Legazpi
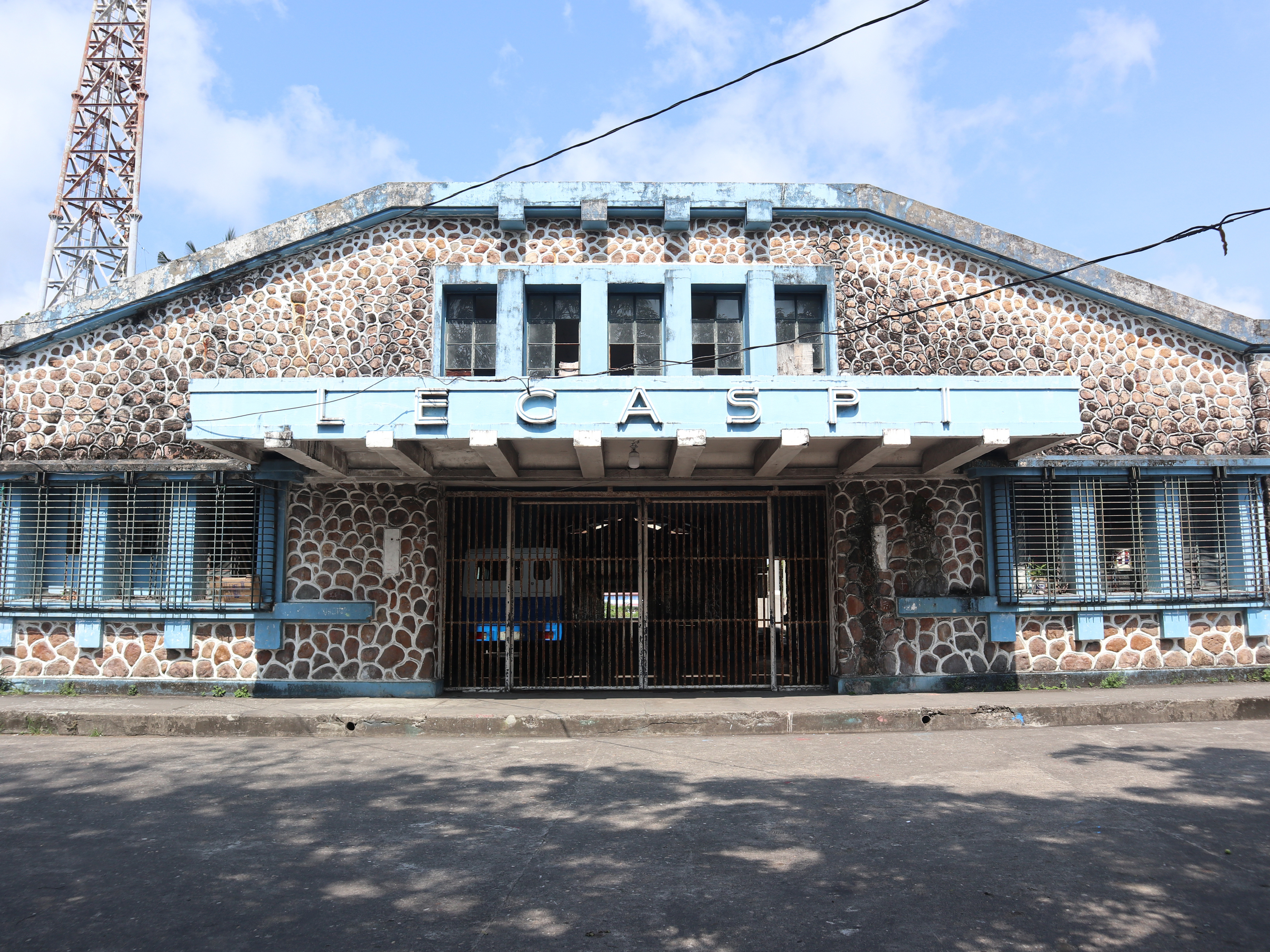
- Façade of Legazpi station

General information
- Location: Peñaranda Street, Legazpi, Albay, Philippines
- Coordinates: 13°9′5.54″N 123°45′7.31″E
- Owner: Philippine National Railways
- Lines: South Main Line; Former: Tabaco
- Platforms: Side platform
- Tracks: 1, plus 1 siding track

Construction
- Structure type: At grade
- Accessible: Yes

Other information
- Station code: LG

History
- Opened: November 1914
- Rebuilt: 2015

Services
Preceding station	PNR	Following station
Capantawan towards Lupi Viejo	Bicol Commuter	Terminus
Daraga towards Tutuban	Bicol Express	Terminus
Location
- Location within Albay Location within Luzon Location within Philippines

Legazpi station (Filipino: Legaspi) is the current railway terminus of the South Main Line located in Albay, Philippines. It was also the terminus for the Legaspi-Tabaco branch line. The station was last used for the Bicol Commuter service.

The PNR line to Legazpi City runs a total of 478 km from Manila, including the 56 km segment used for the Commuter Line to Calamba. From Calamba to Legazpi, the line is single-tracked and, similar to the Commuter Line, is narrow gauge (1,067 mm).Overall, the condition of the existing PNR line from Calamba to Legazpi is in fair condition largely on account of good construction, relatively light axle loads and very little accumulated traffic. Most rail defects and damage is due to poor maintenance of joints. Bridges are in widely varying states largely due to lack of maintenance, old age and inadequate protection from natural elements.

There are 397 observed road crossings between Alabang and Legazpi. Of these, 214 are authorized and 183 are unauthorized. Only 31 of the authorized crossings are officially staffed by PNR and none of the unauthorized crossings are staffed. Unauthorized crossings are ones that have been established without the formal consent of PNR and are often in areas of high encroachment.

The existing PNR line from Calamba to Legazpi is conventional ballasted track, where parallel steel rails are laid upon sleepers embedded in ballast (except on open deck bridges). Embankment is either on fill or at grade. Rails weigh 37 kg/m and are laid on sleepers of both wood and concrete. From Calamba to Legazpi, most stations and flag stops have been used for non-railway purposes such as residences, storage areas or as public gathering areas. Most of these stations south of Calamba are in conditions insufficient for efficient and safe operations as a railway passenger station.

== History ==
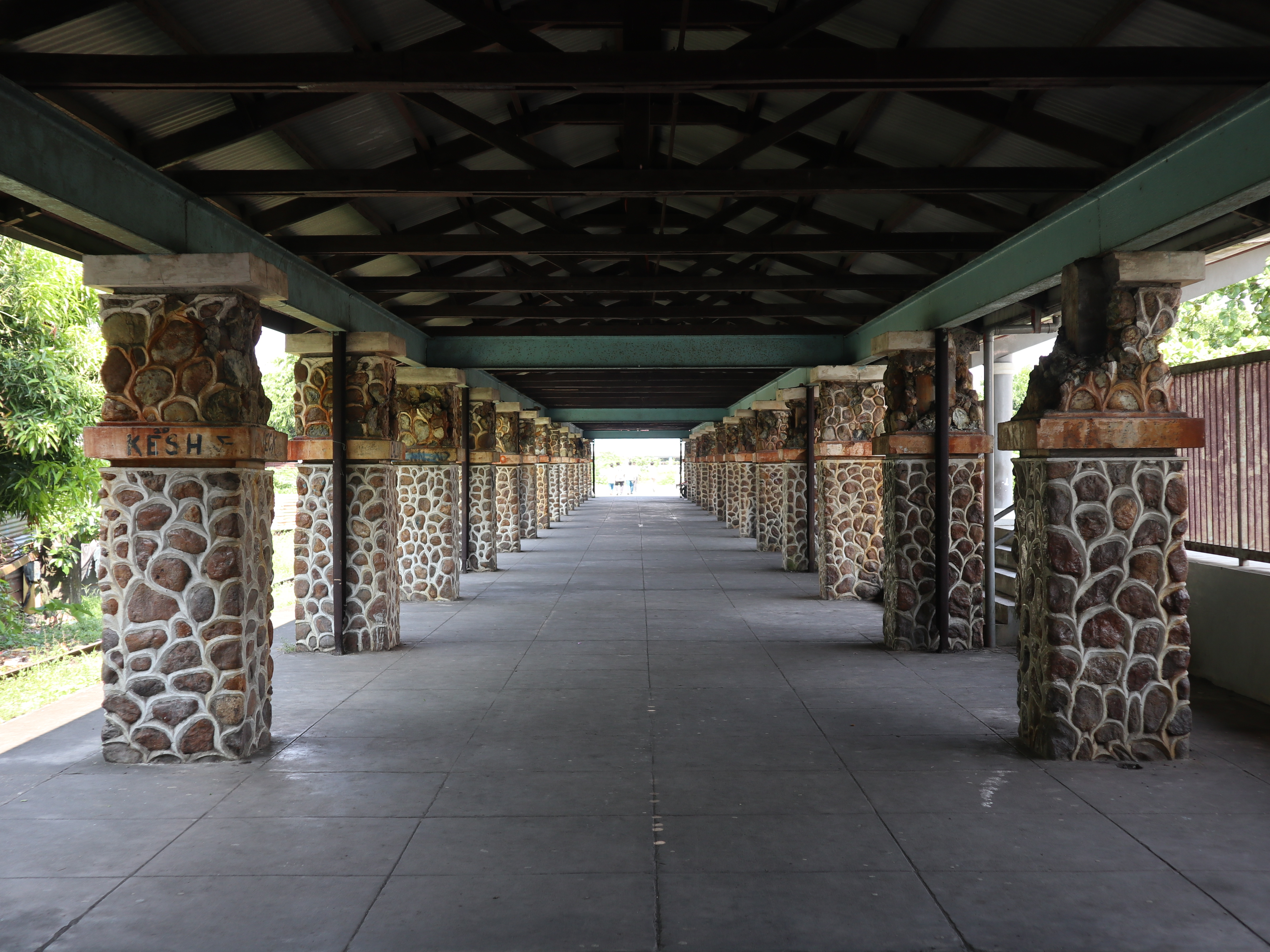
Platform

Legazpi was opened in November 1914 as part of the Legazpi Division Line from Tabaco, Albay to Iriga, Camarines Sur. The pebbled station building was built in 1939 after the completion of the Manila-Legazpi Line.

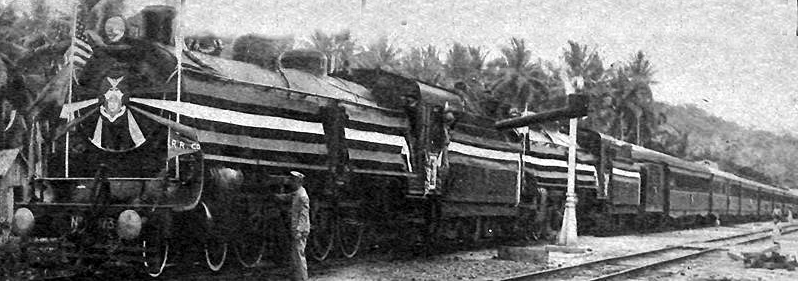
The Manila Railroad celebrated the first Manila–Legazpi Bicol Express on May 8, 1938.

The series of on and off operations of services can be dated back since 1941 during the arrival of the Japanese, rail tracks were destroyed as ordered by the USAFFE, interrupting services, the Japanese Imperial Army restored services on March 22, 1943, but to be halted again due to heavy damages brought by the liberation, services were once again restored on December 21, 1948.

During its peak in the 1970s, the PNR mainline track ran from La Union Province in the north to Legazpi City in the Bicol region for a total distance of 900 km. Today, the PNR's only operations are commuter lines on the 56-km section from Tutuban in Manila to Calamba in Laguna Province and on the 35-km section from Naga to Sipocot in the Bicol region. The long distance passenger service from Manila to Legazpi Albay has been suspended on and off because of typhoon damage to bridges. Track, bridge, and station infrastructure, however, remains largely in place from Tutuban to Legazpi, Albay.

The location of the railroad at the foot of Mayon Volcano often cause landslide and lahar floods which interrupt services. One was in 1976; services were restored on February 23, 1986. Operations stopped again from February 2, 1993, due to the eruption of the Mayon Volcano; services were again restored on June 21, 1998, until the bridge at Travesia, Guinobatan was washed away in 2006.

After years of neglect PNR Legazpi station Last Repair works were done in 2014, when PNR was given Php1.7B for Manila-Bicol line rehab. The platform right side was raised in 2015 for the Bicol Commuter services. Since then the station has deteriorated and fallen to disrepair.

The PNR Legazpi Station in Albay stands as a vital link in the regional transportation network. However, Due to Budget constraints the project in 2019 to repair the station was deferred. With time, the station has deteriorated significantly, necessitating an exhaustive reconstruction effort.

In 2015, Hi-Tone Dev't. Corp constructed Legazpi Maintenance Shed.

From April 2017, the station saw a six-year absence of Bicol Commuter services due to a locomotive and rolling stock shortage. However, it opened again on December 27, 2023, resuming the 100-kilometer route from Naga City. The revived route offered four daily trips between the two cities.

On 10 November 2025, Bicol Commuter services to Legazpi were suspended after Typhoon Uwan caused significant damage to a bridge along the route in Guinobatan, Albay, with the Department of Transport (DOTr) immediately issuing a directive to fast-track repairs. Despite an initial reopening date of February 2026, services remain suspended as of July 2026. An inspection of the bridge was carried out on July 13, 2026, and damaged sleepers were removed while PNR continues the procurement process for machinery and materials to carry out the repair.

== Former Connecting Lines ==
A spur track used to connect the station to the Legazpi Port. A proof of this is an image of the area during the Japanese Occupation where a railroad crossing sign is visible and located beyond the station building.

The Tabaco line, which was originally part of the Legazpi Division line, was abandoned in 1936.
