= Guinobatan =

Municipality in Albay, Philippines

- Municipality
- Municipality of Guinobatan
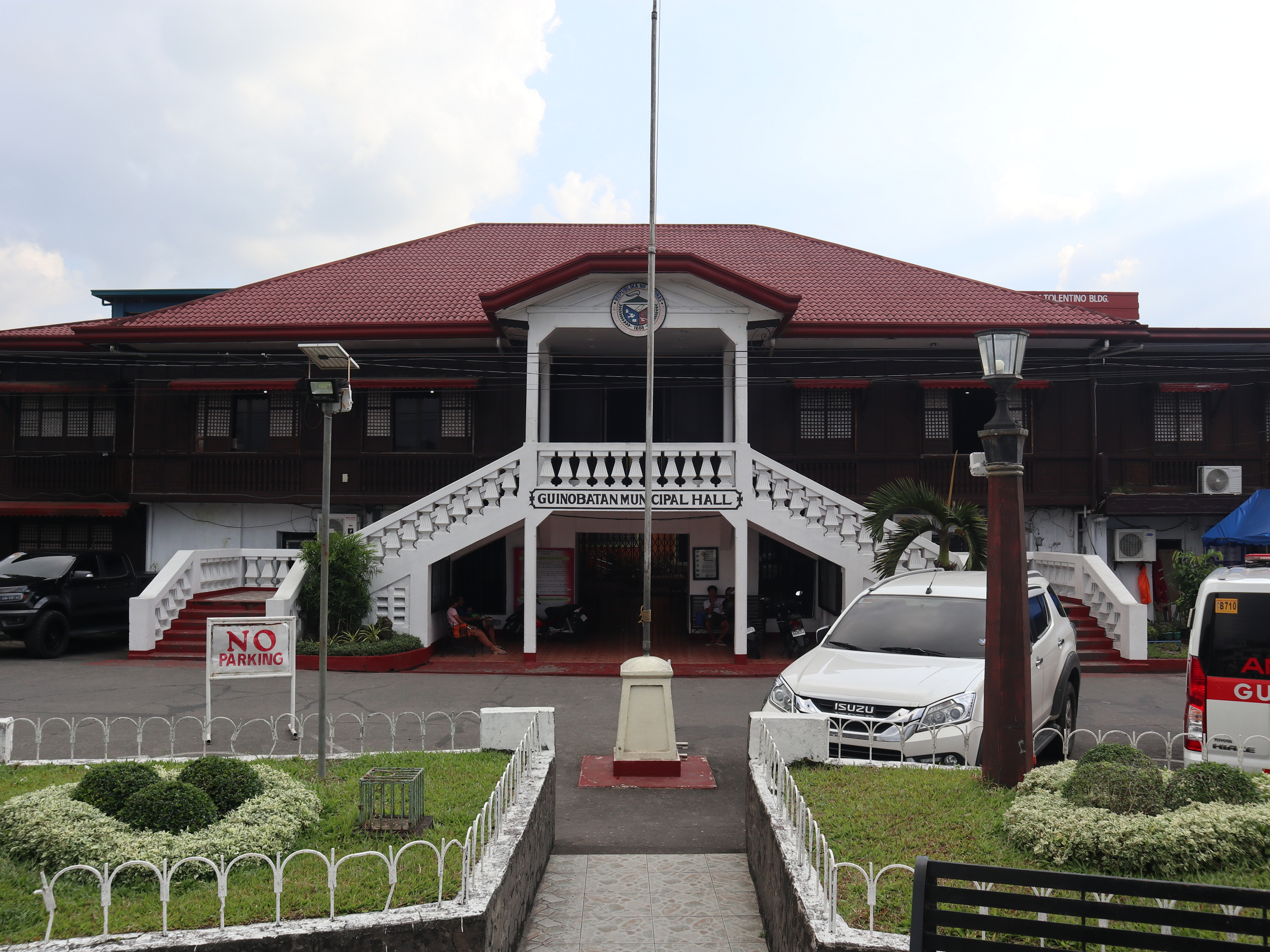
- Guinobatan Municipal Hall

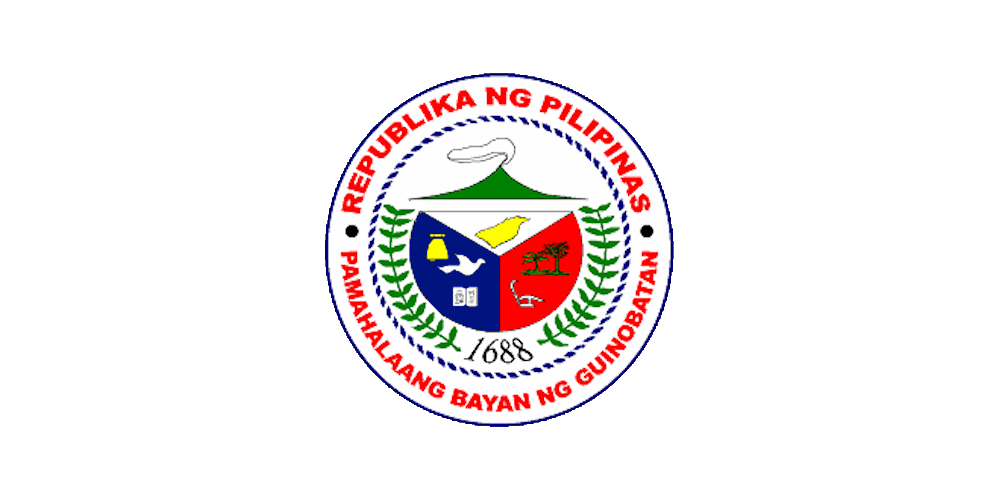
- Flag
- Nickname: The Sparkling Gem of Bicol
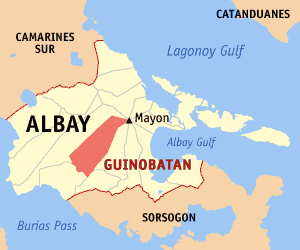
- Map of Albay with Guinobatan highlighted
- Interactive map of Guinobatan
- Location within the Philippines
- Coordinates: 13°11′N 123°36′E
- Country: Philippines
- Region: Bicol Region
- Province: Albay
- District: 3rd district
- Founded: 1672 (as a barrio of Camalig); 1688 (as a Municipal District); 1731 (as Pueblo de Guinobatan)
- Founder: Don Francisco Bagamasbad; Don Ambrosio Balagan; Don Diego Catindog; Don Juan Labao; Don Reymundo Dimasibot
- Barangays: 44 (see Barangays)

Government
  - Type: Sangguniang Bayan
  - Mayor: Ann Y. Ongjoco (NUP)
  - Vice Mayor: Dr. Rogelio G. Rivera (NUP)
  - Representative: Raymond Adrian E. Salceda (Lakas)
  - Municipal Council: Members: Kathleen Mae O. Padua; Marelen G. Flores; Julio S. Tingzon IV; Dominic Martin G. Amano; Ricky S. Matza; Wilfredo O. Arevalo, Sr.; Robert M. Bañaga; Rolando P. Palabrica
  - Electorate: 60,427 voters (2025)

Area
  - Total: 244.43 km^{2} (94.37 sq mi)
- Elevation: 169 m (554 ft)
- Highest elevation: 474 m (1,555 ft)
- Lowest elevation: 59 m (194 ft)

Population (2024 census)
  - Total: 84,420
  - Density: 345.4/km^{2} (894.5/sq mi)
  - Households: 20,327
- Demonym: Guinobateño Guinobatanon

Economy
  - Income class: 1st municipal income class
  - Poverty incidence: 23.99% (2023)
  - Revenue: ▲PHP 388.700 million (2022)
  - Assets: ▲PHP 1,072.000 million (2022)
  - Expenditure: ▲PHP 261.300 million (2022)
  - Liabilities: ▲PHP 265.000 million (2022)

Service provider
  - Electricity: Albay Electric Cooperative (ALECO)
  - Water: Guinobatan Water District
- Time zone: UTC+8 (PST)
- ZIP code: 4503
- PSGC: 0500504000
- IDD : area code: +63 (0)52
- Native languages: Tagalog, East Mirayá, Central Bíkol
- Feast date: August 15
- Catholic diocese: Diocese of Legazpi
- Patron saint: Nuestra Señora de la Asuncion
- Website: www.guinobatan.gov.ph

Guinobatan, officially the Municipality of Guinobatan (Central Bikol: Banwaan kan Guinobatan; East Mirayá Bikol: Banwa ning Guinobatan; Tagalog: Bayan ng Guinobatan), is a municipality in the province of Albay, Philippines. According to the 2024 census, it has a population of 84,420 people.

It is known for its chorizo locally called Longganiza de Guinobatan made by hands. Presently, it is recognized for its lively culture, yearly celebrations, and its title as “The Sparkling Gem of Bicol.” The town continues to play an important role in Albay’s story, preserving its traditions and reflecting the strength and perseverance of its people.

== History ==
=== Legend ===
In the research work "Guinobatan Through the Times," the following version of the legend is stated:

- In a region on Mayon's slopes lay a village. It was dotted with huts whose roofs were made of nipa, as well as with a number of stone houses. In the village was a church, and inside the belfry was a Golden Bell. So great was the bell that when rung, the sound could be heard from miles away. The sound could even reach the land of the Moros. The Moros, made curious by the sound of the bell, sent spies so that they would know what kind of bell was producing so loud and peculiar a sound. The spies were amazed and surprised to find out that the townspeople rang was made of pure gold. They went back to the land of the Moros eager to report their findings to their superiors. Motivated by greed, the Moros assembled a squad to plunder the bell. When they arrived at the village, they pillaged the community and torched houses. They attempted to force the people to tell them where the Golden Bell was. Their attempts failed. Many were still able to flee. The fleeing townsfolk knew where the bell was, and they hid the bell underneath the roots of trees. However, an old man was left in the village. As he was the only person left in the town; Moros tortured him so that he would tell the raiders where the Golden Bell was. The old man, however, did not know. Finding no use for the old man, the Moros killed him. They tried to pursue the townspeople, but they were too far away to be captured. Instead, they went to the woods in search of the Golden Bell. They uprooted every tree underneath which they believed the Golden Bell was hidden. Their efforts proved futile. Hence, with empty hands the Moros went back to their land, while the townspeople went back to the village to rebuild their lives, which had always been under threat from Moro pillagers and natural calamities; from bad harvests and oppressive encomienderos. The townspeople also kept the valued Golden Bell safe from anyone who tried to steal it. Seeing the uprooted trees, the townsfolk named their area “Guinobatan” meaning “a place where trees were uprooted.” So ends the legend.

Some versions also state that the town's name is derived from Ginabutan, meaning "a place where trees or plants were uprooted."

=== Spanish colonial era ===
Luis Née, a botanist, reached Bicol in January 1792, accompanying the expedition of Capt. Alejandro Malaspina. Née explored towns near Mayon and including the area now known as Guinobatan. He noted that "trees grew in exuberance making the foothills impenetrable in many parts."

Dr. Leonilo C. Palacio of Guinobatan's Republic Colleges mentioned in an essay entitled "Guinobatan and its Church" that "in 1672, the Parish of Guinobatan was already mentioned in books as a visita of the Municipality of Camalig."

In 1890, the title of the gobernadorcillo was changed to Capitan Municipal. The Municipal Law of 1894 guaranteed that the term of the local executive would be extended from two years to four years. Also among the salient provisions of the law was the election of 12 vocales, equivalent to today's councilors. In 1895, the Colegio de San Buenaventura was also built, making Guinobatan the centre for higher education in Albay.

Cabezas and principales elected the gobernadorcillo until 1863. Until 1847, Guinobatan belonged to Camarines. During the said year, the towns of Quipia, Camalig and Donsol (now in Sorsogon) were ceded to Albay, in exchange for the towns of the Partido de Lagonoy. From 1730 to 1818, the town transferred from one place to another. In 1730, it was on a site now called Binanuahan. From there, it was the relocated to Bubulusan. During the eruption of 1814, citizens opted to evacuate to higher ground, in Mauraro.

=== American colonial era ===
During the Philippine Revolution and the Philippine–American War (1898-1911), most of the schoolhouses built by the Spaniards were destroyed by constant artillery fire, most of which came from the Americans. As part of the "pacification" campaign of the Americans, engineers and architects were sent to the Philippines to oversee the construction of public works. Engr. Edward K. Bourne and famed urban planner Daniel Burnham, among other American architects and engineers, were instructed to go to Manila. In response, the Philippine Commission passed Act No. 268 which created the Bureau of Architecture and Construction of Public Buildings. Mr. Bourne was appointed as its head. In 1907, the Philippine Assembly was formed. Angel Roco of Mauraro, Guinobatan represented Albay in the Assembly. The same year, Assemblyman Isauro Gabaldon of Nueva Ecija authored an act which appropriated ₱1 million between 1907 and 1915 for "construction of schoolhouses of strong materials in barrios with guaranteed daily attendance of not less than sixty pupils…" Passing into law as Act No. 1801, the act became known as the "Gabaldon Act". Among the salient provisions was that no school could receive more than ₱4,000 unless the municipality to which the school belonged contributed at least 50% of the total amount granted to the school by the Gabaldon Act. The Gabaldon Act stipulated that only on land owned by the municipality could schools be constructed. Fifty-one "Gabaldons" were completed by 1911, and by 1916, four hundred five more were constructed. Among those completed between 1911 and 1916 was Guinobatan Central School blg. 1 or the Guinobatan East Central School's Gabaldon Building.

Potenciano Gregorio's Bikol language musical composition "Sarung Banggi" premiered at the town fiesta in Guinobatan in August 1910.

== Geography ==
According to the Philippine Statistics Authority, the municipality has a land area of 244.43 square kilometres (94.37 sq mi) constituting 9.49% of the 2,575.77-square-kilometre- (994.51 sq mi) total area of Albay.

The town of Guinobatan is located at 13°11′N 123°36′E. The territory of Guinobatan is bordered by a number of municipalities: Camalig on the east, Jovellar on the south, Pio Duran on the south-west, Ligao on the north-west. On the north-east, the town shares with Malilipot, Santo Domingo, Daraga, Tabaco and Legazpi, a common point in the crater of Mayon Volcano. Guinobatan is 17 kilometres (11 mi) from Legazpi City and 510 kilometres (320 mi) from Manila.

=== Barangays ===
Guinobatan is politically subdivided into 44 barangays. Each barangay consists of puroks and some have sitios.

PSGC	Barangay	Population			±% p.a.	
		2024		2010		
050504001	Agpay	0.5%	412	479	▾	−1.03%
050504002	Balite	0.8%	667	650	▴	0.18%
050504003	Banao	1.2%	1,027	1,089	▾	−0.40%
050504004	Batbat	1.7%	1,430	1,275	▴	0.79%
050504005	Binogsacan Lower	2.7%	2,265	2,283	▾	−0.05%
050504049	Binogsacan Upper	1.7%	1,410	1,409	▴	0.00%
050504006	Bololo	1.3%	1,083	1,286	▾	−1.18%
050504007	Bubulusan	1.8%	1,487	1,333	▴	0.76%
050504009	Calzada	3.2%	2,687	2,591	▴	0.25%
050504010	Catomag	1.2%	1,048	776	▴	2.09%
050504011	Doña Mercedes	2.0%	1,714	1,471	▴	1.06%
050504012	Doña Tomasa (Magatol)	2.2%	1,856	1,294	▴	2.52%
050504013	Ilawod	2.4%	2,033	1,954	▴	0.27%
050504015	Inamnan Grande	2.7%	2,292	2,334	▾	−0.13%
050504014	Inamnan Pequeño	1.9%	1,582	1,598	▾	−0.07%
050504016	Inascan	1.7%	1,446	1,502	▾	−0.26%
050504017	Iraya	1.6%	1,379	1,449	▾	−0.34%
050504018	Lomacao	2.4%	1,998	2,161	▾	−0.54%
050504021	Maguiron	2.5%	2,090	2,223	▾	−0.42%
050504022	Maipon	3.6%	3,045	3,789	▾	−1.50%
050504023	Malabnig	1.5%	1,228	1,142	▴	0.50%
050504024	Malipo	1.9%	1,610	1,822	▾	−0.85%
050504025	Malobago	2.3%	1,931	1,950	▾	−0.07%
050504026	Maninila	2.2%	1,832	1,788	▴	0.17%
050504027	Mapaco	1.8%	1,518	1,658	▾	−0.61%
050504008	Marcial O. Rañola (Cabaloaon)	0.6%	487	635	▾	−1.81%
050504029	Masarawag	4.2%	3,534	3,916	▾	−0.71%
050504030	Mauraro	8.8%	7,446	6,838	▴	0.59%
050504031	Minto	2.1%	1,810	1,764	▴	0.18%
050504032	Morera	2.6%	2,182	2,503	▾	−0.94%
050504034	Muladbucad Grande	3.2%	2,698	2,497	▴	0.54%
050504033	Muladbucad Pequeño	2.3%	1,901	2,048	▾	−0.51%
050504035	Ongo	1.3%	1,075	1,064	▴	0.07%
050504036	Palanas	0.4%	337	801	▾	−5.80%
050504038	Poblacion	1.3%	1,124	1,135	▾	−0.07%
050504040	Pood	0.8%	640	205	▴	8.17%
050504042	Quibongbongan	3.9%	3,251	3,054	▴	0.43%
050504041	Quitago	3.0%	2,498	2,740	▾	−0.64%
050504043	San Francisco	3.0%	2,533	3,188	▾	−1.57%
050504044	San Jose (Ogsong)	1.3%	1,072	959	▴	0.77%
050504045	San Rafael	5.0%	4,195	4,411	▾	−0.35%
050504046	Sinungtan	1.5%	1,300	1,415	▾	−0.58%
050504047	Tandarora	2.2%	1,827	1,449	▴	1.61%
050504048	Travesia	4.1%	3,440	3,858	▾	−0.79%
	Total		84,420	85,786	▾	−0.11%

=== Climate ===
Climate data for Guinobatan, Albay
Month	Jan	Feb	Mar	Apr	May	Jun	Jul	Aug	Sep	Oct	Nov	Dec	Year
Mean daily maximum °C (°F)	26 (79)	27 (81)	28 (82)	30 (86)	30 (86)	30 (86)	29 (84)	29 (84)	29 (84)	28 (82)	28 (82)	27 (81)	28 (83)
Mean daily minimum °C (°F)	22 (72)	22 (72)	22 (72)	23 (73)	24 (75)	25 (77)	24 (75)	24 (75)	24 (75)	24 (75)	23 (73)	23 (73)	23 (74)
Average precipitation mm (inches)	138 (5.4)	83 (3.3)	74 (2.9)	50 (2.0)	108 (4.3)	165 (6.5)	202 (8.0)	165 (6.5)	190 (7.5)	186 (7.3)	188 (7.4)	183 (7.2)	1,732 (68.3)
Average rainy days	16.8	11.9	13.5	13.8	20.5	25.2	27.4	26.2	26.1	24.7	20.7	18.5	245.3
Source: Meteoblue

== Demographics ==
Population census of Guinobatan
Year	Pop.	±% p.a.
1903	20,027	—
1918	25,113	+1.52%
1939	26,419	+0.24%
1948	32,280	+2.25%
1960	48,157	+3.39%
1970	47,190	−0.20%
1975	49,724	+1.05%
1980	53,639	+1.53%
1990	59,187	+0.99%
1995	65,512	+1.92%
2000	71,071	+1.76%
2007	74,386	+0.63%
2010	75,967	+0.77%
2015	82,361	+1.55%
2020	85,786	+0.86%
2024	84,420	−0.38%
Source: Philippine Statistics Authority

In the 2024 census, Guinobatan had a population of 84,420. The population density was 350 inhabitants per square kilometre (910/sq mi).

== Economy ==
Poverty incidence of Guinobatan (%)

Source: Philippine Statistics Authority

== Culture ==
Guinobatan Museum

Guinobatan hosts an annual festival in the celebration of Our Lady of Assumption, its patron saint. Until 2013, the town festival was called "Arandurugan Festival." In August 2013, Guinobatan celebrated Longganisa Festival, named after the local product which is listed under the Department of Trade and Industry's "One Town, One Product" program.

== Government ==
=== Elected officials ===
2025–2028 Guinobatan Municipal Officials
Position	Name	Party
Mayor	Ann Y. Ongjoco ♯	NUP
Vice Mayor	Dr. Rogelio G. Rivera +	NUP
Councilors	Kathleen Mae O. Padua ‹›	NUP
Councilors	Marelen G. Flores ‹›	Lakas
Councilors	Dominic Martin G. Amano +	Lakas
Councilors	Julio S. Tingzon, IV ‹›	NUP
Councilors	Ricky S. Matza ‹›	NUP
Councilors	Wilfredo O. Arevalo, Sr. +	Independent
Councilors	Roberto M. Bañaga ‹›	NUP
Councilors	Rolando P. Palabrica ‹›	Lakas
Ex Officio Municipal Council Members
ABC President	Reynaldo Namia (San Francisco)	Nonpartisan
SK Federation President	Keith John M. Pacardo (Inamnan Grande)	Nonpartisan

Legend
1. A + indicates that the official is elected for the first term
2. A ♯ indicates that the official is re-elected to a higher position
3. A ‹› indicates that the official is re-elected to the same position

=== Past municipal administrators ===
Spanish Colonial Era (1731-1898)
Inclusive years	Gobernadorcillo
1731	Don Lucas Timog
1732	Don Alonzo Lamberan
1733	Don Lazaro Dayaon
1734	Don Juan Baog
1735	Don Tomas Liniog
1736	Don Francisco Latumbo
1737	Don Andres Andog
1738	Don Bernardo Tarog
1739	Don Francisco Sabogan
1740	Don Santiago Macandog
1741	Don Geronimo Paglinisan
1742	Don Antonio Dignalan
1743	Don Alonzo Fernandez
1744	Don Agustin Cepeda
1745	Don Melchor Blanco
1746	Don Remigio Pimentel
1747	Don Francisco Aroyo
1748	Don Miguel Trilianco
1749	Don Diego Albares
1750	Don Alejandro Perez
1751	Don Juan Bautista
1752	Don Diego Perez
1753	Don Jose Oustria
1754	Don Alonzo Oco
1755	Don Francisco Javier
1756	Don Manuel Andrada
1757	Don Agustin Macasamno
1758	Don Antonio Oco
1759	Don Francisco Antones Caledat
1760	Don Melchor Perez
1761	Don Juan de Miranda
1762	Don Manuel Andrada
1763	Don Pacual Guillermo
1764	Don Diego de S. Vicente
1765	Don Pedro Alcantara
1766	Don Melchor Perez
1767-1768	Don Diego de S. Vicente
1769	Don Nicolas Perez
1770	Don Andres de los Angeles
1771	Don Alejandro Luis de Sta. Ana
1772	Don Gaspar de los Reyes
1773	Don Baltasar de los Reyes
1774	Don Pedro Torres de Miranda
1775-1776	Don Gaspar de los Reyes
1777	Don Pascual Leonardo
1778	Don Andres de los Reyes
1779	Don Gaspar de los Reyes
1780	Don Jose Natividad
1781	Don Alonso Guillermo
1782	Don Gaspar de los Reyes
1783	Don Juan Lazaro
1784	Don Juan de los Reyes
1785	Don Francisco Tomas
1786	Don Alonso Crisanto
1787	Don Jose Alejandrino
1788	Don Pascual Leonardo
1789	Don Alonso de los Reyes
1790	Don Gaspar de los Reyes
1791	Don Franco Antonio Mataraguis
1792	Don Francisco Evaristo
1793	Don Gaspar de los Reyes
1794	Don Jose Alejandrino
1795	Don Antonio Rafael Sta. Ana
1796	Don Alonso de los Reyes
1797	Don Franco Ignacio Budling
1798	Don Francisco Evaristo
1799	Don Juan Pascual S. Agustin
1800	Don Francisco Felix
1801	Don Felipe Rodriguez
1802	Don Juan Bautista
1803	Don Santiago de Villafuerte
1804	Don Pascual Leonardo
1805	Don Pedro Ignacio Seping
1806	Don Franco Irisaro Valentin
1807	Don Juan Reynaldo
1808	Don Juan de S. Vicente
1809	Don Juan de S. Buenaventura
1810	Don Domingo de Guzman
1811	Don Jose Perez
1812	Don Antonio Rafael Sta. Ana
1813	Don Domingo Rodrigo
1814	Don Manuel Fernando
1815	Don Antonio Rafael Sta. Ana
1816	Don Juan de S. Antonio
1817	Don Miguel Geronimo
1818	Don Jose Alejandrino
1819	Don Miguel Geronimo
1820	Don Pedro Miguel S. Vicente
1821	Don Marcos Sta. Ana
1822	Don Alonso Casimiro
1823	Don Ignacio Silas
1824	Don Pedro de los Santos
1825	Don Pedro Miguel S. Vicente
1826	Don Jose Bernardo
1827	Don Francisco Valenzuela
1828	Don Lazaro de los Reyes
1829	Don Marcos Sta. Ana
1830	Don Lazaro de la Cruz
1831	Don Domingo del Espiritu Sto.
1832	Don Antonio de los Reyes
1833	Don Marcos Sta. Ana
1834	Don Pedro Villafuerte
1835	Don Nicolas Gonzales
1836	Don Julian Mariano
1837	Don Julian Remigio
1838	Don Francisco M. Peñaflor
1839	Don Pedro Javier
1840	Don Francisco N. Palacio
1841	Don Francisco M. Peñaflor
1842	Don Jose Perez
1843	Don Pascual de los Reyes
1844	Don Gregorio de los Reyes
1845	Don Antonio L. Divinagracia
1846	Don Francisco Langcauon
1847	Don Francisco Javier
1848	Don Francisco M. Peñaflor
1849	Don Antonio Lazaro
1850	Don Tomas Olaguer
1851	Don Francisco M. Peñaflor
1852	Don Salvador Mallorca
1853	Don Gil O. Fernandez
1854	Don Francsico M. Peñaflor
1855	Don Salvador Mallorca
1856	Don Vicente Orbeta
1857	Don Andres Obed
1858	Don Tomas Olaguer
1859	Don Antonio L. Divinagracia
1860	Don Francisco M. Peñaflor
1861	Don Francisco N. Palacio
1862	Don Francisco M. Peñaflor
1863-1864	Don Mariano Marcayda
1865-1866	Don Francisco M. Peñaflor
1867-1868	Don Mariano Ope
1869-1870	Don Alfonso Matienzo
1871-1872	Don Gregorio de Leon
1873-1874	Don Dionisio Olmedillo
1875-1876	Dr. Julian O. Oyales
1877-1880	Don Jose Offemaria
1881-1882	Don Cirilo Y. Jaucian
1883-1884	Dr. Julian O. Oyales
1885-1886	Don Cirilo Y. Jaucian
1887-1888	Dr. Julian O. Oyales
1889-1890	Don Eugenio Otivar
1891-1893	Don Jose Arboleda
1894-1895	Don Eugenio Otivar
1896-1898	Don Cirilo Y. Jaucian

No.	Party	Municipal Mayor	Term of Office	Municipal Vice-Mayor	Notes
=== First Philippine Republic (1898-1901) ===
1	No Party	Francisco Lukban	December 22, 1898 - June, 1901 (2 years, 314 days)	Eustaquio Villanueva	(Elections held on October 31, 1898
=== Insular Government of the Philippine Islands (1900-1934) ===
2	Federalista	Señor Eugenio Pardiñas y Orolfo	February 23, 1900 – July 31, 1901 (1 year, 158 days)		
3		Don Cirilo Jaucian y Ynson	August 1, 1901 – August 31, 1903 (2 years, 30 days)	Sr. Eugenio O. Pardiñas	
4		Don Eligio Arboleda	September 1, 1903 – December 30, 1903 (Appointed)	Don Epifanio S. Orozco	(Died in office)
4		Don Eligio Arboleda	January 1, 1904 – July 19, 1904 (Elected) (322 days)	Don Epifanio S. Orozco	(Died in office)
5		Don Epifanio S. Orozco	July 20, 1904 – December 31, 1904 (164 days)		(Finished the term of Eligio Arboleda)
(3)		Don Cirilo Jaucian y Ynson	January 16, 1905 - January 4, 1907 (1 year, 353 days)		
(5)		Don Epifanio S. Orozco	January 7, 1907 – December 31, 1909 (2 years, 358 days)		
6		Don Simeon Ola y Arboleda	January 3, 1910 – October 14, 1912 (2 years, 285 days)		
7		Don Agapito Paulate y Olaguer	October 15, 1912 - October 14, 1916 (3 years, 365 days)		Established the Guinobatan Central School Bldg. 1
(6)		Don Simeon Ola y Arboleda	October 15, 1916 - October 14, 1919 (2 years, 364 days)		
8		Don Juan Lorica y Munda	October 15, 1919 - October 14, 1922 (2 years, 364 days)	Don Santiago Diaz	
9		Don Justiniano de los Reyes	October 15, 1922 - October 14, 1928 (5 years, 365 days)	Dr. Damaso R. Labanan (1926–1928)	
10		Don Fructuoso Rañola	October 15, 1928 - March 10, 1930 (1 year, 146 days)	Don Deogracias O. Paulate	(Died in office)
11		Don Deogracias Paulate y Olaguer	March 11, 1930 - October 14, 1931 (1 year, 217 days)		
12		Don Canuto Razal y Rebonquin	October 15, 1931 - October 14, 1934 (2 years, 364 days)	Don Alejandro Oliva	(Won the Special Elections of 1934 and served until 1937)
=== Commonwealth of the Philippines (1935-1946) ===
(12)		Don Canuto R. Razal	October 15, 1934 - December 30, 1937 (2 years, 364 days)	Don Alejandro Oliva	(Erected the monument of Rizal at the Town Plaza)
13	Democrata	Engr. Julian O. Ofrasio	January 1, 1938 - 1941 (3 years, 225 days)	Carlos Pardo	(Died in office)
14	Democrata	Carlos O. Pardo	1941 - 1942 (2 years, 260 days)		(Finished the term of Mayor Julian Ofrasio, Japanese Invasion Dec. 12, 1941)
=== Japanese occupation of the Philippines & Second Philippine Republic (1942-1945) ===
15	KALIBAPI	Sergio O. Palencia, Sr.	1942 - 1943		(Japanese Appointed)
16	KALIBAPI	Capt. Brigido Sison	1943 - April 30, 1944		(Japanese Appointed)
17	KALIBAPI	Dionisio Q. Roa	May 1, 1944 – August 15, 1945 (1 year, 106 days)		(Japanese Appointed)
=== Commonweath Restoration (1945-1946) ===
18		Carlos O. Pardo	September 29, 1945 – June 14, 1946 (258 days)	Gregorio Alban (Sept. 29, 1945-March 1, 1946)	Acting Mayor, Appointed by Pres. Sergio Osmeña, Established the Albay High School - Guinobatan
18		Carlos O. Pardo	September 29, 1945 – June 14, 1946 (258 days)	Eligio Osia (March 1, 1946- June 28, 1946)	Acting Mayor, Appointed by Pres. Sergio Osmeña, Established the Albay High School - Guinobatan
19	Liberal	Dr. Tirzo O. de los Reyes, Sr.	June 14, 1946 – July 4, 1946 (20 days)	Rafael Olmos (June 28, 1946-July 04, 1946)	Appointed by Pres. Manuel Roxas
=== Third Philippine Republic (1946-1973) ===
(19)	Liberal	Dr. Tirzo O. de los Reyes, Sr.	July 4, 1946 – September 9, 1947 (1 year, 67 days)	Rafael J. Olmos (July 04, 1946- December 30, 1947)	Appointed by Pres. Manuel Roxas
20		Eligio Osia	September 9, 1947 – December 30, 1947 (112 days)	Rafael J. Olmos (July 04, 1946- December 30, 1947)	Appointed by Pres. Manuel Roxas
(19)	Liberal	Dr. Tirzo O. de los Reyes, Sr.	January 1, 1948 – 1957 (9 years, 286 days)	Eugenio Ordiz (1948-1949)	Resigned in 1957 and run for Congressman in the 3rd District of Albay
(19)	Liberal	Dr. Tirzo O. de los Reyes, Sr.	January 1, 1948 – 1957 (9 years, 286 days)	Martin O. Garcia (1949–1951)	Resigned in 1957 and run for Congressman in the 3rd District of Albay
(19)	Liberal	Dr. Tirzo O. de los Reyes, Sr.	January 1, 1948 – 1957 (9 years, 286 days)	Jose V. Cevallos (1952–1955)	Resigned in 1957 and run for Congressman in the 3rd District of Albay
(19)	Liberal	Dr. Tirzo O. de los Reyes, Sr.	January 1, 1948 – 1957 (9 years, 286 days)	Jose B. Garcia (1956–1957)	Resigned in 1957 and run for Congressman in the 3rd District of Albay
21	Nacionalista	Jose B. Garcia	1957 - December 30, 1963 (6 years, 76 days)	Dr. Tirzo O. de los Reyes, Sr. (May 9, 1958-December 31, 1959)	
21	Nacionalista	Jose B. Garcia	1957 - December 30, 1963 (6 years, 76 days)	Antonio Papa (1960–1963)	
22	Liberal	Atty. Jose P. Oira	January 1, 1964 - December 30, 1967 (3 years, 363 days)	Nestorio O. Olaguer (January 01, 1964-December 30, 1971)	
(21)	Nacionalista	Jose B. Garcia	January 1, 1968 - January 16, 1973 (5 years, 15 days)	Nestorio O. Olaguer (January 01, 1964-December 30, 1971)	
=== Martial Law & Fourth Philippine Republic (1973-1986) ===
(21)	Nacionalista	Jose B. Garcia	January 17, 1973 - February 2, 1980 (7 years, 16 days)	Felipe Duran (1972–1980)	
(21)	KBL	Martin O. Garcia	March 01, 1980 - February 25, 1986 (5 years, 361 days)	Emiliano M. Ongjoco, MD (1980–1986)	
=== Provisional Government (1986-1987) ===
23	Liberal	Juan Miguel M. Garcia, II	March 1986 – February 1, 1988 (1 year, 333 days)	Floria M. Tuason	Appointed OIC by Pres. Corazon Aquino

=== Fifth Philippine Republic (1987-Present) ===
No.	Party	Municipal Mayor	Term of Office	Municipal Vice Mayor	SK Federation President	ABC President	Remarks
24		Juan G. Rivera	February 2, 1988 – October 10, 1990 (2 years, 251 days)				
(23)	Liberal	Juan Miguel M. Garcia, II	October 10, 1990 – June 30, 1998 (7 years, 263 days)	Floria M. Tuason (1990–1995)	Amiel Ian P. Opeña (1993–1996)		
(23)	Liberal	Juan Miguel M. Garcia, II	October 10, 1990 – June 30, 1998 (7 years, 263 days)	Ruben P. Olavario (1995–1998)	Christopher O. Palevino (1996–2001)		
(24)		Juan G. Rivera	June 30, 1998 – June 30, 2001 (3 years, 0 days)	Jesus S. Remendado, Jr., DMD	Christopher O. Palevino (1996–2001)		
25	Aksyon Demokratiko	Christopher Dy-Liacco Flores	June 30, 2001 – June 30, 2004 (3 years, 0 days)	Wilfredo O. Arevalo, Sr.	Sammy N. Pales (2001–2002)	Prudencio N. Manrique (Masarawag) (2002–2004)	Reduced the Poverty incidence of the Municipality to 5.75% and started the Pagsuwak Festival
25	Aksyon Demokratiko	Christopher Dy-Liacco Flores	June 30, 2001 – June 30, 2004 (3 years, 0 days)	Wilfredo O. Arevalo, Sr.	Jane R. Arevalo (2002–2003)	Prudencio N. Manrique (Masarawag) (2002–2004)	Reduced the Poverty incidence of the Municipality to 5.75% and started the Pagsuwak Festival
(23)	Lakas	Juan Miguel M. Garcia, II	June 30, 2004 - June 30, 2013 (9 years, 0 days)	Atty. Generoso Alejo R. Villareal (2004–2007)	Gloren Naparato (2004 - August 13, 2007)	Sofia O. Orpiada (Iraya) (2004–2007)	started the Arandurugan Festival
(23)	Lakas	Juan Miguel M. Garcia, II	June 30, 2004 - June 30, 2013 (9 years, 0 days)	Wilfredo O. Arevalo, Sr. (2007–2013)	Jane R. Arevalo (August 21, 2007-November 2007)	Jose M. Padilla (Ilawod) (2007–2010)	started the Arandurugan Festival
(23)	Lakas	Juan Miguel M. Garcia, II	June 30, 2004 - June 30, 2013 (9 years, 0 days)	Wilfredo O. Arevalo, Sr. (2007–2013)	John Rey G. Namia (San Francisco) ( December 2007-2010)	Jose M. Padilla (Ilawod) (2007–2010)	started the Arandurugan Festival
(23)	Lakas	Juan Miguel M. Garcia, II	June 30, 2004 - June 30, 2013 (9 years, 0 days)	Wilfredo O. Arevalo, Sr. (2007–2013)	Patrick Polly C. Pintor (Iraya) (2010–2013)	Paul N. Garcia (Iraya) (2010–2013)	started the Arandurugan Festival
26	Nacionalista	Ann Y. Ongjoco	June 30, 2013 – June 30, 2022 (9 years, 0 days)	Julio S. Tingzon, IV (2013-2019)	No SK (2013–2018)	Jose M. Padilla (Ilawod) (2013–August 9, 2021)	First female municipal mayor of Guinobatan Started the Longganisa de Guinobatan Festival which promoted the Towns product
26	Liberal	Ann Y. Ongjoco	June 30, 2013 – June 30, 2022 (9 years, 0 days)	Rolando P. Palabrica (2019–2022)	Matthew O. Orpiada (Iraya) (June 30, 2018–November 30, 2023)	Remedios R. Mar (Batbat) (August 10, 2021–November 30, 2023)	First female municipal mayor of Guinobatan Started the Longganisa de Guinobatan Festival which promoted the Towns product
26	PDPLBN	Ann Y. Ongjoco	June 30, 2013 – June 30, 2022 (9 years, 0 days)	Rolando P. Palabrica (2019–2022)	Matthew O. Orpiada (Iraya) (June 30, 2018–November 30, 2023)	Remedios R. Mar (Batbat) (August 10, 2021–November 30, 2023)	First female municipal mayor of Guinobatan Started the Longganisa de Guinobatan Festival which promoted the Towns product
27	PDPLBN	Paul N. Garcia	June 30, 2022 – June 30, 2025 (3 years, 0 days)	Ann Y. Ongjoco	Keith John M. Pacardo (Inamnan Grande) (December 01, 2023 - Incumbent)	Reynaldo O. Namia (San Francisco) (December 01, 2023 - Incumbent)	Established the Guinobatan Community College
(26)	NUP	Ann Y. Ongjoco	June 30, 2025 – Present; 1 year, 122 days	Rogelio G. Rivera, MD	Keith John M. Pacardo (Inamnan Grande) (December 01, 2023 - Incumbent)	Reynaldo O. Namia (San Francisco) (December 01, 2023 - Incumbent)	Incumbent

== Education ==
There are two schools district offices which govern all educational institutions within the municipality. They oversee the management and operations of all private and public, from primary to secondary schools. These are the:

- Guinobatan East Schools District
- Guinobatan West Schools District

There are almost 45 daycare centers, 3 private pre-schools, 33 public elementary schools, 5 private elementary schools, 6 public high schools, 4 private high schools and 4 tertiary schools in the municipality.

=== Primary and elementary schools ===
- Al-Madrasah Academy
- Albay Sports Academy
- Balite Elementary School
- Bat-Bat Elementary School
- Binogsacan Elementary School
- Bololo Elementary School
- Bubulusan Elementary School
- Cabaloaon Elementary School
- Catomag Elementary School
- Don Juan Garcia Elementary School
- Doña Elena Mitre Garcia Elementary School
- Doña Irene Elementary School
- Doña Mercedes Elementary School
- Dr. Felipe Cevallos Elementary School
- Fide Christian Academy
- Guinobatan East Central School
- Guinobatan West Central School
- Headed by: PSDS Edgar Orellana
- Headed by: PSDS Ma. Theresa Nasayao
- Inascan Elementary School
- Libas Elementary School
- Lomacao Elementary School
- Maipon Elementary School
- Malabnig Elementary School
- Malipo Elementary School
- Malobago Elementary School
- Manases Olaybal Memorial Elementary School
- Maninila Elementary School
- Mapaco Elementary School
- Masarawag Elementary School
- Mauraro Elementary School
- Morera Elementary School
- Muladbucad Elementary School
- Muladbucad Grande Elementary School
- Ongo Elementary School
- Palanas Elementary School
- Pood Elementary School
- Rainbow Kids School
- Rebagay Foundation Elementary School
- Rich Minds Basic Center
- San Jose Elementary School
- St. Benedict’s Academy
- Teofila O. Baylen Memorial Adventist Multigrade School
- Travesia Elementary School

=== Secondary schools ===
- Albay Institute, established in 1902, is a defunct institution, the Americans first opened the AHS at Guinobatan with a population of 52 students and 3 American Teachers, due to the cholera outbreak the institution shut down and was transferred to another municipality.
- Albay Sports Academy
- Balite High School (Proposed new high school)
- Bat-Bat National High School
- Fide Christian Academy located at Rizal St. Iraya
- Lower Binogsacan National High School
- Malipo National High School
- Marcial O. Rañola Memorial School is located at Maharlika Highway, San Francisco, Guinobatan, and started as Albay High School Guinobatan (AHSG) in September 1945 through the initiatives of Hon. Marcial O. Rañola, and Mayor Carlos Pardo. Mr. Jose Ramirez was the inaugural holder of school principal with 12 teachers for the 400 pioneer students. In 1948, the P.T.A. with Mr. Lorenzo Oliver, President purchased the 8 hectare lot which is the present site. In 1954, Hon. Pio Duran espoused the construction of the pre-fabricated buildings under Mr. Pacifico Y. Garcia, Principal. A.H.S.G. became an ICA-NEC pilot school and recipient of equipment, tools and appliances for Science and Technology subjects in 1959. In 1963, the school was nationalized by R.A. No. 3161 sponsored by Hon. Josefina Belmonte–Duran R.A. 3723 was also passed by her naming the school Pio Duran Memorial School in honor of the late Hon. Pio Duran, her predecessor in Congress and school benefactor. On June 17, 1967, R.A. No. 5055 sponsored by Hon. Belmonte-Duran named the school Marcial O. Rañola Memorial School to commemorate the precursor of this institution.
- Masarawag National High School
- Mauraro High School
- PLT Colleges of Guinobatan Senior High School located at Barangay San Francisco
- Republic Colleges of Guinobatan located at G. Alban St. Iraya
- St. Benedict’s Academycame into existence on May 22, 1958, through the combined efforts of Rt. Msgr. Demetrio Valeza and a few militant ladies of the Catholic Women's League, Guinobatan Unit who were bent on having a Catholic school in the town for the cultural and moral upliftment of the youth. The Benedictine Sisters were requested to administer the school. On June 1, 1958, the new school was blessed by Bishop Ariola of Legazpi. Classes began the next day. After two weeks, there were 25 little boys and girls in kindergarten and 36 girls in the first year high school. Such were the auspicious beginnings of SBA. When the burgeoning school population could no longer be accommodated in two-room cabin, a modern concrete building was built in 1961. In that same year the High School Department began to include boys. In 1972, the foundation of two-story building for Elementary School was laid. Improvements were undertaken as the school continued to grow.

=== Vocational schools ===
- TESDA - Provincial Training Center

=== Higher educational institutions ===
- Colegio de San Buenaventura (1895-1900) is located at the present site of St. Benedict's Academy, it is considered as the first tertiary institution in the Province of Albay. It first opened on January 7, 1895 with a population of 297 students and 14 instructors. During the Philippine-American war, Col. Ignacio Paua, set the institution to ablaze due to the advancement of the American forces.
- Bicol University - Guinobatan is located in Barangay Ilawod, Morera and Mauraro, it was first established as the Guinobatan Rural High School by Dr. Felipe Cevallos as its founder and held its first classes on June 3, 1912 . It was renamed as Guinobatan Agricultural School in 1927; Roxas Memorial Agricultural School in 1950; Bicol University College of Agriculture (BUCA) in 1969 through RA 5521 and now known as Bicol University College of Agriculture and Forestry (BUCAF) because of the offering of Bachelor of Science in Forestry which started in 1991, and in 2022 it was renamed as the Bicol University Guinobatan Campus.
- Republic Colleges is a non-sectarian institution located at G. Alban st., Iraya, it was first established as the Republic Academy in 1947. It offers the following programs: MA in Education G.R. No. 74 s. 1979 – DCO, MA in Public Administration G.R. No. NA s. NA – NA, Bachelor in Elementary Education G.R. No. 165 s. 1970 – DCO, Bachelor in Secondary Education G.R. No. 194 s. 1966 – DCO, BS in Business Administration G.R. No. 195 s. 1966 – DCO, BS in Computer Science G.R. No. H-0008 s. 1996 - CRO
- Guinobatan Community College is established in 2024, catering tertiary education to the underprivileged and rural areas of the municipalities of Guinobatan, Jovellar and Camalig in the province of Albay. The institution started to operate in 2025 and offered BS in Entrepreneurship as its pioneer course. In 2026 it will offer B. in Elementary Ed., B. in Culture and Arts Ed. and B. in Special Needs Ed.
- PLT Colleges Inc. of Guinobatan

== Notable personalities ==
- Francis Tolentino, former MMDA Chairmanship
- Elizabeth Oropesa, actress
- Henry Omaga Diaz, YouTuber
- Pio Duran, former representative of the 3rd District of Albay (1949-1961)
- Ramon Paje, 19th DENR Secretary
- Simeón Ola, considered as the last general to surrender
