= Andaya Highway =

National primary road in Luzon, Philippines

Rolando Andaya Highway
- Quirino Highway; Camarines Sur–Quezon Road
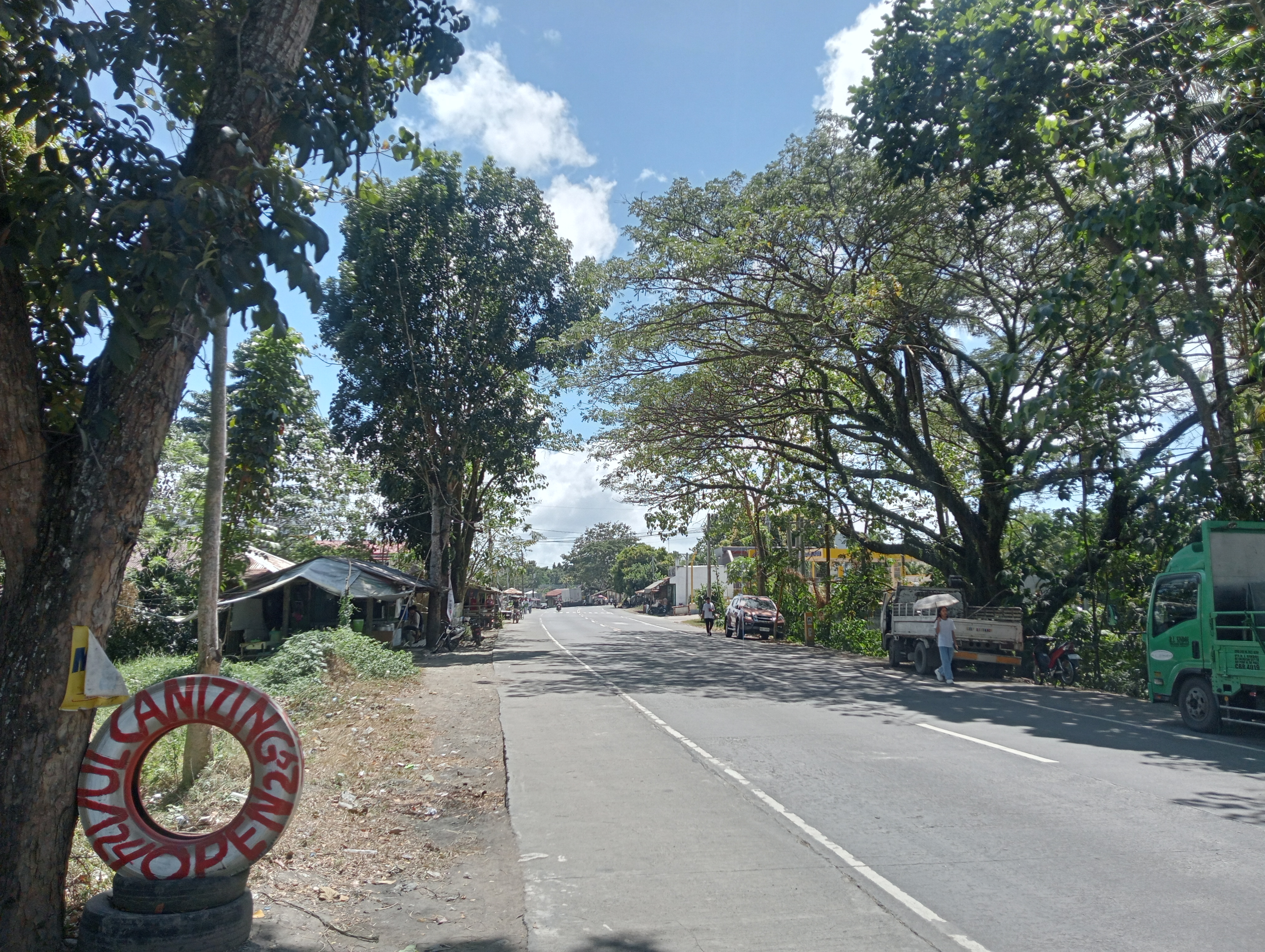
- The highway at Godofredo Reyes Sr., Ragay, Camarines Sur

Route information
- Maintained by Department of Public Works and Highways – Camarines Norte District Engineering Office, Quezon 4th District Engineering Office, and Camarines Sur 1st District Engineering Office
- Length: 92.65 km (57.57 mi)
- Existed: 1950s–present
- Component highways: N68

Major junctions
- Northwest end: AH 26 (N1) (Maharlika Highway) in Santa Elena, Camarines Norte
- Southeast end: AH 26 (N1) (Maharlika Highway) in Sipocot, Camarines Sur

Location
- Country: Philippines
- Regions: Bicol Region, Calabarzon
- Provinces: Camarines Norte, Quezon, Camarines Sur
- Towns: Santa Elena, Calauag, Guinayangan, Tagkawayan, Del Gallego, Ragay, Lupi, Sipocot

Highway system
- Roads in the Philippines; Highways; Expressways; List
← N67	→ N69

Rolando Andaya Highway, officially known as Quirino Highway and also known as Camarines Sur–Quezon Road, is a national primary highway located in the provinces of Camarines Norte, Quezon, and Camarines Sur in the Philippines. It serves as an alternative route to the Pan-Philippine Highway and has been used as a major highway since the 1990s. It traverses the municipality of Santa Elena in Camarines Norte, the municipalities of Sipocot, Lupi, Ragay, and Del Gallego in Camarines Sur, and the municipalities of Tagkawayan, Guinayangan, and Calauag in Quezon. It is primarily known as Andaya Highway in segments within Camarines Sur and likewise called as Quirino Highway within Camarines Norte and Quezon.

The entire highway is designated as National Route 68 (N68) of the Philippine highway network.

== History ==
The construction of the highway began in around the 1950s, during the term of President Elpidio Quirino, thus being called Quirino Highway. Being discontinuous for decades, it was funded in 1976 by virtue of Presidential Decree No. 759 by President Ferdinand Marcos. The plan for the road was to connect the towns of Del Gallego and Ragay, as well as Ragay Port, all in Camarines Sur, to the Maharlika Highway. The highway opened in 1984. Between 1992 and 1999, it was extended to Sipocot, Camarines Sur.

In 2004, an entire segment within Camarines Sur was renamed to Rolando R. Andaya Highway, in honor of the late representative from the province, by virtue of Republic Act No. 9234.

Severe traffic congestion occurred on the highway in mid-December 2024 due to road slips that temporarily closed the Labo segment of the nearby Pan-Philippine Highway and portions of the highway itself in Lupi. A concurrent repair project on the Lupi segment further exacerbated the problem. The Department of Public Works and Highways pledged non-stop work to resolve the situation.

== Route description ==
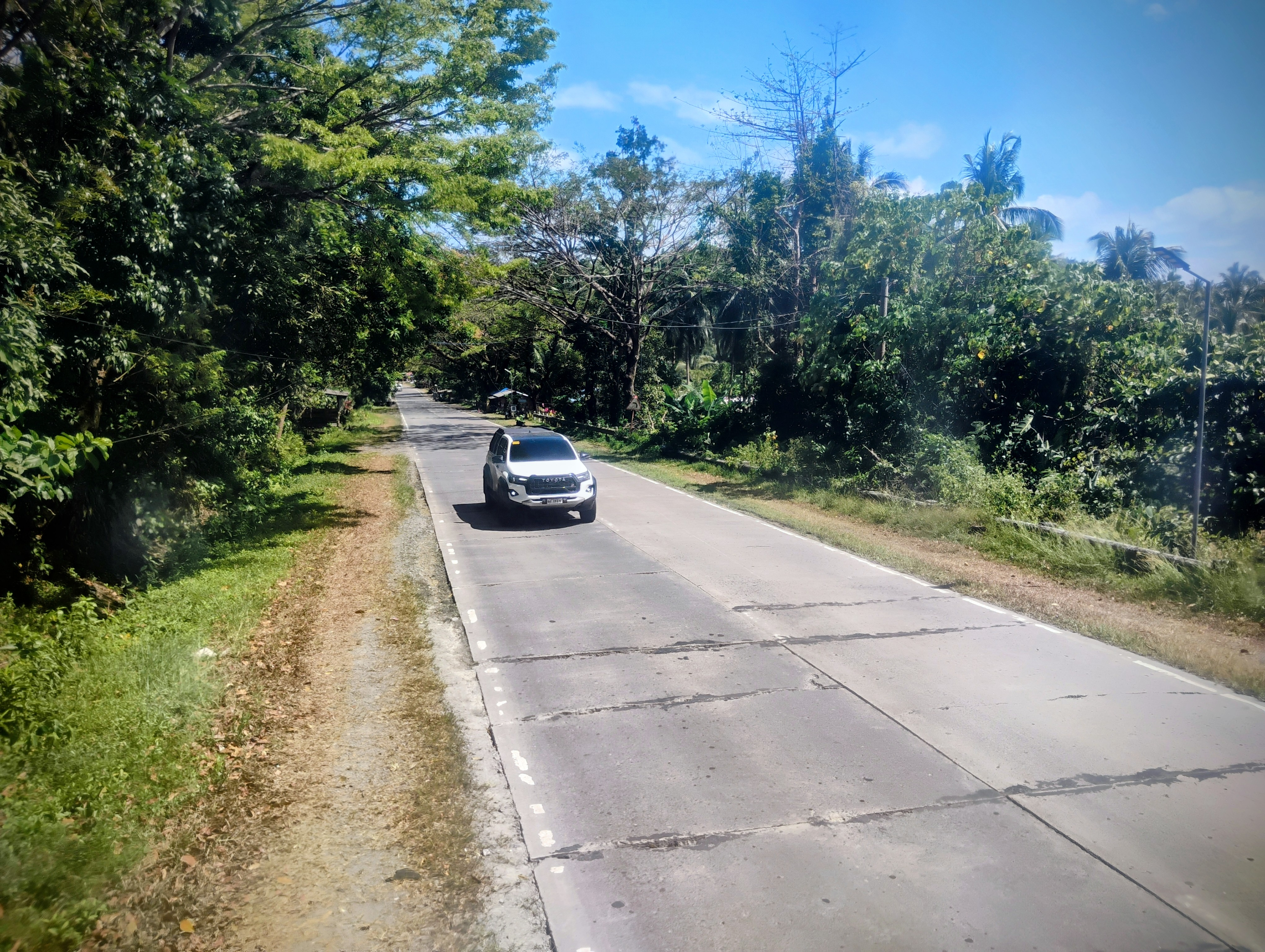
The highway in Tagkawayan, Quezon

The highway starts at its intersection with Maharlika Highway in Tabugon, Santa Elena, Camarines Norte. It then enters the province of Quezon and traverses the towns of Calauag by a small section, Guinayangan, and Tagkawayan, where it bypasses its municipal center. It re-enters Bicol Region, this time at Camarines Sur and traverses Del Gallego, Ragay, Lupi, and Sipocot, where it ends and reunites with Maharlika Highway. Thus, the highway serves as a shorter and alternative route to Maharlika Highway, which traverses the northern part of Camarines Norte and Camarines Sur.

== Intersections ==
Intersection	Location	Remarks
Tabugon Junction	Santa Elena, Camarines Norte	The Northwestern terminus of the Andaya Highway. The road goes to Manila and Daet, Camarines Norte.
Sipocot Junction	Sipocot, Camarines Sur	The Southeastern terminus of Andaya Highway. The road goes to Naga, Camarines Sur, Sipocot Town Proper & Daet, Camarines Norte
