= Del Gallego =

Municipality in Camarines Sur, Philippines

Del Gallego Danawin
- Municipality
- Municipality of Del Gallego
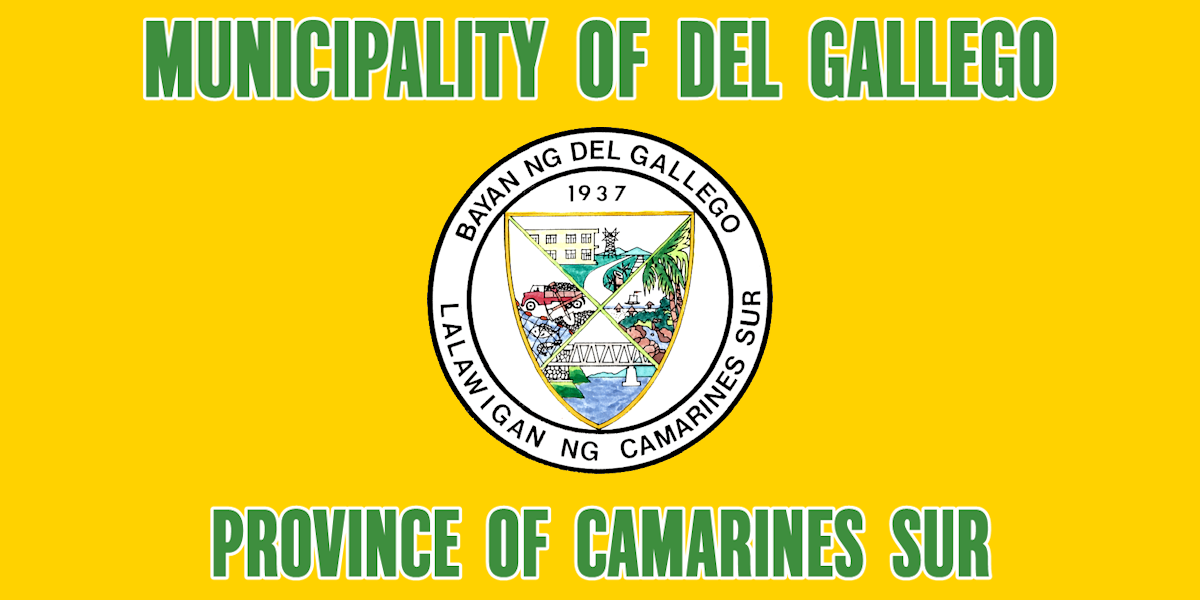
- Flag Seal
- Motto: Sulong Del Gallego!
- Map of Camarines Sur with Del Gallego highlighted
- Interactive map of Del Gallego
- Location within the Philippines
- Coordinates: 13°55′24″N 122°35′46″E
- Country: Philippines
- Region: Bicol Region
- Province: Camarines Sur
- District: 1st district
- Founded: October 5, 1937
- Barangays: 32 (see Barangays)

Government
  - Type: Sangguniang Bayan
  - Mayor: Melanie B. Abarientos-Garcia
  - Vice Mayor: Florencia G. Bargo
  - Representative: Tsuyoshi Anthony G. Horibata
  - Municipal Council: Members: Carlito A. Bocago; Isidro M. Magcawas; Aaron L. Malinao; Eduardo C. Uy Jr.; Francisco D. Verceluz; Augusto R. Adulta Jr.; Emma Q. Jorvina; Arnel T. Verdejo
  - Electorate: 18,821 voters (2025)

Area
  - Total: 208.31 km^{2} (80.43 sq mi)
- Highest elevation: 1,499 m (4,918 ft)
- Lowest elevation: 0 m (0 ft)

Population (2024 census)
  - Total: 26,029
  - Density: 124.95/km^{2} (323.63/sq mi)
  - Households: 6,104

Economy
  - Income class: 3rd municipal income class
  - Poverty incidence: 29.68% (2023)
  - Revenue: ₱ 214.7 million (2024)
  - Assets: ₱ 892.4 million (2024)
  - Expenditure: ₱ 157.5 million (2024)
  - Liabilities: ₱ 190.2 million (2024)

Service provider
  - Electricity: Quezon 1 Electric Cooperative (QUEZELCO 1)
- Time zone: UTC+8 (PST)
- ZIP code: 4411
- PSGC: 0501712000
- IDD : area code: +63 (0)54
- Native languages: Central Bikol; Tagalog
- Website: www.delgallego.gov.ph

Del Gallego, officially the Municipality of Del Gallego (Central Bikol: Banwaan kan Del Gallego; Tagalog: Bayan ng Del Gallego), is a municipality in the province of Camarines Sur, Philippines. According to the 2024 census, it has a population of 26,029 people.

== History ==
It is used to be called Danawin and located along Kilbay River (now Sabang River). It was established through Executive Order No. 56 Series of 1936 signed by then President Manuel L. Quezon.

== Geography ==
Del Gallego is the last town in the northwestern part of Camarines Sur. This is where the Quirino Highway (Andaya Highway) road meets with the first town of Quezon, Tagkawayan. It is 109 kilometres (68 mi) from Pili and 287 kilometres (178 mi) from Manila.

=== Barangays ===
Del Gallego is politically subdivided into 32 barangays (villages). Each barangay consists of puroks and some have sitios.

- Bagong Silang
- Bucal
- Cabasag
- Comadaycaday
- Comadogcadog
- Domagondong
- Kinalangan
- Mabini
- Magais I
- Magais II
- Mansalaya
- Nagkalit
- Palaspas
- Pamplona
- Pasay
- Pinagdapian
- Pinugusan
- Poblacion Zone III
- Sabang
- Salvacion
- San Juan
- San Pablo
- Santa Rita I
- Santa Rita II
- Sinagawsawan
- Sinuknipan I
- Sinuknipan II
- Sugsugin
- Tabion
- Tomagoktok
- Zone I Fátima
- Zone II San Antonio

=== Climate ===
Climate data for Del Gallego, Camarines Sur
Month	Jan	Feb	Mar	Apr	May	Jun	Jul	Aug	Sep	Oct	Nov	Dec	Year
Mean daily maximum °C (°F)	32 (90)	31 (88)	35 (95)	37 (99)	37 (99)	35 (95)	34 (93)	34 (93)	34 (93)	33 (91)	32 (90)	31 (88)	34 (93)
Mean daily minimum °C (°F)	26 (79)	26 (79)	28 (82)	30 (86)	31 (88)	30 (86)	29 (84)	29 (84)	29 (84)	29 (84)	28 (82)	27 (81)	29 (83)
Average precipitation mm (inches)	104.02 (4.10)	52.53 (2.07)	60.67 (2.39)	95.79 (3.77)	337.51 (13.29)	344.38 (13.56)	258.12 (10.16)	169.08 (6.66)	242.35 (9.54)	268.86 (10.59)	113.40 (4.46)	303.9 (11.96)	2,350.61 (92.55)
Average rainy days	24	24	23	24	26	30	31	28	28	28	28	30	324
Source: World Weather Online (modeled/calculated data, not measured locally)

== Demographics ==
Population census of Del Gallego
Year	Pop.	±% p.a.
1939	4,883	—
1948	9,915	+8.19%
1960	11,820	+1.48%
1970	12,664	+0.69%
1975	13,754	+1.67%
1980	13,476	−0.41%
1990	17,047	+2.38%
1995	18,760	+1.81%
2000	20,456	+1.87%
2007	21,272	+0.54%
2010	23,064	+2.99%
2015	25,397	+1.85%
2020	26,403	+0.82%
2024	26,029	−0.34%
Source: Philippine Statistics Authority

In the 2024 census, the population of Del Gallego was 26,029 people, with a density of 120 inhabitants per square kilometre or 310 inhabitants per square mile.

== Economy ==
Poverty incidence of Del Gallego (%)

Source: Philippine Statistics Authority

== Transportation ==
The municipality is connected with Manila by the Andaya Highway and daily rail services to and from Naga and Legazpi are provided by the Philippine National Railways.

In order to spur development in the municipality, the Toll Regulatory Board declared Toll Road 5 the extension of the South Luzon Expressway. A 420-kilometer, four lane expressway starting from the terminal point of the now under construction SLEX Toll Road 4 at Barangay Mayao, Lucena, Quezon to Matnog, Sorsogon, near the Matnog Ferry Terminal. On August 25, 2020, San Miguel Corporation announced that they will invest the project which will reduce travel time from Lucena to Matnog from 9 hours to 5.5 hours.

Another expressway that will serve Del Gallego is the Quezon-Bicol Expressway (QuBEx), which will link between Lucena and San Fernando, Camarines Sur.

== Education ==
The Del Gallego Schools District Office governs all educational institutions within the municipality. It oversees the management and operations of all private and public, from primary to secondary schools.

Del Gallego has a total of 23 schools, twenty of which are public schools and the other three are private schools.

=== Primary and elementary schools ===
- Bagong Silang Elementary School (est. 1988)
- Cabasag Elementary School (est. 1986)
- Del Gallego Central School (est. 1937)
- Kinalangan Elementary School (est. 1952)
- Magais Elementary School (est. 1964)
- Mansalaya Elementary School
- Palaspas Elementary School (est. 1957)
- Pamplona Community School
- Pasay Elementary School
- Sabang Elementary School (est. 1945)
- Salvación Elementary School
- San Juan Elementary School
- San Pablo Community School
- Santa Rita Elementary School (est. 1948)
- Sinuknipan Elementary School (est. 1947)
- Tabion Elementary School (est. 1993)

=== Secondary schools ===
- Del Gallego Community College (est. 2024)
- Del Gallego National High School (est. 1969)
- Mansalaya National High School (est. 1996)
- Sinuknipan National High School (est. 1966)

=== Higher educational institutions ===
- Alfelor Sr. Memorial College (est. 1985)
- Colegio de Santa Rita Camarines Sur Foundation (est. 1995)
- SPJ International Technology Institute (est. 2013)

== Churches ==
- Santa Rita de Cascia Parish - Poblacion (est. 1937)
- Nuestra Señora de Peñafrancia Parish - Sinuknipan I (est. 2010)

== Gallery ==
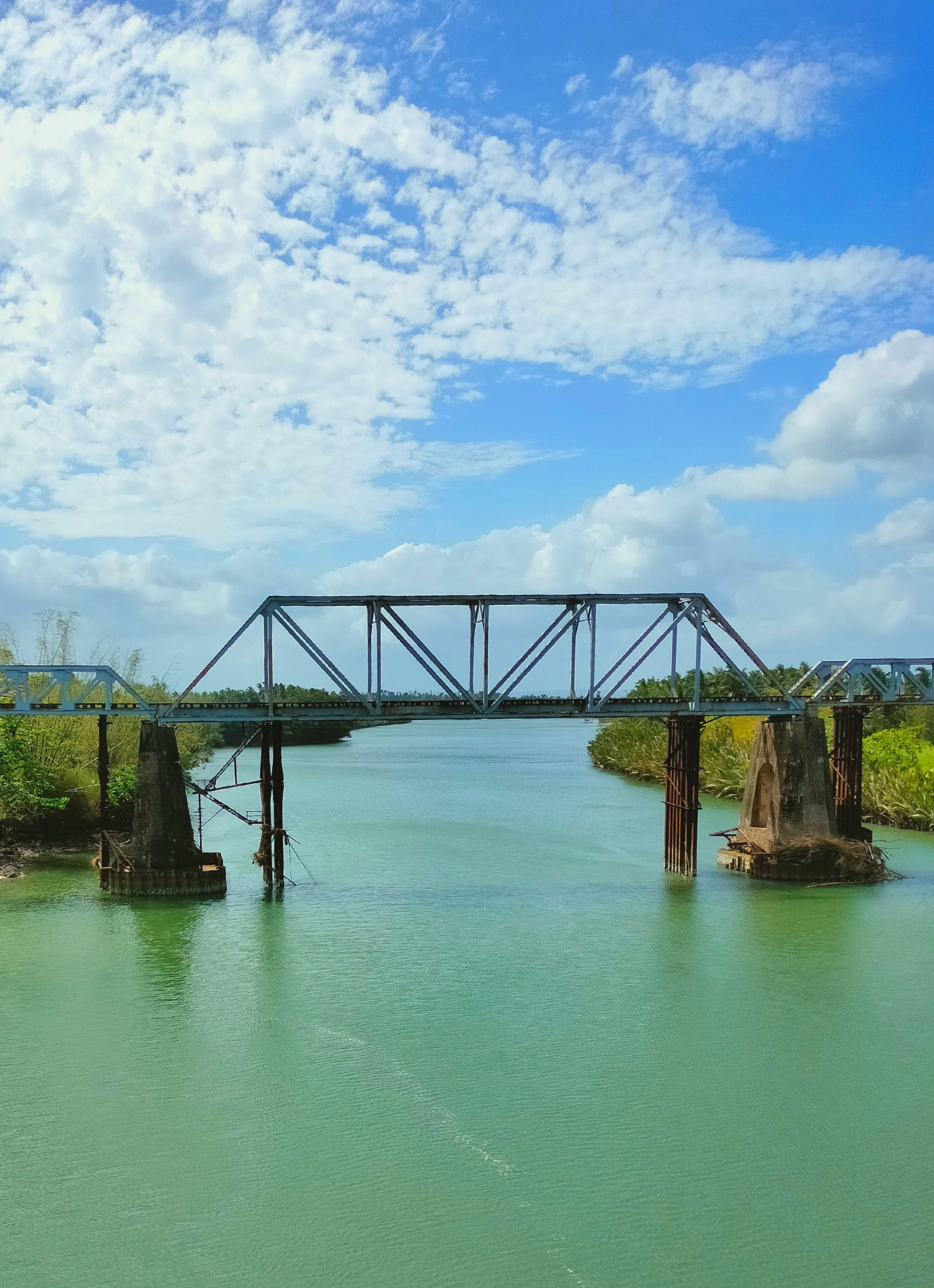
Kilbay Bridge

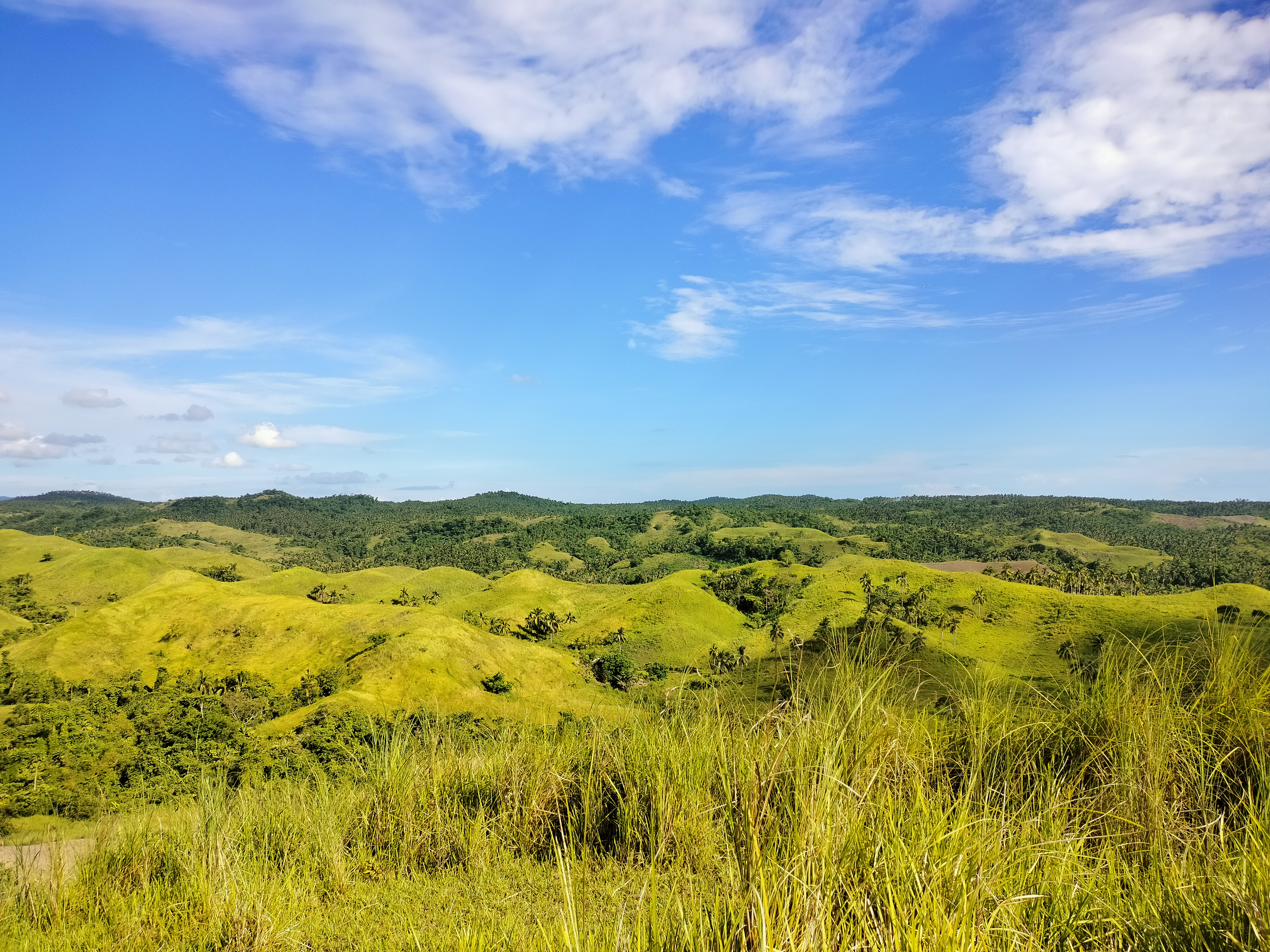
Tabion Hills

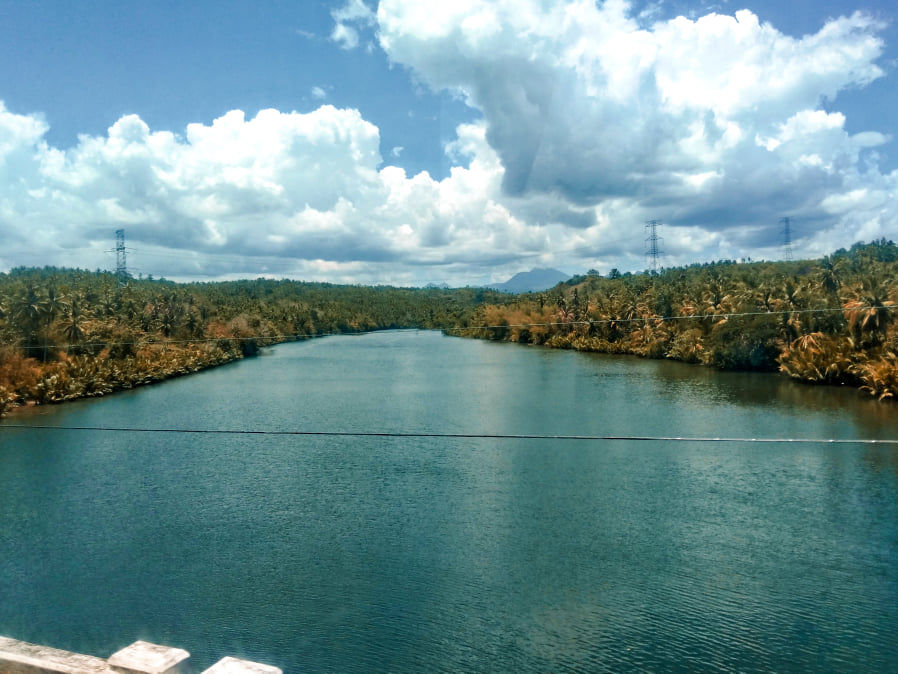
Kilbay or Sabang River

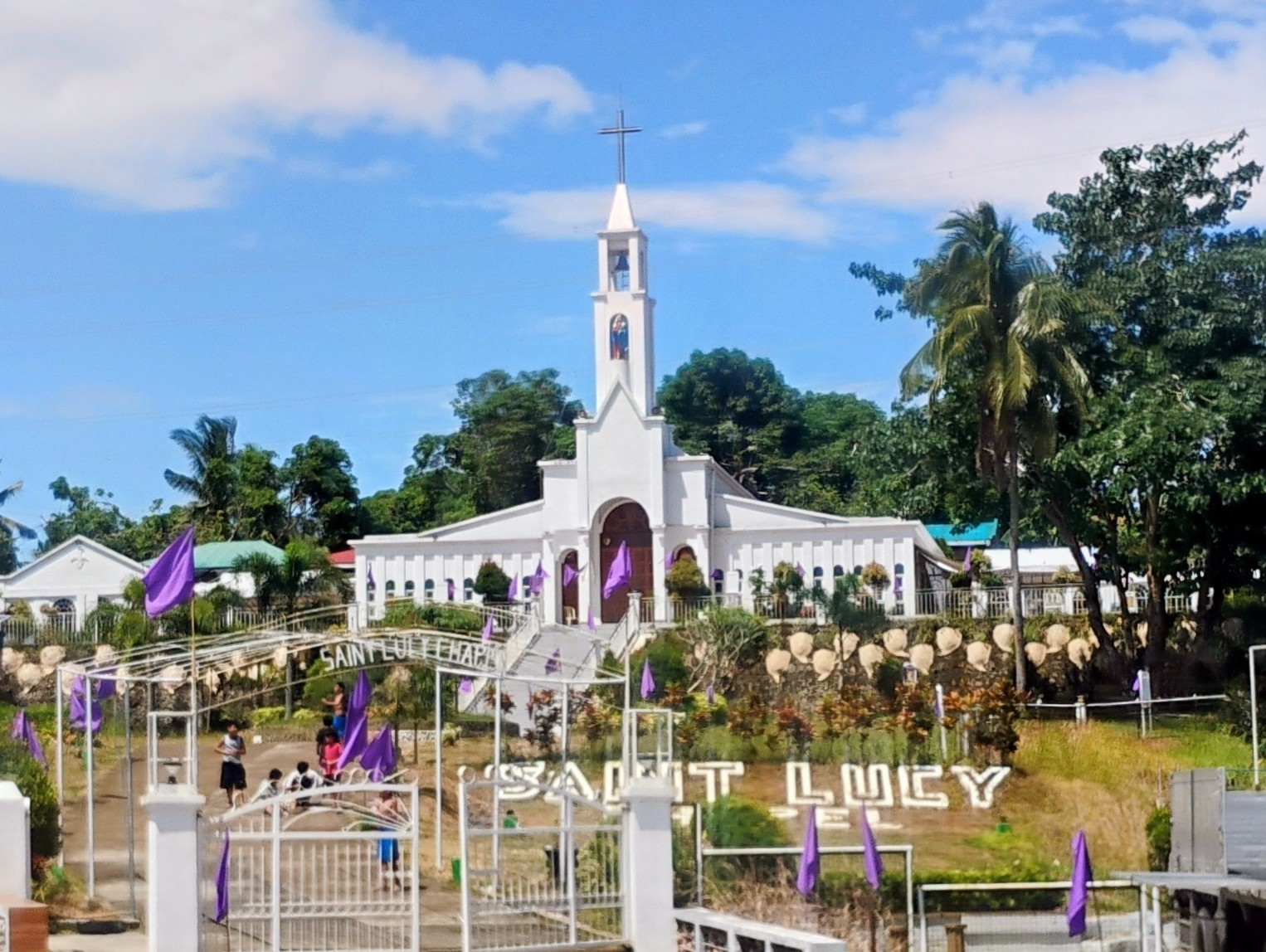
Saint Lucy Chapel
