= Sipocot =

Municipality in Camarines Sur, Philippines

- Municipality
- Municipality of Sipocot
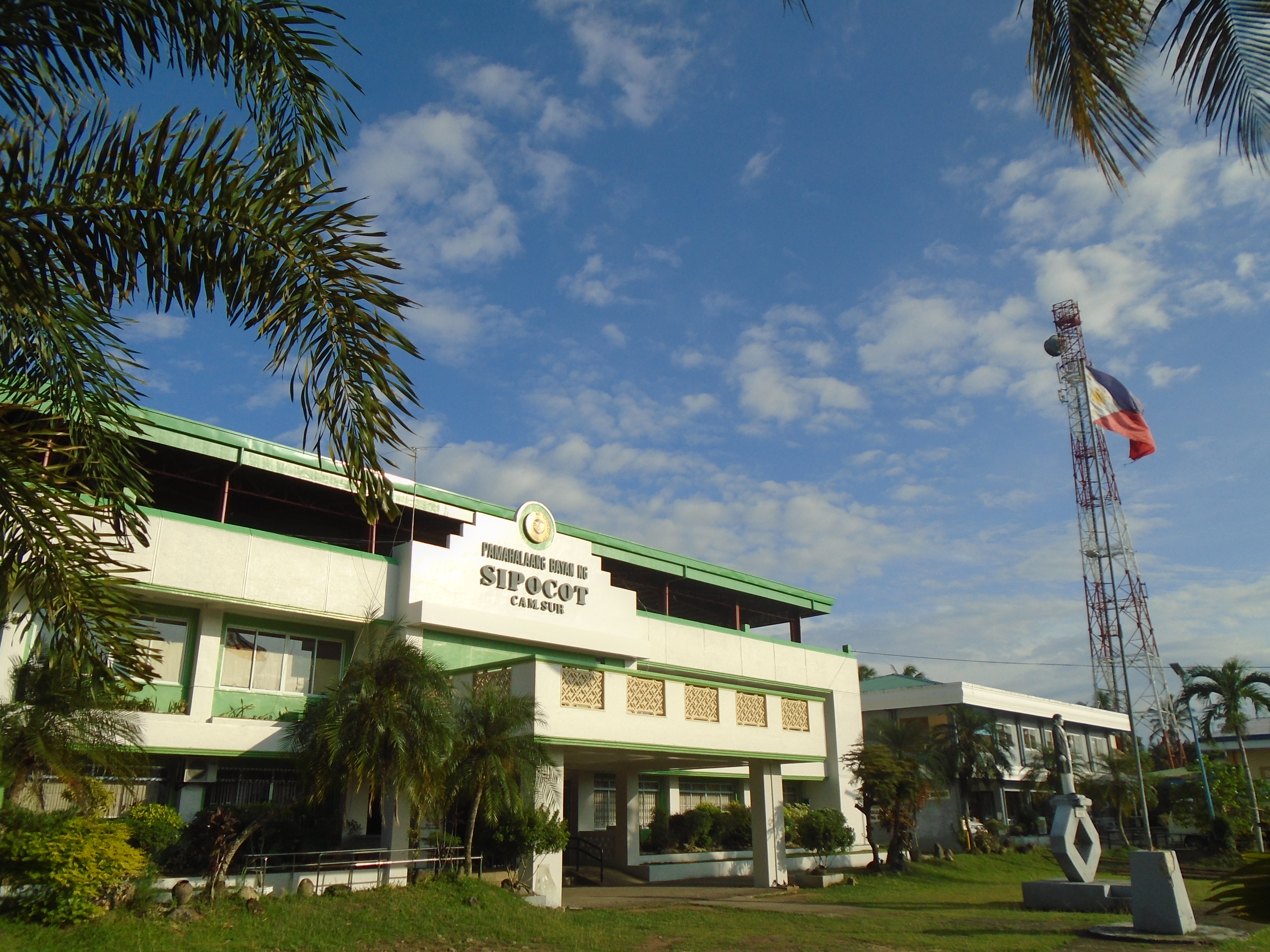
- The Municipal Hall of the Local Government Unit of Sipocot, Camarines Sur

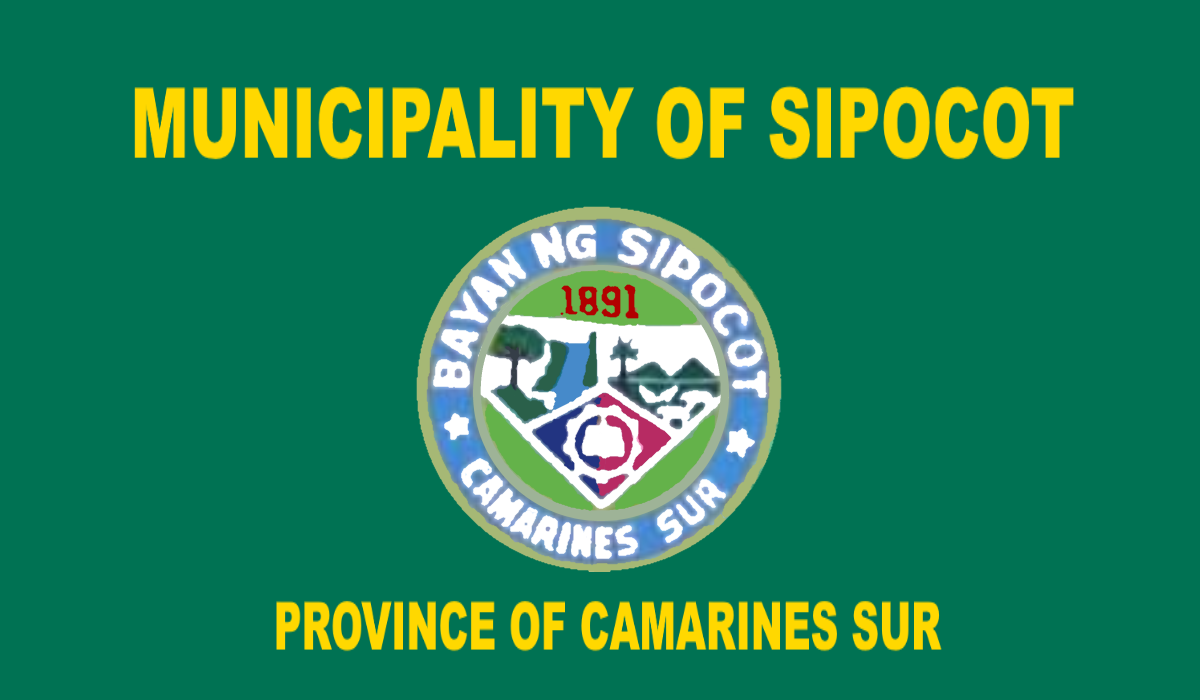
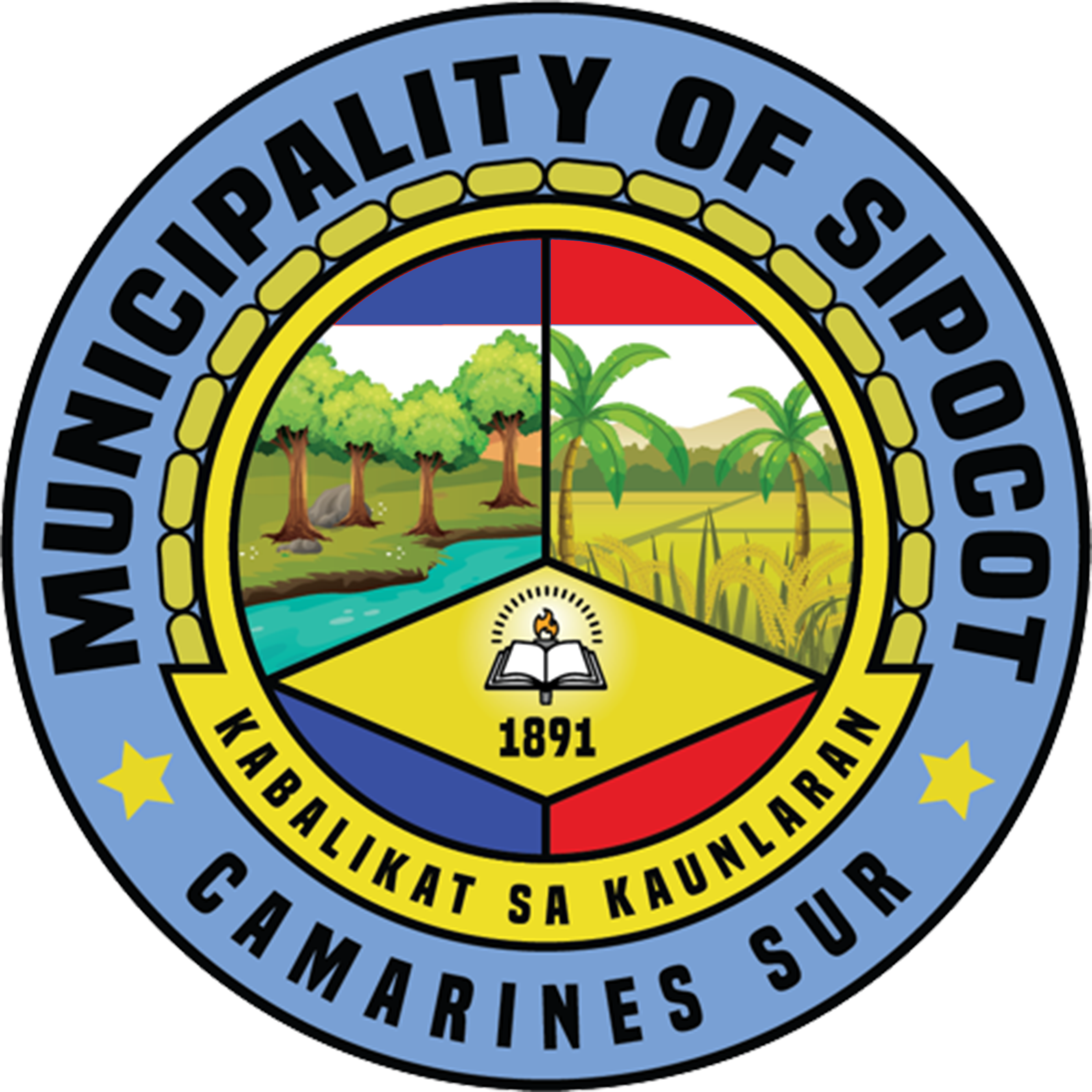
- Flag Seal
- Nicknames: Egg Basket of Camarines Sur; Native Chicken Capital of Camarines Sur
- Motto: "Efficiency and Integrity towards Excellence"
- Map of Camarines Sur with Sipocot highlighted
- Interactive map of Sipocot
- Location within the Philippines
- Coordinates: 13°46′03″N 122°58′42″E
- Country: Philippines
- Region: Bicol Region
- Province: Camarines Sur
- District: 1st district
- Founded: July 3, 1801
- Barangays: 46 (see Barangays)

Government
  - Type: Sangguniang Bayan
  - Mayor: Hon. Tomas A. Bocago
  - Vice Mayor: Hon. Rogenor Astor
  - Representative: Hon. Tsuyoshi Anthony Horibata
  - Municipal Council: Members: Hon. Atty. Don Daryl Abergos; Hon. Robell Astor; Hon. Hernan Nieva; Hon. Jezreen Cañete; Hon. Maria Olympia Bailey; Hon. Joby Alemania; Hon. Atty. Francisco Veras; Hon. Daryl Dumpit; Hon. Rolando Añon, ABC President; Hon. Kimberly Toledo, SK Federation President
  - Electorate: 44,867 voters (2025)

Area
  - Total: 243.43 km^{2} (93.99 sq mi)
- Elevation: 69 m (226 ft)
- Highest elevation: 267 m (876 ft)
- Lowest elevation: 8 m (26 ft)

Population (2024 census)
  - Total: 65,286
  - Density: 268.19/km^{2} (694.61/sq mi)
  - Households: 15,678

Economy
  - Income class: 1st municipal income class
  - Poverty incidence: 26.49% (2023)
  - Revenue: ₱ 295 million (2024)
  - Assets: ₱ 745.7 million (2024)
  - Expenditure: ₱ 242 million (2024)
  - Liabilities: ₱ 121.6 million (2024)

Service provider
  - Electricity: Camarines Sur 1 Electric Cooperative (CASURECO 1)
- Time zone: UTC+8 (PST)
- ZIP code: 4408
- PSGC: 0501734000
- IDD : area code: +63 (0)54
- Native languages: Central Bikol; Tagalog
- Website: www.sipocot.gov.ph

Sipocot, officially the Municipality of Sipocot (Central Bikol: Banwaan kan Sipocot; Tagalog: Bayan ng Sipocot), is a municipality in the province of Camarines Sur, in the Bicol Region of the Philippines. According to the 2024 census, it has a population of 65,286 people.

It is one of the most populous municipalities in the province and plays a significant role in the socio-economic development of northern Camarines Sur.

== History ==
=== Pre-colonial period ===
In the early decades of 20th century, archaeological studies conducted between the Sipocot and Libmanan area netted Chinese funereal artifacts of either 14th or 15th century origin. The historical finds suggest that the area belonged to one of the oldest habitational and thickly populated sites long before the arrival of the Spaniards. In fact, small cluster of villages within the jurisdiction of Sipocot had been in existence when the initial group of Spanish encomenderos penetrated the region. These villages, which now comprise Sipocot, were Sacalacvangan (Calagbangan), Caanip (Anib), Cabilindi (Hindi), and Caysian (Taisan), among others.

=== Spanish colonial period ===
Early on, due to its remote and almost inaccessible location, Sipocot lagged behind Libmanan and Lupi in its progression as pueblo. Sipocot first appeared in the Spanish charts as a visita or barrio of Lupi, which seceded from Libmanan and became an independent parish in 1726.

However, because of the need for regular spiritual service and access to colonial institution, church and local government, the local residents clamored for Sipocot to be accorded township. At that time, the distant town of Lupi was the nearest seat of government and church, which can be reached solely by trekking rugged mountain trails. Finally, on June 3, 1801, by virtue of the proclamation issued by Governor-General Rafael Maria de Aguilar, Sipocot became a Pueblo and a Franciscan curacy. However, in spite of its upgraded status as pueblo, Sipocot was slow to develop and remained outside the edge of regional affairs throughout the rest of the Spanish regime. The lethargic development of Sipocot can be attributed to its location which is beyond the mainstream of colonial commerce, and to the time when it was created as a pueblo which was considered late in the colonial timeline. In fact, Sipocot was one of the last few towns to be created in the Bicol Region during the Spanish regime.

=== Philippine Revolution; American colonial period ===
The Philippine Revolution against the Spanish regime in 1896 gave birth to the revolutionary government of Sipocot headed by Capitan Mariano de los Santos as its Presidente Municipal. However, after the Filipino-American War, Mariano de los Santos was appointed as Municipal President of Sipocot in 1901 by the Philippine Commission. From 1905 up to the Commonwealth Period that lasted until 1942, all Municipal Presidents of Sipocot were duly elected by popular vote. Although the American Regime lasted only for a little over forty years, it provided significant contribution in the establishment in Sipocot of secular and free public school; expansion of bureaucratic agencies, which gave young professionals employment opportunities in the government; setting up of civil government and democratic reforms; and utilization of natural resources for economic enterprise and investment.

=== Japanese occupation ===
The Japanese occupation of Sipocot happened on December 19, 1941, when a battalion of Japanese soldiers from Legazpi reached the municipality. They established weapons depot in Impig, a garrison in Malubago, and a main garrison consisting of several houses in the Poblacion which served as lodging for their troops.

Because the Japanese were at first friendly and diplomatic, the residents of Sipocot, unlike the people in other municipalities, were less aggressive to the Japanese, and in fact, they established rapport with them. For that reason, the Japanese were able to persuade a number of local officials to serve under their rule; thus, the local government of Sipocot functioned during war time.

However, when the guerrilla resistance movements in the area intensified their military operations and ambuscades against the invading troops, the Japanese resorted to coercive and violent means to instil discipline and cooperation on the local residents. The Japanese commandeered public and private properties and buildings for their military needs. School buildings and campuses were used as military quarters, which caused the suspension of classes. They enslaved transient male travelers to work in their public works projects without pay and under duress. Apart from these harsh impositions was the infamy the municipality got as it came to be known as “Little Tokyo”, a place where Japanese troops indulged in short carnal relaxation whenever they stopped by Sipocot from Naga on their way to the northern part of the country. However, in fairness to the Japanese forces, aside from the reported tortures and killings in the municipality of guerrillas captured from neighboring municipalities, reports of atrocities committed by the Japanese in Sipocot were surprisingly rare.

On the other hand, during their short-lived occupation of Sipocot the Japanese gave some positive contributions to the municipality in the field of public works. Japanese engineers rebuilt the Sipocot Bridge. They also repaired the railroad tracks situated in Sipocot that connected Legazpi to Manila.

However, it was widely believed that these projects were undertaken not for the benefit of the local population but to consolidate Japanese control of the region and facilitate troop mobility.

On the morning of April 28, 1944, eight trucks of American soldiers arrived in Sipocot and liberated the town from the Japanese forces.

At the end of the Second World War, Sipocot was quick to recover since it suffered no significant human casualties and only minimal loss of properties considering that it was spared from bombardment and no major battle was fought in the municipality. Besides said good fortune, the convergence of other factors influenced the gradual but sustained development of Sipocot, such as the shift in the mode of transportation from water to land; the booming economy of the United States and the development of the local construction industry; and, the election of Mayor Pablo Salazar as its post war Municipal Mayor.

At the turn of the century, the shift in the mode of travel from water to land gave rise to rail road systems and road networks that crisscrossed the territorial domain of Sipocot, making it the central transit point in the first district of the province as well as major conduit to various destinations in the northern and southern portions of Luzon.

As the American economy grew before World War II, the need for timber to sustain its growth placed the forest resources of Camarines Sur and Camarines Norte at the fore front of American investment in the region. Sipocot, which had an abundant forest resources whose potentials have been long ignored, became haven for logging companies which provided employment to local residents as well as migrants. Later, as the local construction industry boomed, particularly the extension of the railway system to the whole Bicol Region, the logging industry in Sipocot progressed even more. At the height of its commercial success, the logging industry in Sipocot has at least five (5) sawmills employing hundreds of workers and producing a combined average output of 150,000 board feet of daily. In the 1950s, with its income of least P35,000.00 annually, mostly derived from logging industry, Sipocot was reclassified into second class municipality from its previous fourth class municipality classification before the war.

=== Third Republic ===
The post war municipal mayor of Sipocot, Mayor Salazar, was a progressive-minded leader. He enticed many people from other municipalities and provinces as far as the Tagalog Region with a promise of five-hectare fertile and cultivatable public land for every family who will come and settle in Sipocot. The migrants who came and settled in Sipocot not only converted the forest spaces of the municipality into farm lots and residential areas, but they contributed to the rapid population growth of the municipality. From 7,936 inhabitants, based on the 1946 census, the population of Sipocot grew to 32,650, as per 1960 census. In the same year, Sipocot became the sixth most populous town of the province of Camarines Sur.

=== Marcos presidency ===
On April 11, 1984, Vice Mayor Rosita Villafuerte was assassinated at a United Nationalist Democratic Organization (UNIDO) campaign rally in Barangay Manlubang. Five gunmen had reportedly shot Villafuerte in the back of her head after she gave a speech campaigning for her brother-in-law Luis Villafuerte, an independent candidate for reelection in the Batasang Pambansa election; a barangay captain and an audience member in the rally also died from the assailants' gunfire. Prior to the incident, she was reported to have been able to convince 43 of Sipocot's 46 barangay captains to switch from the Marcos administration's party Kilusang Bagong Lipunan to UNIDO, with her family receiving death threats during the campaign. Although the military placed the blame on communist rebels from the New People's Army for Villafuerte's assassination, residents of Manlubang disagreed with the analysis.

Today, from its beginnings as a visita or barrio of Lupi during the Spanish regime, Sipocot has become a municipality with the total population of 68,169, as per 2020 census, meaning it is the 8th largest in 35 towns, inhabiting its 24,129 hectares territorial domain. Moreover, Sipocot is now the most populous and progressive municipality in the 1st District of Camarines Sur.

== Geography ==
Strategically located at the northern part of Camarines Sur, Sipocot serves as a vital gateway between the provinces of Camarines Norte and Camarines Sur. It lies along the Maharlika Highway (Asian Highway 26), a major arterial road that connects the Bicol Region to Metro Manila and other parts of Luzon, making Sipocot a central transit point for trade, travel, and commerce. The municipality is approximately 38 kilometers from Naga City, the region’s commercial and cultural center, and about 280 kilometers from Metro Manila.

Sipocot spans a total land area of approximately 218.60 square kilometers, making it one of the larger municipalities in Camarines Sur in terms of land size. Its topography is a mix of coastal plains, rolling hills, and forested uplands, with various rivers and streams contributing to the local ecosystem and agriculture. The climate is characterized by a tropical rainforest climate (Af), with substantial rainfall throughout the year, supporting a variety of crops and natural resources.

Sipocot is politically subdivided into 44 barangays, which serve as the smallest administrative units. Each barangay plays a crucial role in delivering basic government services and fostering community development. The municipal government is headed by a mayor, vice mayor, and a municipal council in accordance with the Philippine Local Government Code.

Notable hills include:

- Susong Daraga Hill at Barangay Impig and is near at CBSUA-Sipocot campus
- Overlooking Point at Barangay Manangle located on the left side towards Manila at the Quirino Highway
- Hundred Steps at Barangay Impig
- Friendship Mountain at Barangay Impig

=== Barangays ===
Sipocot is politically subdivided into 46 barangays. Each barangay consists of puroks and some have sitios.

- Aldezary
- Alteza
- Anib
- Awayan
- Azucena
- Bagong Sirang
- Binahian
- Bolo Norte
- Bolo Sur
- Bulan
- Bulawan
- Cabuyao
- Caima
- Calagbangan
- Calampinay
- Carayrayan
- Cotmo
- Gabi
- Gaongan
- Impig
- Lipilip
- Lubigan Jr.
- Lubigan Sr.
- Malaguico
- Malubago
- Manangle
- Mangapo
- Mangga
- Manlubang
- Mantila
- North Centro
- North Villazar
- Sagrada Familia
- Salanda
- Salvacion
- San Isidro
- San Vicente
- Serranzana
- South Centro
- South Villazar
- Taisan
- Tara
- Tible
- Tula-tula
- Vigaan
- Yabo

=== Climate ===
Climate data for Sipocot, Camarines Sur
Month	Jan	Feb	Mar	Apr	May	Jun	Jul	Aug	Sep	Oct	Nov	Dec	Year
Mean daily maximum °C (°F)	32 (90)	31 (88)	35 (95)	37 (99)	37 (99)	36 (97)	35 (95)	33 (91)	34 (93)	33 (91)	31 (88)	31 (88)	34 (93)
Mean daily minimum °C (°F)	27 (81)	27 (81)	29 (84)	31 (88)	32 (90)	31 (88)	30 (86)	30 (86)	30 (86)	29 (84)	28 (82)	28 (82)	29 (85)
Average precipitation mm (inches)	59.21 (2.33)	66.36 (2.61)	58.1 (2.29)	62.92 (2.48)	110.94 (4.37)	206.81 (8.14)	254.59 (10.02)	141.12 (5.56)	156.51 (6.16)	290.68 (11.44)	113.40 (4.46)	368.1 (14.49)	1,888.74 (74.35)
Average rainy days	22	23	19	22	25	28	31	27	25	28	27	31	308
Source: World Weather Online (modeled/calculated data, not measured locally)

== Government ==
Municipal presidents and mayors of Sipocot (1901–present)

1. Hon. Mariano de los Santos (President, 1901–1903, American Government Appointed)
2. Hon. Eleuterio Serranzana (President, 1903–1905, American Government Appointed; 1905–1907, American Civil Commission Elected)
3. Hon. Erasmo Mirate (President, American Civil Commission Elected)
4. Hon. Faustino Fabricante (President, 1907–1910, American Civil Commission Elected)
5. Hon. Damaso Faragas (President, 1910–1913, American Civil Commission Elected)
6. Hon. Manuel Midem (President, 1916–1919, Jones Law Government Elected)
7. Hon. Gregorio de Guzman (President, 1919–1922, Jones Law Government Elected)
8. Hon. Miguel Midem (President, 1922–1923, Jones Law Government Elected)
9. Hon. Juliano Miranda (President, 1923–1925, by succession upon death of Hon. Miguel Midem)
10. Hon. Rufino Serranza (President, 1925–1928, Jones Law Government Elected)
11. Hon. Feliciano Septimo (President, 1928–1931, Jones Law Government Elected)
12. Hon. Paulino Castilla (President, 1931–1934, Jones Law Government Elected)
13. Hon. Pablo Salazar (Mayor, 1934–1942, Commonwealth Government Elected)
14. Hon. Justo Midem (Mayor, 1942–1944, Japanese Government Elected)
15. Hon. Pablo Salazar (Mayor, 1945–1946, Philippine Civil Affairs Unit)
16. Hon. Paulino Castilla (Mayor, 1946–1951, Philippine Republic Appointed)
17. Hon. Pablo Salazar (Mayor, 1952–1959, Philippine Republic Elected – 2 Terms)
18. Hon. Jaime Avengoza (Mayor, 1960–1971, Philippine Republic Appointed – 3 Terms)
19. Hon. Paulino Castilla (Mayor, 1972–June 28, 1976, assumed office as Mayor and extended under Martial Law)
20. Hon. Jaime Avengoza (Mayor, June 28, 1976 – March 31, 1979, assumed office as per Supreme Court Order declaring Him as winner in 1971 local elections – 4 Terms)
21. Hon. Fidel A. Palmero (OIC Mayor, April 1, 1979 under Martial Law to March 2, 1980 – Appointed)
22. Hon. Jaime Avengoza (Mayor, March 3, 1980 – 1986, First elected mayor under Martial Law – 5th Term)
23. Hon. Elueteria R. Gaor (Mayor, January 1–June 5, 1986, by succession upon death of Hon. J. Avengoza, Appointed)
24. Hon. Francisco Veras (OIC Mayor, June 6, 1986 – November 30, 1987, Appointed)
25. Hon. Ernesto Gonzales (OIC Mayor, December 2, 1987 – February 2, 1988 at 2:00 pm, Appointed)
26. Hon. Francisco Veras (Mayor, February 2, 1988 at 12:00 noon to June 30, 1992 at 12:00 noon, First Elected Mayor after the February 1986 People’s Power Revolution)
27. Hon. Salvador Avengoza (Mayor, June 30, 1992 at 12:00 noon to June 30, 2001)
28. Hon. Theresa dela Peña (Mayor, June 30, 2001 – June 30, 2010)
29. Hon. Rogenor Astor (Mayor, 2010–June 2019, 3 Terms)
30. Hon. Tomas Bocago (Mayor, July 2019–present)

== Churches ==
Churches in Sipocot, Camarines Sur

- San Juan Bautista Parish - Poblacion (est.1801)
- San Pío X Parish - North Villazar (est.1956)
- San Antonio de Padua Parish - Binahian (est.2002)
- Santa Teresa de Lisieux Parish - Tara (est.2003)
- Santo Niño de Praga Parish - Calagbangan (est.2016)

== Demographics ==
Population census of Sipocot

Year	Pop.	±% p.a.
1903	2,925	—
1918	2,736	−0.44%
1939	7,936	+5.20%
1948	18,089	+9.59%
1960	32,650	+5.04%
1970	38,153	+1.57%
1975	39,457	+0.68%
1980	43,505	+1.97%

Year	Pop.	±% p.a.
1990	49,501	+1.30%
1995	53,392	+1.43%
2000	56,576	+1.25%
2007	57,861	+0.31%
2010	64,042	+3.76%
2015	64,855	+0.24%
2020	68,169	+1.05%
2024	65,286	−1.03%

Source: Philippine Statistics Authority

In the 2024 census, the population of Sipocot was 65,286 people, with a density of 270 inhabitants per square kilometre or 700 inhabitants per square mile.

Sipocot has a steadily growing population according to charts.

== Economy ==
Poverty incidence of Sipocot (%)

Source: Philippine Statistics Authority

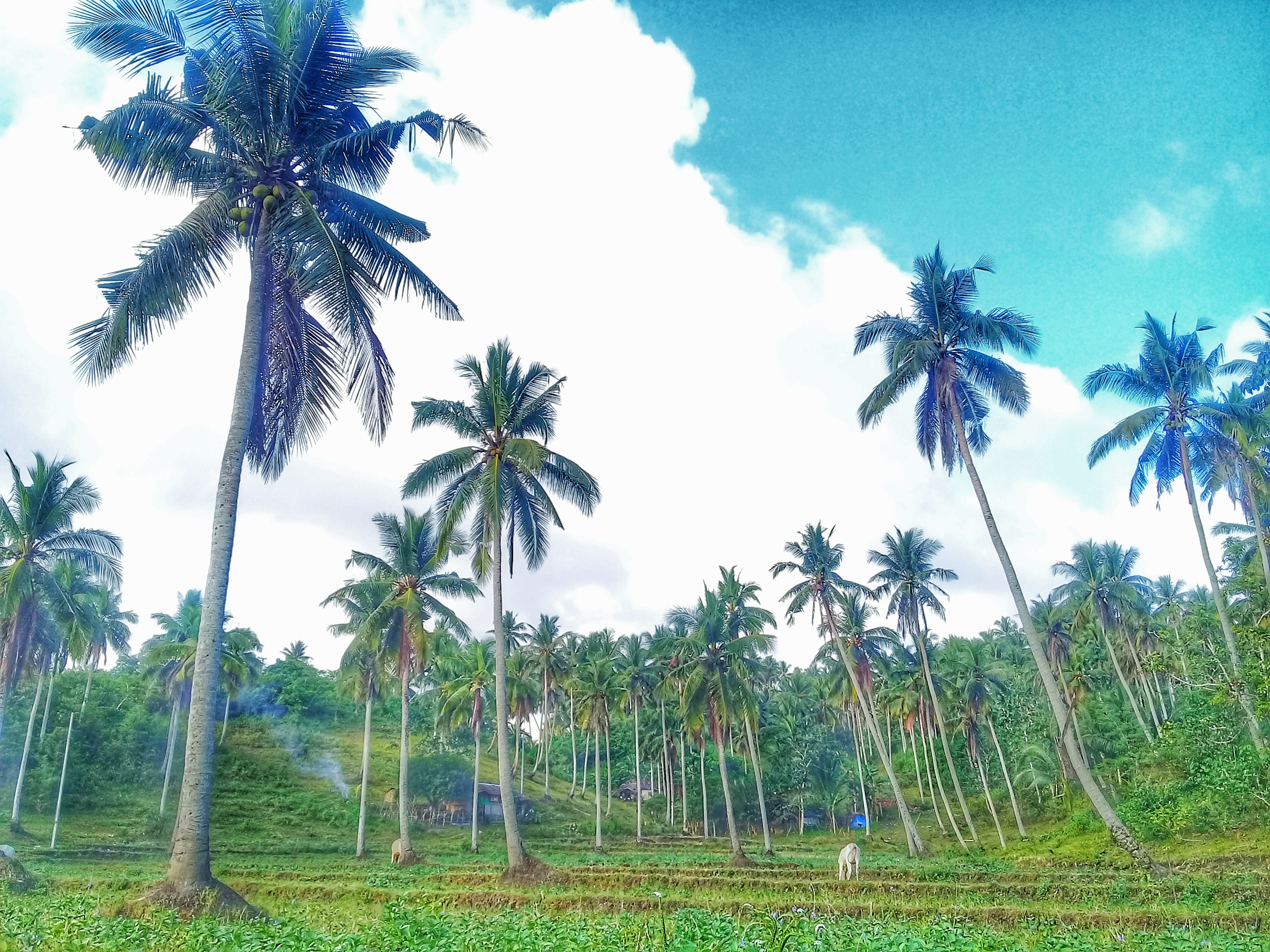
Coconut plantation in Sipocot

The local economy of Sipocot is primarily driven by agriculture, forestry, and small-scale industries. Major agricultural products include rice, coconut, corn, and root crops, while forest products such as timber and rattan are also harvested in the upland barangays. In recent years, the town has seen growth in commerce, education, and public services, with ongoing efforts to expand infrastructure and attract investment.

Businesses in Sipocot are tourism. One of the town's tourist spots, Susong Daraga Hill, is located in Barangay Impig, overlooking the downtown area or Centro.

Commercial businesses are heavily concentrated in the town proper. The commercial area stretches from Impig to North Centro to South Centro and to Barangay Tara. The CBD or Central Business District is located in the South Centro Area.

The Main market however is located in the North Centro. Back in the 1940s the 1st district of Camarines Sur's financial center was located in the municipality of Ragay. In 1987 the financial district was relocated to Sipocot. So the town grew rapidly and became at Par with the much larger areas of Daet, Calabanga, Pili, Iriga and Tagkawayan in Calabarzon.

In 2021, Sipocot had been qualified for cityhood and at present is pending.

=== Trade ===
Sipocot is located along the national highway and this made the town grow. Sipocot is considered the commercial center of Northwestern Camarines Sur because people from Del Gallego, Ragay, Lupi sell their products in the market particularly wood. People from Cabusao trade fish there while Pamplona and Libmanan trade agricultural products there such as rice and corn.

=== Vision 2035 ===
Mayor Tom Bocago has envisioned the municipality of Sipocot to be a city by the year 2035. He also envisioned that by that year the municipality's assets will reach over ₱1 billion and its poverty rate will be less than 15%.

== Culture ==
Sipocot reflects the vibrant heritage of the Bicolano people, with traditions rooted in Catholicism, local festivals, and regional cuisine. Among its notable events is the annual town fiesta celebrated in honor of its patron saint, which draws both local residents and visitors from nearby towns. Educational institutions in the municipality include public and private elementary and secondary schools, as well as satellite campuses of regional colleges, contributing to a gradually improving literacy rate.

With its blend of natural resources, strategic location, and growing population, Sipocot is regarded as a municipality with significant potential for development in the years to come. Continued investment in infrastructure, education, and local governance is expected to further enhance its role within the region and contribute to the broader development of Camarines Sur.

== Infrastructure ==
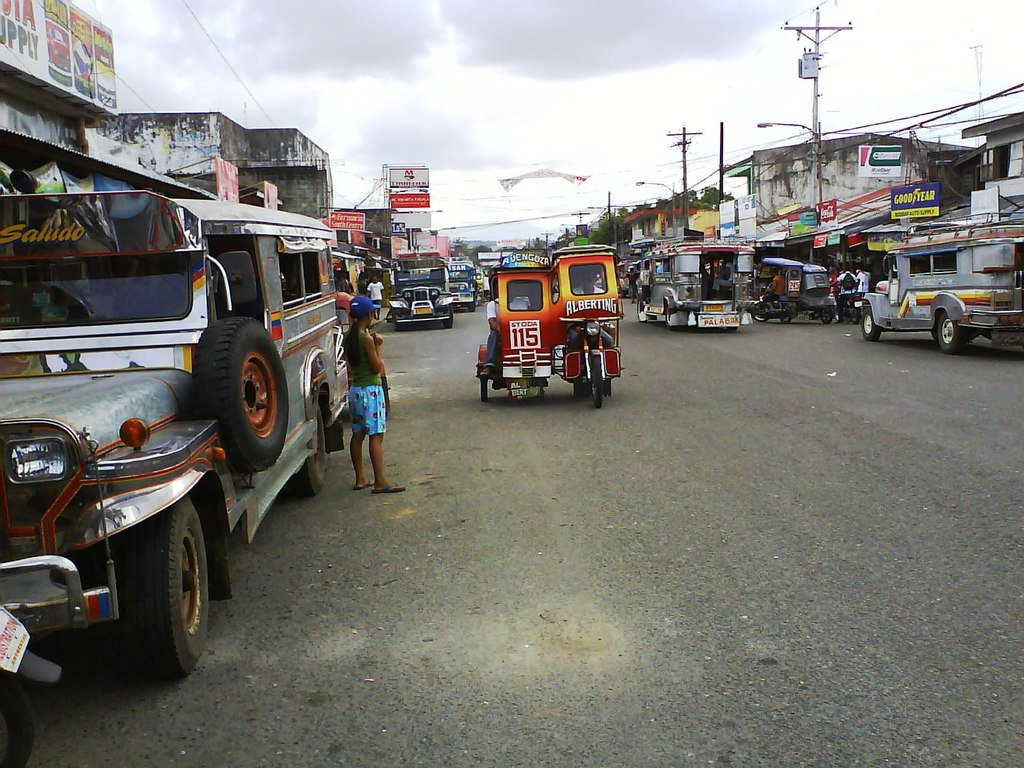
Poblacion area of Sipocot

=== Highways ===
The municipality is connected with Manila by the new Andaya Highway and daily rail services to and from Naga & Legazpi are provided by the Philippine National Railways.

In order to spur development in the municipality, The Toll Regulatory Board declared Toll Road 5 the extension of South Luzon Expressway. A 420-kilometer, four lane expressway starting from the terminal point of the now under construction SLEX Toll Road 4 at Barangay Mayao, Lucena City in Quezon to Matnog, Sorsogon, near the Matnog Ferry Terminal. On August 25, 2020, San Miguel Corporation announced that they will invest the project which will reduce travel time from Lucena to Matnog from 9 hours to 5.5 hours.

Another expressway that will serve Metro Naga is the Quezon-Bicol Expressway (QuBEx), which will link between Lucena and San Fernando, Camarines Sur.

=== Communications ===
- BayanTel and PLDT provide the telephone services including DSL, Broadband, and Dial-up internet services
- Using of Cellular phones is one of the important media of communication in the area, it is being powered by Dito Telecom, Smart Communications, Sun Cellular and Globe Telecom, (it also includes the Talk N Text, Touch Mobile, etc.)
- The municipality also have this Post Office located at the Municipal Compound with 4408 as the Zip Code.
- The area is accessible via buses, jeepneys, tricycles, trains, skates, etc. for public transportation vehicles.
- The cable TV is also available, it is being powered by Dream Satellite TV, Sky Cable and Cignal.

== Healthcare ==
=== Hospitals ===
- Sipocot District Hospital
- Our Lady of Salvation Hospital
- Rural Health Unit

=== Lying-in clinic ===
- Frydt Lying-In Clinic
- Ronjay Birthing Clinic (Brgy. Tara and Brgy. Calagbangan)

== Education ==
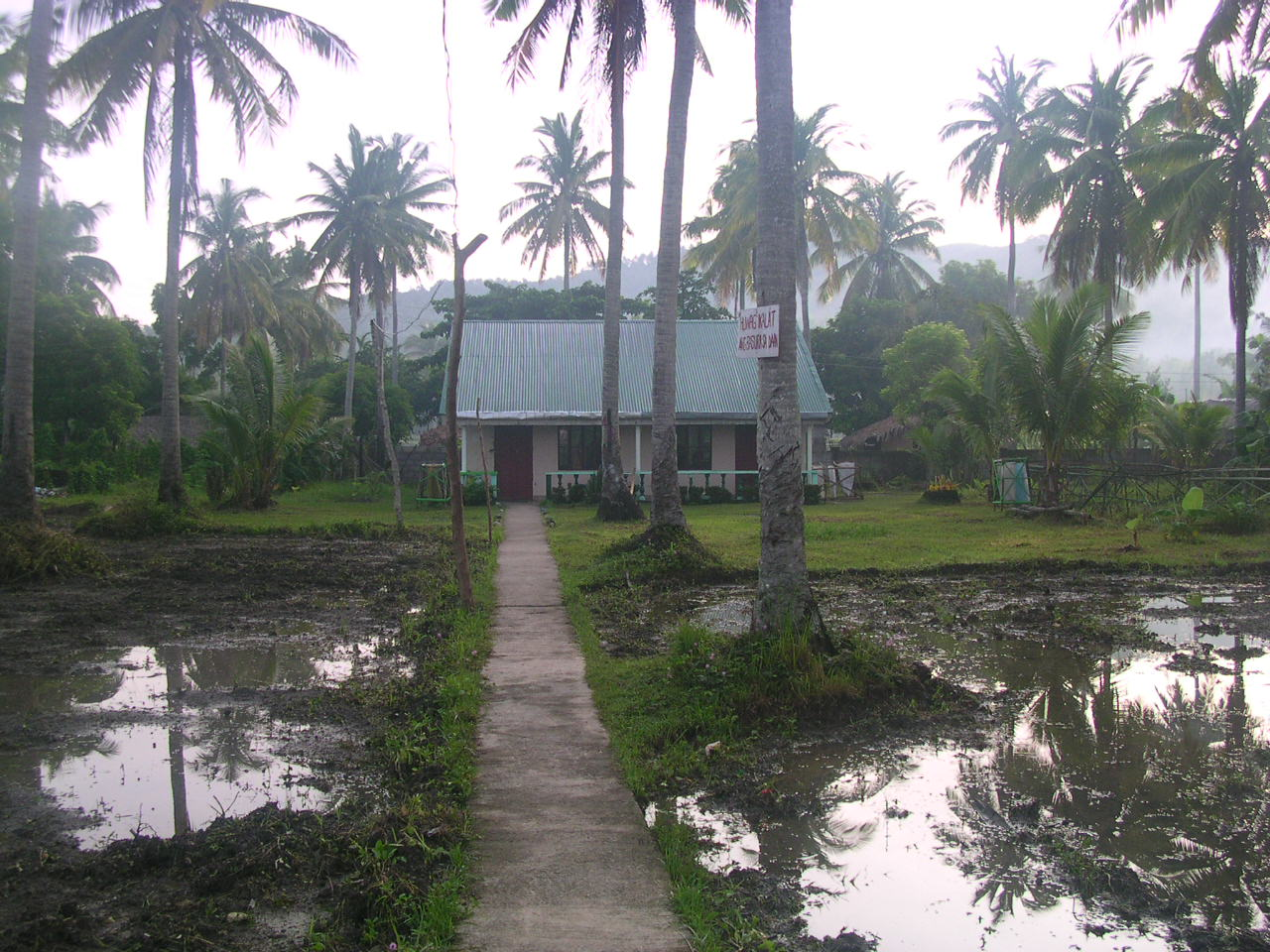
Binahian Elementary School

There are two schools district offices which govern all educational institutions within the municipality. They oversee the management and operations of all private and public, from primary to secondary schools. These are the:

- Sipocot North Schools District
- Sipocot South Schools District

=== Primary and elementary schools ===
- Aldezar Elementary School
- Alteza Elementary School
- Anib Elementary School
- Awayan Elementary School
- Azucena Elementary School
- Bagong Sirang Elementary School
- Binahian Elementary School
- Bocol Elementary School
- Bolo Sur Elementary School
- Bulan Elementary School
- Bulawan Elementary School
- Cabuyao Elementary School
- Caima Elementary School
- Calagbangan Elementary School
- Calampinay Elementary School
- Carayrayan Elementary School
- Christian Mission Service Philippines School
- Cotmo Elementary School
- Felix O. Alfelor Sr. Foundation College (Elementary Department)
- Gabi Elementary School
- Gaongan Elementary School
- King Thomas Learning Academy
- Lipilip Elementary School
- Lubigan Jr. Elementary School
- Lubigan Sr. Elementary School
- Malaguico Elementary School
- Manangle Elementary School
- Mangapo Elementary School
- Mangga Elementary School
- Manlubang Public School
- Mantela Elementary School
- Nazareth Institute of Learning & Formation
- Sagrada Elementary School
- Salvacion Elementary School
- San Isidro Public School
- San Vicente Elementary School
- Santa Cruz Elementary School
- Serranz Learning Center
- Serranzana Elementary School
- Sipocot North Central School
- Sipocot South Central School
- Soledad R. Villafuerte Elementary School (Bolo Norte Elementary School)
- Taisan Elementary School
- Tara Elementary School
- Tigman Elementary School
- Tula-Tula Elementary School
- Vigaan Elementary School
- Villazar North Elementary School
- Villazar South Elementary School
- Yabu-Salanda Elementary School

=== Secondary schools ===
- Anib National High School
- Bolo Norte High School
- Caima National High School
- Camarines Sur International School
- CBSUA-Sipocot Laboratory High School
- Felix O. Alfelor Sr. Foundation College (High School)
- Manangle National High School
- Sacred Heart High School
- Sipocot National High School
- Villazar National High School

=== Higher educational institutions ===
- Central Bicol State University of Agriculture - Sipocot
- Felix O. Alfelor Sr. Foundation College

== Notable people ==
- Carmelle Collado - singer and first-ever winner of Eurovision Song Contest Asia
