= N67 =

N67 may refer to:

== Roads ==
- N67 road (Ireland)
- Bay–Calauan–San Pablo Road, in the Philippines
- Nebraska Highway 67, in the United States

== Other uses ==
- N67 (Long Island bus)
- Escadrille N67, a unit of the French Air Force
- HMS Osiris (N67), a submarine of the Royal Navy
