= Maulawin Spring Protected Landscape =

Protected area in Philippines

- IUCN category V (protected landscape/seascape)
- Location within Philippines
- Location: Quezon, Philippines
- Nearest city: Lucena
- Coordinates: 13°54′10″N 122°25′29″E
- Area: 149.01 hectares (368.2 acres)
- Established: January 2, 1939 (Watershed forest reserve); April 23, 2000 (Protected landscape)
- Governing body: Department of Environment and Natural Resources

The Maulawin Spring Protected Landscape is a protected landscape area of forested hills and several rivers and streams located in the province of Quezon on southern Luzon island in the Philippines. It was originally created in 1939 to protect the watershed in the municipality of Guinayangan known as the Maulawin Spring Watershed Forest Reserve declared through Proclamation No. 365 by President Manuel Luis Quezon. It had an initial area of 60 hectares (150 acres). In 2000, the forest reserve was enlarged and was redesignated as a protected landscape under the National Integrated Protected Areas System by virtue of Proclamation No. 295 issued by President Joseph Estrada. It is the only source of potable water for domestic consumption of the more than 40,000 residents of Guinayangan.

== Geography ==
The Maulawin Spring Protected Landscape covers an area of 149.01 hectares (368.2 acres) of lowland forest in the barangays of Himbubulo, San Pedro and Magsaysay in west-central Guinayangan. It sits on a hilly terrain in the eastern portion of the Tayabas Isthmus and the northeastern extreme of Bondoc Peninsula near Guinayangan's border with the municipalities of Calauag and Lopez. The park is traversed by several rivers and creeks, some of which dry up during the summer months and which empty into the Catabangan Bay and Ragay Gulf, including the Maulawin River, Hiwasayan River, Tubog Creek and Prenza River. These rivers supply water for the Guinayangan Water District. The topography of the park is characterized as a complex of land configuration ranging from slightly level, sloping to rolling, and steep to hilly and rugged mountains. It has an elevation of between 250 metres (820 ft) and 500 metres (1,600 ft) above sea level and is composed primarily of clay loam.

The park is located about 1.5 kilometres (0.93 mi) west of the Guinayangan Poblacion and some 130 kilometres (81 mi) east of the provincial capital city of Lucena. It is surrounded by private agricultural lands and coconut plantations in Ermita, San Roque, Dungawan and Sisi. It is accessible via the provincial road to Guinayangan from the Pan-Philippine Highway (AH26) in Calauag, thence by foot through numerous trails from barangays Sisi and Calimpak.

== Biodiversity ==
The park is a forested area with sixty percent of its territory inhabited by dipterocarp trees, including molave, kamagong, guijo, red lauan, and white lauan, yakal and manggachapui. It is home to a diverse bird species, such as the Philippine dwarf kingfisher, rufous hornbill, northern sooty woodpecker, black-naped oriole, Philippine coucal, jungle crow, coleto, black-winged kite and Philippine collared dove. It also supports some large mammals, including the crab-eating macaque, Philippine deer, Philippine warty pig, Asian palm civet, as well several bats and snakes.

== See also ==
- Quezon Protected Landscape
