= Guinayangan =

Municipality in Quezon, Philippines

- Municipality
- Municipality of Guinayangan
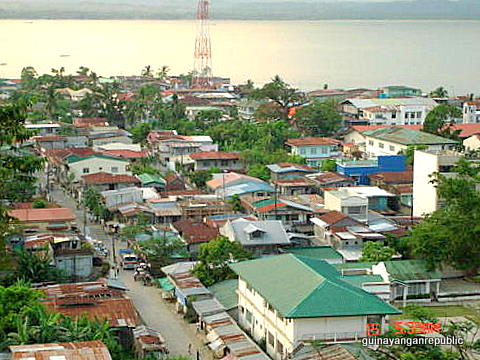
- Hilltop view of the municipality

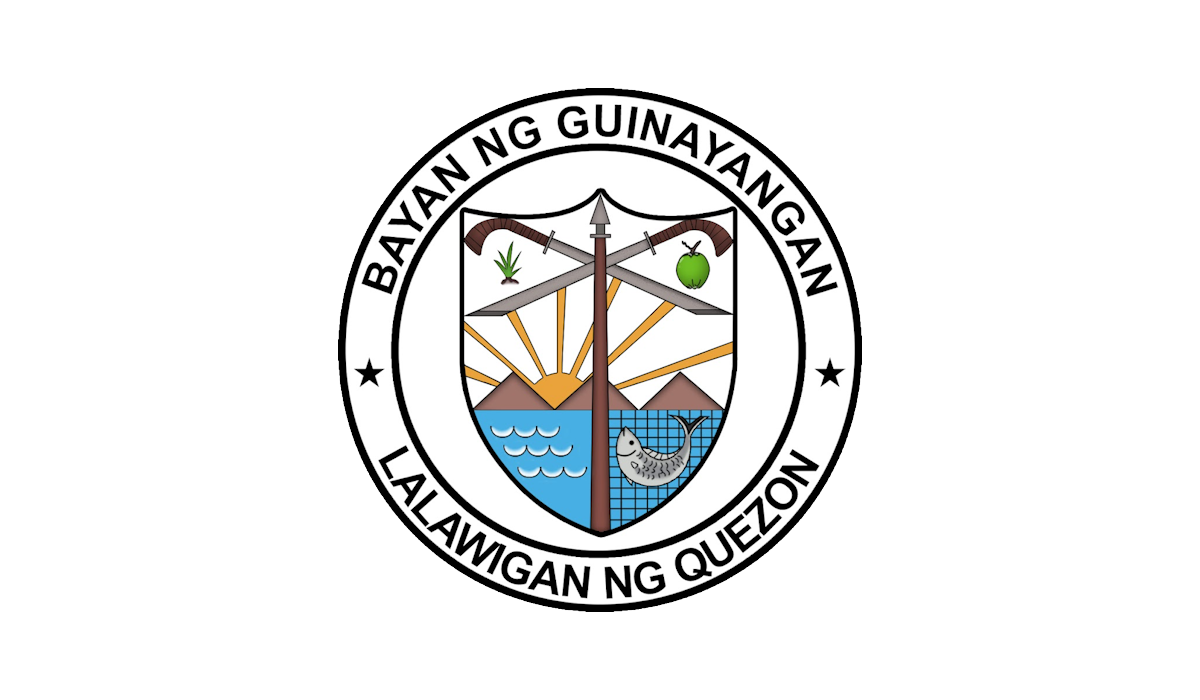
- Flag Seal

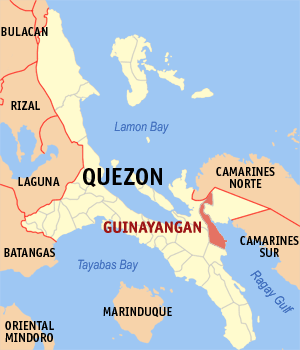
- Map of Quezon with Guinayangan highlighted
- Interactive map of Guinayangan
- Location within the Philippines
- Coordinates: 13°54′N 122°27′E
- Country: Philippines
- Region: Calabarzon
- Province: Quezon
- District: 4th district
- Founded: June 20, 1804
- Barangays: 54 (see Barangays)

Government
  - Type: Sangguniang Bayan
  - Mayor: Cesar J. Isaac III
  - Vice Mayor: Norman R. Dublois
  - Representative: Keith Micah DL. Tan
  - Municipal Council: Members: Christopher Marco J. Isaac; Glenn D. Butardo; Ma. Theresa Andrea S. Toquire; Dora P. Arieta; Ernesto A. Serante; Gregorio Q. Cadacio Jr.; Dr. Angel T. Ardiente Jr.; Abraham P. Español
  - Electorate: 27,750 voters (2025)

Area
  - Total: 214.12 km^{2} (82.67 sq mi)
- Elevation: 71 m (233 ft)
- Highest elevation: 302 m (991 ft)
- Lowest elevation: 0 m (0 ft)

Population (2024 census)
  - Total: 45,375
  - Density: 211.91/km^{2} (548.85/sq mi)
  - Households: 11,521
- Demonym: Guinayanganin

Economy
  - Income class: 1st municipal income class
  - Poverty incidence: 7.13% (2023)
  - Revenue: ₱ 221 million (2024)
  - Assets: ₱ 646.5 million (2024)
  - Expenditure: ₱ 81.86 million (2024)
  - Liabilities: ₱ 210 million (2024)

Service provider
  - Electricity: Quezon 1 Electric Cooperative (QUEZELCO 1)
  - Water: Guinayangan Water District
- Time zone: UTC+8 (PST)
- ZIP code: 4319
- PSGC: 0405618000
- IDD : area code: +63 (0)42
- Native languages: Tagalog
- Website: www.guinayangan.com

Guinayangan, officially the Municipality of Guinayangan (Tagalog: Bayan ng Guinayangan), is a municipality in the province of Quezon, Philippines. According to the 2024 census, it has a population of 45,375 people.

The municipality is home to the Maulawin Spring Protected Landscape and the critically endangered Inagta Lopez, a dialect of the critically endangered Inagta Alabat language, which has at most 30 speakers left in the world.

== Etymology ==
The name of Guinayangan comes from the word "gayang", a poison extracted from a plant by the locals. It was used by the natives to infuse it in their spears and arrows which they used to repel the Moro invasions. The gayang became an important thing among the natives who lived peacefully as the Moros were repelled in every attack they made.

The natives who were infusing gayang to the arrows were spotted by the Spanish missionaries who wished to spread religious faith in the area. The missionaries ask for the "name of the place" in Spanish dialect. Due to the language barrier, the natives misinterpreted the question for "What are you doing" and answered "Ginayangan" or "We applied gayang". Ever since the place was known and pronounced "Ginyangan" omitting the "a" sound.

== History ==
Guinayangan was a former part of the town of Gumaca together with its neighbor town Lopez, Quezon from the oldest record it was first mentioned during colonial era.

Guinayangan gained its territory with the transfer of the barrio Aloneros from Tagkawayan by virtue of Executive Order No. 78, signed by President Manuel Roxas on August 12, 1947. The annexation became effective on January 1, 1948.

Guinayangan was not spared the social and economic turmoil during the Dictatorship of Ferdinand Marcos, including his 1971 suspension of the writ of habeas corpus, his 1972 declaration of martial law, and his continued hold on power from the lifting of martial law in 1981 until his ouster under the People Power Revolution of 1986. One major event that took place during this period was the Guinayangan massacre of February 1, 1981, in which Military elements opened fire on a group of coconut farmers who were marching towards the Guinayangan plaza to protest the coco levy fund scam. Two people were killed and 27 were wounded.

Also prevalent during the time were political assassinations such as the murder of Barangay Captain Eliseo Dapog on July 6, 1985, after he had signed a petition for the Batasang Pambansa (the Philippine legislature at the time) to investigate human rights violations in the area. Dapog would later be honored by having his name inscribed on the Wall of Remembrance at the Philippines' Bantayog ng mga Bayani, which honors the martyrs and heroes who resisted authoritarian rule during this time.

Marcos was finally deposed by the civilian-led People Power Revolution in February 1986, and a revolutionary government was temporarily put in place until the 1987 Constitution of the Philippines could be ratified. During this time, Guinayangan was led by an OIC mayor. The previous officeholder was reelected after the establishment of the Fifth Philippine Republic, serving a term that ended in 1988.

== Geography ==
=== Barangays ===
Guinayangan is politically subdivided into 54 barangays, as indicated below. Each barangay consists of puroks and some have sitios.

- A. Mabini
- Aloneros
- Arbismen
- Bagong Silang
- Balinarin
- Bukal Maligaya
- Cabibihan
- Cabong Norte
- Cabong Sur
- Calimpak
- Capuluan Central
- Capuluan Tulon
- Dancalan Caimawan
- Dancalan Central
- Danlagan Batis
- Danlagan Cabayao
- Danlagan Central
- Danlagan Reserva
- Del Rosario
- Dungawan Central
- Dungawan Paalyunan
- Dungawan Pantay
- Ermita
- Gapas
- Himbubulo Este
- Himbubulo Weste
- Hinabaan
- Ligpit Bantayan
- Lubigan
- Magallanes
- Magsaysay
- Manggagawa
- Manggalang
- Manlayo
- Poblacion
- Salacan
- San Antonio
- San Isidro
- San Jose
- San Lorenzo
- San Luis I
- San Luis II
- San Miguel
- San Pedro I
- San Pedro II
- San Roque
- Santa Cruz
- Santa Maria
- Santa Teresita
- Sintones
- Sisi
- Tikay
- Triumpo
- Villa Hiwasayan

=== Climate ===
Climate data for Guinayangan, Quezon
Month	Jan	Feb	Mar	Apr	May	Jun	Jul	Aug	Sep	Oct	Nov	Dec	Year
Mean daily maximum °C (°F)	26 (79)	27 (81)	28 (82)	31 (88)	31 (88)	30 (86)	29 (84)	29 (84)	29 (84)	28 (82)	28 (82)	27 (81)	29 (83)
Mean daily minimum °C (°F)	22 (72)	22 (72)	22 (72)	23 (73)	24 (75)	24 (75)	24 (75)	24 (75)	24 (75)	24 (75)	23 (73)	23 (73)	23 (74)
Average precipitation mm (inches)	51 (2.0)	35 (1.4)	37 (1.5)	39 (1.5)	91 (3.6)	131 (5.2)	168 (6.6)	132 (5.2)	162 (6.4)	184 (7.2)	166 (6.5)	101 (4.0)	1,297 (51.1)
Average rainy days	13.4	10.5	11.8	12.0	19.8	24.1	26.7	25.1	25.3	23.9	21.2	17.6	231.4
Source: Meteoblue

== Demographics ==
Population census of Guinayangan
Year	Pop.	±% p.a.
1903	3,870	—
1918	4,053	+0.31%
1939	15,948	+6.74%
1948	8,390	−6.89%
1960	16,428	+5.76%
1970	26,278	+4.80%
1975	26,860	+0.44%
1980	29,174	+1.67%
1990	32,829	+1.19%
1995	36,775	+2.15%
2000	37,164	+0.23%
2007	39,074	+0.69%
2010	41,669	+2.37%
2015	45,155	+1.54%
2020	44,045	−0.52%
2024	45,375	+0.72%
Source: Philippine Statistics Authority

== Economy ==
Poverty incidence of Guinayangan (%)

Source: Philippine Statistics Authority

== Culture ==
=== Festivals ===
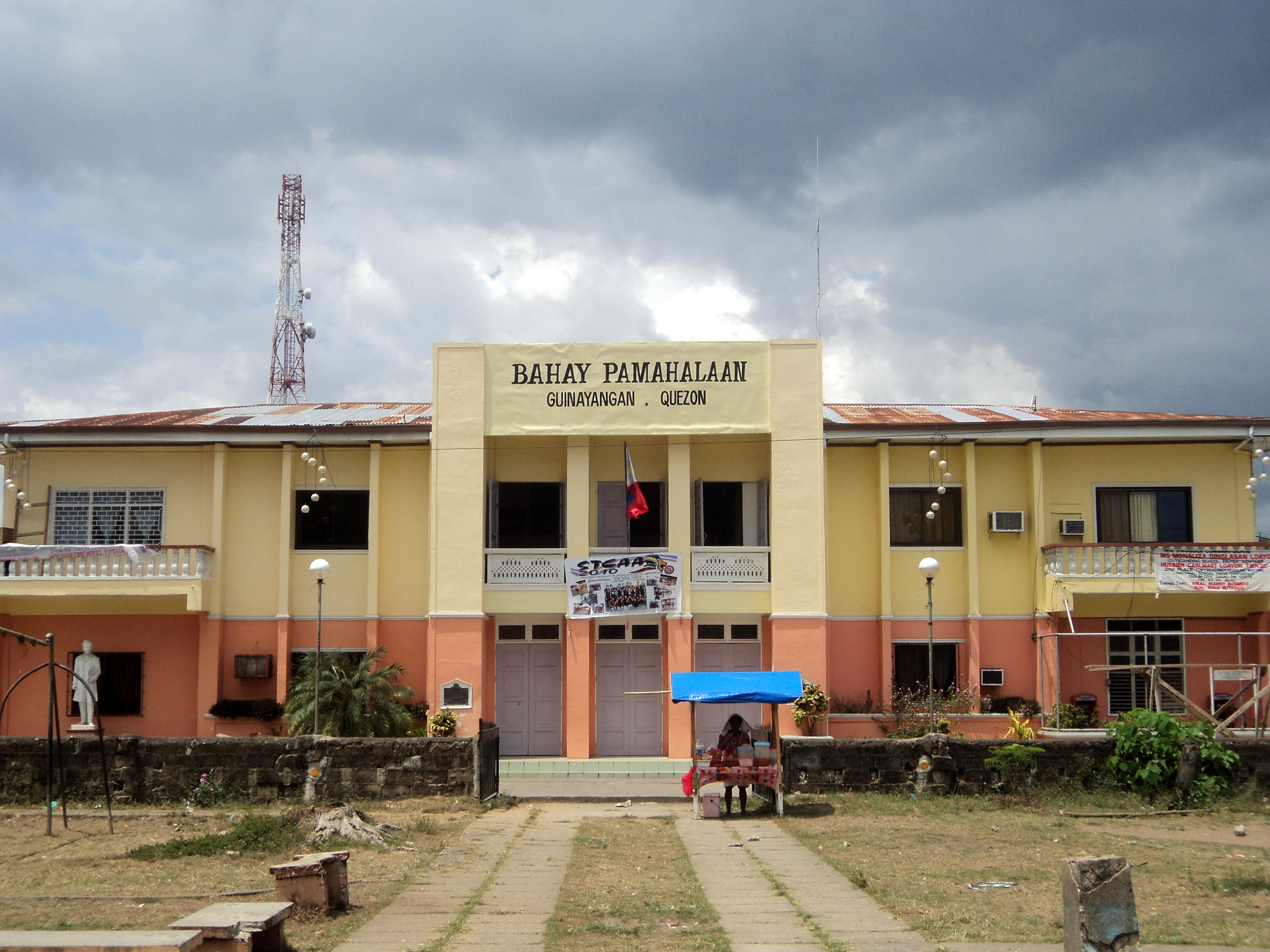
Municipal Hall

When the month of June comes, the people of Guinayangan, Quezon prepare for the annual celebration of Gayang Festival, wherein the coconut tree and the banana is the main attraction of the festivities. The festival is highlighted by a street dancing competition participated by the residents of different barangays, as well as by elementary and high school students.

In the later part of 2000, the very first Seafoods Festival was held in the town. However, it was replaced by Gayang Festival in the succeeding years to give importance to the town's history.

== Tourism ==
- Town Proper
- Guinayangan Tree Park
- Guinayangan Fishport
- Municipal Nursery
- Maulawin Spring Protected Landscape
- Hinabaan Falls
- Hinabaan River
- Alfonsos Resort
- YumiYami Farm and Resort
- Bay View Resort
- Blue Dragon Resort
- Keinz Resort and Events Place
- Salacan Resort
- Hidden Haven Resort
- Guinayangan Mangrove Boardwalk
- L.A.C Resort & Leisure Farm
- La Playa Merced
- Villa Leonora Beach Resort
- White House
- Maine Hotel
- Bayside Hotel
- Guinayangan Highlands/Magsaysay Hills
- Palad Island
- Tabayigan Falls
- Tabayigan Natural Rock Formation
- Lumot Falls
- Malapinggan Falls
- Busay, Barangay Himbubulo Weste
- Dungawan Falls
- Mangalang Falls
- Dumagundong Falls
- Banot Falls
- Gapas Falls
- Malituko Caves
- Mona Cave
- Libis Falls
- Busay, Balinarin
- Hillside Resort Balinarin
- D' Pasigan
- Paresan sa Niyugan
- Alimangroove
- Dragon Fruit Plantation

=== Churches ===
- San Luis Gonzaga Parish (est.1830)
- San Antonio de Padua Parish (est.1956)

== Education ==
The Guinayangan Schools District Office governs all educational institutions within the municipality. It oversees the management and operations of all private and public, from primary to secondary schools.

=== Primary and elementary schools ===
- Aloneros Elementary School
- Arbismen Elementary School
- Bagong Silang Elementary School
- Capuluan Tulon Elementary School
- Dancalan Caimawan Elementary School
- Dancalan Central Elementary School
- Danlagan Elementary School
- Don Guillermo Eleazar Elementary School
- Dungawan Central Elementary School
- Dungawan Paalyunan Elementary School
- Gapas Elementary School
- Gregorio M. Mendoza Elementary School
- Guinayangan Academy
- Guinayangan Elementary School
- Ligpit Bantayan Elementary School
- Lubigan Elementary School
- Mabini Elementary School
- Nabangka Elementary School
- Saint Aloysius Gonzaga Parochial School
- San Isidro Elementary School
- San Luis I Elementary School
- San Luis II Elementary School
- San Roque Elementary
- Sintones Elementary School
- Sisi Elementary School
- Sta. Cruz Elementary School
- Sta. Maria Elementary School

=== Secondary schools ===
- Aloneros National High School former Lamon Bay School of Fisheries
- Dungawan National High School
- Guinayangan National High School
- Nabangka National High School
- Saint Aloysius Gonzaga Parochial High School
- Sta Cruz National High School

=== Higher educational institutions ===
- Guinayangan College Foundation
