= Bay–Calauan–San Pablo Road =

Road in the Philippines

Bay–Calauan–San Pablo Road
- Calauan–San Pablo Road
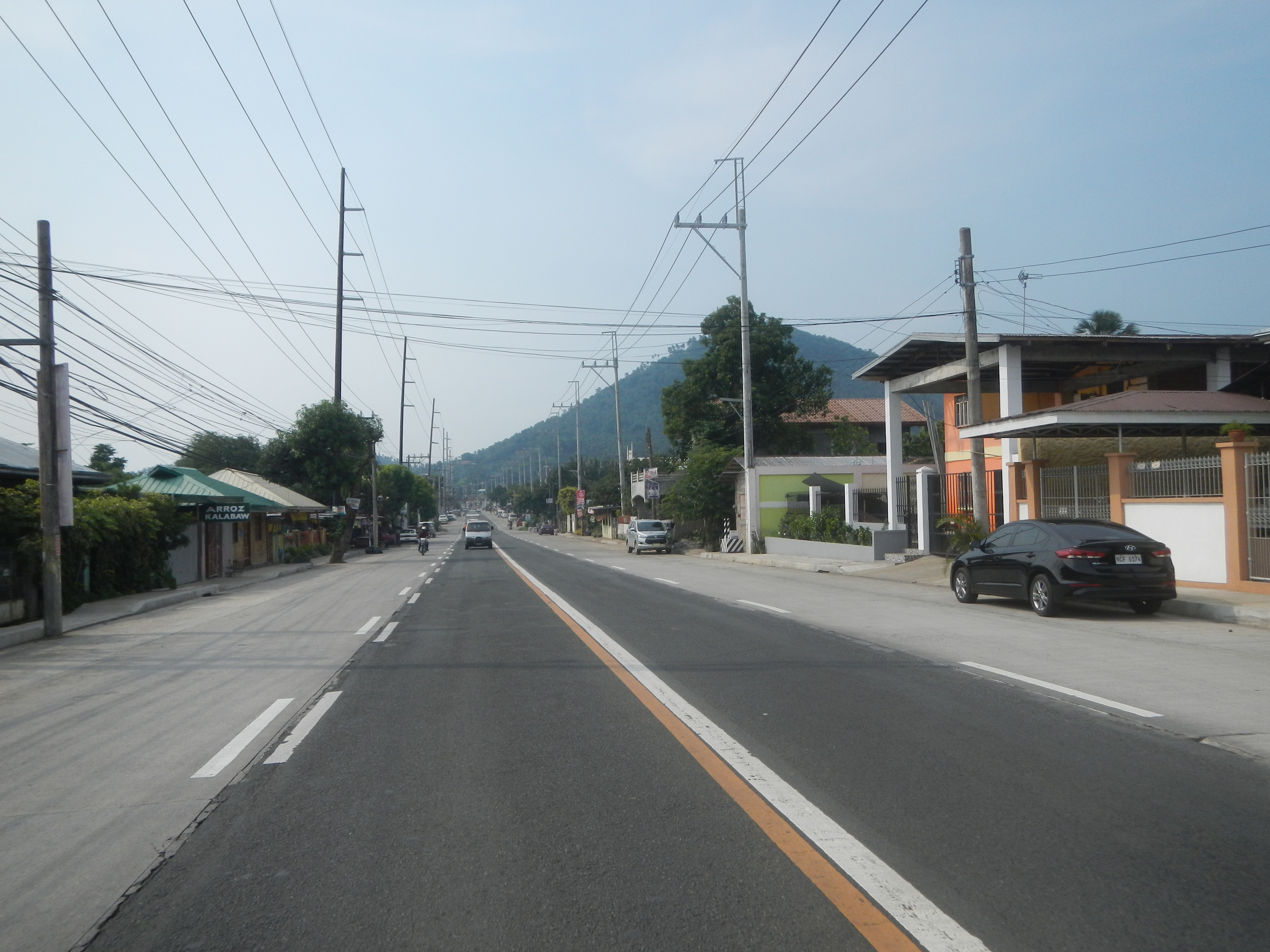
- Bay–Calauan–San Pablo Road in San Pablo, Laguna

Route information
- Maintained by Department of Public Works and Highways
- Component highways: N67 from Calauan to San Pablo

Major junctions
- North end: N66 (Calamba–Pagsanjan Road) in Bay
- N67 (Calauan–Victoria Road) in Calauan
- South end: N67 (Cipriano B. Colago Avenue) in San Pablo

Location
- Country: Philippines
- Provinces: Laguna
- Major cities: San Pablo
- Towns: Bay, Calauan

Highway system
- Roads in the Philippines; Highways; Expressways; List
| ← N66 | → N68 |

The Bay–Calauan–San Pablo Road is a national primary road that connects the municipality of Bay to the city of San Pablo. It is also known as Mariano Marfori Avenue in Calauan and Lt. Cosico Avenue in San Pablo. It forms part of National Route 67 (N67) of the Philippine highway network.
