= Tagkawayan =

Municipality in Quezon, Philippines

- Municipality
- Municipality of Tagkawayan
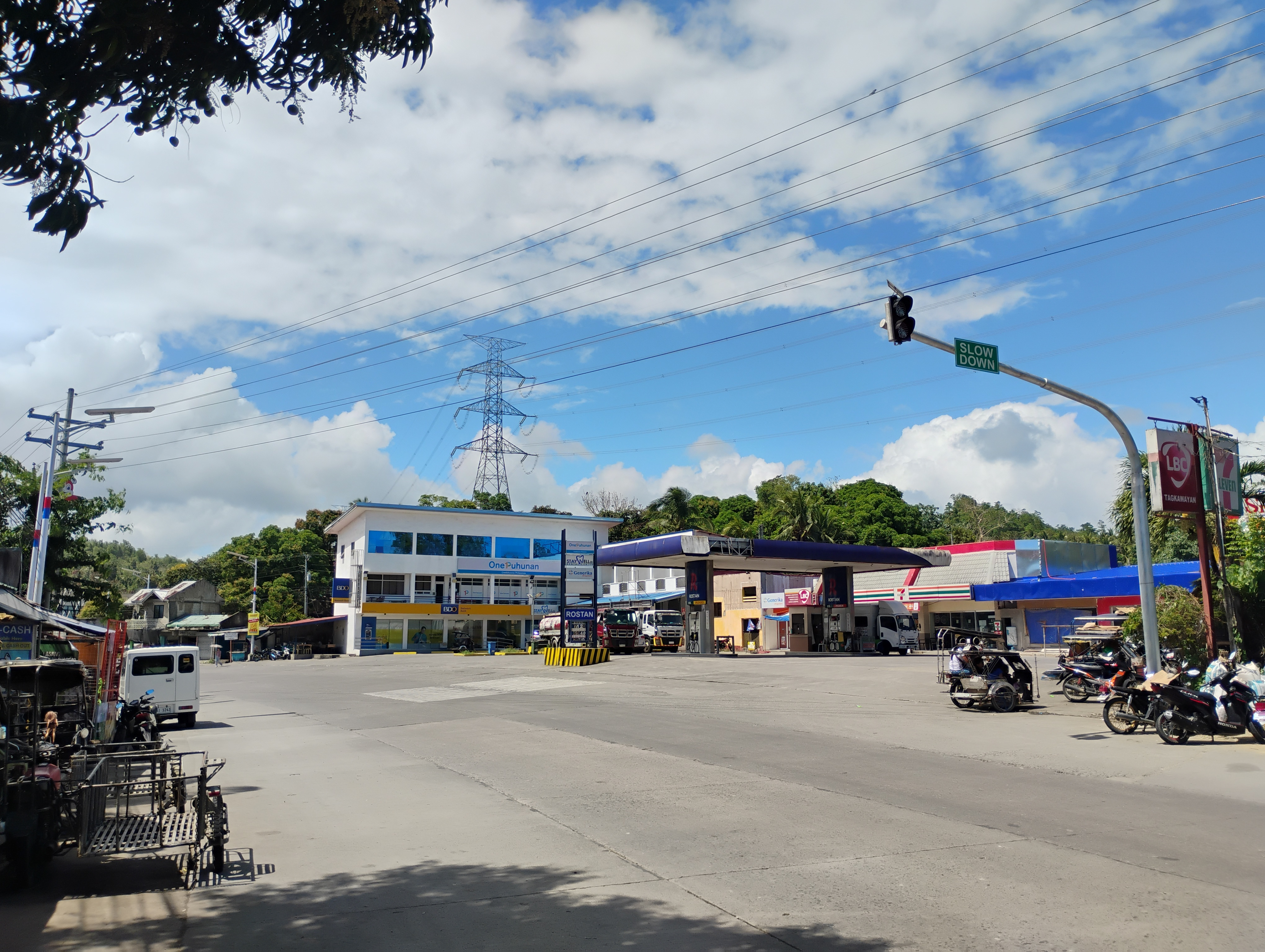
- Quirino Highway

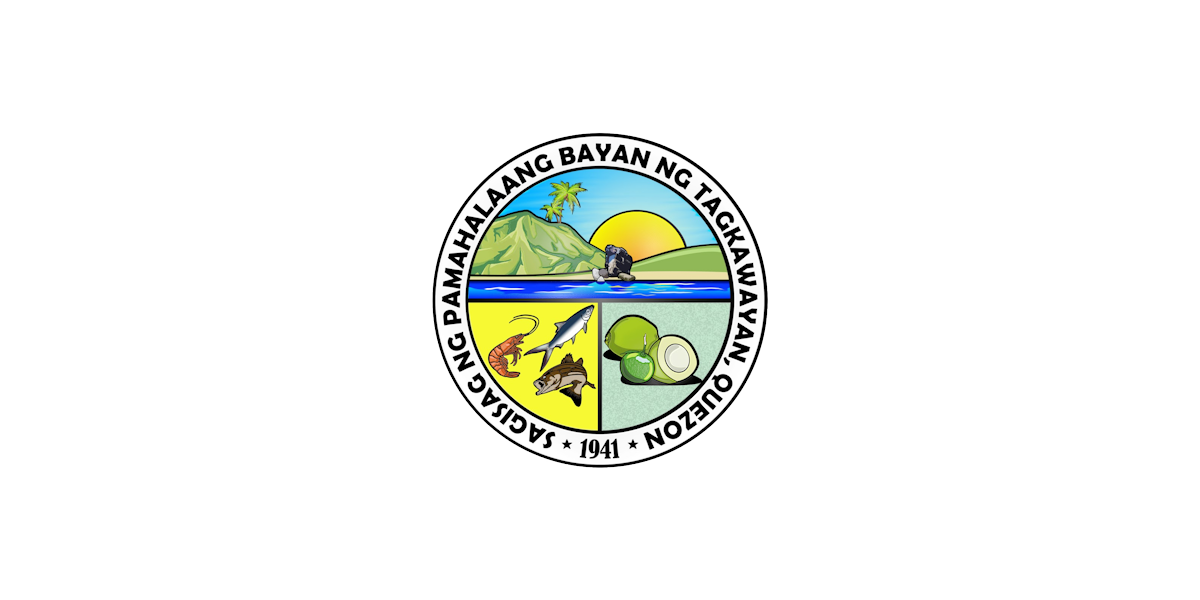
- Flag
- Etymology: Bamboo
- Nickname: Gateway to Calabarzon
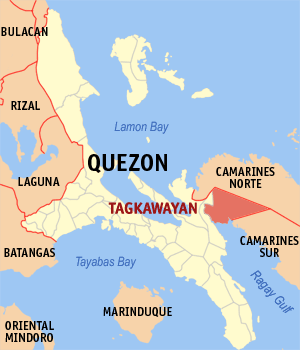
- Map of Quezon with Tagkawayan highlighted
- Interactive map of Tagkawayan
- Location within the Philippines
- Coordinates: 13°58′N 122°32′E
- Country: Philippines
- Region: Calabarzon
- Province: Quezon
- District: 4th district
- Founded: January 1, 1941
- Barangays: 45 (see Barangays)

Government
  - Type: Sangguniang Bayan
  - Mayor: Luis Oscar T. Eleazar
  - Vice Mayor: Danilo L. Liwanag
  - Representative: Keith Micah DL. Tan
  - Municipal Council: Members: Roberto T. de Vero; Vicente S. Salumbides IV; Veronica A. Masangkay; John Pocholo C. Eleazar; Leo C. San Buenaventura; Rosulo D. Magpantay; Josefina W. Guarin; Jose Rhoel R. Enriquez
  - Electorate: 36,160 voters (2025)

Area
  - Total: 534.35 km^{2} (206.31 sq mi)
- Elevation: 46 m (151 ft)
- Highest elevation: 195 m (640 ft)
- Lowest elevation: 0 m (0 ft)

Population (2024 census)
  - Total: 54,709
  - Density: 102.38/km^{2} (265.17/sq mi)
  - Households: 13,060
- Demonym: Tagkawayanin

Economy
  - Income class: 1st municipal income class
  - Poverty incidence: 10.23% (2023)
  - Revenue: ₱ 340.5 million (2024)
  - Assets: ₱ 1,316 million (2024)
  - Expenditure: ₱ 140.8 million (2024)
  - Liabilities: ₱ 351.3 million (2024)

Service provider
  - Electricity: Quezon 1 Electric Cooperative (QUEZELCO 1)
- Time zone: UTC+8 (PST)
- ZIP code: 4321
- PSGC: 0405646000
- IDD : area code: +63 (0)42
- Native languages: Tagalog
- Sister towns: Calauag; Guinayangan; Buenavista
- Major religions: Catholicism; Protestantism

Tagkawayan, officially the Municipality of Tagkawayan (Tagalog: Bayan ng Tagkawayan), is a municipality in the province of Quezon, Philippines. According to the 2024 census, it has a population of 54,709 people.

== Etymology ==
Tagkawayan is derived from the Tagalog phrase taga-kawayan, which translates to "from bamboo," a term that referred to the early settlers of the area, primarily Aetas. These settlers would hold festive gatherings by the seashore, signaling neighboring tribes to join by raising a cloth-tied bamboo pole from a high rock.

== History ==
=== Pre-establishment ===
In the early Spanish period, Tagkawayan was mainly inhabited by Aetas around Mount Cadig. Over time, migrants from Ambos Camarines and Bondoc Peninsula settled in the area as they were attracted by its rich forest resources. Tagkawayan later became a hub for various ethnic groups (including Ilocanos and Kapampangans), drawn by opportunities in logging, mining, plywood manufacturing, fishing, and agriculture.

After the rise in population with the potential of an economic growth, a formal petition to convert barrio Tagcawayan, then in Guinayangan, into an independent municipality was launched. The said letter was sent to President Manuel L. Quezon through Tomas Morato. Antonio Lagdameo then laid out an "urbanization plan" was laid out for the proposed municipality. During that time, Tagkawayan encompassed four sitios.

=== Establishment as municipality ===
On December 31, 1940, the barrios of Aloneros, Bagong Silang, Balogo, Cabibihan, Catimo, Danlagan, Kabugwang, Kandalapdap, Malbog, Monato, Mangayaw, Quinatacutan, Siguiwan, Tagkawayan, and Triumfo, then part of the municipality of Guinayangan, were separated and constituted into a new and separate municipality known as Tagkawayan, by virtue of Executive Order No. 316. The change took effect on the next day, January 1, 1941.

On March 7, 1941, the Guinayangan sitios of Aliji, Bamban, Bukal, Danlagan, Batis, Del Rosario, Manatong Ilaya, Manatong Munti, Malupot, San Luis, San Roque Manato, Santo Niño, and portions of Tuba were annexed to the municipality by virtue of Executive Order No. 330. On January 1, 1948, the barrio of Aloneros was returned to Guinayangan by virtue of Executive Order No. 78 signed on August 12, 1947.

== Geography ==
Tagkawayan is the easternmost town of Quezon and therefore the Calabarzon region, bordered to the east by the province of Camarines Norte and to the south by Camarines Sur in the Bicol Region. Tagkawayan is 148 kilometers (92 mi) from Lucena and 278 kilometers (173 mi) from Manila.

=== Barangays ===
Tagkawayan is politically subdivided into 45 barangays, as indicated below. Each barangay consists of puroks and some have sitios.

- Aldavoc
- Aliji
- Bagong Silang
- Bambán
- Bosigon
- Bukál
- Cabuguang
- Cagascas
- Casispalan
- Colong-colong
- Del Rosario
- Cabibihan
- Candalapdap
- Katimo
- Kinatakutan
- Landing
- Laurel
- Magsaysáy
- Maguibuay
- Mahinta
- Malbog
- Manato Central
- Manato Station
- Mangayao
- Mansilay
- Mapulot
- Muntíng Parang
- Payapà
- Población
- Rizal
- Sabang
- San Diego
- San Francisco
- San Isidro
- San Jose
- San Roque
- San Vicente
- Santa Cecilia
- Santa Monica
- Santo Niño I
- Santo Niño II
- Santo Tomás
- Seguiwan
- Tabason
- Tunton
- Victoria

=== Climate ===
Climate data for Tagkawayan, Quezon
Month	Jan	Feb	Mar	Apr	May	Jun	Jul	Aug	Sep	Oct	Nov	Dec	Year
Mean daily maximum °C (°F)	26 (79)	27 (81)	29 (84)	31 (88)	31 (88)	30 (86)	29 (84)	29 (84)	29 (84)	29 (84)	28 (82)	27 (81)	29 (84)
Mean daily minimum °C (°F)	22 (72)	22 (72)	22 (72)	23 (73)	24 (75)	24 (75)	24 (75)	24 (75)	24 (75)	24 (75)	24 (75)	23 (73)	23 (74)
Average precipitation mm (inches)	51 (2.0)	35 (1.4)	37 (1.5)	39 (1.5)	91 (3.6)	131 (5.2)	168 (6.6)	132 (5.2)	162 (6.4)	184 (7.2)	166 (6.5)	101 (4.0)	1,297 (51.1)
Average rainy days	13.4	10.5	11.8	12.0	19.8	24.1	26.7	25.1	25.3	23.9	21.2	17.6	231.4
Source: Meteoblue

== Demographics ==
Population census of Tagkawayan
Year	Pop.	±% p.a.
1948	11,231	—
1960	28,664	+8.12%
1970	32,697	+1.32%
1975	32,187	−0.31%
1980	31,381	−0.51%
1990	40,221	+2.51%
1995	40,866	+0.30%
2000	44,290	+1.74%
2007	46,878	+0.79%
2010	50,833	+2.99%
2015	51,832	+0.37%
2020	54,003	+0.87%
2024	54,709	+0.31%
Source: Philippine Statistics Authority

== Economy ==
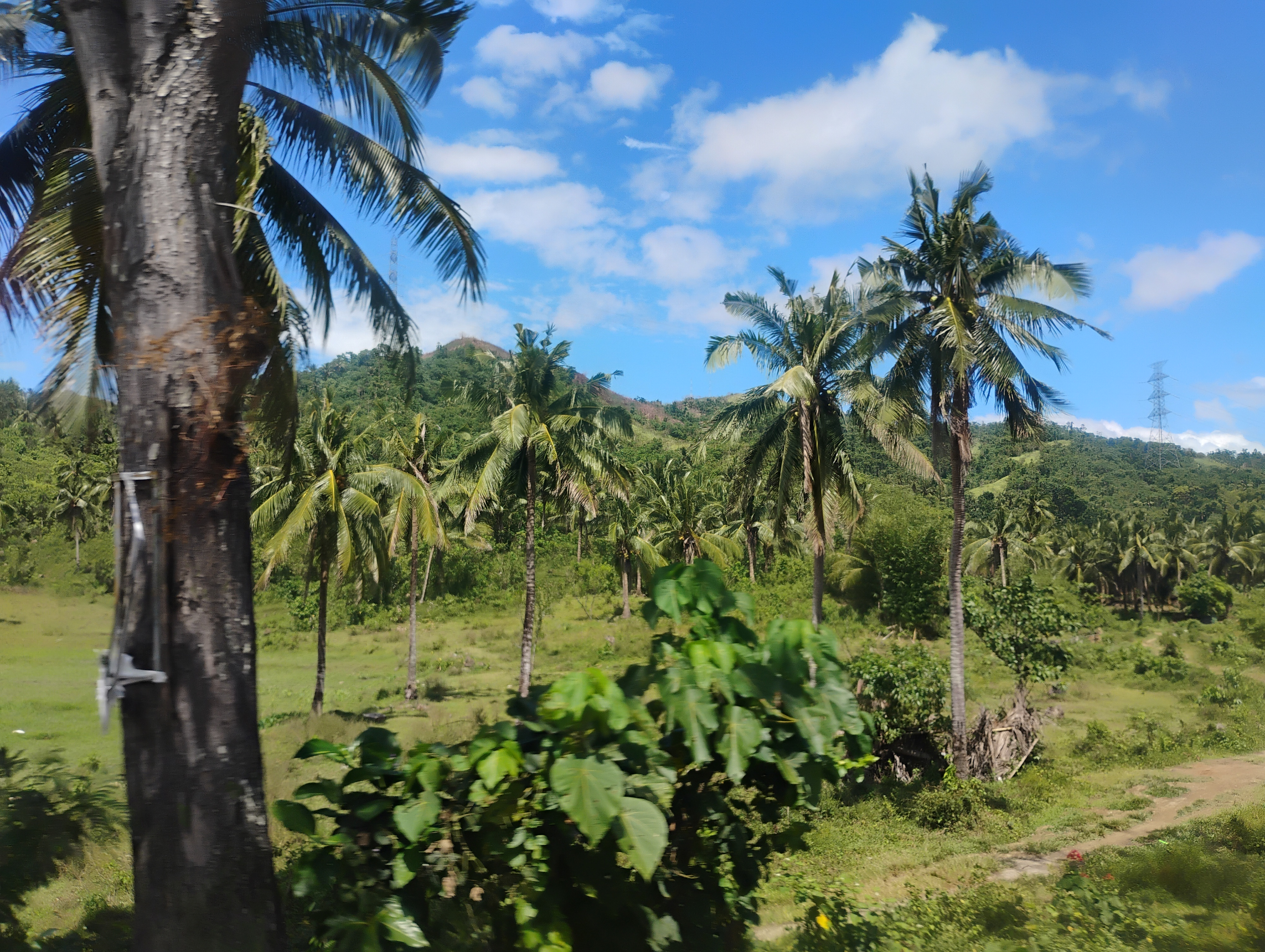
Coconut plantations in Tagkawayan

Poverty incidence of Tagkawayan (%)

Source: Philippine Statistics Authority

== Transportation ==
=== By Land ===
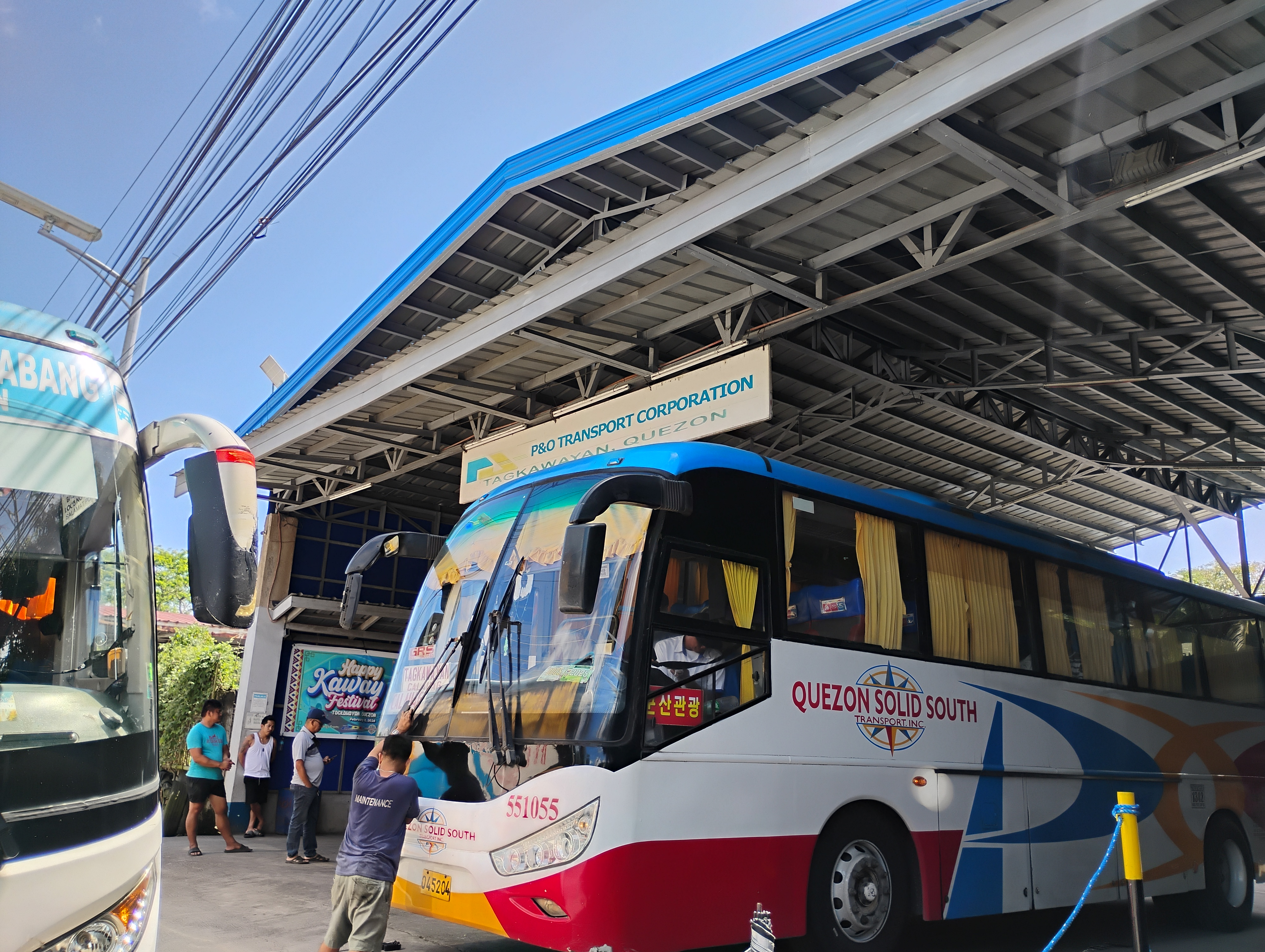
P.O. Transport Bus Terminal, Tagkawayan

The municipality is connected to Metro Manila by the Quirino Highway, and daily rail services to and from Naga and Legazpi to the southeast are provided by Philippine National Railways.

To spur development in the municipality, the Toll Regulatory Board designated Toll Road 5 as the extension of South Luzon Expressway. A 420-kilometer, four-lane expressway starting from the terminal point of the now under construction SLEX Toll Road 4 in Barangay Mayao, Lucena City to Matnog, Sorsogon, near the Matnog Ferry Terminal. On August 25, 2020, San Miguel Corporation announced that it will invest in the project, which will reduce travel time from Lucena to Matnog from 9 hours to 5.5 hours.

Another expressway that will serve Tagkawayan is the Quezon-Bicol Expressway (QuBEx), which will link Lucena and San Fernando, Camarines Sur.

== Churches ==
- Nuestra Señora de Lourdes Parish - Poblacion (est. 1943)

== Education ==
The Tagkawayan Schools District Office governs all educational institutions within the municipality. It oversees the management and operations of all private and public, from primary to secondary schools.

=== Primary and elementary schools ===
- Aliji Elementary School
- Bagong Silang Elementary School
- Bamban Elementary School
- Bosigon Elementary School
- Bukal Elementary School
- Cabibihan Elementary School
- Cabuguang Elementary School
- Casispalan Elementary School
- Del Rosario Elementary School
- F.Y. Salumbides Elementary School
- IEMELIF Learning Center
- Katimo Elementary School
- Kinatakutan Elementary School
- Landing Elementary School
- Laurel Elementary School
- Mabaang Elementary School
- Magsaysay Elementary School
- Manato Elementary School (Annex)
- Maguibuay Elementary School
- Mahinta Elementary School
- Manato Elementary School
- Mansilay Elementary School
- Mapulot Elementary School
- Montessori of the Infant Jesus
- Munting Parang Elementary School
- Our Lady of Lourdes Academy
- Payapa Elementary School
- Rizal Elementary School
- Sabang Elementary School
- San Diego Elementary School
- San Francisco Elementary School
- San Isidro Elementary School
- San Roque Elementary School
- San Vicente Elementary School
- Sta. Cecilia Elementary School
- Sta. Monica Elementary School
- Sto. Niño Elementary School
- Sto. Tomas Elementary School
- Tabason Elementary School
- Tagkawayan Central Elementary School
- Tunton Elementary School

=== Secondary schools ===
- Bagong Silang National High School
- Bamban National High School
- Cabibihan National High School
- Katimo National High School
- Kinatakutan National High School
- Mapulot National High School
- Mansilay National High School
- San Isidro Integrated School
- Sanmandelcar National High School
- Tabason National High School
- Tagkawayan High School
- Tagkawayan National High School
- Our Lady of Lourdes Academy

=== Higher educational institutions ===
- Aceba Science & Technology Institute
- Alexandria Computer School & Technology Foundation
- Philtech Institute of Arts & and Technology
- Southern Luzon State University - Judge Guillermo Eleazar (formerly Judge Guillermo Eleazar Polytechnic College)

== Notable personalities ==
- Guillermo Eleazar – Chief of Philippine National Police, 2021
- Mac Baracael – basketball player
