= 1999 Pacific typhoon season =

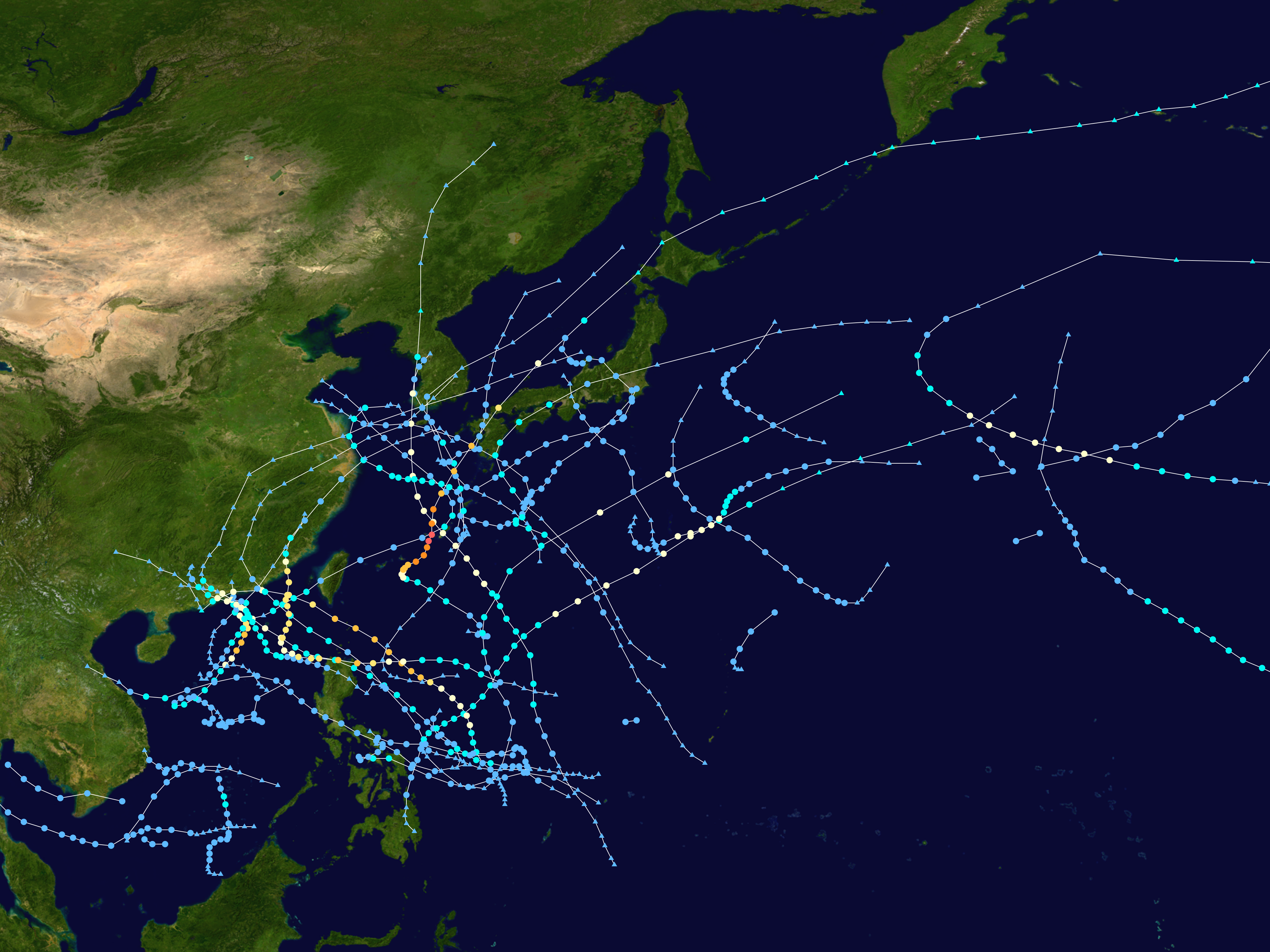
- Season summary map

Seasonal boundaries
- First system formed: January 3, 1999
- Last system dissipated: December 19, 1999

Strongest storm
- Name: Bart
  - Maximum winds: 165 km/h (105 mph) (10-minute sustained)
  - Lowest pressure: 932 hPa (mbar)

Seasonal statistics
- Total depressions: 45
- Total storms: 20
- Typhoons: 5 (record low)
- Very strong typhoons: 1
- Violent typhoons: 0
- ACE: 109.9 (lowest on record)
- Total fatalities: 1,798 total
- Total damage: $3.63 billion (1999 USD)

Related articles
- 1999 Atlantic hurricane season; 1999 Pacific hurricane season; 1999 North Indian Ocean cyclone season

The 1999 Pacific typhoon season was the last Pacific typhoon season to use English names as storm names. It also featured the lowest number of typhoons on record, with only five reaching this intensity. This was mainly due to a strong La Niña which persisted from last year. It also featured the least amount of ACE produced on record. The season was also below-average in named storms, with only 20 of such spawning. This season also featured multiple landfalls in Hong Kong, but it was much more active than the previous season. It had no official bounds; it ran year-round in 1999, but most tropical cyclones tend to form in the northwestern Pacific Ocean between June and November. These dates conventionally delimit the period of each year when most tropical cyclones form in the northwestern Pacific Ocean. The first named storm, Hilda, developed on January 6.

Tropical Storms formed in the entire west Pacific basin were assigned a name by the Joint Typhoon Warning Center. Tropical depressions in this basin have the "W" suffix added to their number. Tropical cyclones that enter or form in the Philippine area of responsibility are assigned a name by the Philippine Atmospheric, Geophysical and Astronomical Services Administration or PAGASA. This can often result in the same storm having two names. The strongest storm and only super typhoon of the season was Typhoon Bart (Oniang), which struck the Philippines, Taiwan, and Southern Japan. In June, Typhoon Maggie struck The Philippines as a category 3 typhoon. In December, Tropical Depression 33W struck southeastern Vietnam, ending the season on December 16.

== Systems ==
=== Tropical Storm Hilda (Auring) ===
- Tropical storm (JMA)
- Tropical storm (SSHWS)
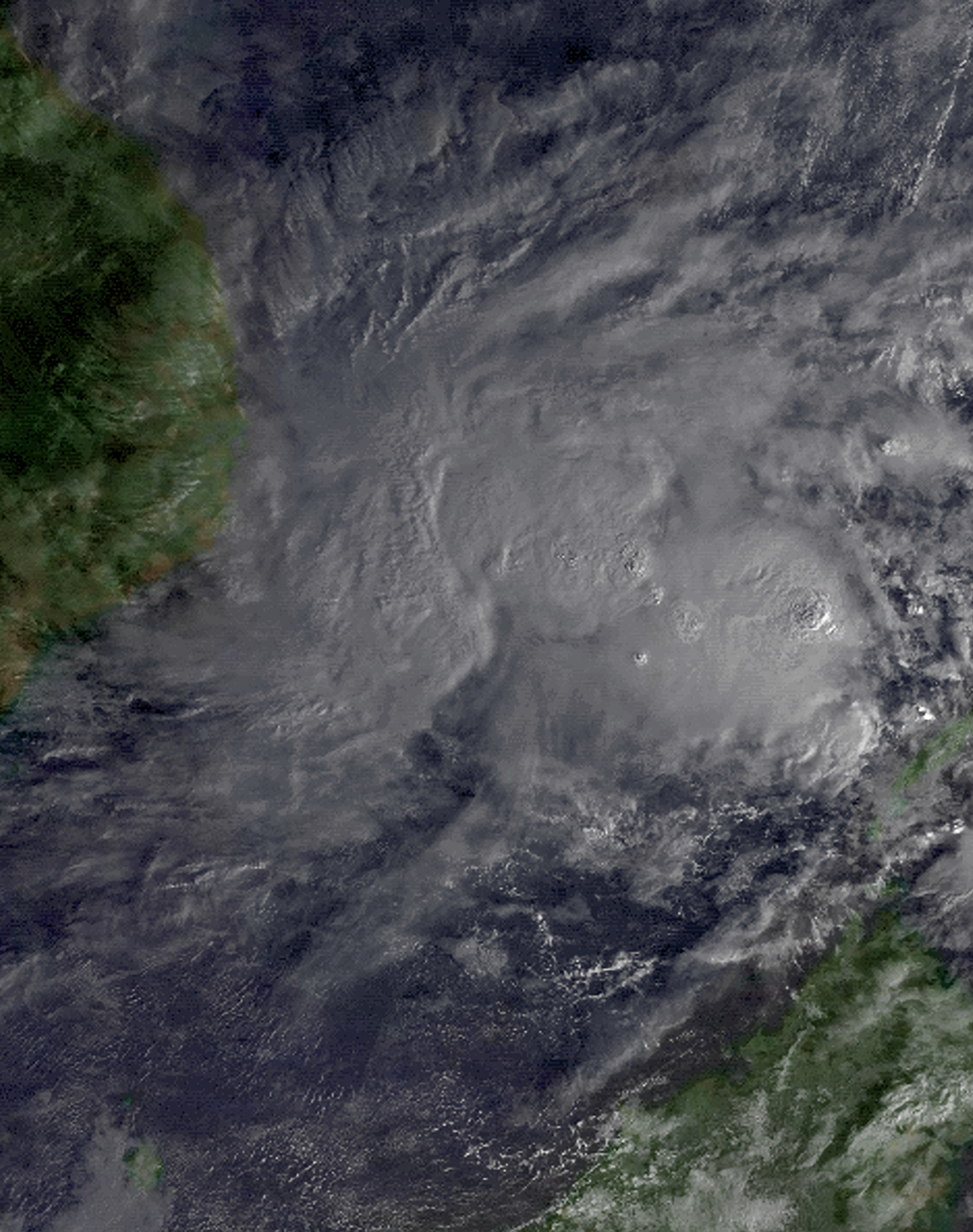
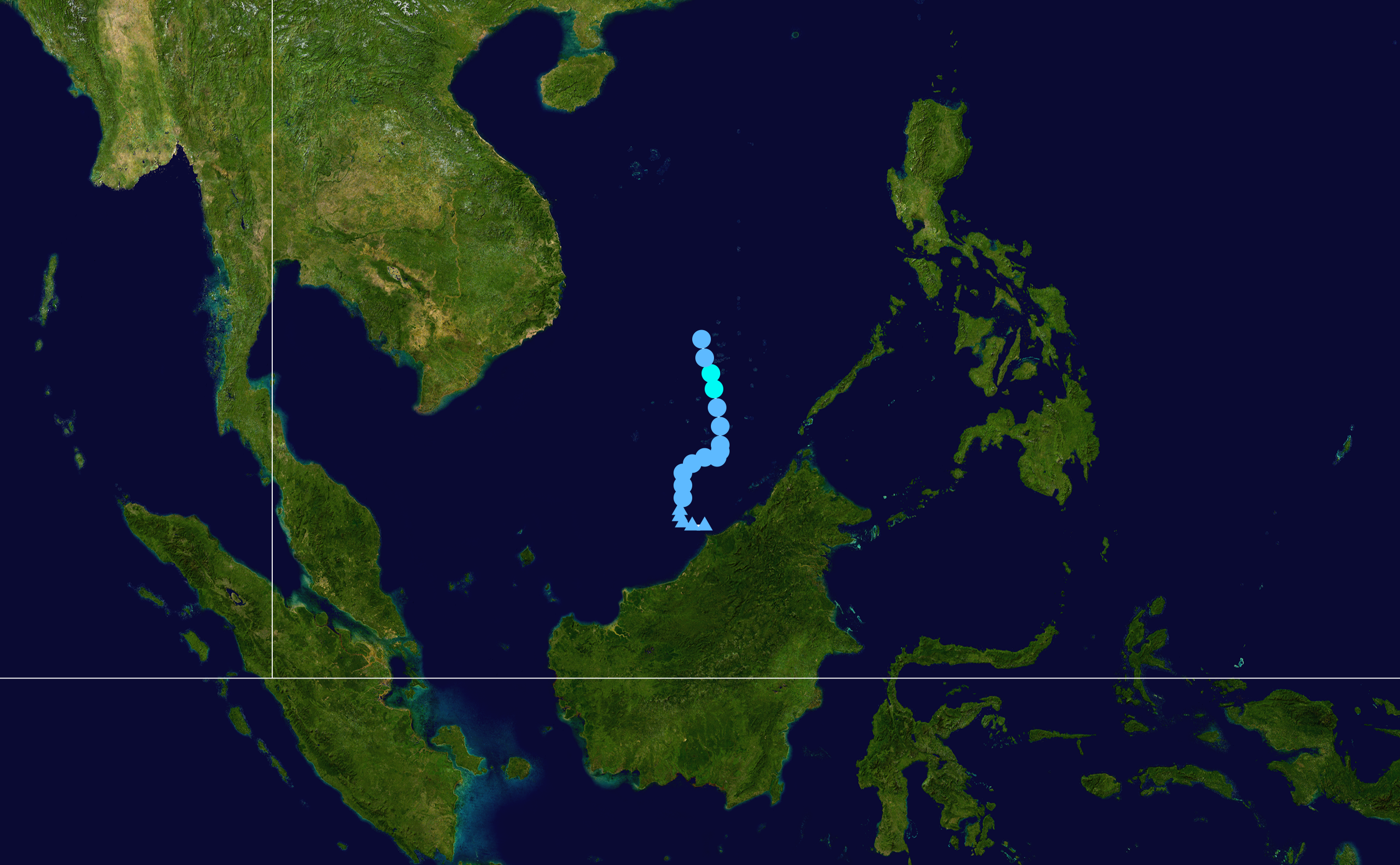
- Duration: January 3 – January 8
- Peak intensity: 65 km/h (40 mph) (10-min); 1000 hPa (mbar)

The JTWC issued a Tropical Cyclone Formation Alert (TCFA) for a developing broad circulation that stretched out from the northwest Borneo coast early on January 4. This developed into a tropical depression and moved slowly to the north away from Borneo, becoming Tropical Storm Hilda early on January 6. Soon after reaching its peak strength of 65 km/h (40 mph) Hilda drifted further north into an area of increased wind shear, which caused the storm to dissipate the next day. Both JMA and PAGASA tracked this system, but considered it a tropical depression. PAGASA named the storm Auring.

Malaysia reported to the World Meteorological Organization (WMO) Typhoon Committee that Tropical Storm Hilda brought heavy rain to Sabah. The rain caused flooding and landslides, and was responsible for five deaths. The mudslides caused about $1.3 million in damage (1999 USD, 15 million 1999 MYR) to roads throughout the country.

=== Tropical Depression Iris (Bebeng) ===
- Tropical depression (JMA)
- Tropical storm (SSHWS)
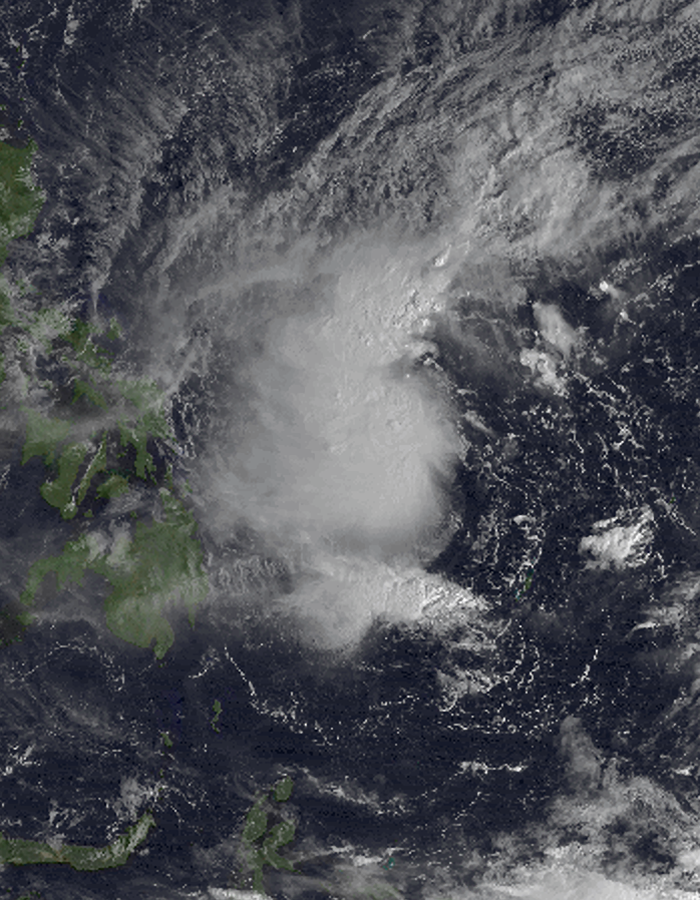
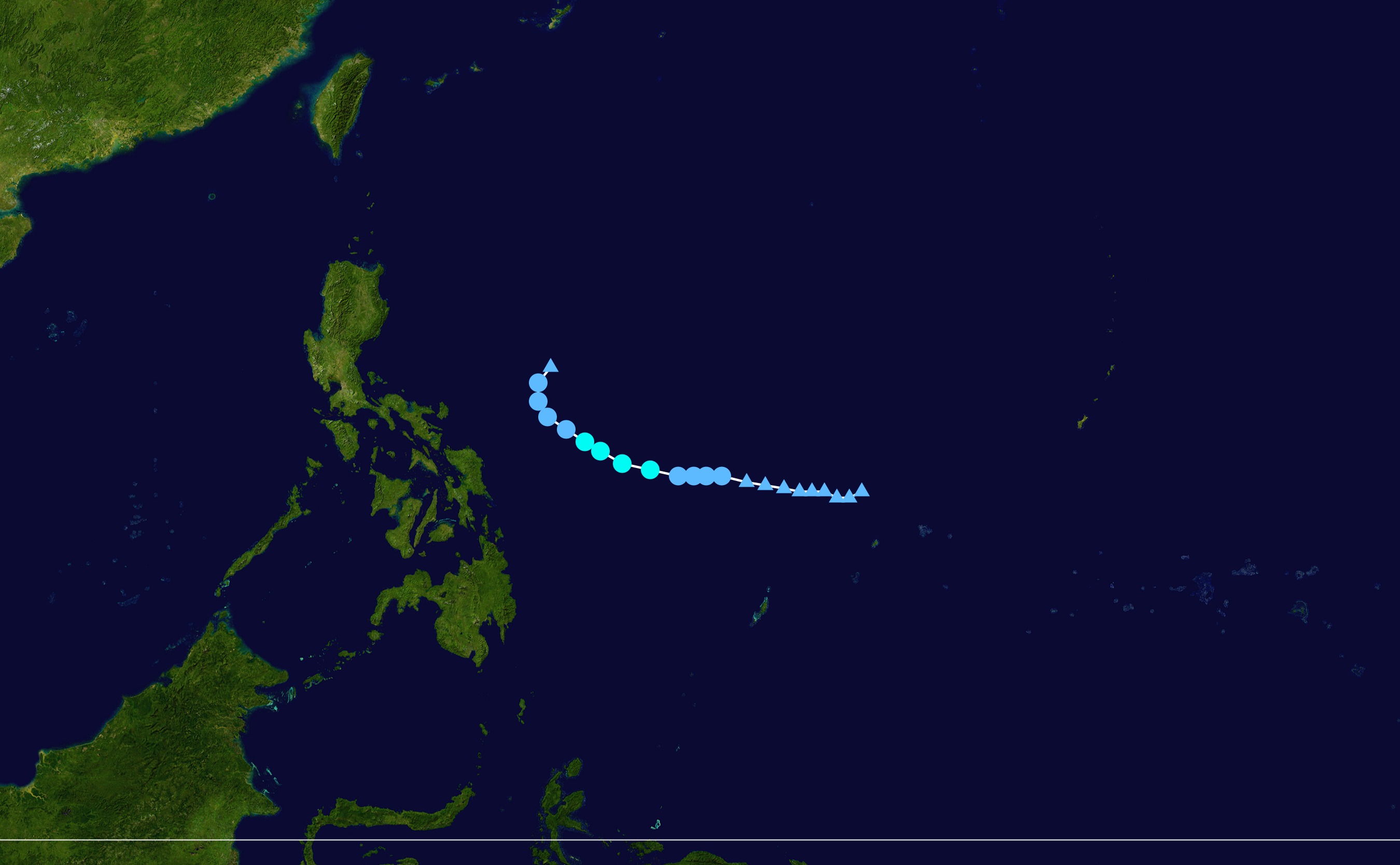
- Duration: February 14 – February 19
- Peak intensity: 55 km/h (35 mph) (10-min); 1000 hPa (mbar)

A monsoon depression began to develop between Pohnpei and Chuuk on February 10 as it moved west. The JTWC issued a TCFA as the depression formed and passed near Palau on February 13. The storm slowly consolidated as it moved towards the Philippines, becoming Tropical Storm Iris on February 17, but did not intensify any further. As the storm turned northwards under the influence of a subtropical ridge to the east it entered a high shear environment and rapidly degenerated, dissipating on February 19 220 km (140 mi) to the east of Luzon.

PAGASA considered this storm to have been a tropical depression and named it Bebeng.

=== Tropical Depression Jacob (Karing) ===
- Tropical depression (JMA)
- Tropical storm (SSHWS)
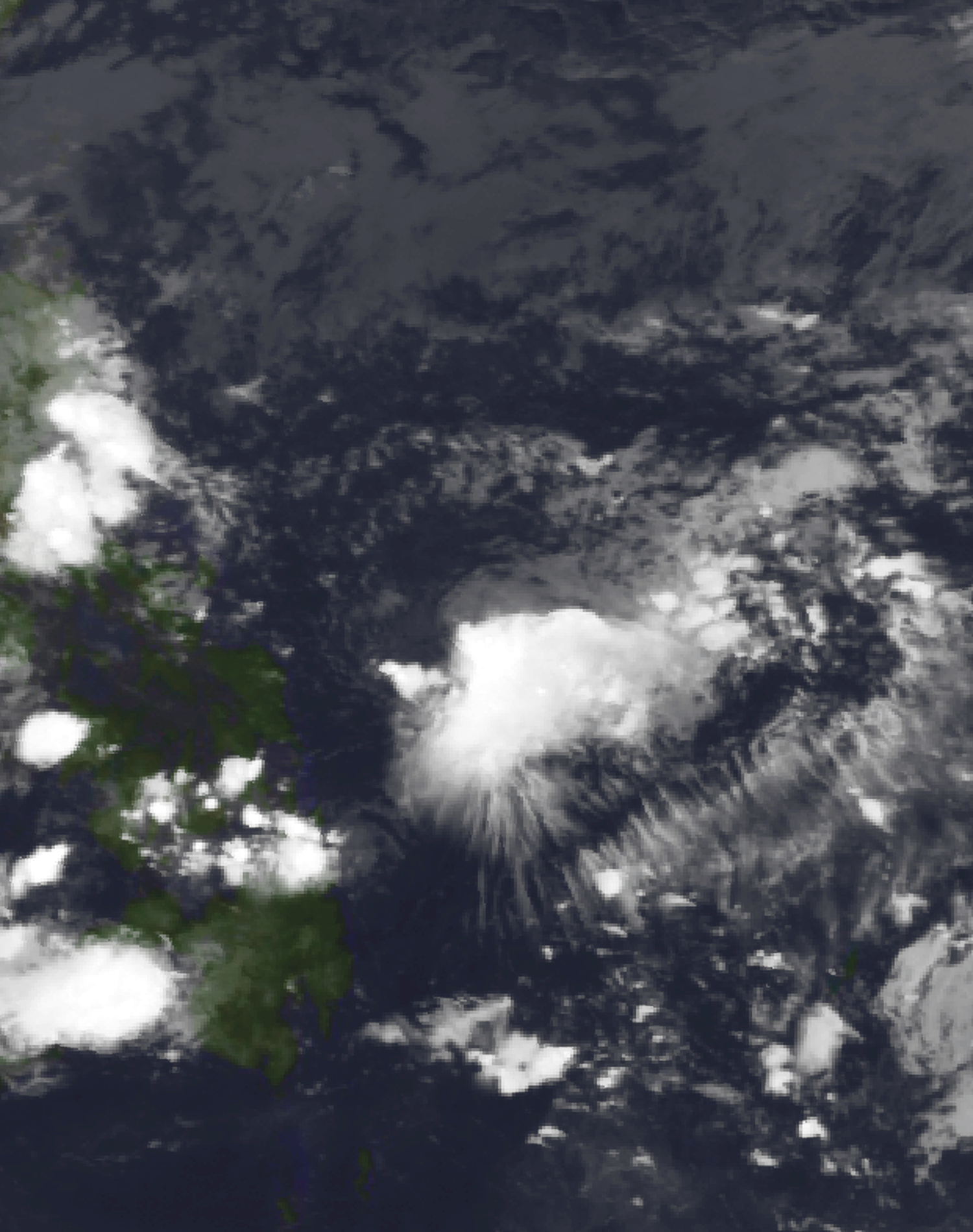
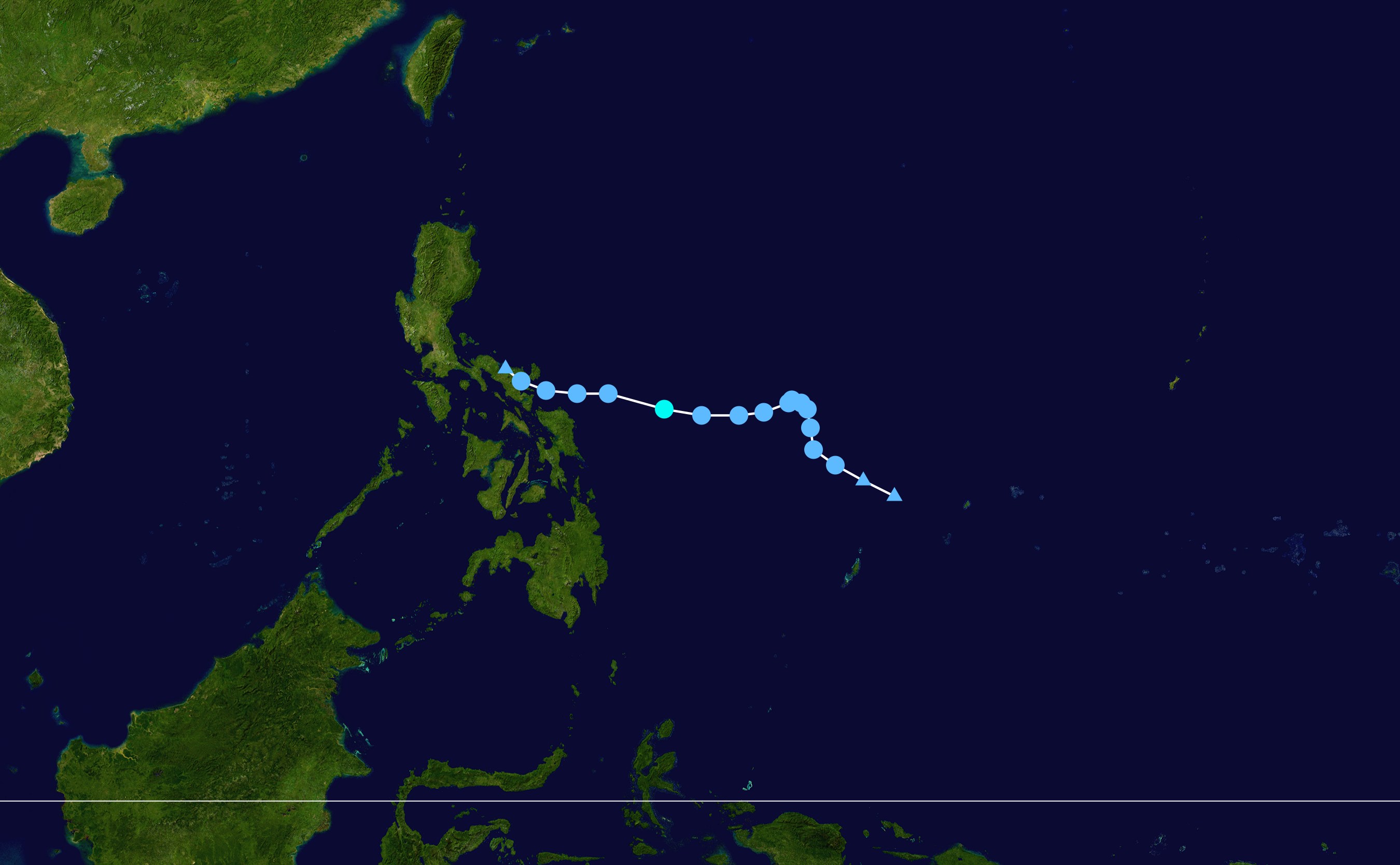
- Duration: April 6 – April 9
- Peak intensity: 55 km/h (35 mph) (10-min); 1006 hPa (mbar)

A low pressure area 220 km (140 mi) to the west of Yap developed into a tropical depression on April 6. It gradually developed as it moved to the west, becoming a strong depression with 55 km/h (34 mph) winds. It then began to accelerate to the northwest, becoming a minimal tropical storm as it did so. However, this northwards motion brought it into a region of increased shear, which weakened it back into a tropical depression. The low level circulation became completely exposed and the weakening system made landfall on southern Luzon on April 10. PAGASA named the system Karing and considered it a tropical depression.

The rainfall from Jacob ranged from 80 mm (3.1 in) up to 400 mm (16 in) in some places in the Philippines, but only minor damage was recorded on land.

=== Severe Tropical Storm Kate (Diding) ===
- Severe tropical storm (JMA)
- Category 1 typhoon (SSHWS)
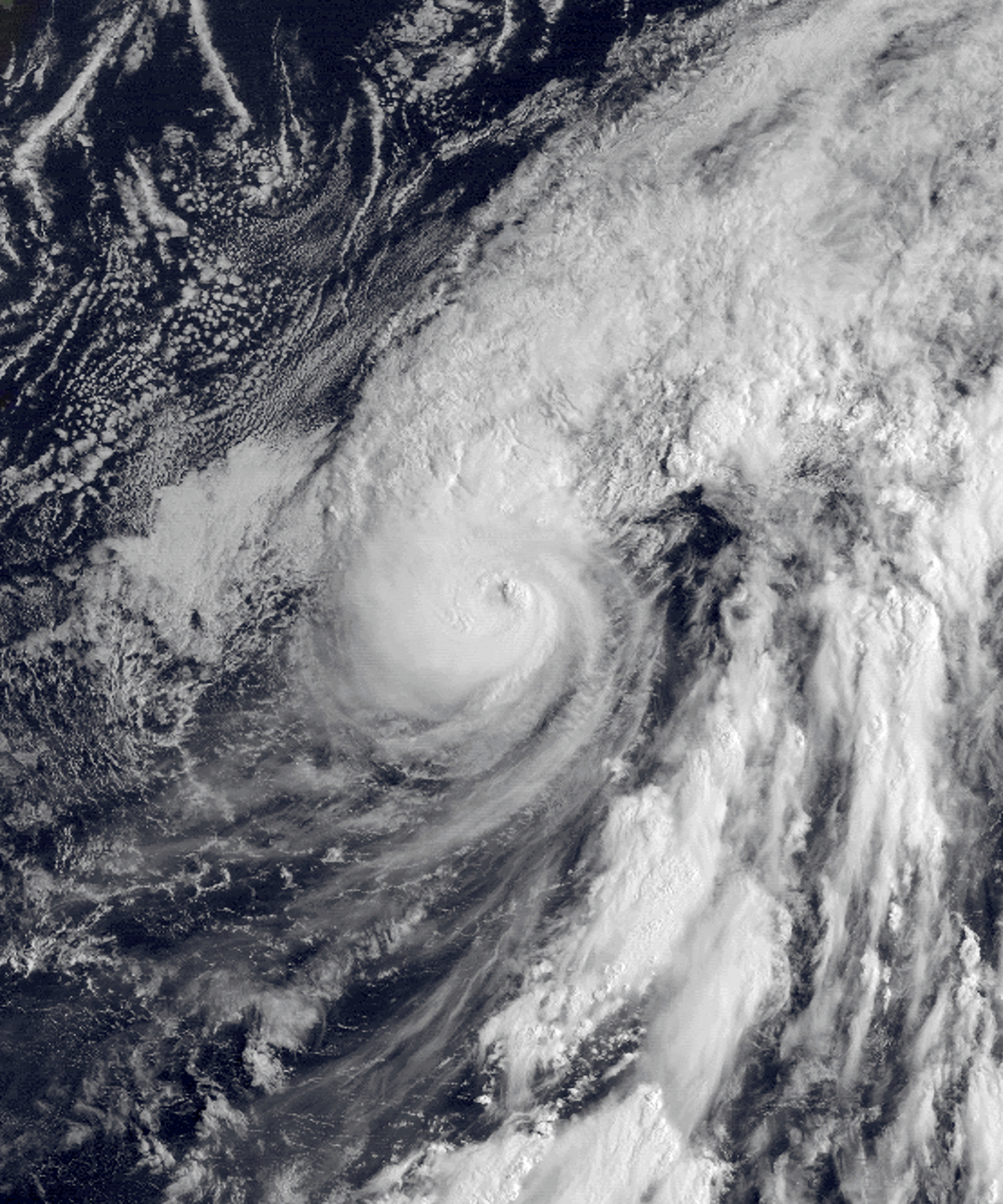
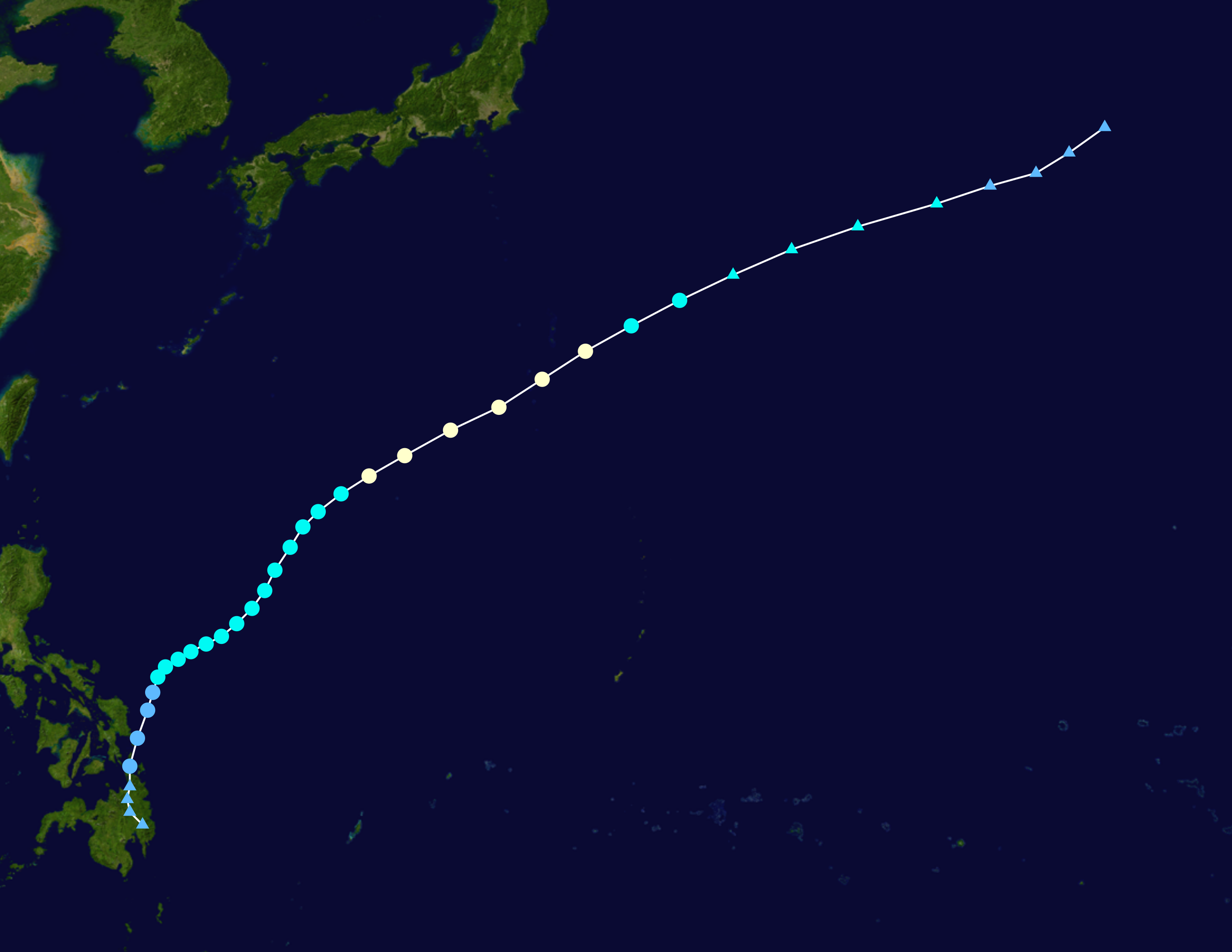
- Duration: April 21 – April 28
- Peak intensity: 100 km/h (65 mph) (10-min); 980 hPa (mbar)

On April 22, a tropical disturbance which had developed in the Philippine Sea moved over Mindanao and intensified into a tropical depression whilst it was still overland. The depression soon moved overwater again as it tracked north to the east of the Philippines, becoming Tropical Storm Kate the next day. The JTWC initially forecast that the storm would only intensify slightly, as they predicted it to move north-northeast into an unfavorable environment. However, Kate instead moved on a more northerly route and entered an area with minimal wind shear. On April 26 Kate became a typhoon, the first of the season, and reached its peak strength with 140 km/h (87 mph) soon after. Later that day, the typhoon's motion accelerated to the northeast and it passed 9 km (5.6 mi) to the north of Iwo Jima. Kate then began to lose its convection and became an extratropical on April 28 to the northeast of Iwo Jima.

Both JMA and PAGASA considered Kate to have been a tropical storm at its peak, in both cases considering this the first tropical storm of the season. PAGASA named the depression Diding soon after it formed and upgraded it to a tropical storm before the JTWC. Kate brought torrential rain to the east-central Philippines, with amounts as high as 360 mm (14 in) falling in places. The peak winds recorded on Iwo Jima were 95 km/h (59 mph), with gusts of up to 126 km/h (78 mph).

=== Typhoon Leo ===
- Typhoon (JMA)
- Category 3 typhoon (SSHWS)
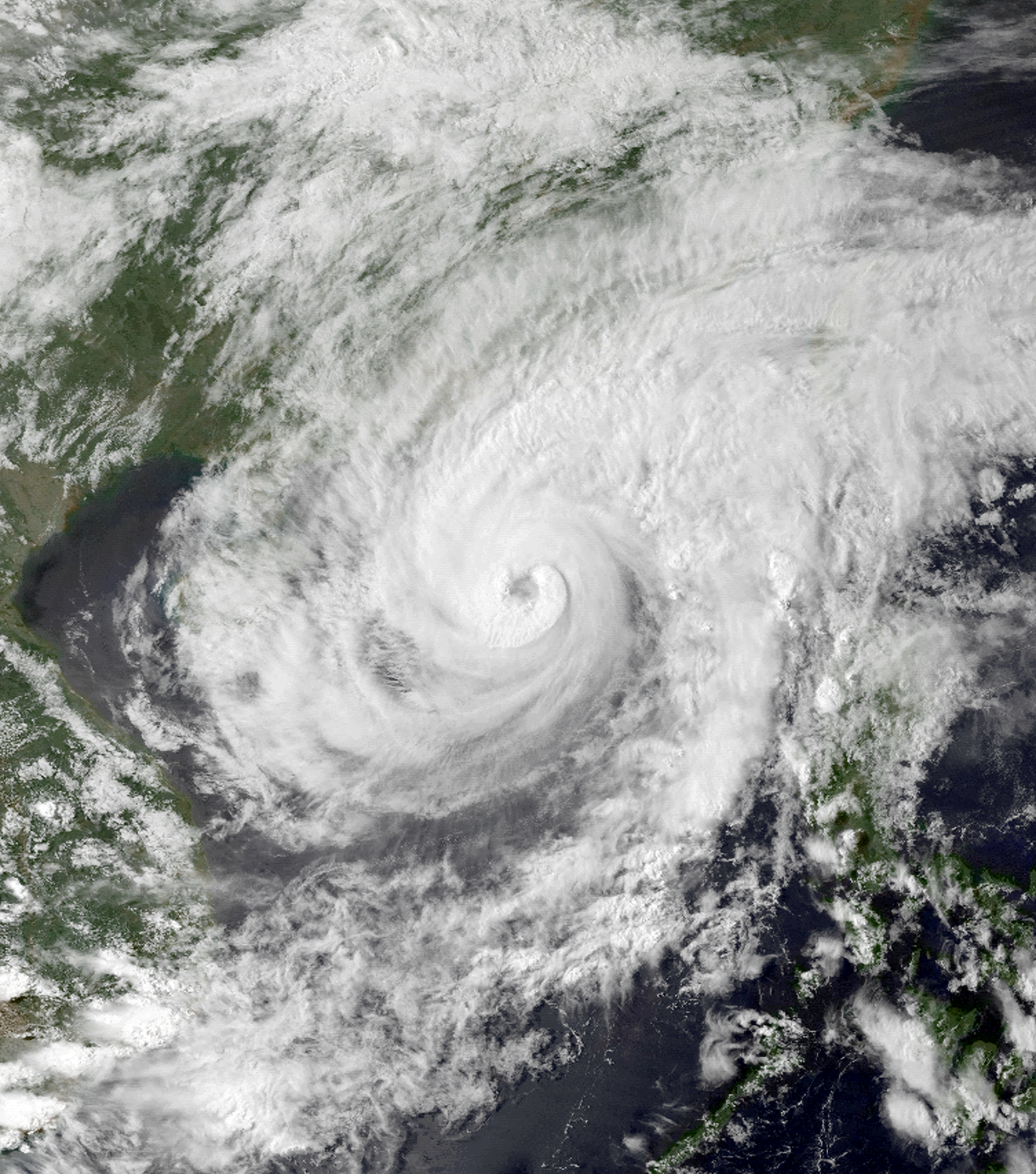
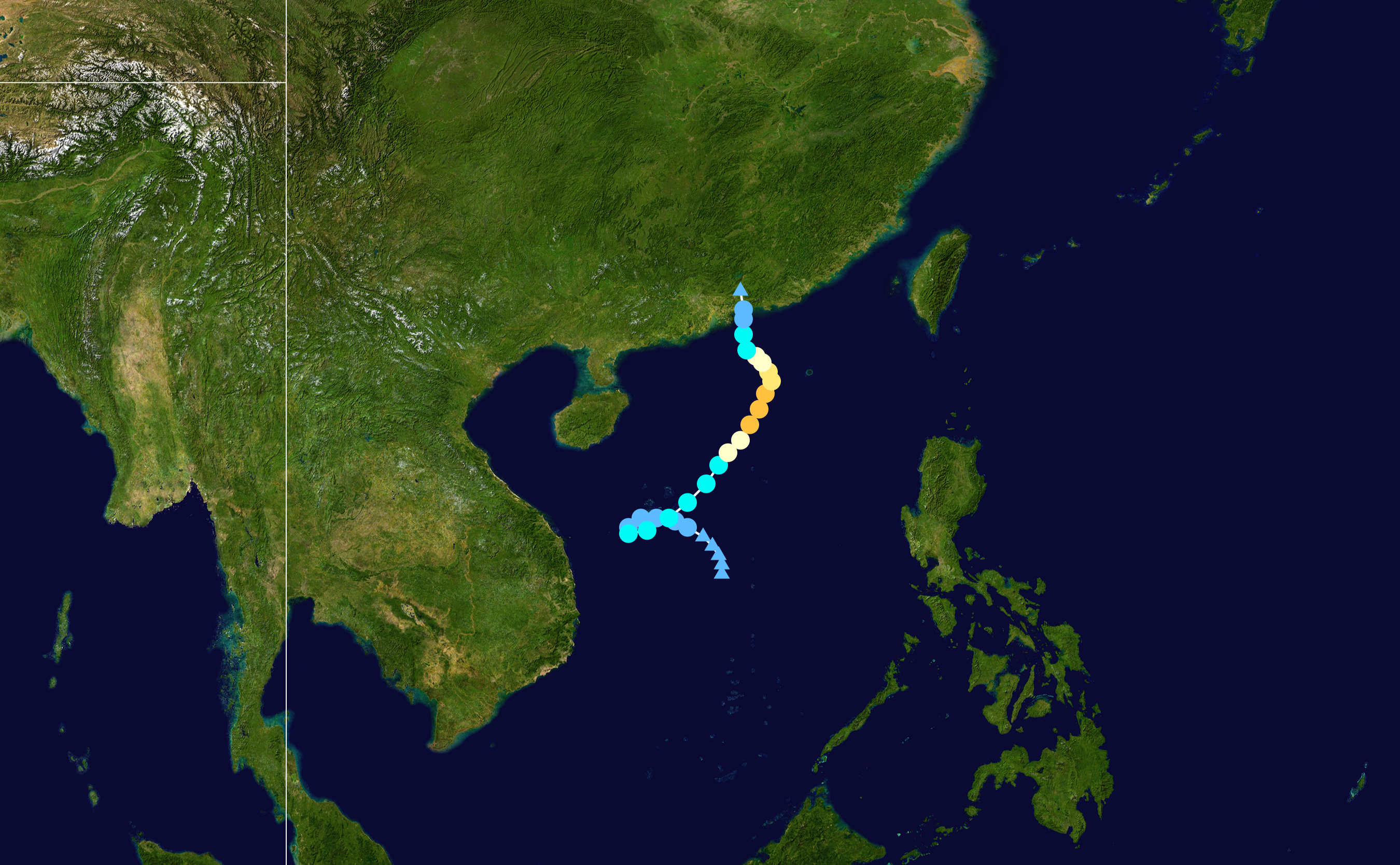
- Duration: April 27 – May 2
- Peak intensity: 120 km/h (75 mph) (10-min); 970 hPa (mbar)

In late April a circulation began to develop within a monsoon depression in the South China Sea, forming into a tropical depression on April 27 when it was 710 km (440 mi) to the west of Manila. It strengthened as it moved to the west and became Tropical Storm Leo the next day. The storm then performed a cyclonic loop off the Vietnamese coast and began to intensify, becoming a typhoon as it moved to the northeast. As it moved towards China under a high-level ridge Typhoon Leo rapidly intensified to its peak with 205 km/h (127 mph) winds. However, it did not sustain this for long as it then moved northeast into a high shear environment and it weakened as it moved to the north. Leo made landfall on May 2 as a tropical depression. By this time, its convection had become separated from its circulation. Shortly afterwards, Leo dissipated overland.

As Typhoon Leo was developing, its outer rainbands brought up to 130 mm (5.1 in) to regions of Vietnam. High waves caused by the typhoon sank a ship to the south of Hong Kong and only 7 of the 21 people on board were rescued. Peak sustained winds of 90 km/h (56 mph) were recorded on Waglan Island as Typhoon Leo passed to the south of Hong Kong and the storm dropped over 100 mm (3.9 in) of rain on the territory. There was only light damage in Hong Kong as a result of Typhoon Leo, but the rainfall was responsible for 14 injuries, mostly in traffic accidents.

=== Typhoon Maggie (Etang) ===
- Typhoon (JMA)
- Category 3 typhoon (SSHWS)
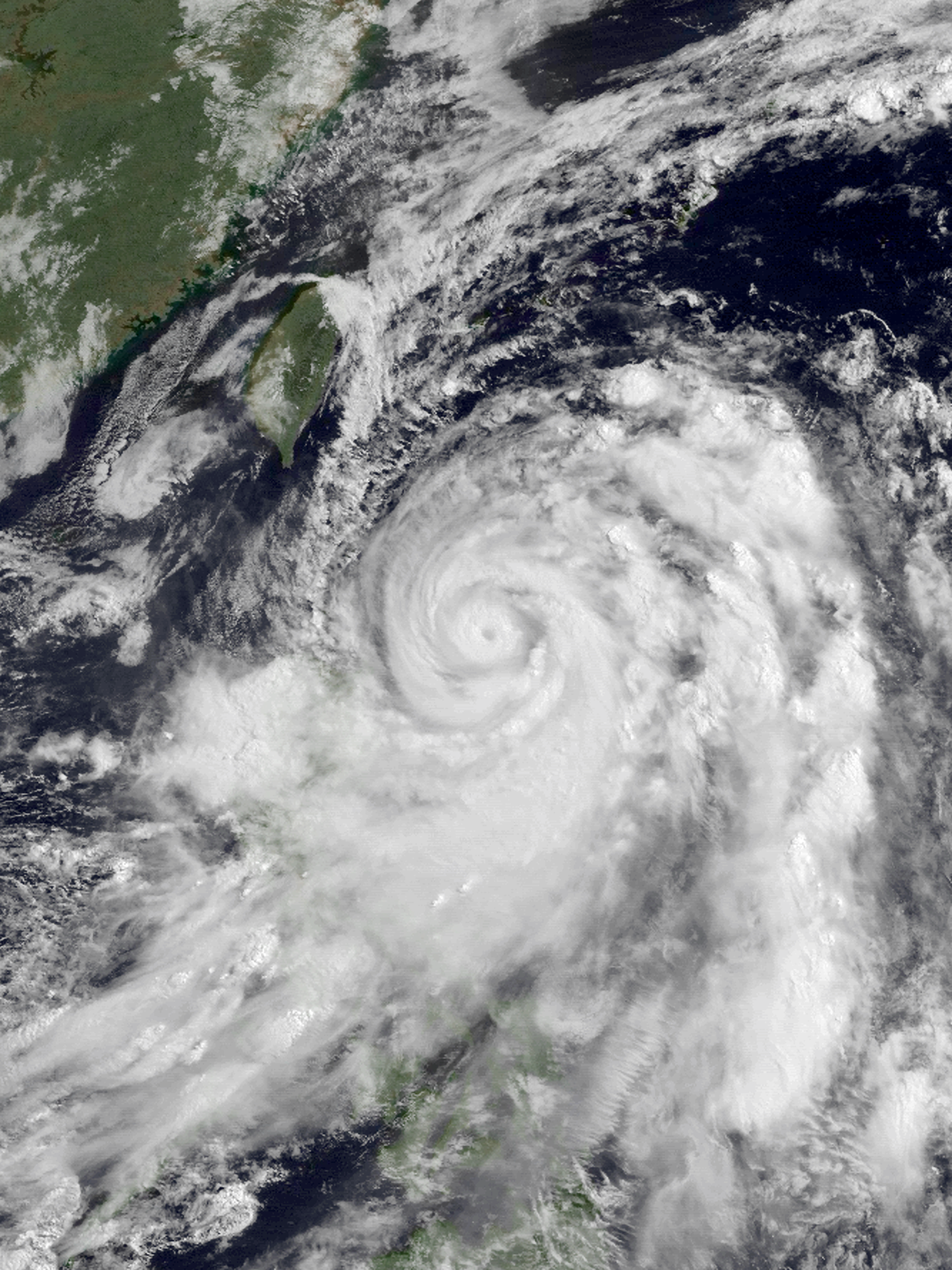
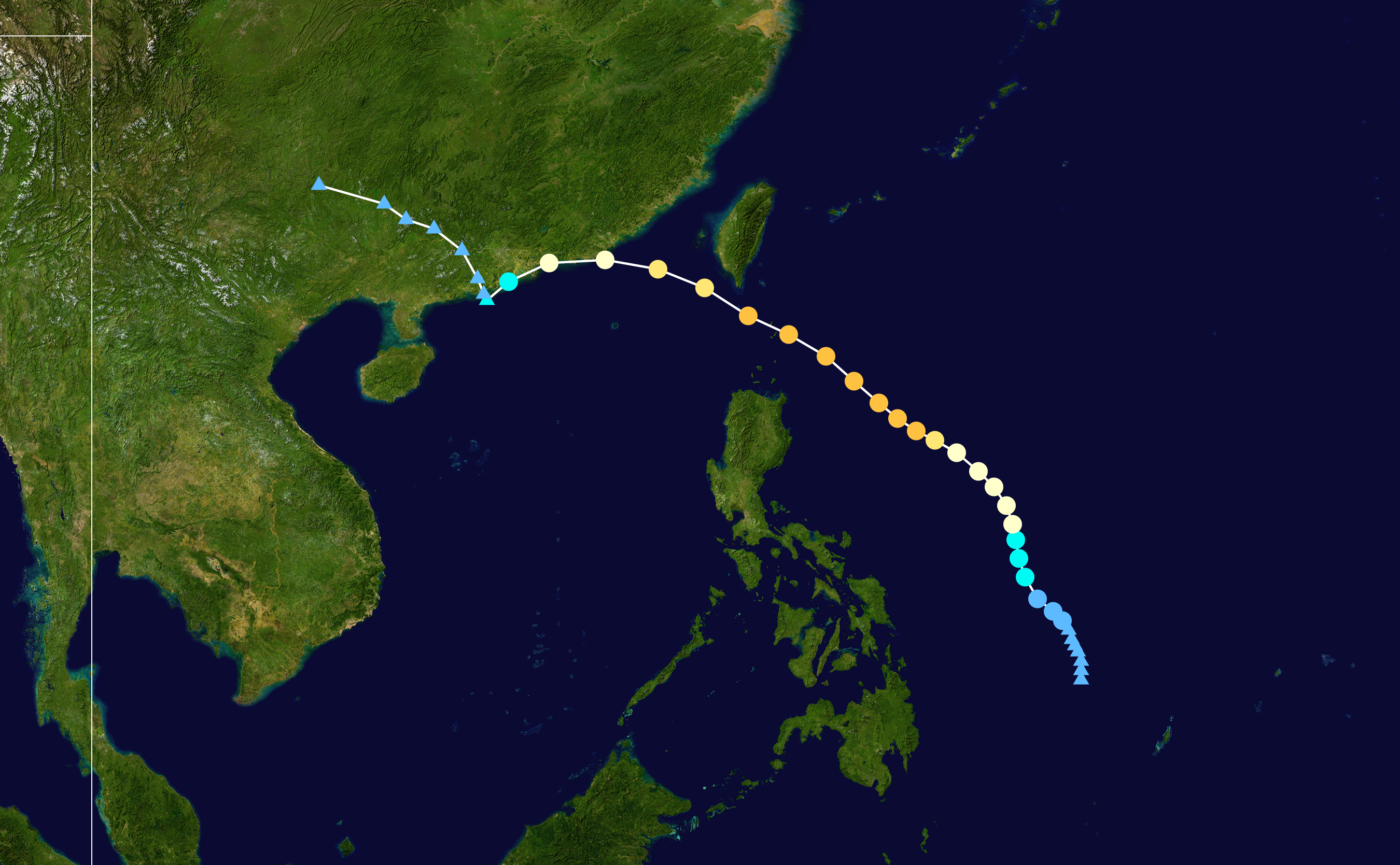
- Duration: June 1 – June 9
- Peak intensity: 140 km/h (85 mph) (10-min); 955 hPa (mbar)

The sixth tropical depression of the season formed in the monsoon trough to the east of the Philippines on June 1. The system intensified as it moved to the north, becoming Typhoon Maggie 36 hours after it had formed. The typhoon intensified further as it began to head to the northwest into the Luzon Strait and it reached its peak with 195 km/h (121 mph) winds on June 5. The typhoon turned further to the west as it began to interact with Taiwan and started to weaken slowly. Maggie made landfall as a 150 km/h (93 mph) typhoon in southeastern China, to the east of Hong Kong on June 6. The storm then moved along the Chinese coast weakening as it did so. Maggie passed just to the north of Hong Kong before it turned into the mouth of the Pearl River and dissipated inland on June 8. Both the JMA and PAGASA considered Maggie a typhoon, and PAGASA named this storm Etang.

The rainfall from Typhoon Maggie caused landslides in the Philippines that killed three people. The storm killed at least two people, with another five reported missing on Taiwan. The electricity supply to over 100,000 homes was cut off and there was over $18 million of agricultural damage on the island. Maggie brought sustained winds of up to 80 km/h (50 mph) and 85 mm (3.3 in) of rain to Hong Kong. Two oil barges docked in the territory sank, one fully laden with oil which polluted a nearby beach. There were five injuries resulting from Maggie in the territory and the total damages were approximately $100,000. The typhoon killed four people and damaged over 3000 homes in Guangdong. At least 120 vessels were also damaged and there was more than $150 million of direct economic damage in the province. Maggie also brought rain of up to 100 mm (3.9 in) to northern Vietnam, causing some localised flooding.

=== Tropical Storm 07W ===
- Tropical storm (JMA)
- Tropical depression (SSHWS)
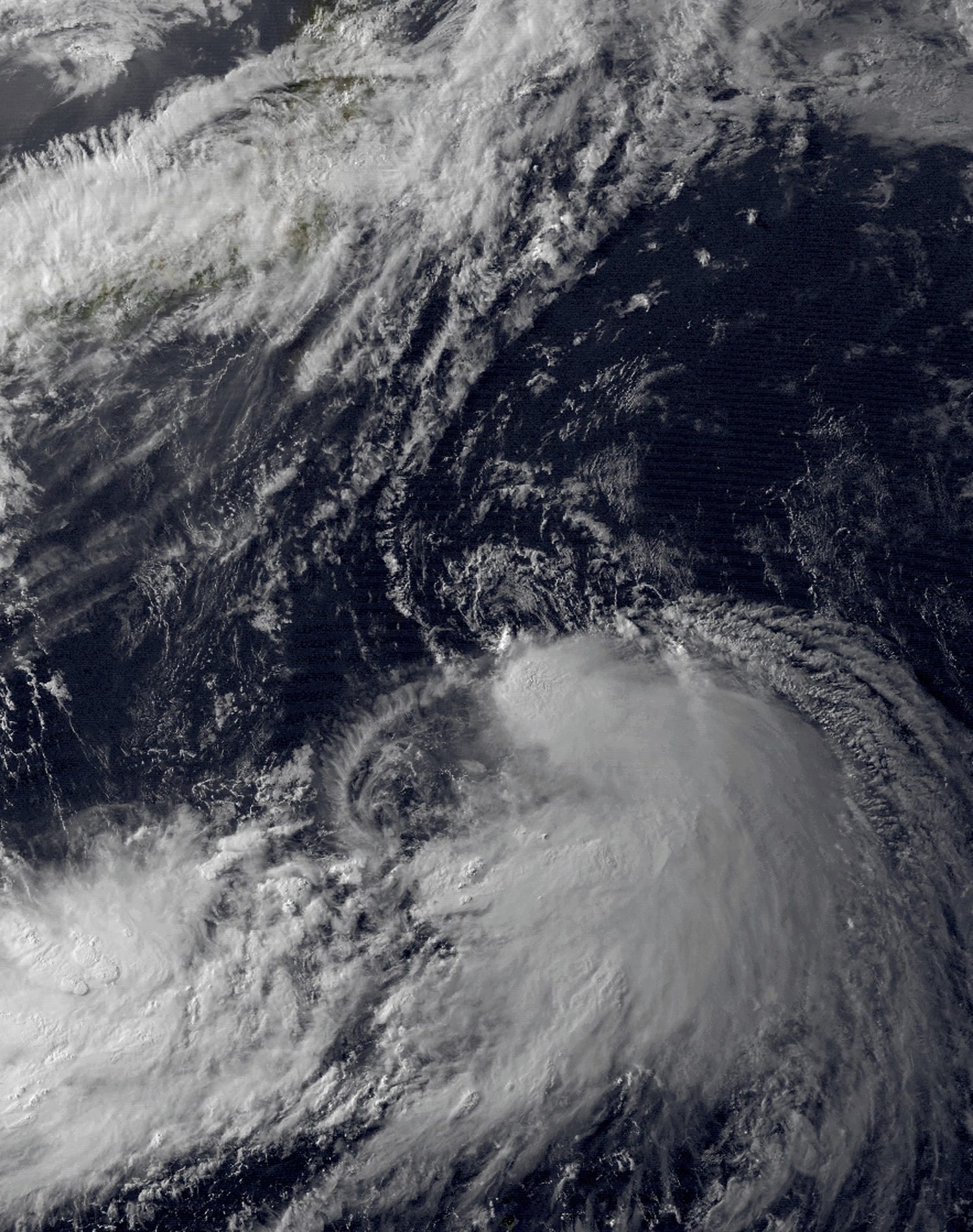
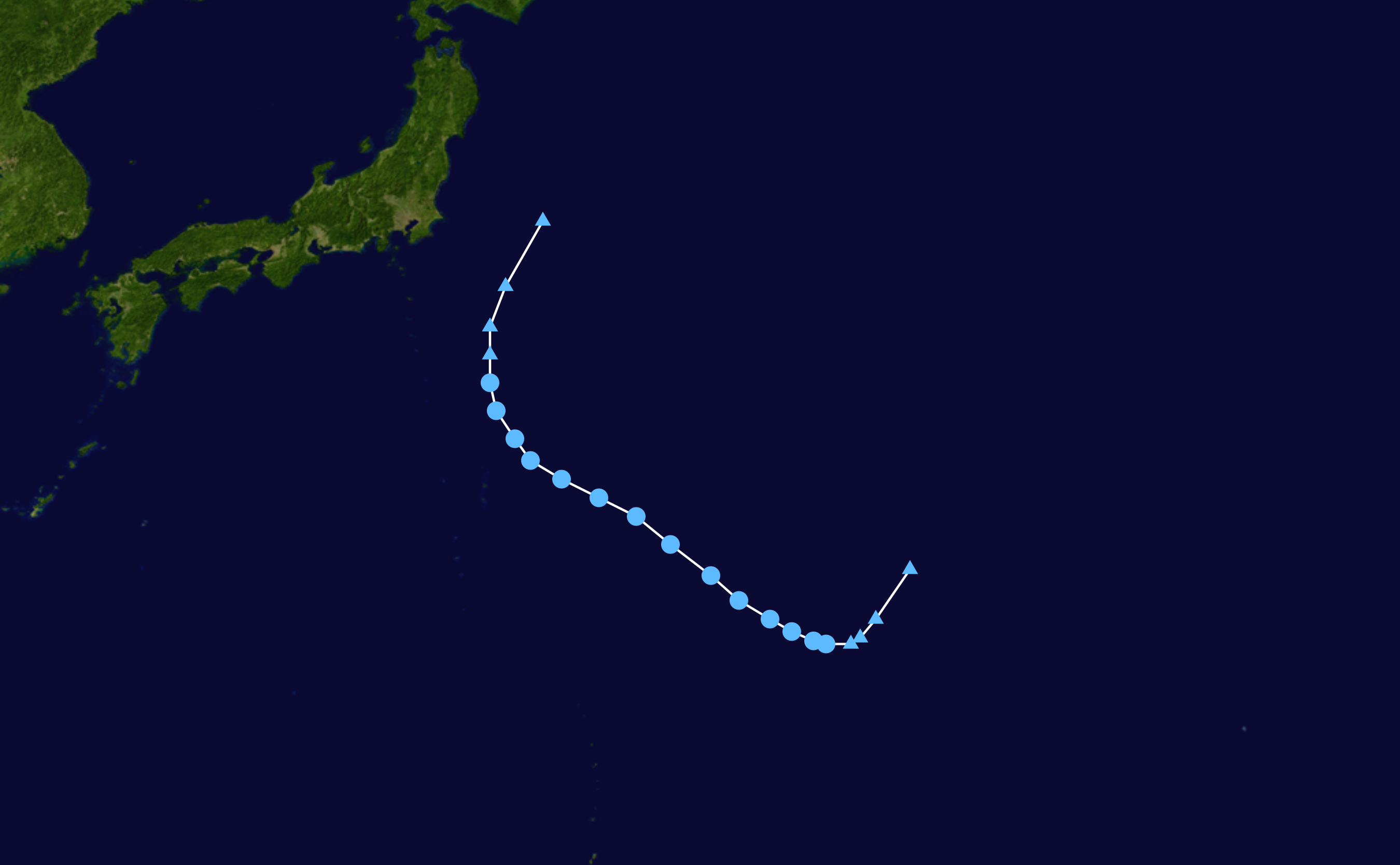
- Duration: July 14 – July 18
- Peak intensity: 65 km/h (40 mph) (10-min); 996 hPa (mbar)

An area of disturbed weather to the northeast of Guam slowly developed as it moved to the west, becoming a tropical depression on July 14. Soon after it formed the depression reached its peak strength with 10-minute winds of 65 km/h (40 mph), which it maintained for two days as it moved towards Honshū. Although the JMA classified the depression as a tropical storm, the JTWC did not follow suit. Not long after peak intensity, increased wind shear began to expose the low level circulation and the depression began to weaken as it turned to the northeast. The depression dissipated on July 18 to the southeast of Honshū.

=== Tropical Depression 08W ===
- Tropical depression (SSHWS)
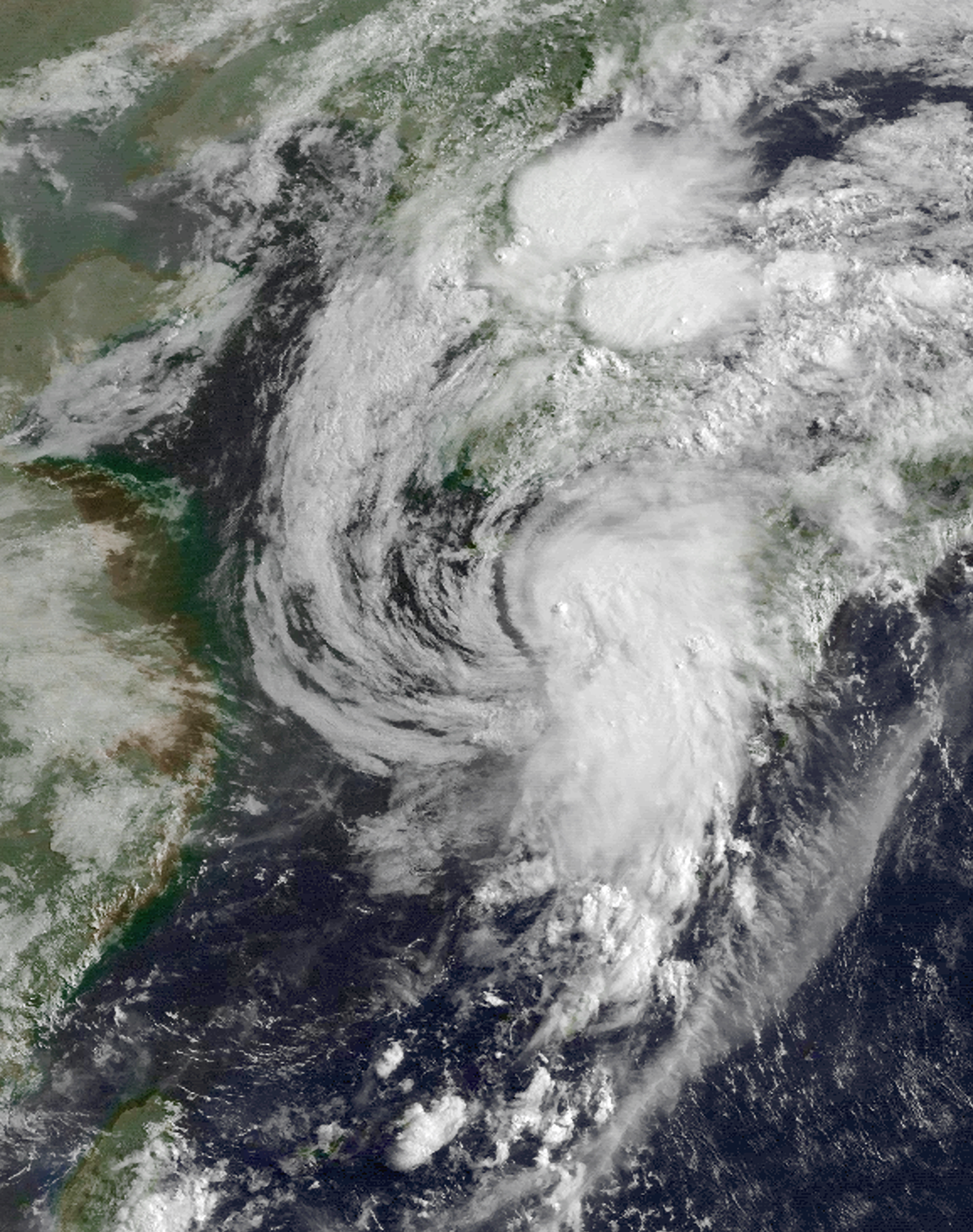
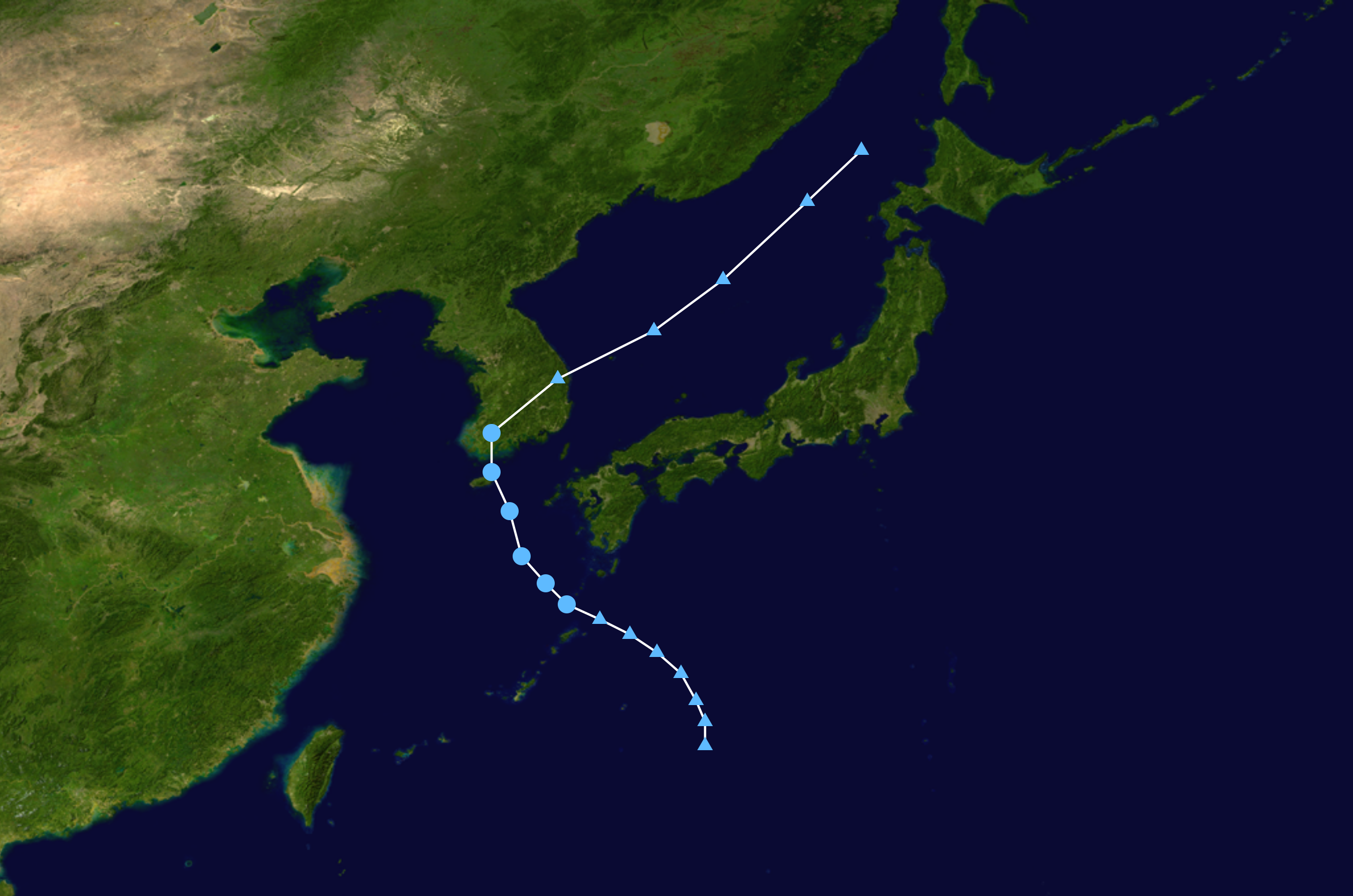
- Duration: July 19 – July 23
- Peak intensity: 55 km/h (35 mph) (1-min); 1004 hPa (mbar)

A tropical disturbance moving north to the east of Okinawa, Japan gradually developed as it moved to the north towards the Japanese mainland. On July 21 it began to intensify, becoming Tropical Depression 08W to the northeast of Okinawa. The depression strengthened slightly in the East China Sea before it made landfall near Changhung, South Korea on July 22. The storm became extratropical as it moved over the Korean Peninsula and it entered the Sea of Japan, where it dissipated.

=== Severe Tropical Storm Neil (Helming) ===
- Severe tropical storm (JMA)
- Tropical storm (SSHWS)
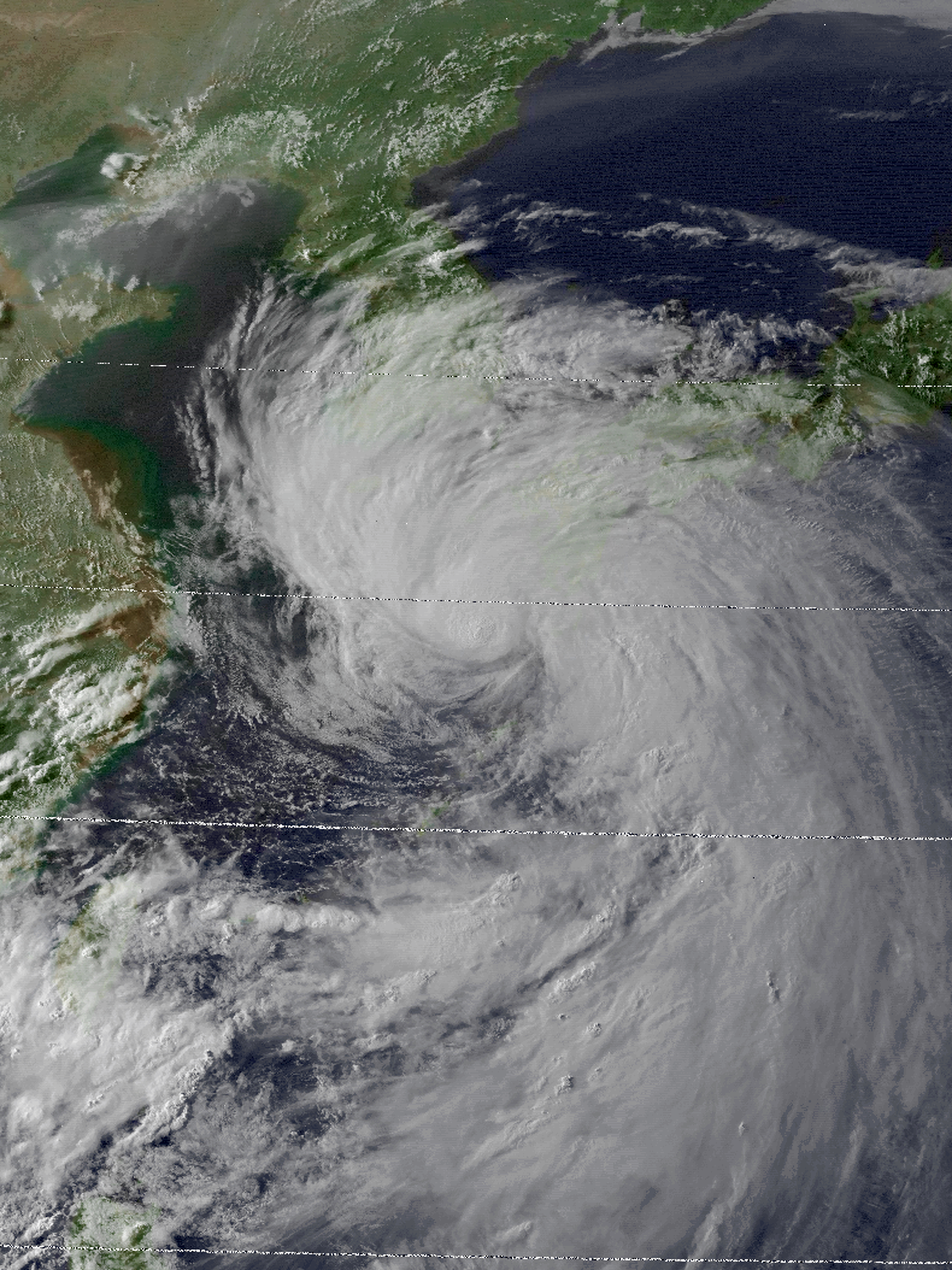
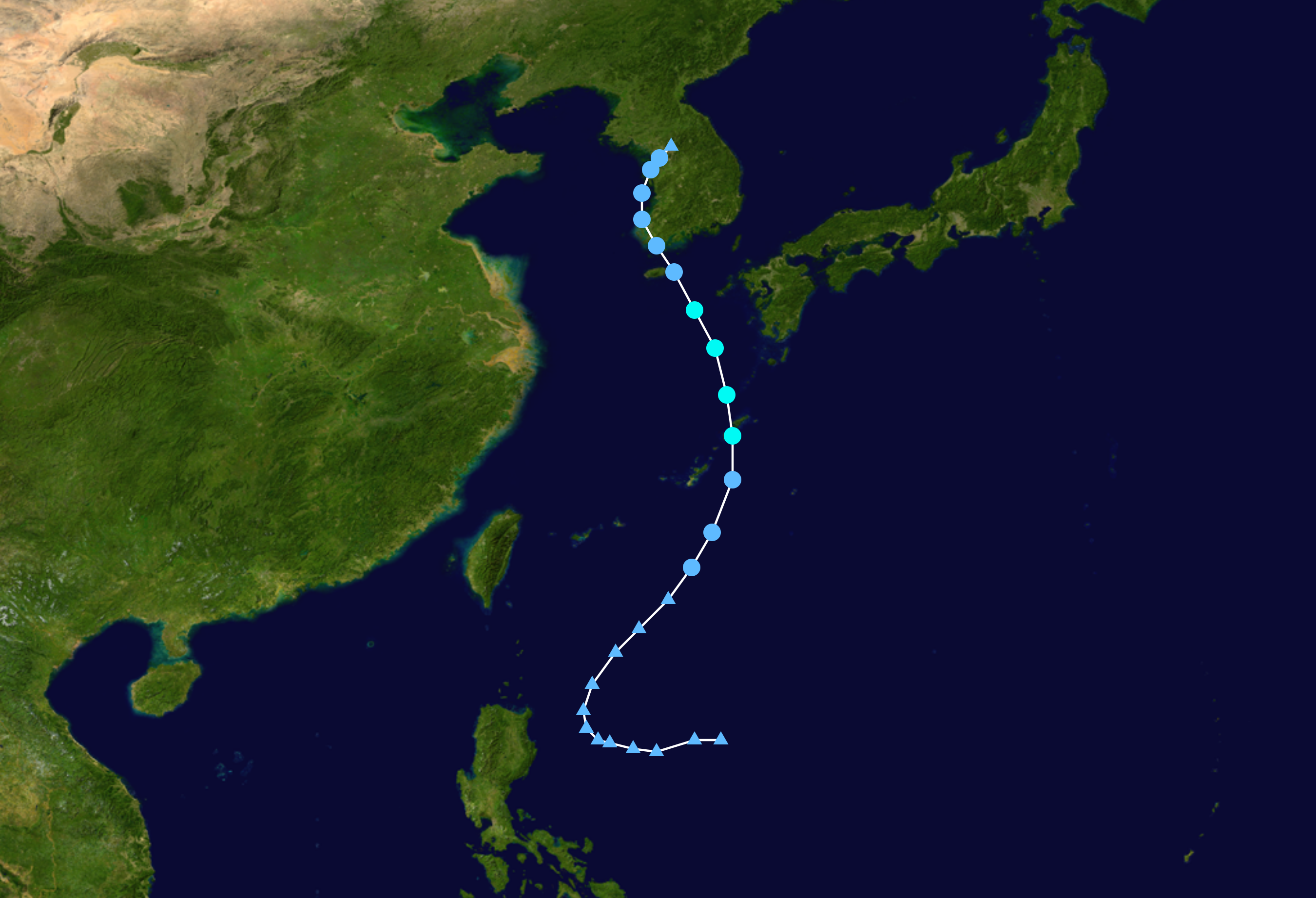
- Duration: July 22 – July 28
- Peak intensity: 95 km/h (60 mph) (10-min); 980 hPa (mbar)

On July 23, a disturbance began to form in the Philippine Sea within the monsoon trough. The convection gradually consolidated as the disturbance moved north and the ninth tropical depression of the season formed on July 25 south of Okinawa. The depression passed near to the Japanese island and soon strengthened into Tropical Storm Neil. The storm turned slightly westward towards the Korean peninsula and reached its peak strength with 75 km/h (47 mph) winds on July 26. Neil made landfall to the southwest of Suncheon the next day as a minimal tropical storm and soon reemerged over the Yellow Sea as a tropical depression. There it interacted with a mid-latitude trough, that redirected back towards South Korea and it made a second landfall 35 km (22 mi) southwest of Seoul on July 28. Neil then quickly dissipated overland.

Both the JMA and PAGASA considered Neil a tropical storm, with PAGASA naming it Helming. Unusually, PAGASA assessed the storm as having reached a peak on July 22, when the JTWC still considered it a developing disturbance. This difference was due to a difference in opinion between the two centers as to where the storm's center was. There were reports of damage from flooding and winds gusts from Tropical Storm Neil in Japan, with a ferry running aground near Kannoura. Neil caused a fishing boat off the Korean coast to capsize, killing its crew of eight. There were wind gusts of up to 95 km/h (59 mph) on Cheju Island and the peak rainfall reported from the storm was over 200 mm (7.9 in). Agricultural damage in Niigata prefecture totaled to ¥693 million (US$6.09 million). As the storm dissipated over Korea, it caused flash floods that killed at least seven and left 7,000 homeless.

=== Tropical Storm 10W ===
- Tropical storm (JMA)
- Tropical depression (SSHWS)
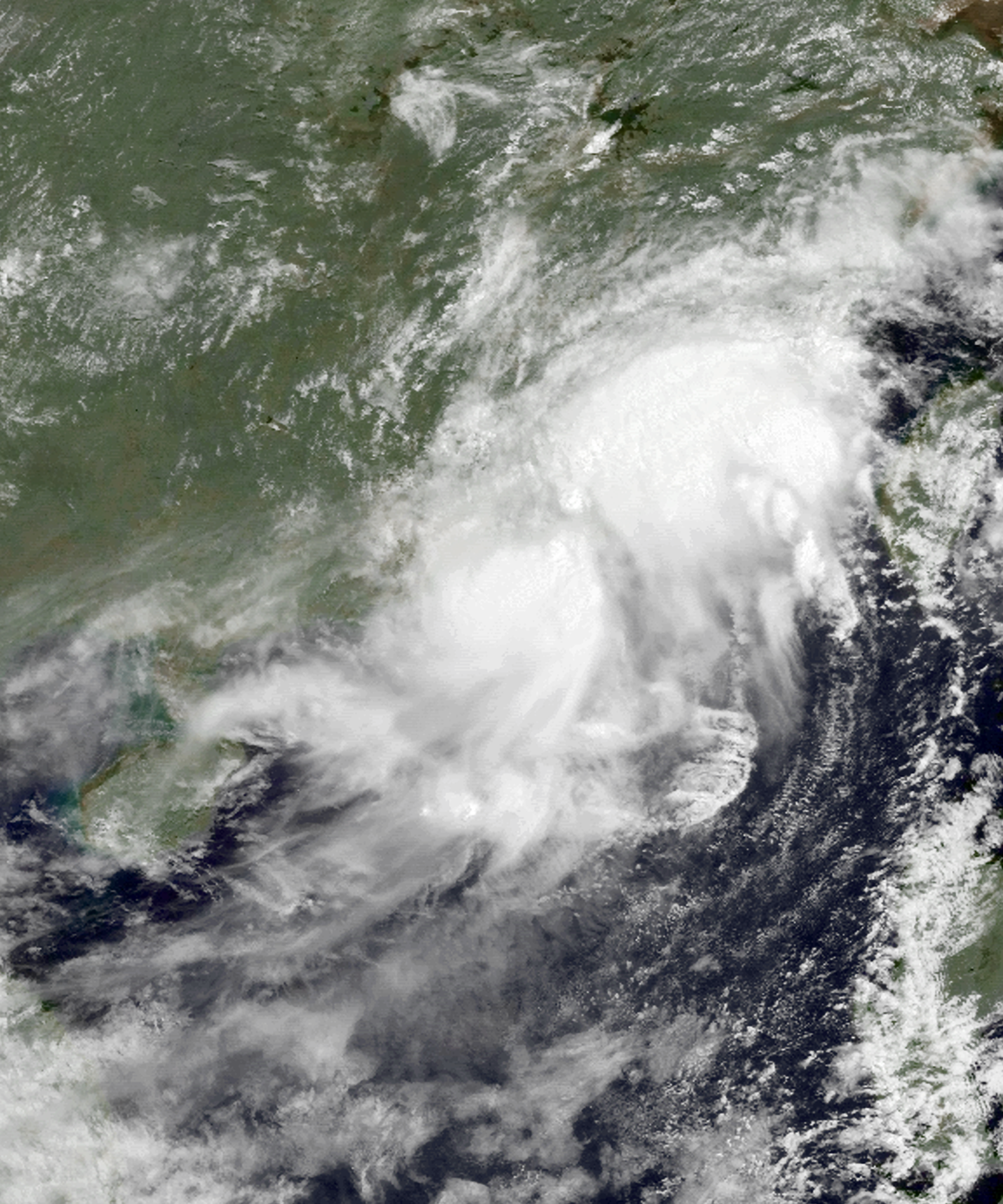
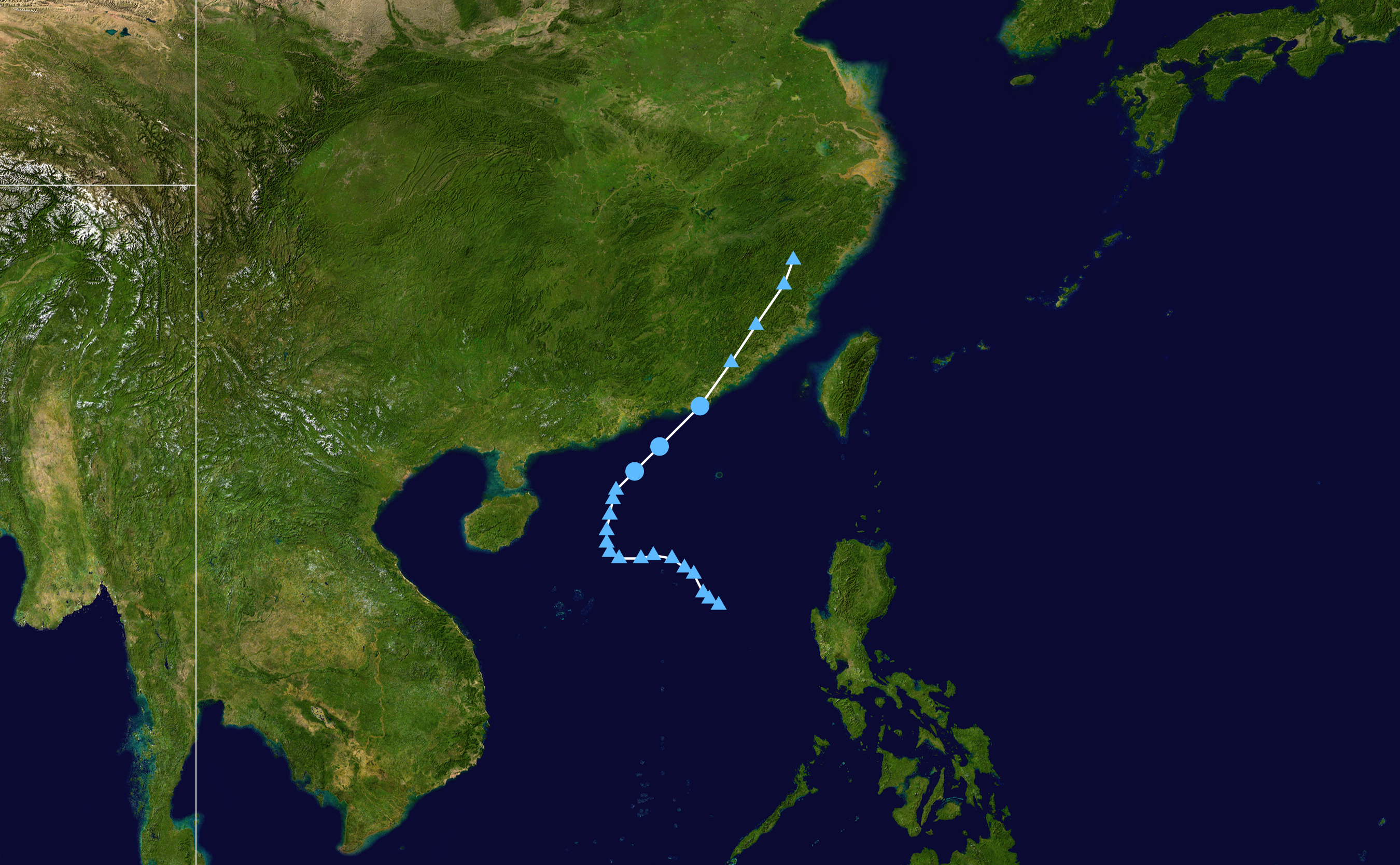
- Duration: July 23 – July 28
- Peak intensity: 75 km/h (45 mph) (10-min); 985 hPa (mbar)

A tropical disturbance began to develop in the South China Sea on July 23. It formed the same monsoon trough that Tropical Storm Neil developed from to the east. The disturbance became a tropical depression late on July 25 as it turned to the north towards the Chinese coast. It did not strengthen any further and made landfall near Shanwei as a minimal tropical depression on July 27. The depression then moved inland and dissipated. The JMA considered Tropical Depression 10W to be a tropical storm, with peak 10-minute winds of 75 km/h (47 mph), making 10W the second storm in 1999 that the JMA considered a tropical storm but the JTWC considered a depression.

As the depression passed near Hong Kong, it dropped 31 mm (1.2 in) of rain on the territory and sustained winds of 72 km/h (45 mph) were recorded on Waglan Island. There was no significant damage over land in the territory, though 18 swimmers were injured in the strong seas associated with the storm.

=== Typhoon Olga (Ising) ===
- Typhoon (JMA)
- Category 1 typhoon (SSHWS)
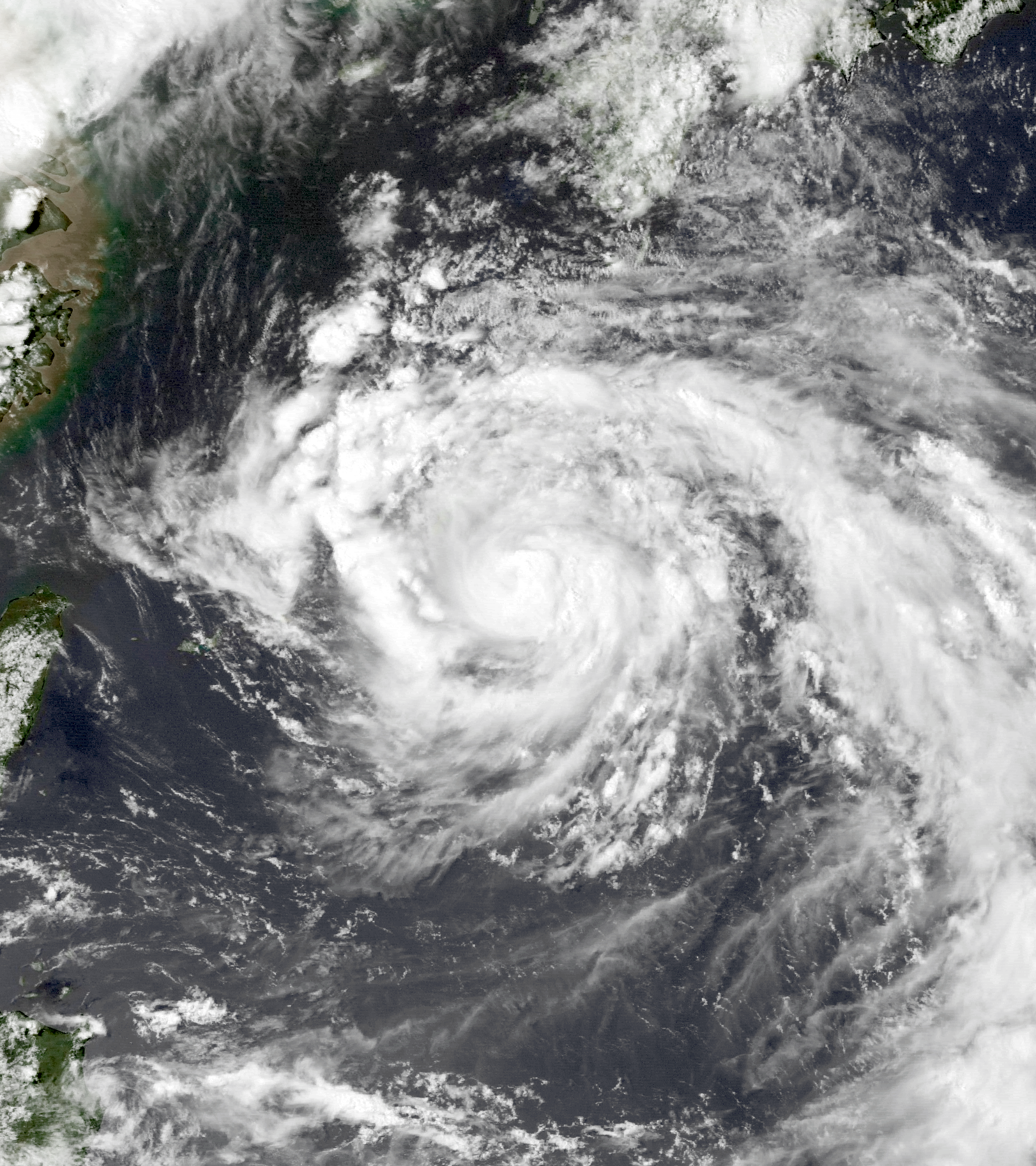
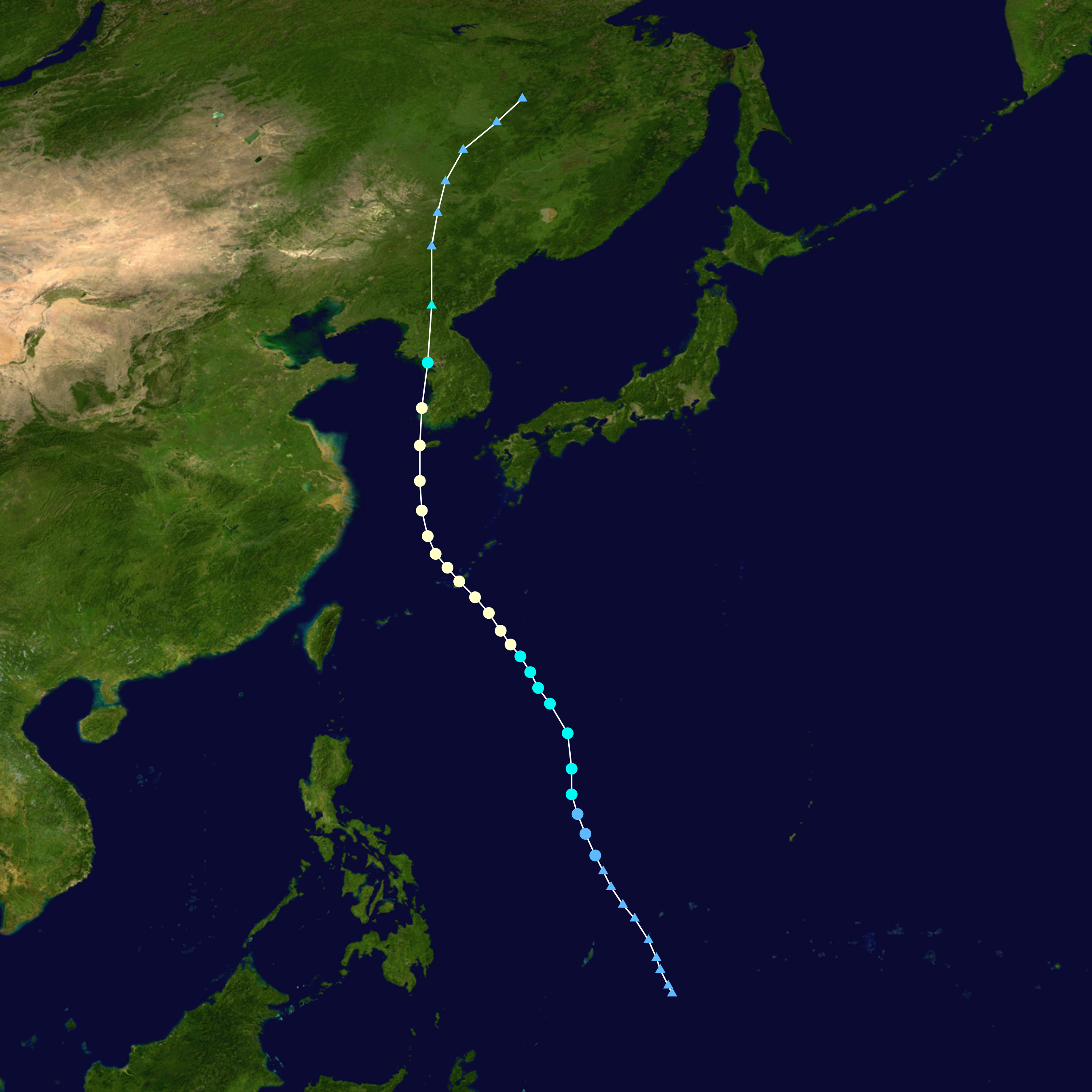
- Duration: July 29 – August 3
- Peak intensity: 120 km/h (75 mph) (10-min); 970 hPa (mbar)

On July 26, a disturbance began to develop at the eastern end of a well-defined monsoon trough well to the east of the Philippines. The convection within the disturbance increased as it moved to the north and Tropical Depression 11W formed on July 29. The system continued to intensify, becoming Typhoon Olga two days later as it approached Okinawa. On August 1 Olga made landfall on the Japanese island as a typhoon, weakening slightly as it passed over the island. As it moved to the north-northwest it intensified to its peak with 150 km/h (93 mph) winds as it approached Korea. The storm was beginning to weaken as it passed to the west of Cheju Island on August 3 and it made a second brief landfall on the T'aean Peninsula before moving north in the Yellow Sea. The storm made its final landfall in North Korea as a strong tropical storm later that day with 100 km/h (62 mph) winds and became extratropical soon after. Both the JMA and PAGASA considered Olga a typhoon, with PAGASA naming the storm Ising before the JTWC issued its first warning on the developing system.

Although Typhoon Olga never approached the Philippines closely, it was responsible for heavy rains over much of Luzon that killed 160 people and displaced 80,000. Olga passed over Okinawa, with winds of 80 km/h (50 mph) recorded at Kadena Air Base, causing minimal damage. Torrential rain of up to 600 mm (24 in) fell on the Korean Peninsula, with the highest totals falling near the border between North and South Korea. The resulting floods and landslides caused 64 fatalities in South Korea and wind gusts of 96 km/h (60 mph) were reported near Seoul. The flooding in South Korea destroyed about 400 km^{2} (150 sq mi) of rice paddies and 8,500 homes, leaving 25,000 people homeless. The Red Cross reported a further 42 deaths and 40,000 were made homeless from flooding in North Korea. That same flooding worsened the ongoing food shortages across the country. Typhoon Olga brought the heaviest rains recorded in Korea for 25 years and caused a total of $657 million of damage in South Korea.

=== Tropical Storm Paul ===
- Tropical storm (JMA)
- Tropical storm (SSHWS)
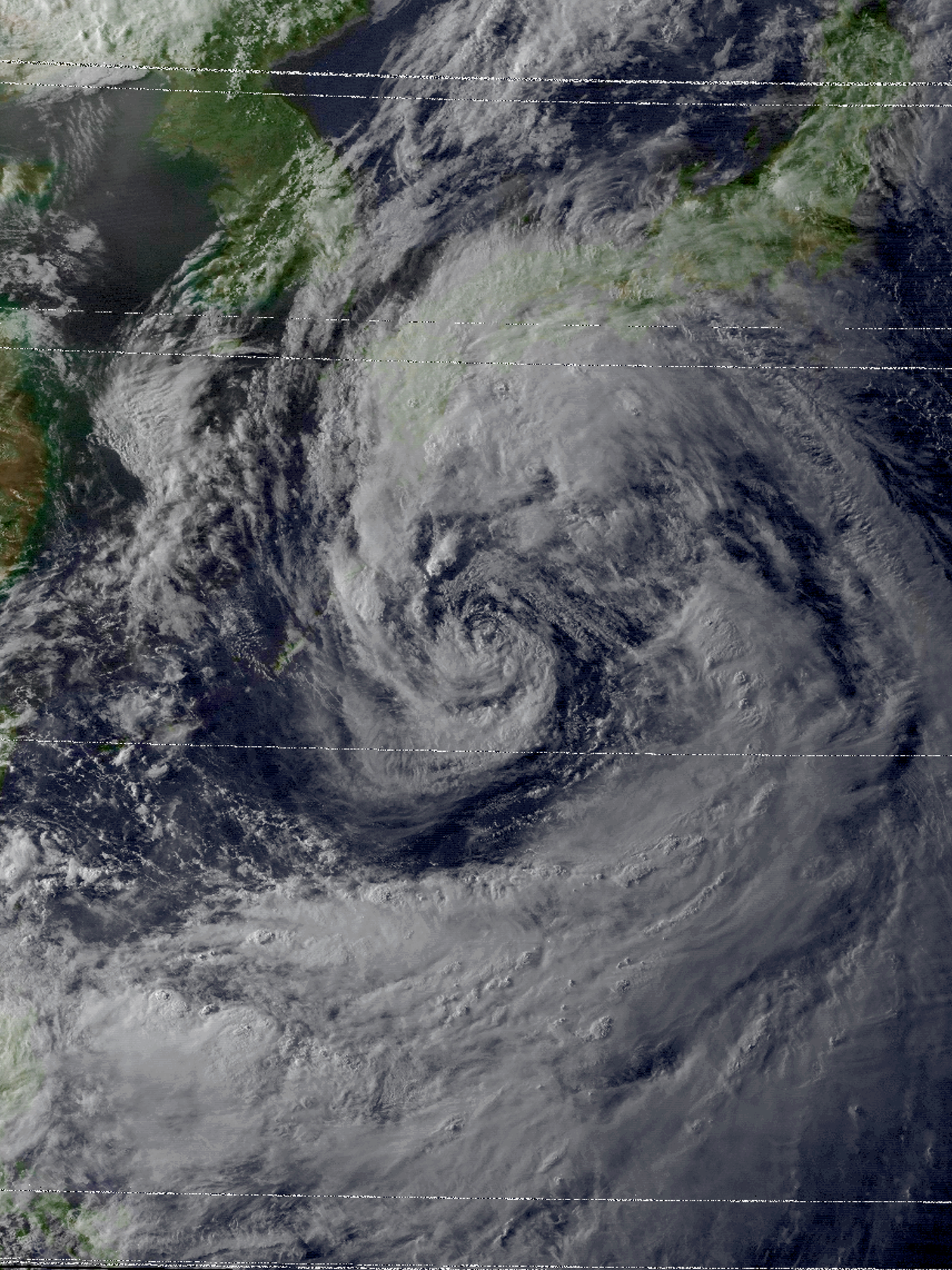
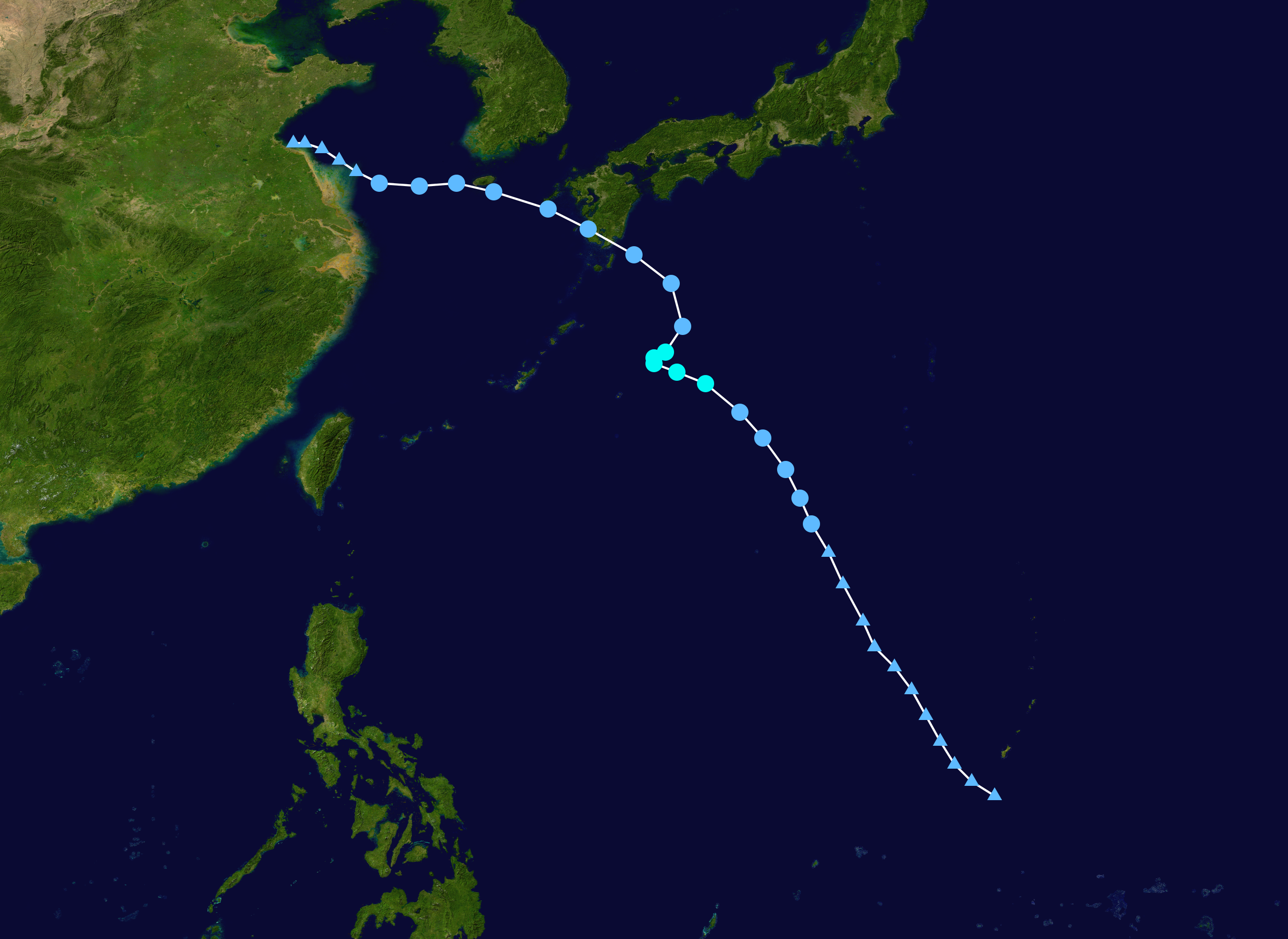
- Duration: August 3 – August 9
- Peak intensity: 85 km/h (50 mph) (10-min); 980 hPa (mbar)

Early in August, a low-level circulation center formed within a monsoon gyre to the southwest of Guam. On August 2 the JTWC issued a TCFA for the developing disturbance as it moved to the northwest, and it became Tropical Depression 12W the next day. On August 4 the depression became Tropical Storm Paul and began to merge with the gyre from which it had formed. As it began merging, Paul strengthened to its peak with 95 km/h (59 mph) winds, to the east of Okinawa. After the two systems had merged, Paul turned briefly to the northeast and weakened to back into a tropical depression. The depression moved to the west, brushing the south coast of Kyūshū on August 6 before dissipating in the Yellow Sea.

Tropical Storm Paul was highly unusual in that it formed from a monsoon gyre and then merged with it. Mergers of such systems rarely occur, it is much more common for tropical cyclones which form in this manner to move independently of the non-tropical system. Paul was also considered a tropical storm by the JMA, who reported that the rainfall from the storm caused landslides and flooding in western Japan. Agricultural damage in Oita prefecture was ¥6.36 million (US$56,000).

=== Tropical Storm Rachel ===
- Tropical storm (JMA)
- Tropical storm (SSHWS)
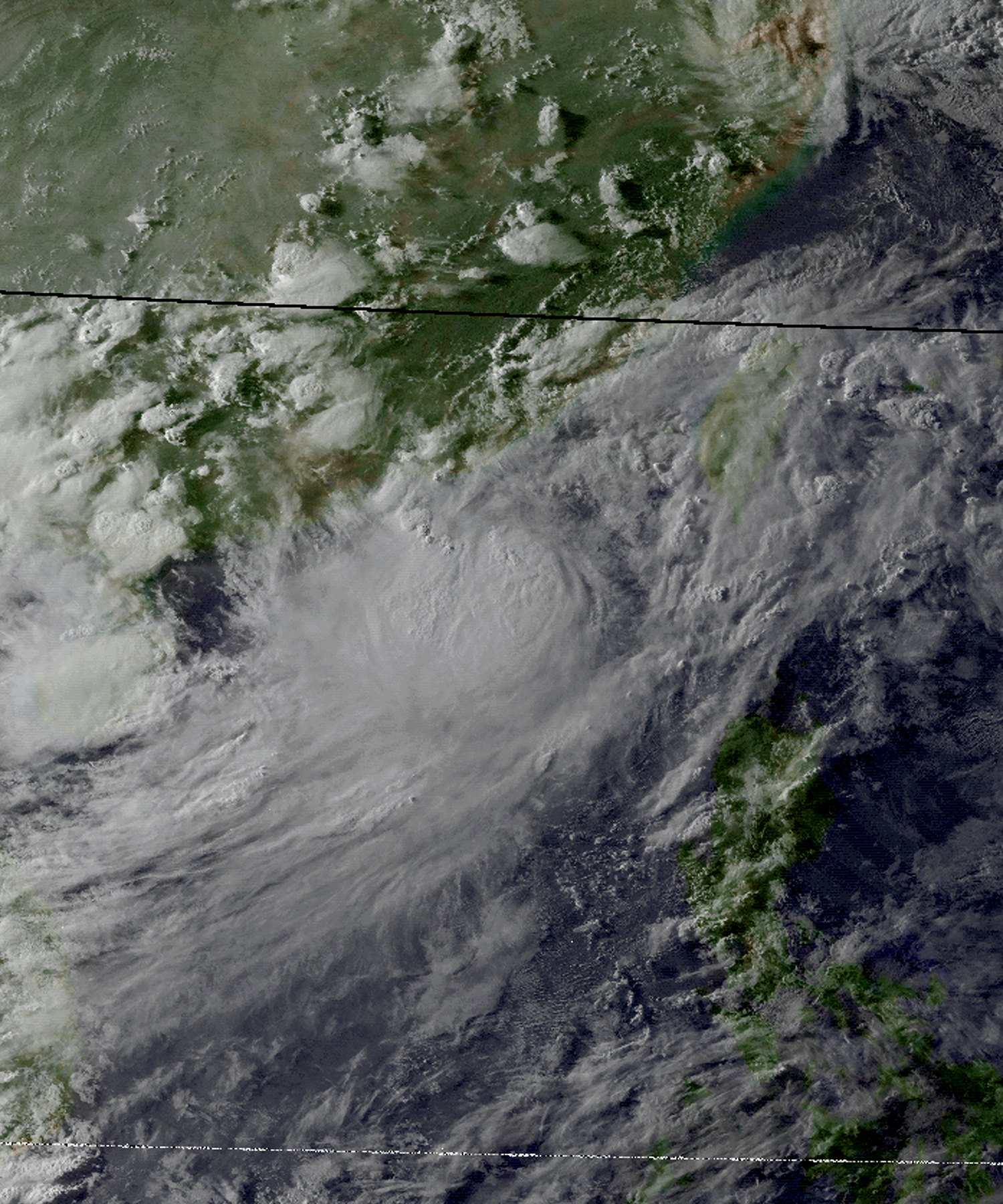
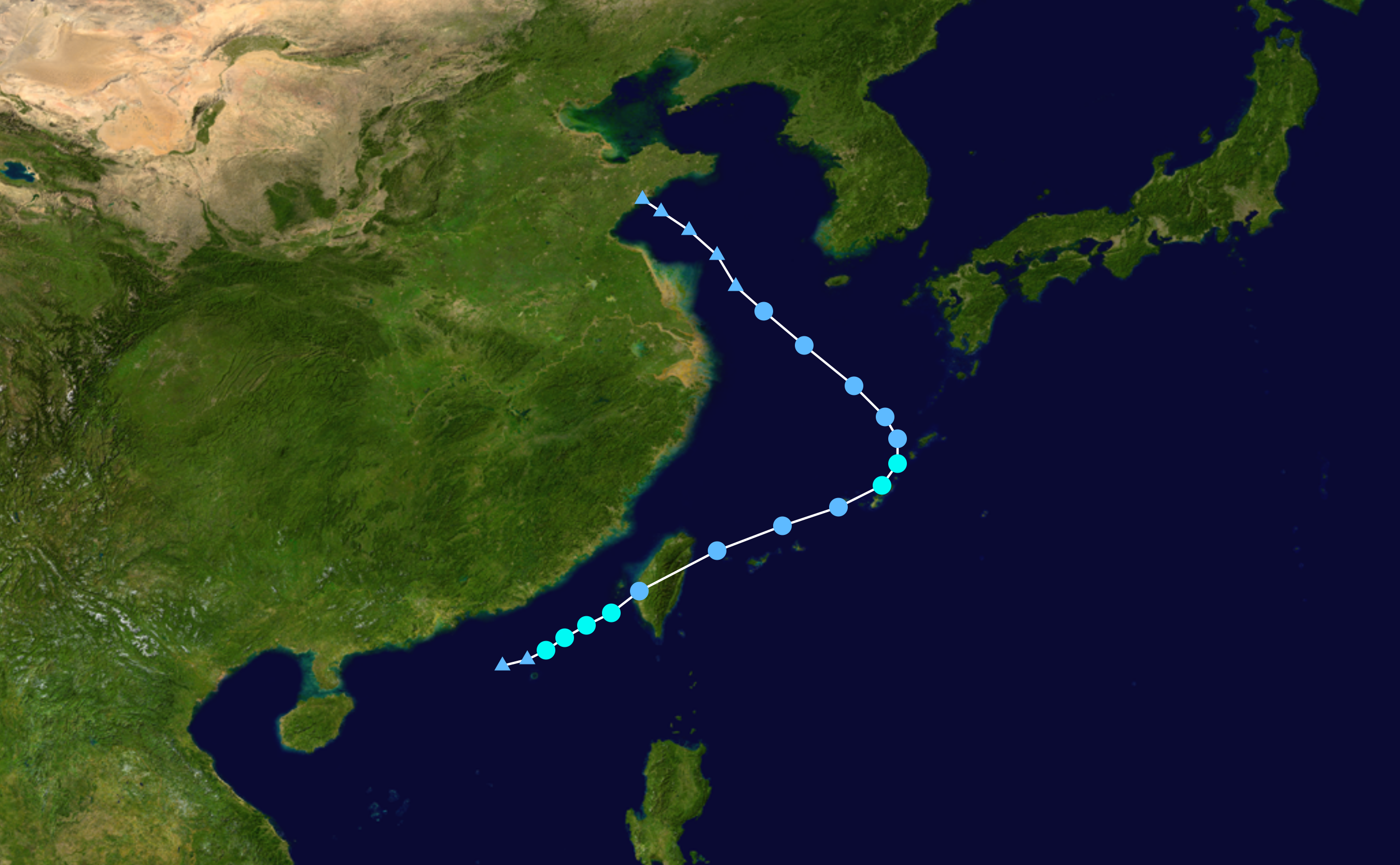
- Duration: August 5 – August 11
- Peak intensity: 65 km/h (40 mph) (10-min); 992 hPa (mbar)

A tropical disturbance formed within a monsoon trough just off the Chinese coast on August 6. The disturbance strengthened and became Tropical Storm Rachel as it moved east towards Taiwan. Rachel weakened back into a depression before it made landfall on the island and it dissipated over the Chungyang mountains on August 7. The remnants moved northeast into the East China Sea and the system redeveloped into a tropical depression the next day as it approached Okinawa. Rachel briefly became a minimal tropical storm for a second time as it approached the Japanese island, before it turned to the northwest. The storm entered an increasingly unfavorable environment and rapidly weakened on August 9.

=== Tropical Depression 14W ===
- Tropical depression (SSHWS)
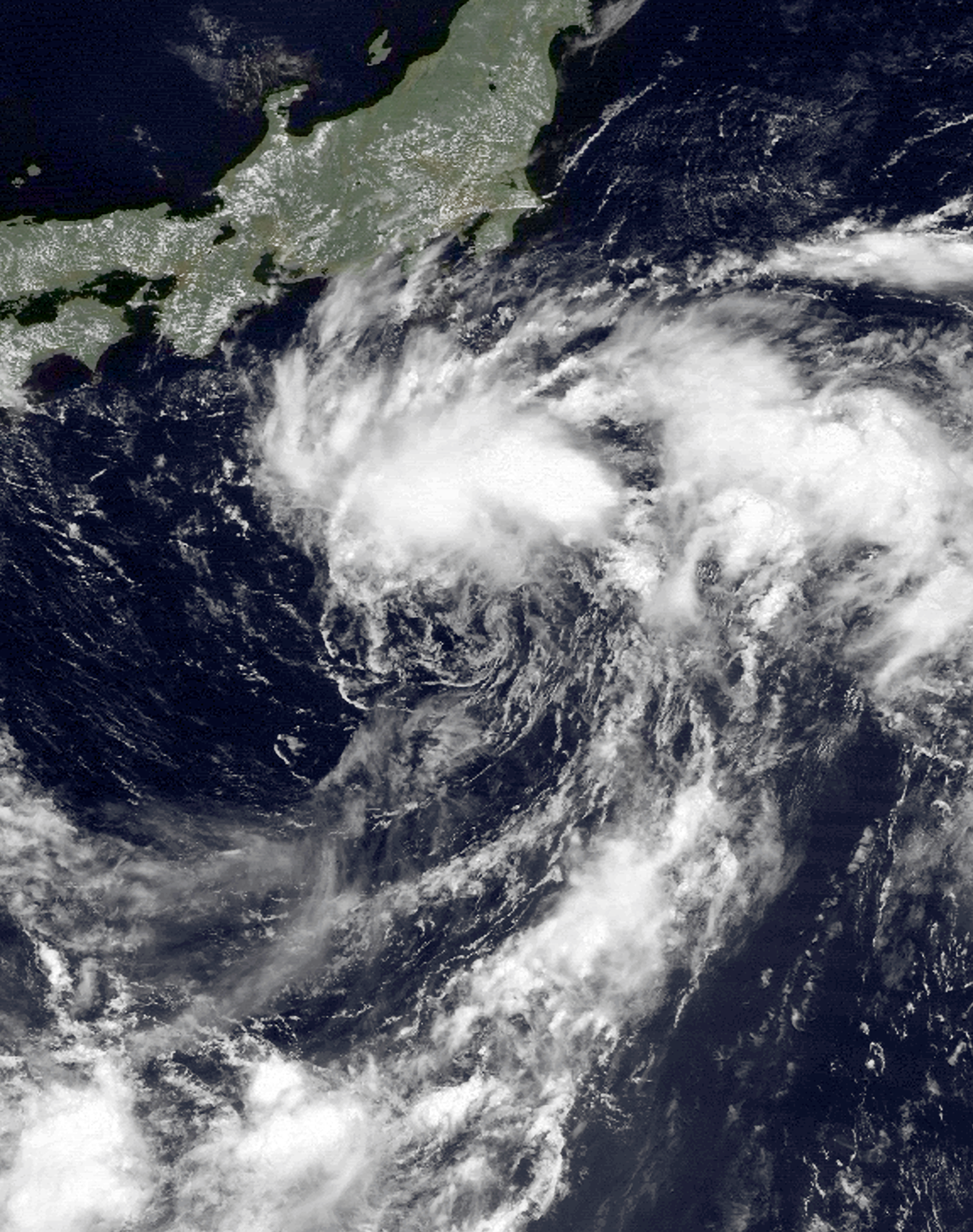
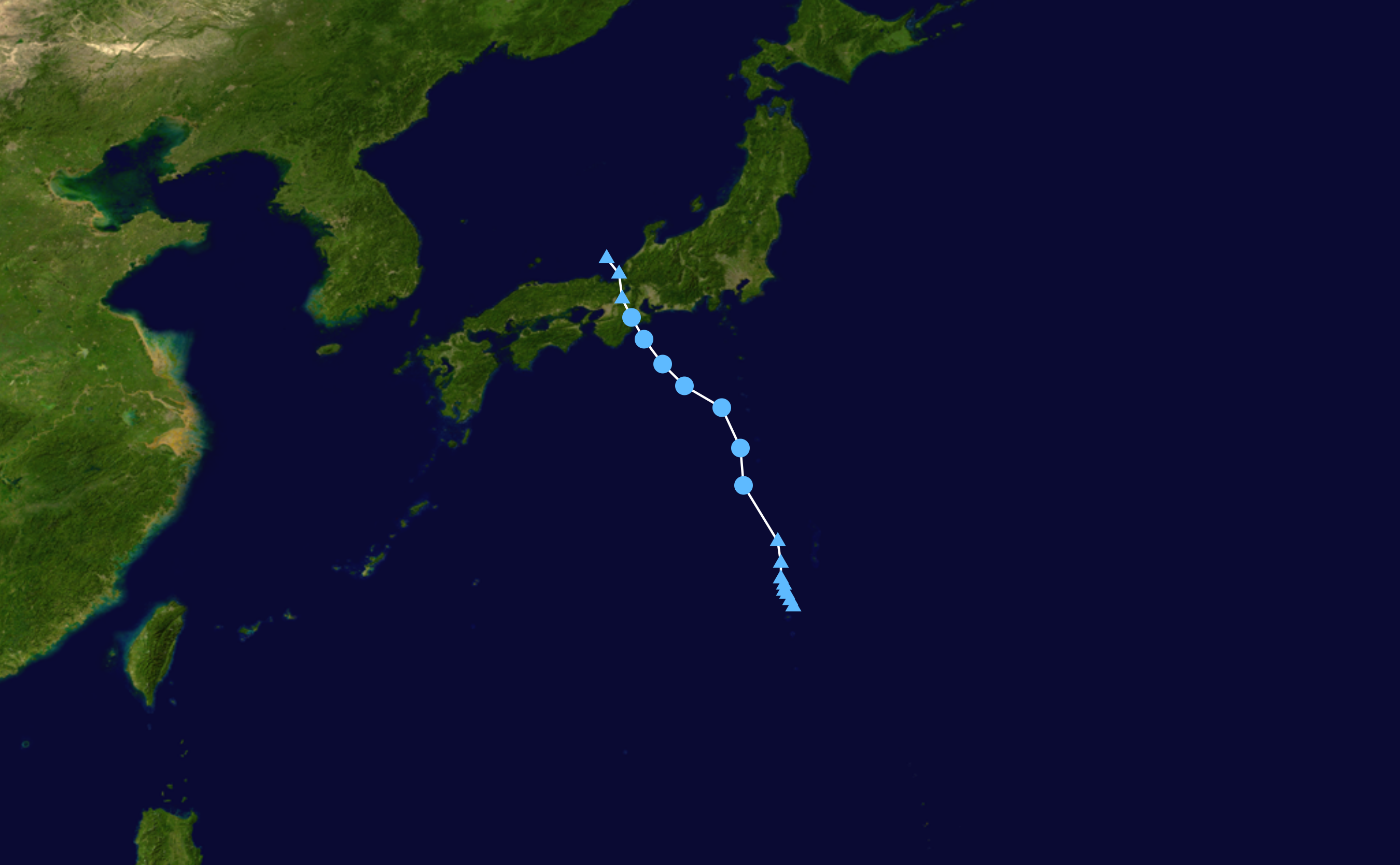
- Duration: August 8 – August 10
- Peak intensity: 45 km/h (30 mph) (1-min); 1000 hPa (mbar)

Tropical Depression 14W formed 120 km (75 mi) to the north of Iwo Jima on August 8. The depression, which had an exposed circulation center, moved to the north under the influence of a subtropical ridge over northern Japan. On August 9 it turned to the northwest and accelerated before its landfall near Owase the next day, with 45 km/h (28 mph) winds. The depression weakened as it passed north over Honshū and dissipated shortly after moving over the Sea of Japan.

=== Tropical Depression 15W ===
- Tropical depression (SSHWS)
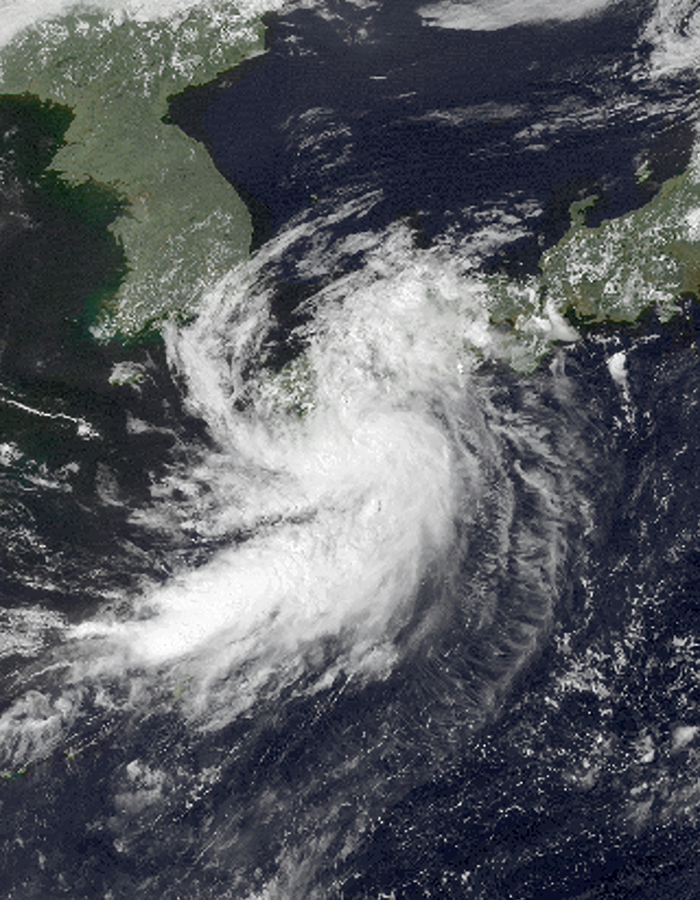
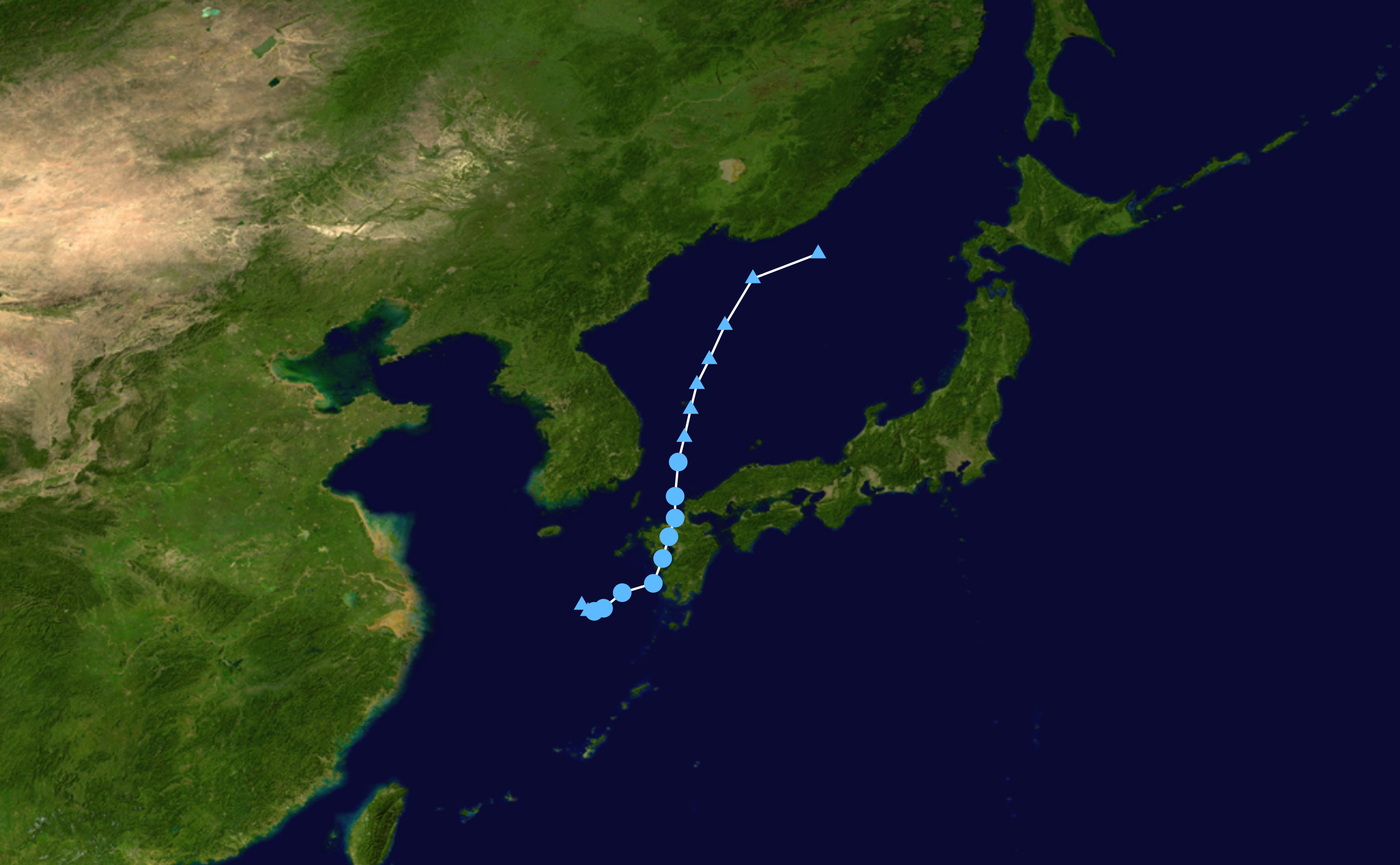
- Duration: August 16 – August 18
- Peak intensity: 45 km/h (30 mph) (1-min); 1002 hPa (mbar)

A tropical disturbance developed in the East China Sea on August 15 and gradually drifted towards Kyūshū. It intensified as it did so, becoming Tropical Depression 15W the next day. The fourth warning from the JTWC repositioned the cyclone much closer to the Kyūshū coast, where it made landfall near Ushibuka on August 17. The depression then drifted over Kyūshū and entered the Sea of Japan later that day, where it weakened. The storm became extratropical on August 18, but its remnants were recognizable for a further two days.

=== Severe Tropical Storm Sam (Luding) ===
- Severe tropical storm (JMA)
- Category 1 typhoon (SSHWS)
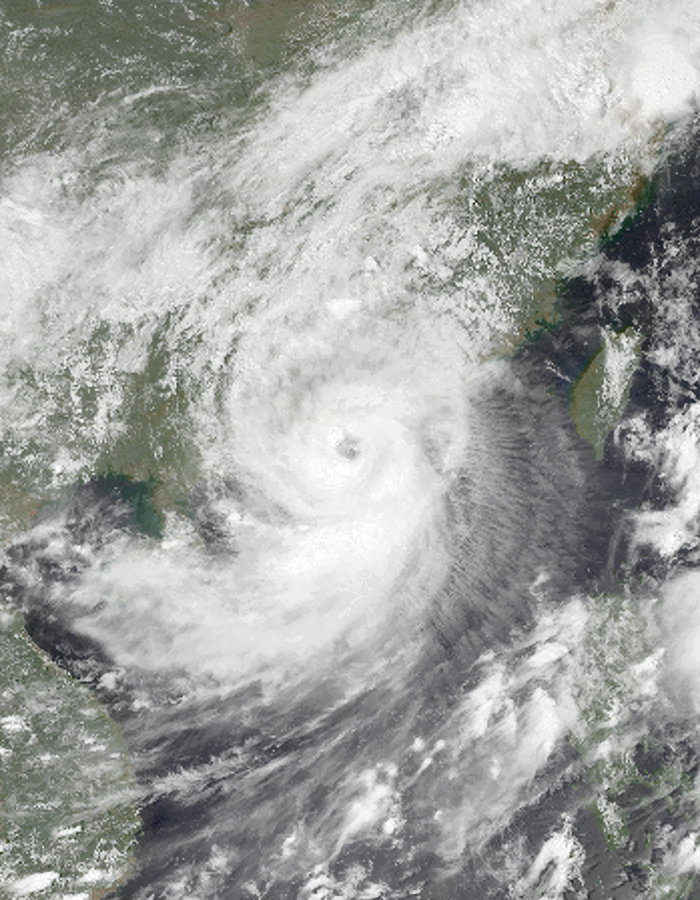
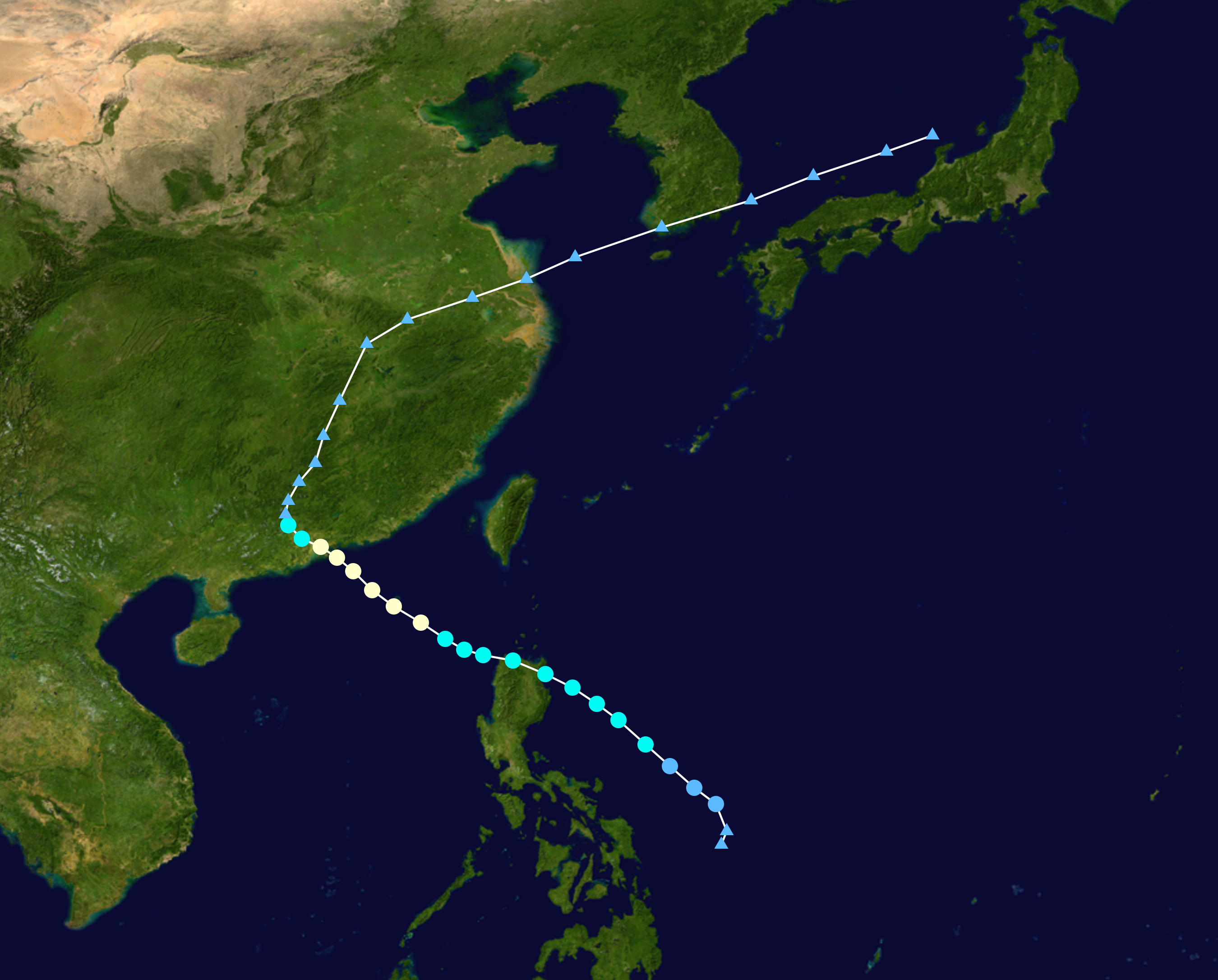
- Duration: August 17 – August 24
- Peak intensity: 100 km/h (65 mph) (10-min); 980 hPa (mbar)

On August 17, an area of circulation within the monsoon trough located in the Philippine Sea became more organized and the JTWC issued a TCFA. The developing cyclone slowly moved to the northwest, becoming Tropical Depression 16W nine hours after the TCFA was first issued. As the cyclone continued to intensify, it became Tropical Storm Sam on August 19. Around this time, the subtropical ridge to Sam's north shifted its track in a westwards direction towards Luzon. The storm passed over the north of the island on August 20 and entered the South China Sea reaching typhoon strength the next day. Sam gradually intensified further as it approached the Chinese coast and it made landfall about 19 km (12 mi) to the northeast of Hong Kong at its peak with 140 km/h (87 mph) winds on August 22. Sam continued to move to the northwest over China dissipating about 24 hours later. PAGASA named the developing storm Luding shortly before the JTWC began to issue advisories.

Typhoon Sam was responsible for seven deaths in the Philippines. In addition, flooding from its rainfall displaced over 4000 people, and many major roads were closed due to landslides near Baguio. Sam became the wettest tropical cyclone to affect Hong Kong since records began in 1884, dropping over 616 mm (24.3 in) of rain, exceeding the previous record set in 1926. Peak sustained winds of 96 km/h (60 mph) were recorded on Waglan Island as the typhoon passed over the territory. The heavy rain led to many instances of flooding and over 150 landslides throughout Hong Kong, killing 1 person and forcing the evacuation of about 1,000. A total of 328 people were injured in various incidents relating to the storm, and total losses in Hong Kong totaled to approximately $17 million. In addition to the direct casualties from the storm, China Airlines Flight 642, using an MD-11 aircraft, crashed while attempting to land at Hong Kong International Airport, killing three on board and injuring 219. At the time of the crash wind gusts in excess of 65 km/h (40 mph) were recorded at the airport. After moving into China, Sam killed at least 17 and injured 100 people in Guangdong. Direct economic losses in the province were about $18 million.

=== Severe Tropical Storm Tanya ===
- Severe tropical storm (JMA)
- Category 1 typhoon (SSHWS)
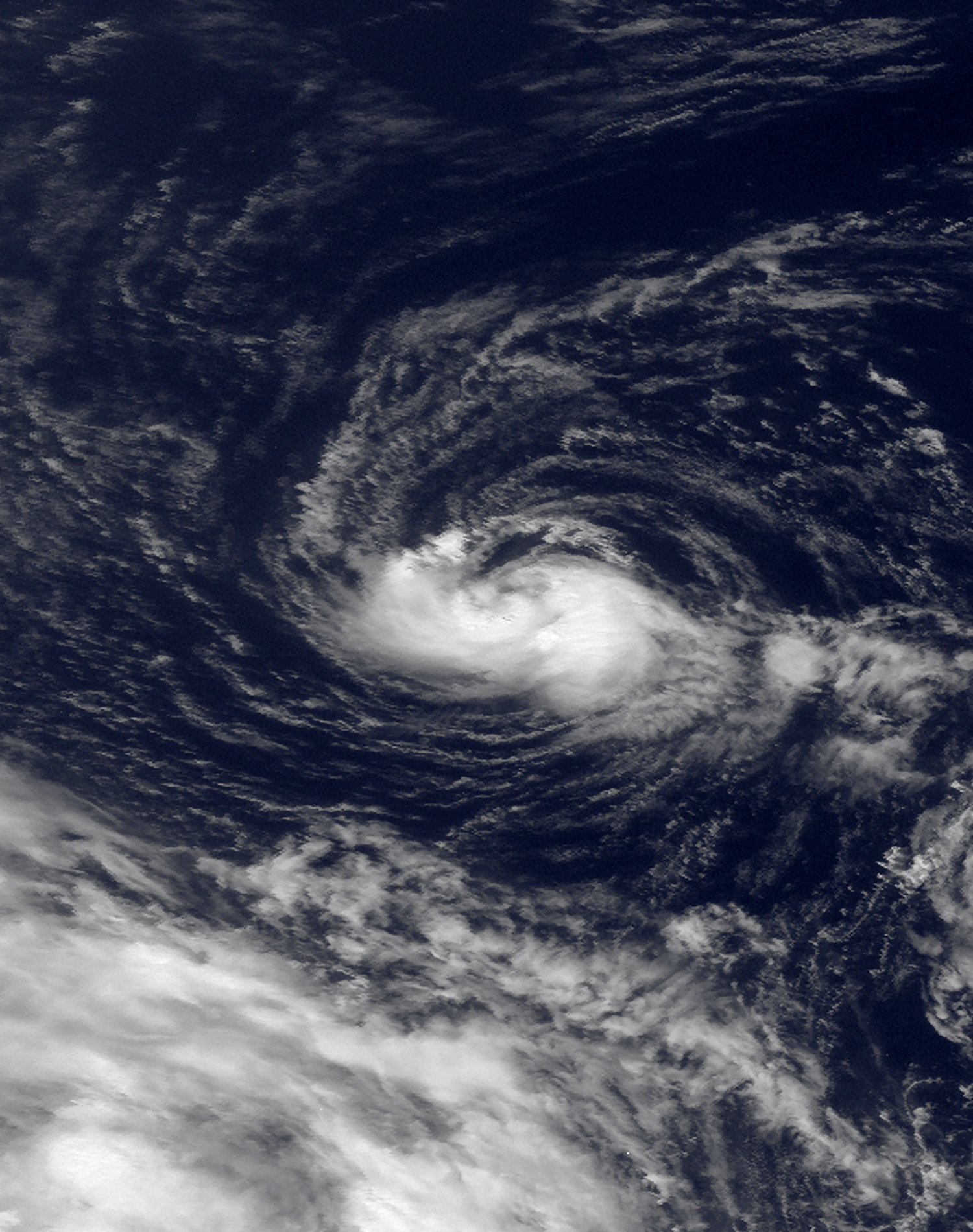
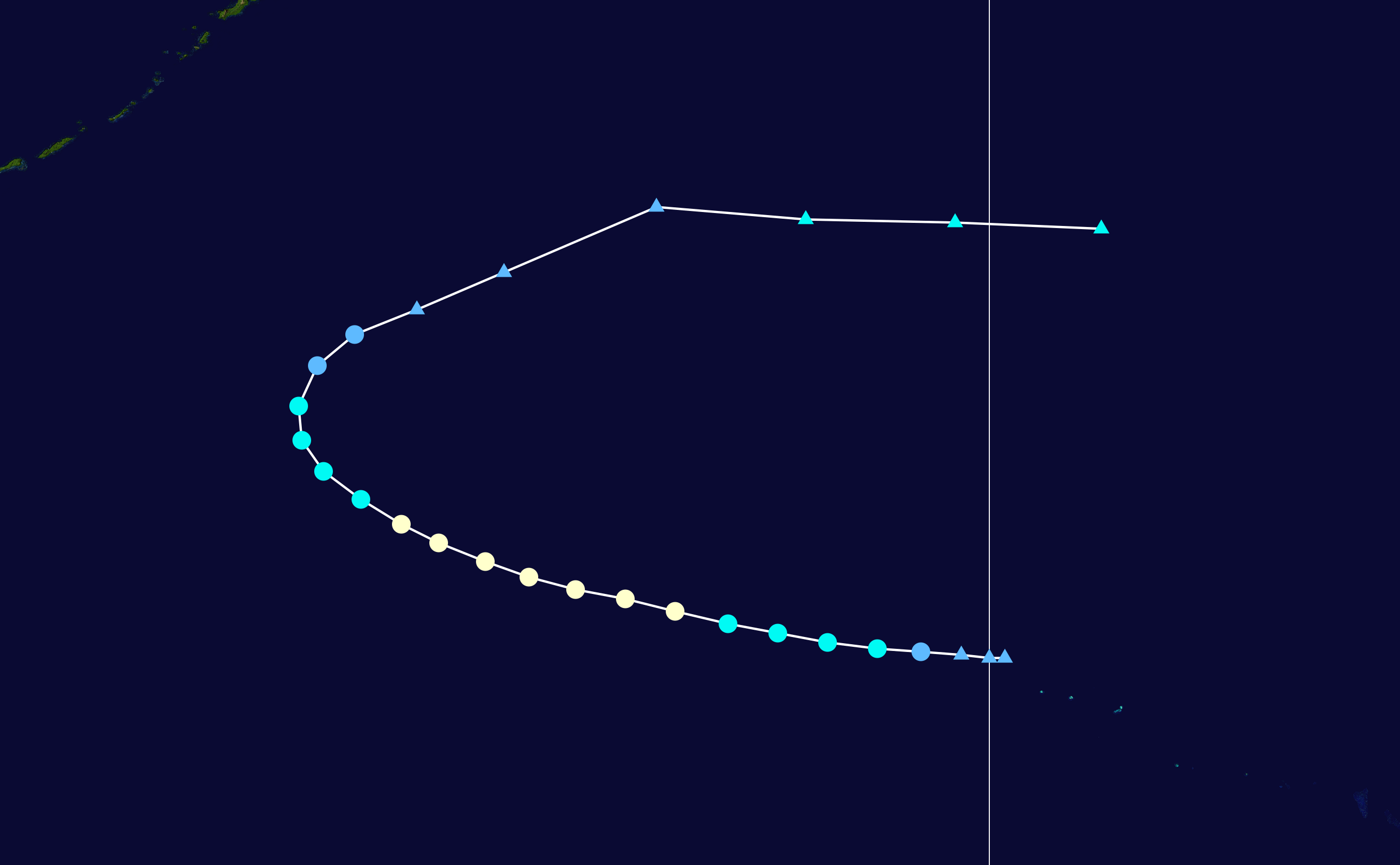
- Duration: August 19 – August 24
- Peak intensity: 95 km/h (60 mph) (10-min); 1000 hPa (mbar)

On August 19, Tropical Depression 17-W formed at a usually high latitude of over 30°N from a westwards moving low pressure area. The compact system intensified as it moved west under the influence of the subtropical ridge to the north, with the JTWC upgrading it to Tropical Storm Tanya early the next day. Tanya continued to slowly intensify, reaching its peak as a 130 km/h (81 mph) typhoon on August 22. The next day Tanya began to recurve through a weakness in the ridge to its north and increasing wind shear weakened the storm. The storm weakened further as it began to transition into an extratropical storm and the JTWC issued the final warning on the cyclone on August 24.

The JMA also monitored Tanya and made it a severe tropical storm at its peak. Post-season analysis increased the initial intensity of the system, making it a tropical storm before the JTWC began to issue full advisories on Tanya. Typhoon Tanya had no effects on land.

=== Severe Tropical Storm Dora ===
- Severe tropical storm (JMA)
- Tropical storm (SSHWS)
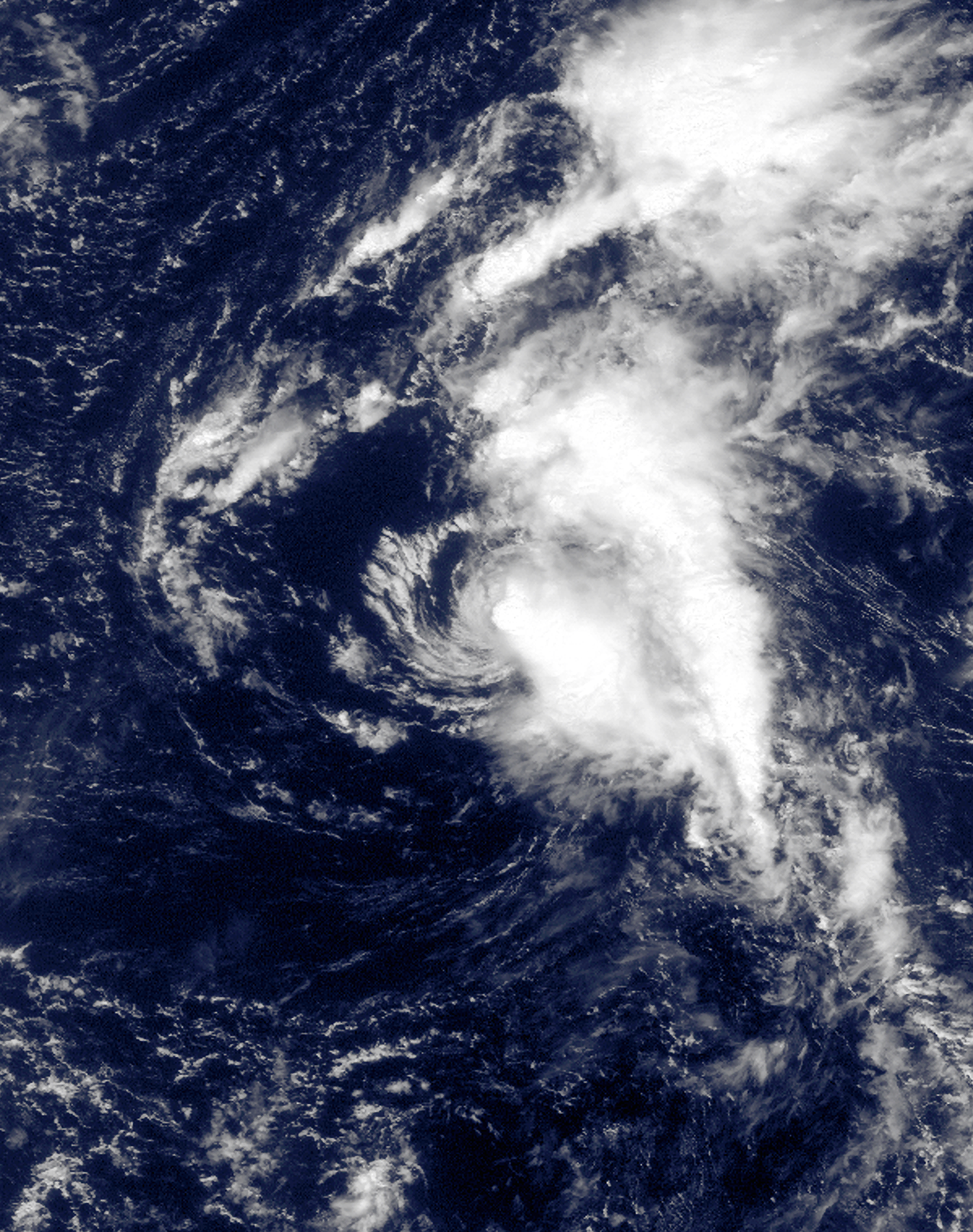
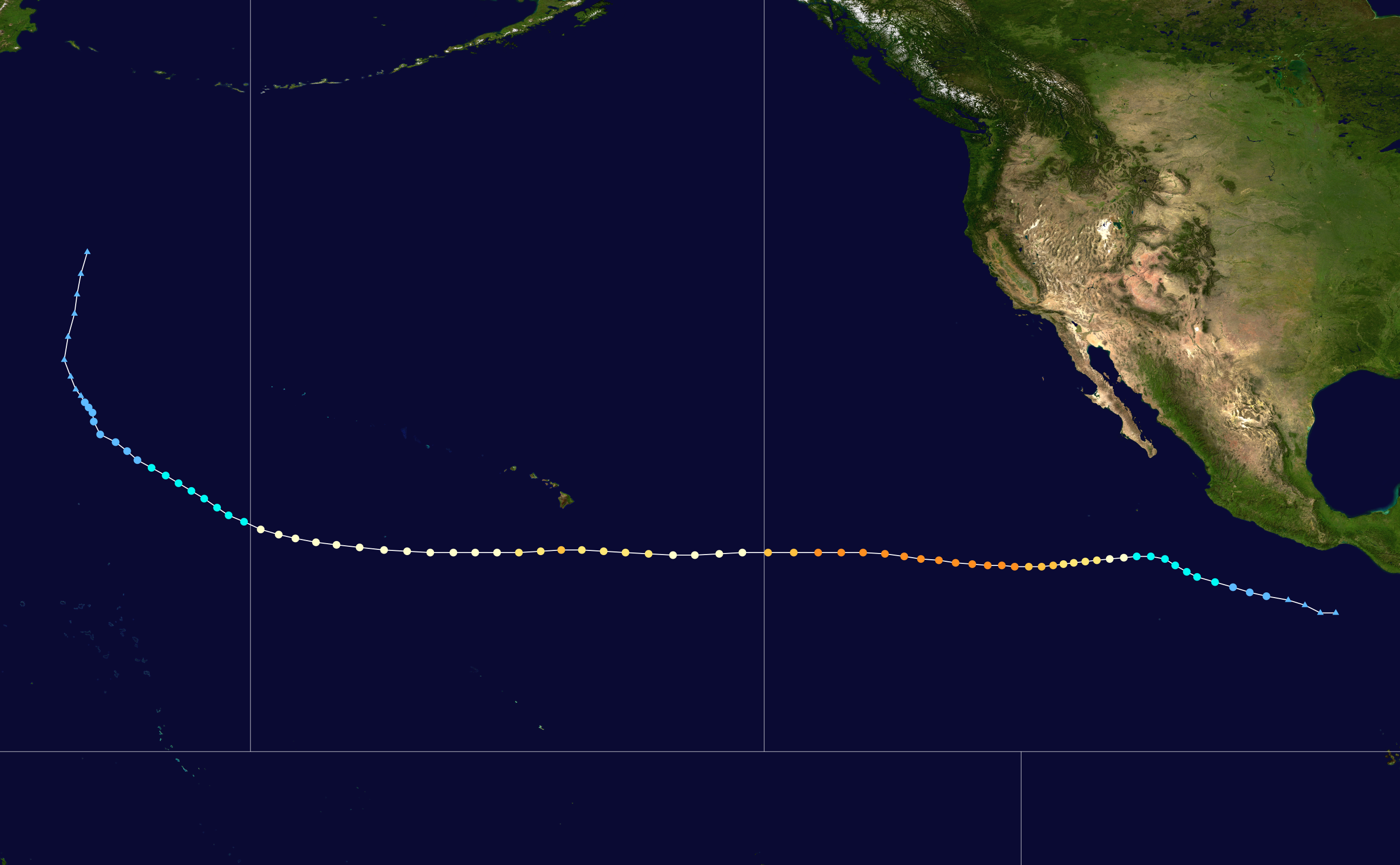
- Duration: August 20 (Entered basin) – August 23
- Peak intensity: 95 km/h (60 mph) (10-min); 990 hPa (mbar)

Hurricane Dora, the strongest storm of the 1999 Pacific hurricane season, crossed the International Date Line and entered the western Pacific on August 19. The final advisory from the Central Pacific Hurricane Center was written while Dora was still in the eastern Pacific as a minimal hurricane. As the storm crossed the Date Line, the JTWC assumed responsibility for the storm and downgraded it to a tropical storm on its first advisory. Once in the West Pacific, Tropical Storm Dora turned towards the northwest and weakened further as wind shear increased. Dora weakened to a tropical depression on August 22 well to the north of Wake Island and drifted to the north before dissipating the next day.

Dora became the first storm since 1994's John to have existed in all three Pacific basins, and no significant damage was caused by the system anywhere along its path.

=== Tropical Depression 18W ===
- Tropical depression (SSHWS)
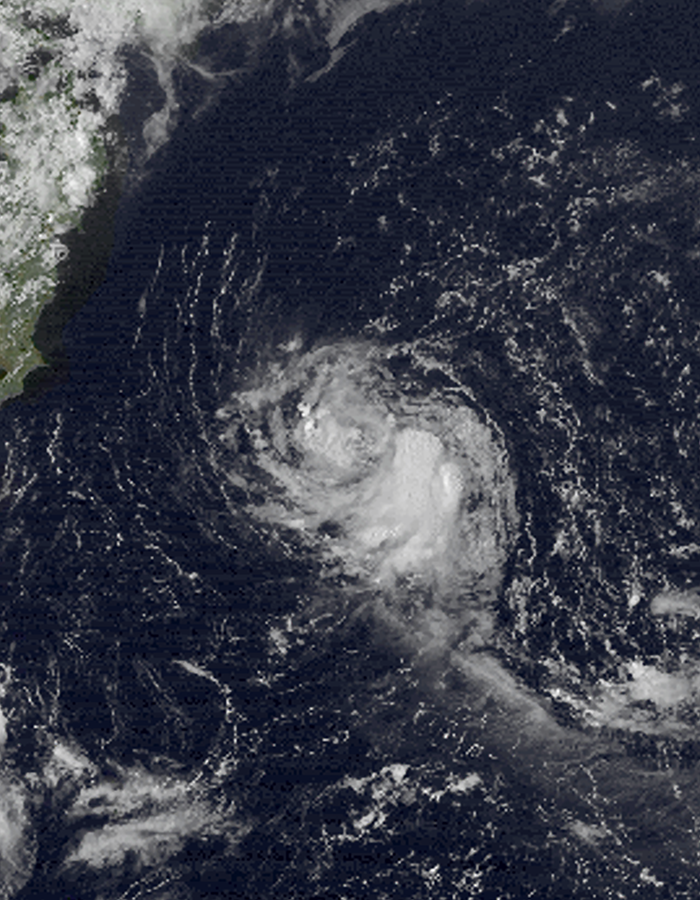
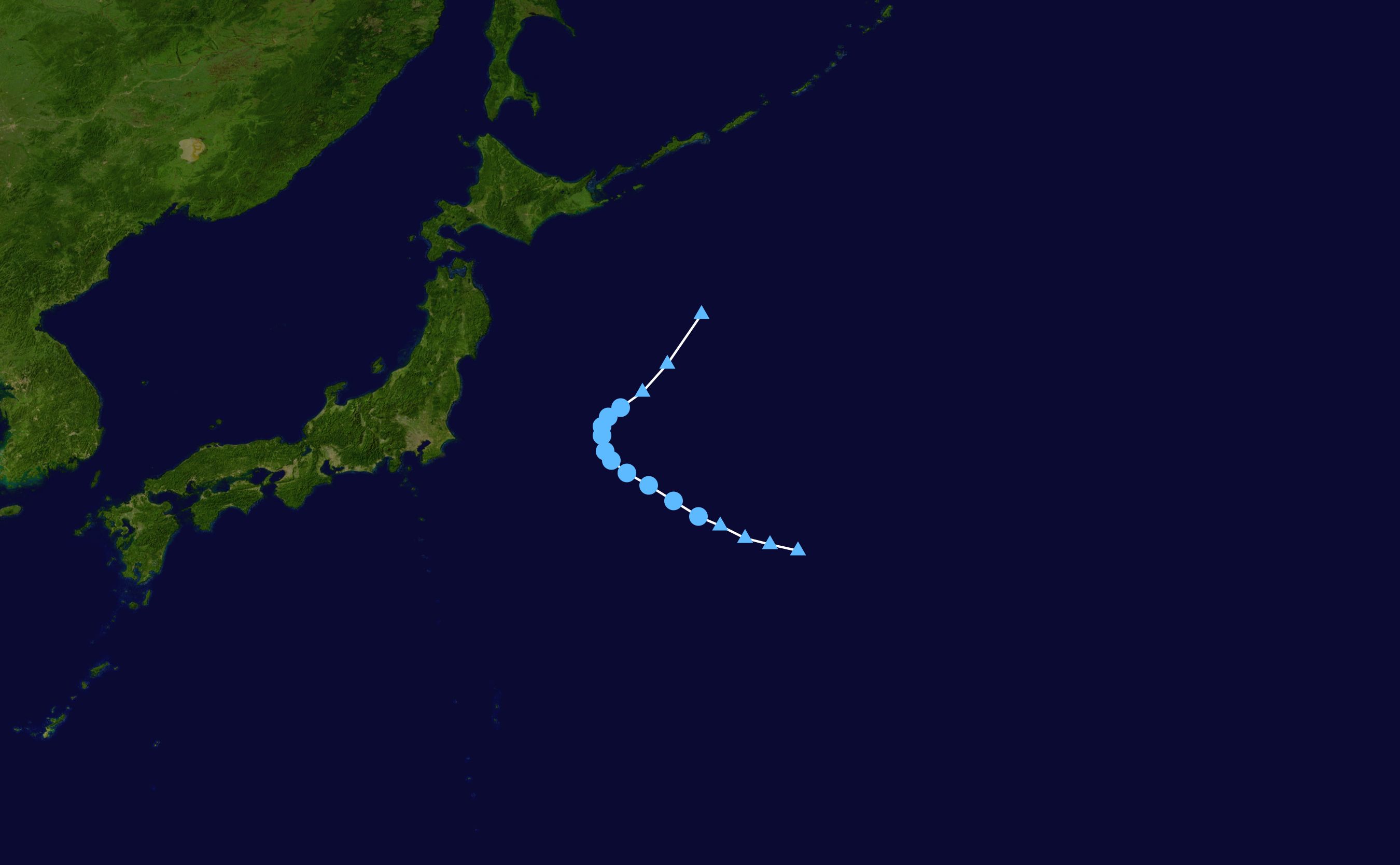
- Duration: August 21 – August 24
- Peak intensity: 55 km/h (35 mph) (1-min); 1000 hPa (mbar)

On August 21, a small tropical cyclone developed at the southern end of a westward moving shearline about 1,200 km (750 mi) to the east of Tokyo. The depression strengthened slightly to its peak with 55 km/h (34 mph) the next day, before increasing vertical shear took its toll on the system. The increasingly exposed low level circulation of the storm accelerated to the north, towards the frontal system from which it had formed. Finally, Tropical Depression 18W became extratropical on August 24 to the east of Japan.

=== Severe Tropical Storm Virgil ===
- Severe tropical storm (JMA)
- Category 1 typhoon (SSHWS)
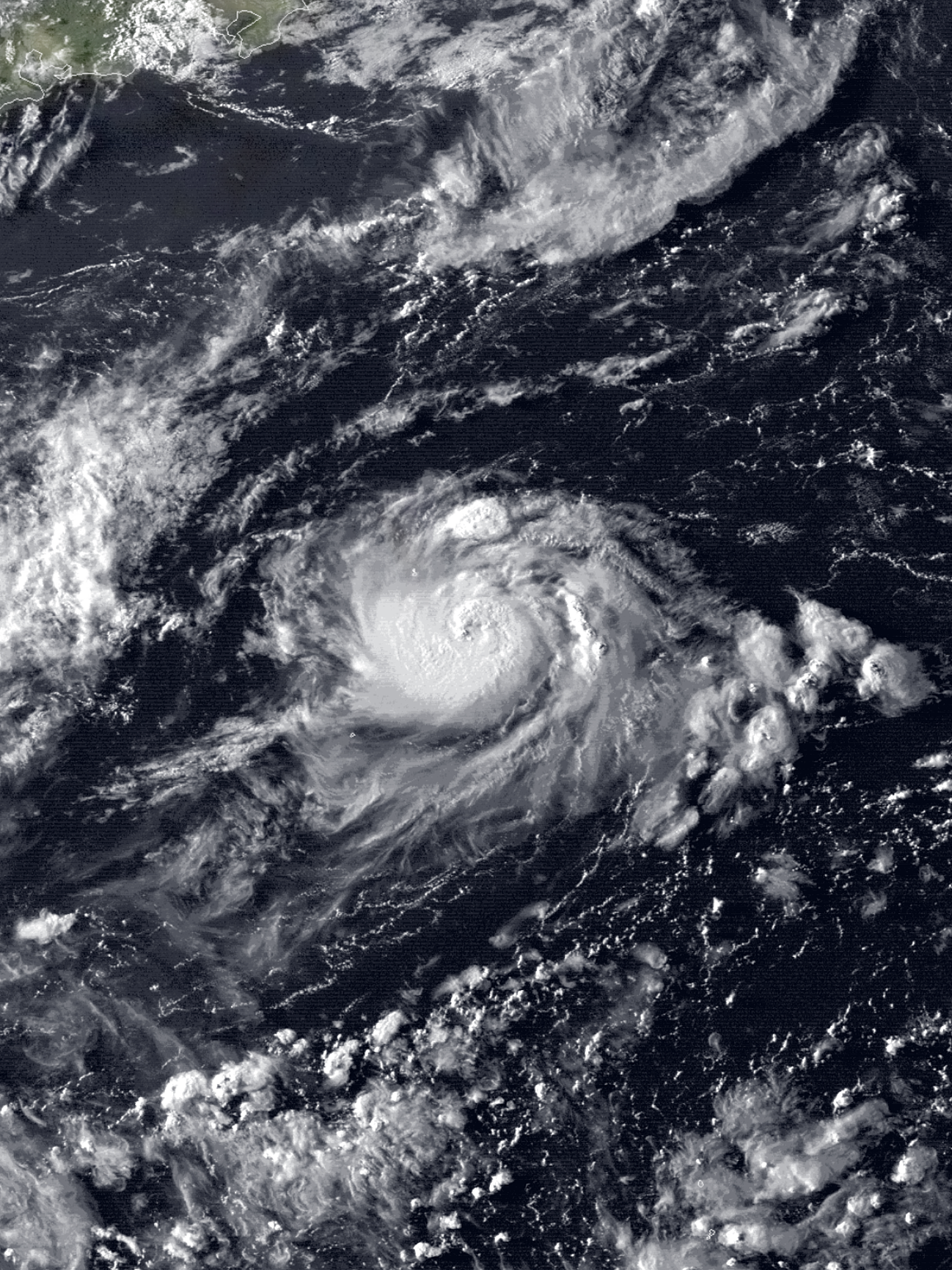
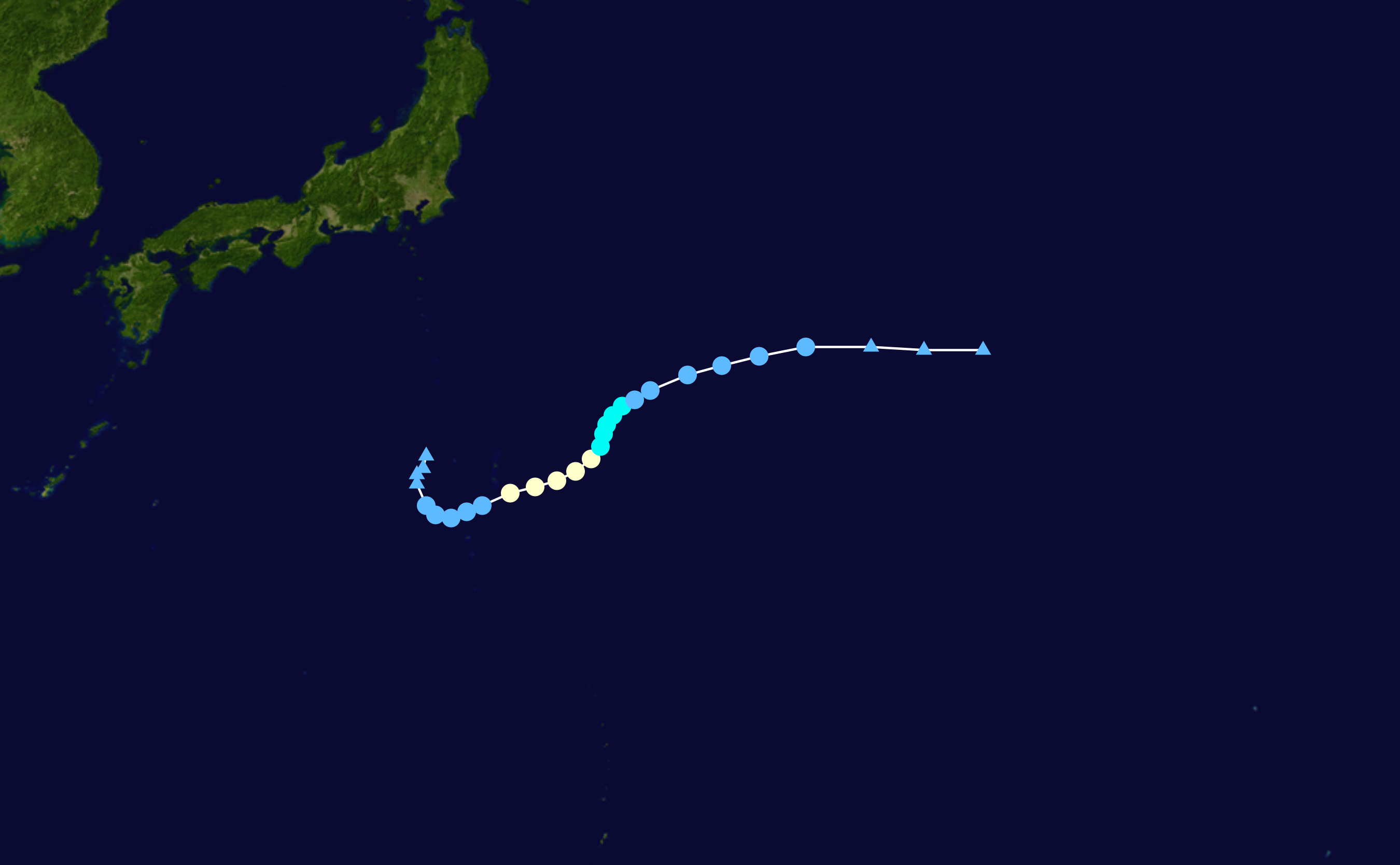
- Duration: August 23 – August 29
- Peak intensity: 95 km/h (60 mph) (10-min); 994 hPa (mbar)

A tropical disturbance developed at the end of a shear line to the north of Iwo Jima on August 23. Vertical shear began to weaken and the JTWC began to issue advisories on Tropical Depression 19W the next day. The storm turned to the southwest and rapidly intensified on August 25, strengthening from a tropical depression to its peak as a 130 km/h (81 mph) typhoon in 12 hours. Virgil maintained typhoon strength for over a day before it entered a highly sheared environment in which it began to weaken again. Under the influence of a passing frontal system, the motion of the dissipating cyclone turned clockwise to the northeast. The storm dissipated on August 29 over water having never approached land. The JMA monitored Typhoon Virgil and made it a minimal severe tropical storm at its peak.

=== Tropical Storm Wendy (Mameng) ===
- Tropical storm (JMA)
- Tropical storm (SSHWS)
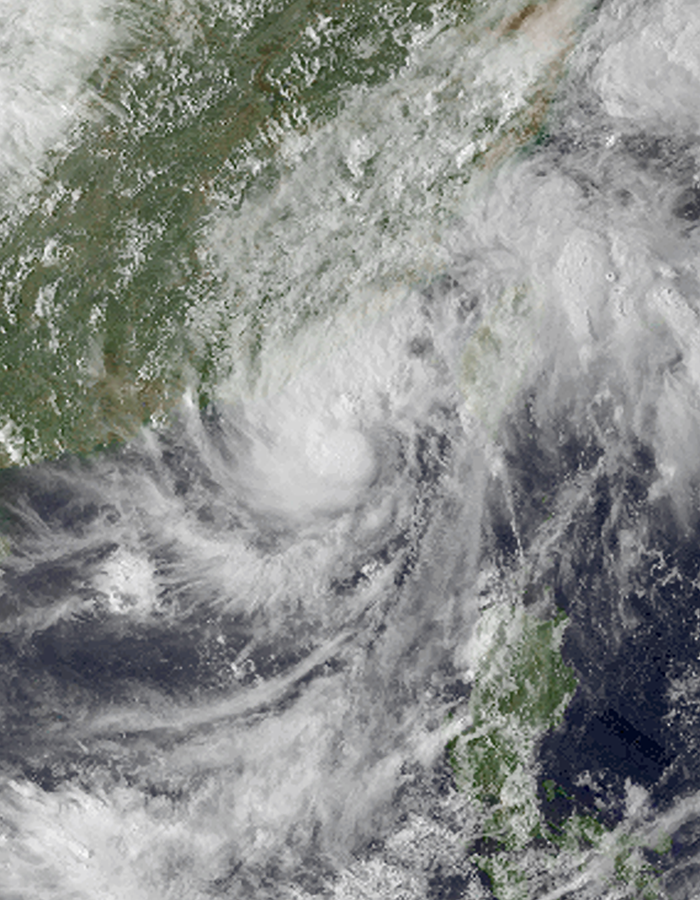
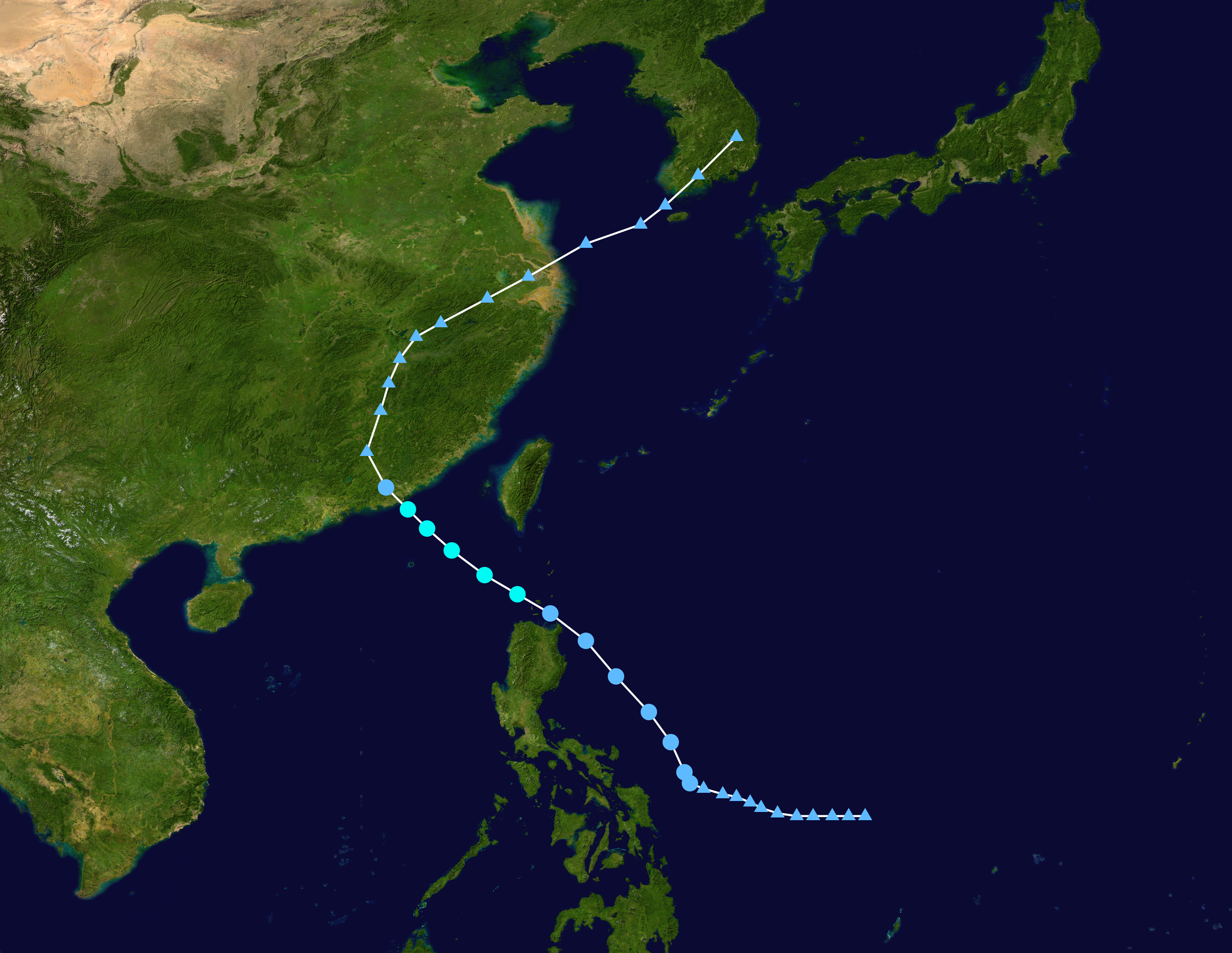
- Duration: September 1 – September 4
- Peak intensity: 65 km/h (40 mph) (10-min); 996 hPa (mbar)

Late in August, a broad area of convection developed over a low pressure area in the Philippine Sea to the east of Luzon. The JTWC issued a TCFA for the developing system on August 31, and the disturbance developed into Tropical Depression 20W on September 1 as it moved to the west. The depression did not intensify as it moved to the northwest, brushing the northeast tip of Luzon on September 2. After entering the South China Sea, the system turned more to the west and reached its peak as a 75 km/h (47 mph) tropical storm. It maintained this intensity until it made landfall in China 220 km (140 mi) east-northeast of Hong Kong on September 3. The storm moved inland and dissipated soon after. Both the JMA and PAGASA monitored Tropical Storm Wendy, with PAGASA naming this storm Mameng. PAGASA considered Wendy to have stronger winds than the JTWC, despite the fact that PAGASA uses a 10-minute averaging period to measure sustained winds, which generally results in a lower speed.

Tropical Storm Wendy fueled severe rain over much of southern China in the week after it made landfall, with amounts as high as 500 mm (20 in) recorded in northern Jiangxi and southern Zhejiang. At least 118 people were killed and over 2,600 people were injured; the province of Wenzhou was significantly impacted by Wendy's effects. Over 500,000 people had to be evacuated, over 2.2 million people had been affected by the storm and a local government spokesman called it "the most serious storm in a century". The direct economic damage in the region exceeded $275 million (1999 USD). Whilst mainland China was severely affected by Wendy, the storm only had a minimal impact in Hong Kong.

=== Severe Tropical Storm York (Neneng) ===
- Severe tropical storm (JMA)
- Category 1 typhoon (SSHWS)
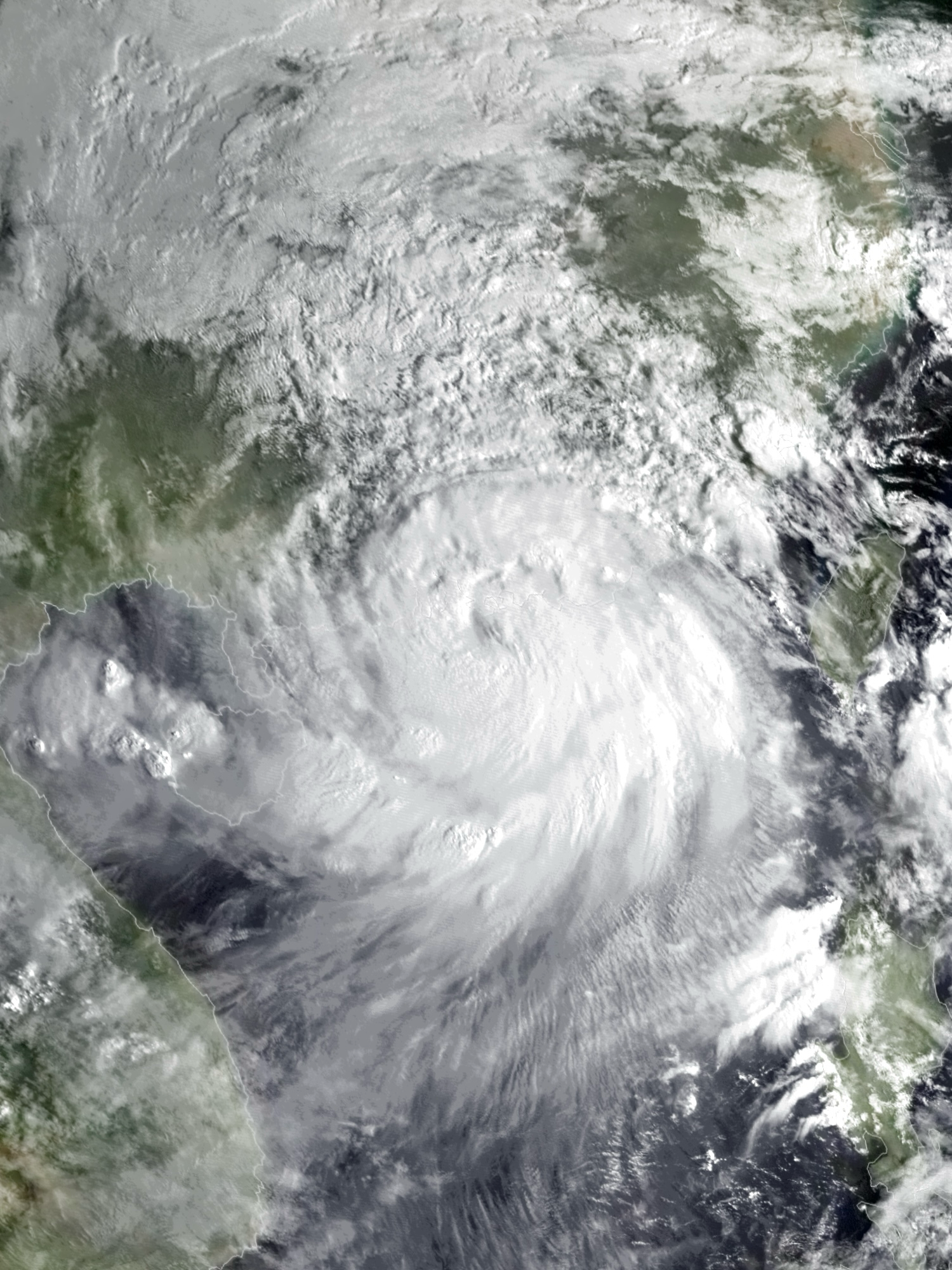
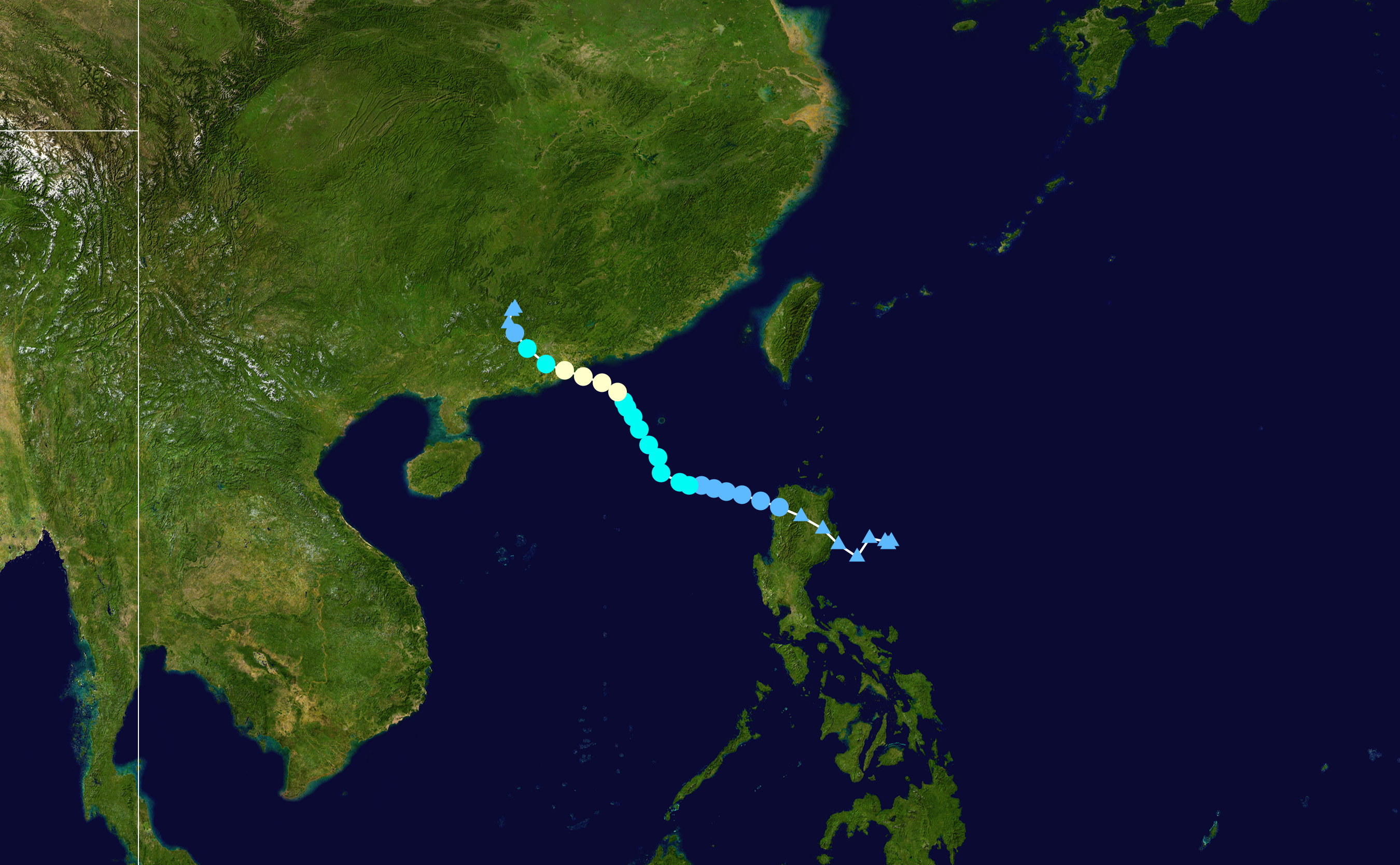
- Duration: September 10 – September 17
- Peak intensity: 100 km/h (65 mph) (10-min); 980 hPa (mbar)

A tropical disturbance developed on September 10, in the western Philippine Sea but initially failed to develop as it interacted with Luzon. The disturbance passed over Luzon and entered the South China Sea, where it became more organized and developed into Tropical Depression 21W late on September 11. The system gradually strengthened as it moved northwest towards the Chinese coastline, reaching its peak as a 130 km/h (81 mph) typhoon as it turned towards Hong Kong on September 16. York made landfall to the west of Hong Kong soon after and dissipated into a low pressure area over China the next day. Both the JMA and PAGASA monitored York as a tropical storm, with PAGASA naming the system Neneng.

As the developing depression was crossing the Philippines, it brought heavy showers of up to 400 mm (16 in), which caused some flooding in the Cagayan Valley Eighteen people were killed in landslides in northern Luzon. As Typhoon York approached and landed on Hong Kong's Lantau Island, the Hong Kong Observatory (HKO) raised the No. 10 warning for the first time since 1983 and maintained it for 11 hours, the longest hoisting period on record. The peak sustained winds of 150 km/h (93 mph) were recorded on Waglan Island and the peak gusts of 234 km/h (145 mph) were the highest on record there. A total of 300 mm (12 in) of rain fell on the territory as York passed directly over it and the resulting floods had a severe effect on agriculture throughout Hong Kong. Two people died in the storm and over 500 were injured, 11 seriously. Some 18,000 homes lost power in the wake of the storm and 4,000 trees were uprooted. Damage from York in Hong Kong exceeded $10 million (USD), and economic losses from the storm reached several billion Hong Kong dollars (HKD). Transport in the territory was severely disrupted, with 470 flights cancelled and 80,000 passengers affected.

Two ships ran aground and a cargo ship sank, but all the crew were successfully rescued. One person was injured in Macau and 120 incidents related to the storm were reported there. After passing over Hong Kong, York killed 15 and injured 700 in Guangdong, with economic losses there exceeding $24 million (USD). Ten thousand people were left stranded by flooding in China after the storm and more than 10,000 trees were uprooted in Shenzhen.

=== Tropical Storm Zia ===
- Tropical storm (JMA)
- Tropical storm (SSHWS)
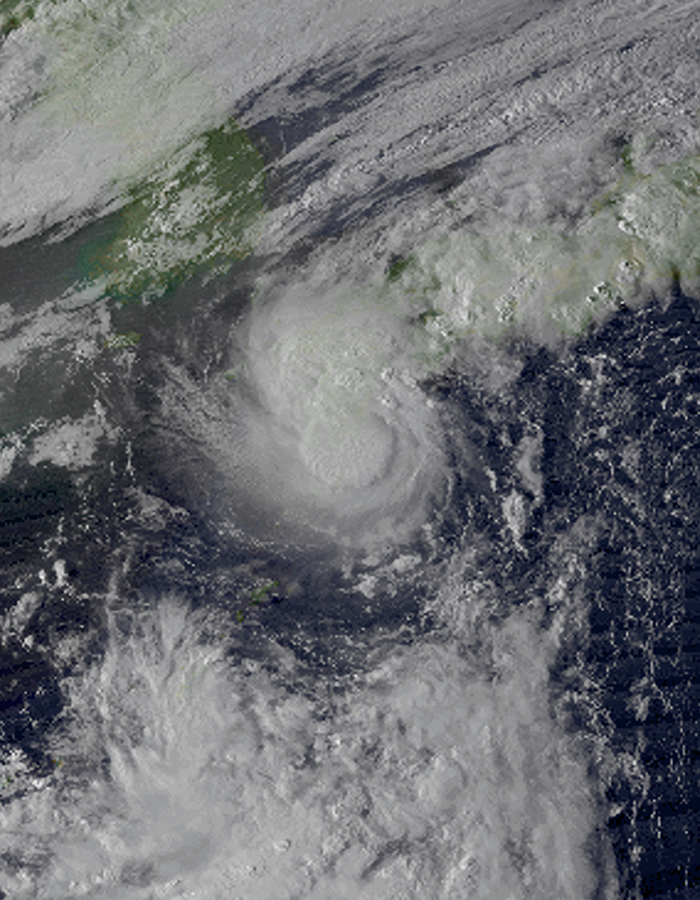
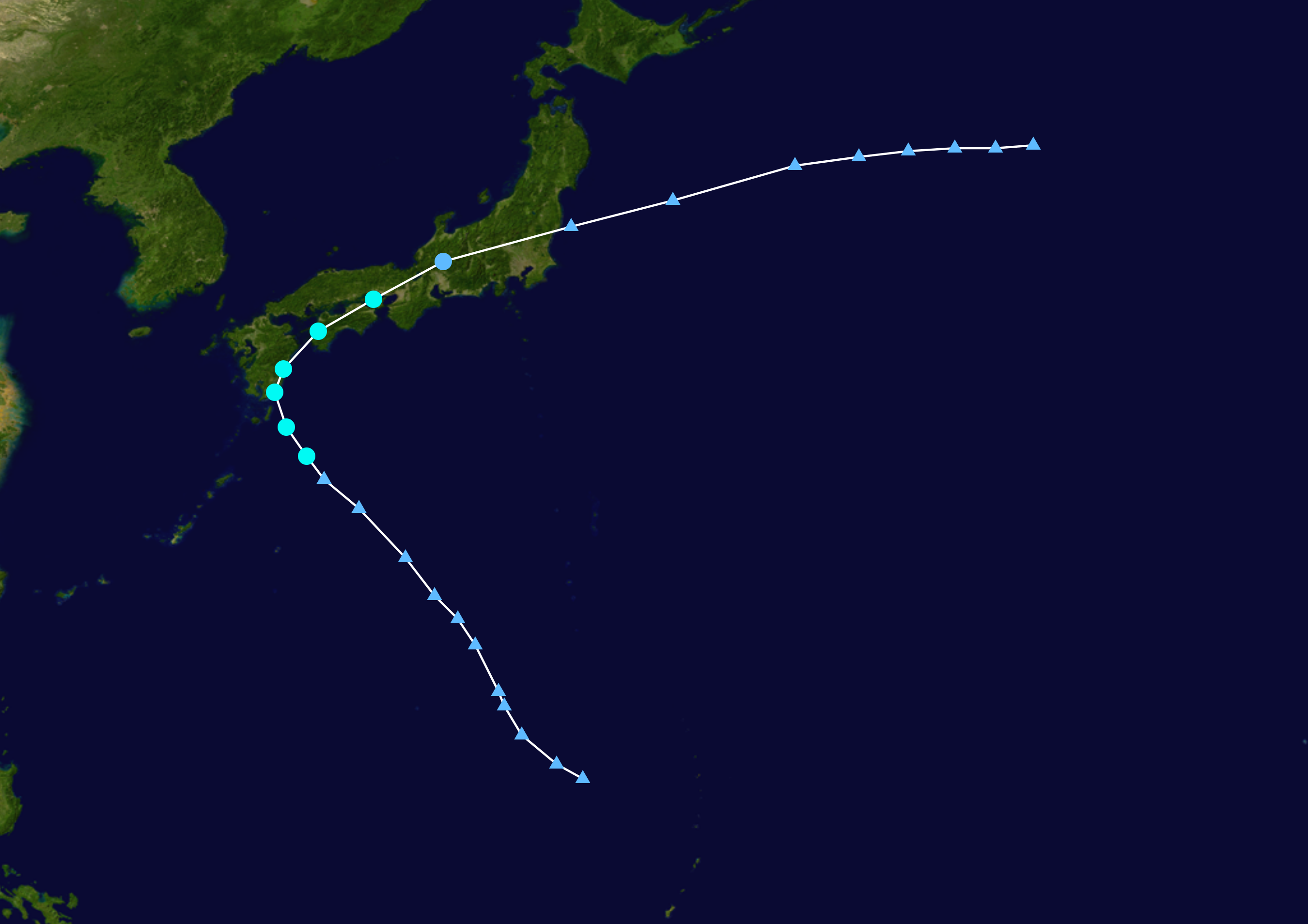
- Duration: September 11 – September 15
- Peak intensity: 85 km/h (50 mph) (10-min); 985 hPa (mbar)

The JTWC began to track a disturbance in a monsoon trough to the west of the Marianas Islands on September 11. The disturbance moved to the north without any significant development until September 13, when the outflow of the system markedly improved and it soon developed into a tropical depression to the east of Okinawa. The depression strengthened further becoming Tropical Storm Zia later that day as it approached Kyūshū. Zia peaked with 85 km/h (53 mph) winds as it made landfall on the island on September 14. The storm turned to the northeast and tracked over Japan and dissipated over central Honshū the next day.

Tropical Storm Zia brought heavy rain to western Japan, which exceeded 500 mm (20 in) in places. The resulting flooding and landslides prompted evacuations of over 14,000 people and stranded over 1,300 tourists in a Japanese mountain resort. Nine people died in Japan as a result of Tropical Storm Zia. Damages totaled to ¥2.1 billion (US$18.5 million).

=== Severe Tropical Storm Ann ===
- Severe tropical storm (JMA)
- Tropical storm (SSHWS)
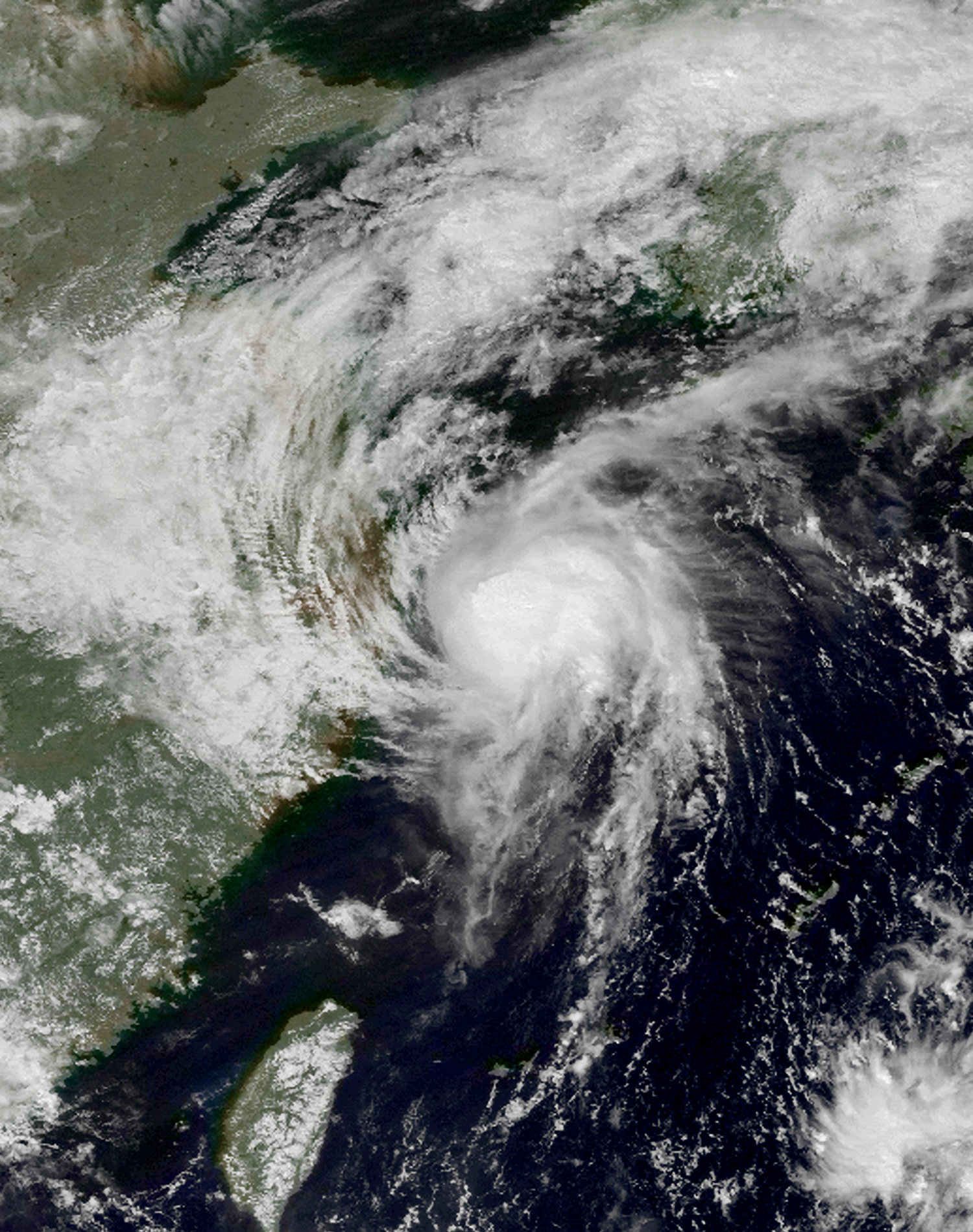
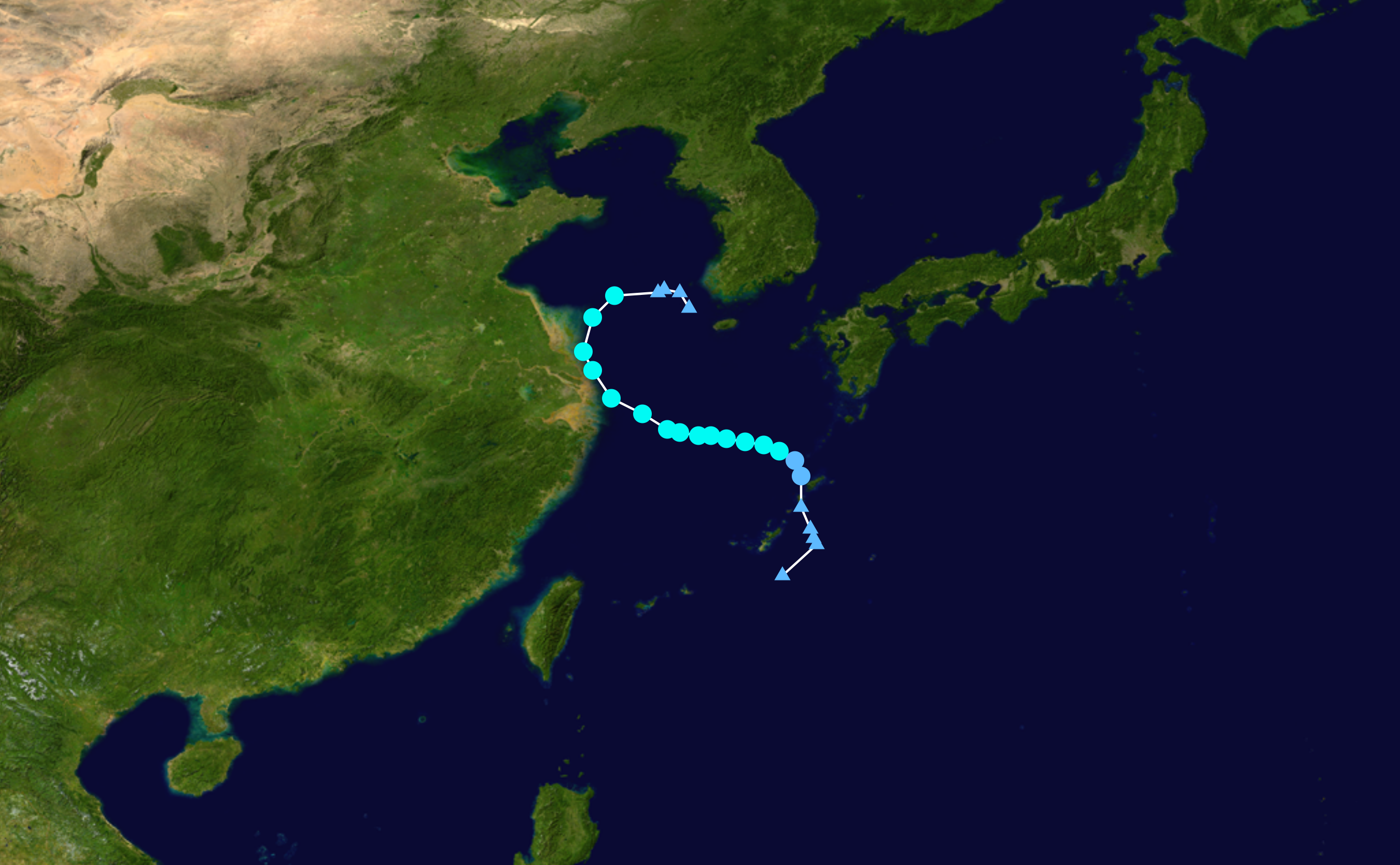
- Duration: September 14 – September 19
- Peak intensity: 95 km/h (60 mph) (10-min); 985 hPa (mbar)

Tropical Depression 23W formed about 165 km (103 mi) to the east of Okinawa on September 15, from a disturbance moving to the northwest under the influence of a subtropical high located on the eastern side of a monsoon trough. As the system developed it turned first to the northwest and then to the west, becoming Tropical Storm Ann a day after forming. As Ann approached the Chinese coast to the north of Shanghai on September 18, it reached its peak with 85 km/h (53 mph) winds and began to recurve to the northwest. The storm started to weaken as it entered a higher shear environment. Ann captured by a mid-level trough moving through the region and turned to the east, rapidly weakening as it crossed the Yellow Sea. The system dissipated just off the South Korean coast near Mokpo early on September 20.

Tropical Storm Ann brought moderate rain of up to 100 mm (3.9 in) to Anhui, Jiangsu and Shandong on September 18. Rains of up to 200 mm (7.9 in) from Ann and Typhoon Bart saturated South Korea and southwestern Japan, causing flooding and damage to rice paddies.

=== Super Typhoon Bart (Oniang) ===
- Very strong typhoon (JMA)
- Category 5 super typhoon (SSHWS)
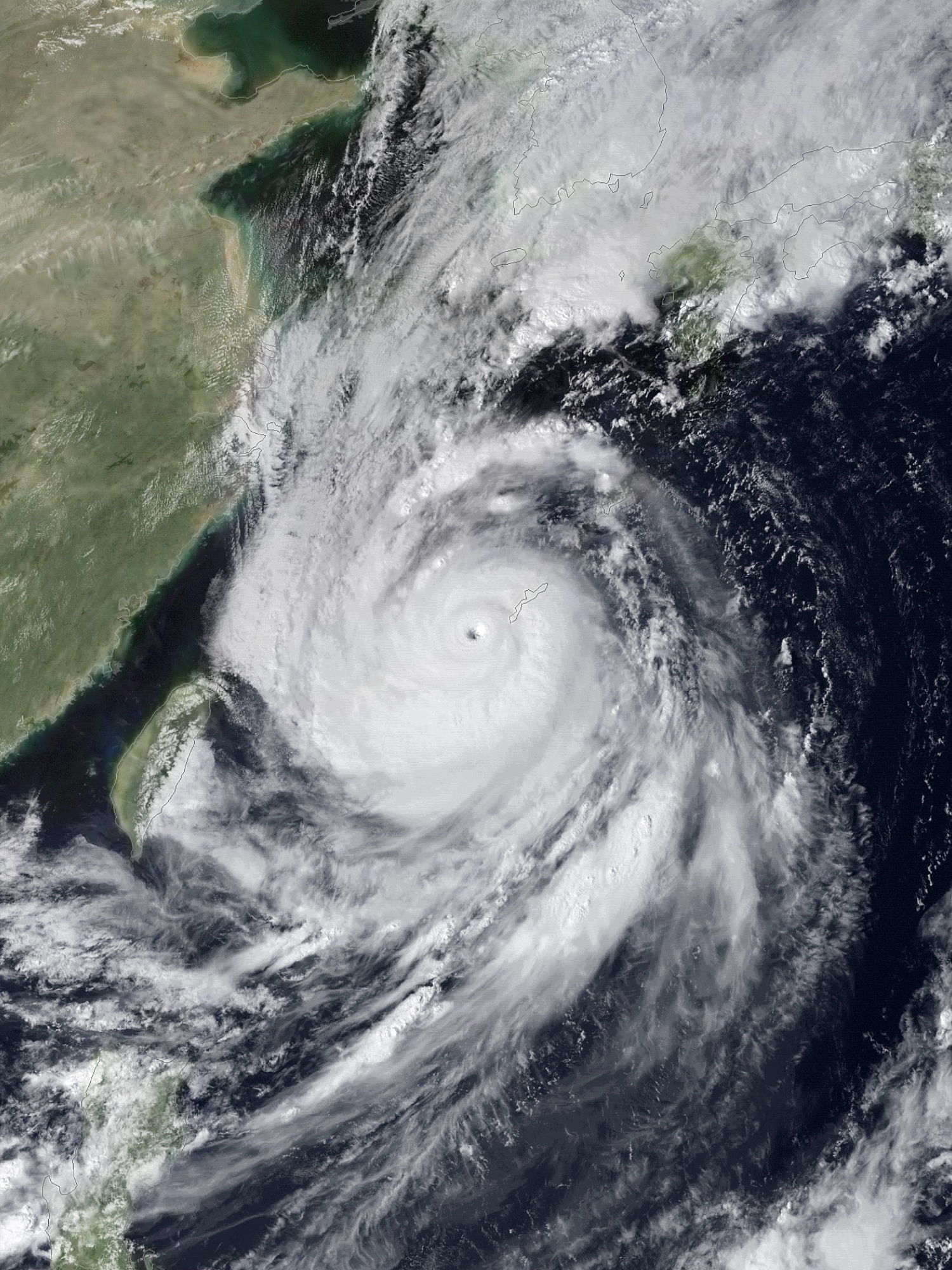
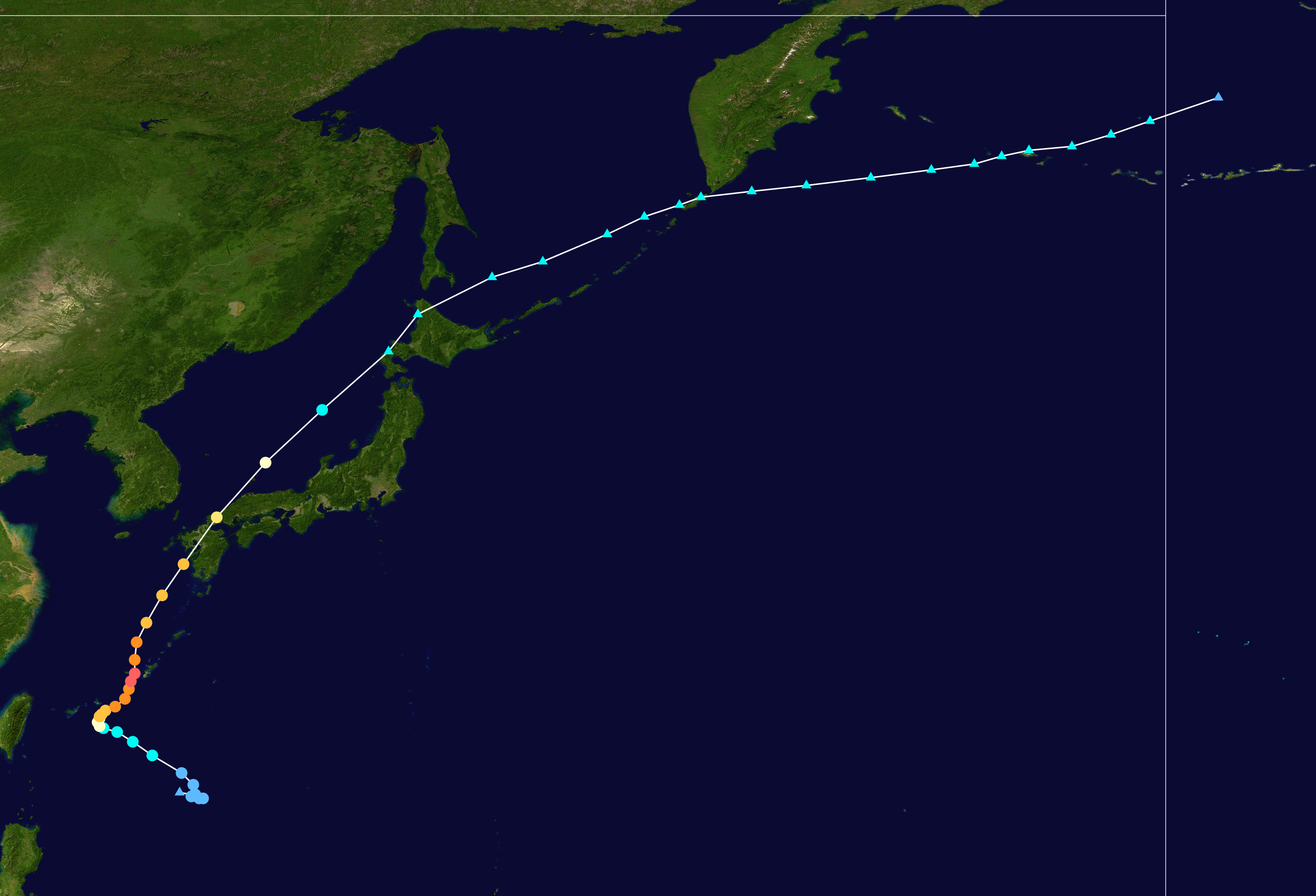
- Duration: September 17 – September 25
- Peak intensity: 165 km/h (105 mph) (10-min); 930 hPa (mbar)

Tropical Depression 24W developed on September 17, to the east of Taiwan. The storm drifted to the northwest, becoming Tropical Storm Bart on September 19 and reaching typhoon strength the next day. Bart intensified further as it turned to the northeast under the influence of an upper-level anticyclone. Typhoon Bart reached its peak on September 22 with 260 km/h (160 mph) winds when it passed 75 km (47 mi) to the west of Okinawa, becoming the only super typhoon during the 1999 Pacific typhoon season, and the last to have an English name. Afterwards, Bart began to weaken slowly as it continued north towards Kyūshū, Japan, which it struck on September 23 with 185 km/h (115 mph) winds. After crossing Kyūshū and western Honshū, the storm accelerated to the northeast in the Sea of Japan, becoming extratropical shortly before it reached northern Hokkaidō. As Typhoon Bart formed in PAGASA's area of responsibility, it was named Oniang by PAGASA before moving to the north.

Typhoon Bart claimed at least two lives on Okinawa and brought over 710 mm (28 in) of rain to the island. Kadena Air Base was badly damaged by the typhoon with over $5 million of damage on the base. Heavy flooding and landslides led to total of a 30 deaths and over 1,000 injuries in Japan. Over 800,000 homes lost power and 80,000 damaged in the aftermath of the storm. The worst damage was in Kumamoto Prefecture on Kyūshū, where 16 people died and over 45,000 homes were damaged. Bart affected the whole of Japan, with some minor damages occurring in Hokkaidō shortly after the storm became extratropical. A large crane in Hiroshima collapsed killing three and injuring four people in the Mitsubishi plant there and the Itsukushima Shrine was also damaged. Damage from the storm amounted to ¥16.31 billion (US$155 million); insurance payouts reached ¥31.47 billion (US$299 million). An additional $5 million (1999 USD) in damage occurred to the Japanese economy. Total damage is ¥163.1 billion (US$1.43 billion).

=== Tropical Storm Cam ===
- Tropical storm (JMA)
- Tropical storm (SSHWS)
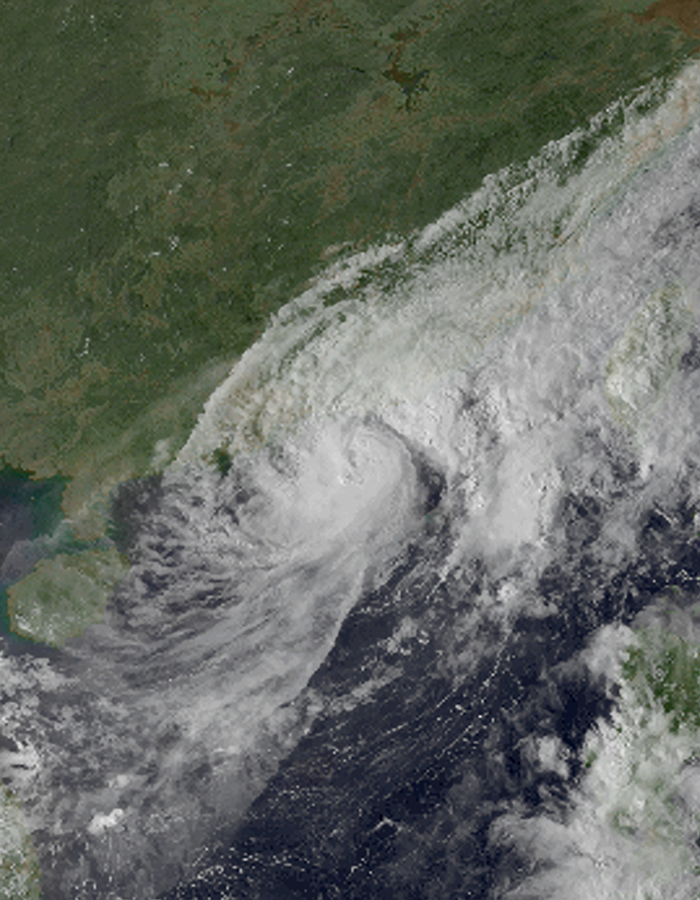
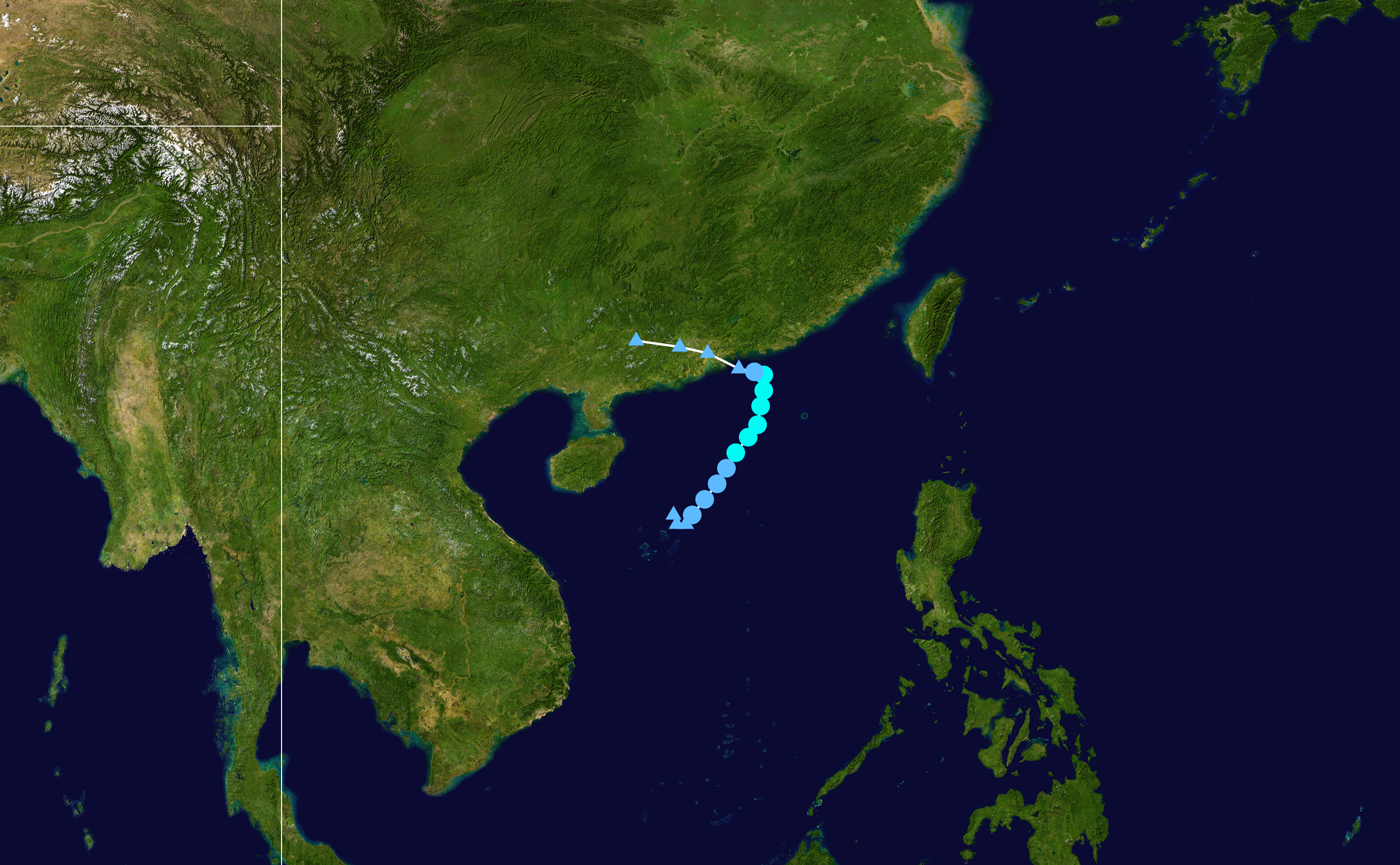
- Duration: September 22 – September 26
- Peak intensity: 85 km/h (50 mph) (10-min); 992 hPa (mbar)

A disturbed area of weather to the south of Hong Kong in the South China Sea became more organized early on September 23, and the JTWC issued a TCFA for the system. It developed into the 25th depression of the season per the JTWC a few hours later and began to track to the northeast, under the influence of a mid-level ridge to the east. The depression gradually intensified, becoming Tropical Storm Cam on September 24. Later that day, the storm reached its peak winds of 75 km/h (47 mph). Around this time, Cam's motion gradually turned towards the north. As it neared the Chinese coast a strong ridge to the north turned Cam abruptly to the west, towards Hong Kong and it began to weaken. The JTWC issued its last warning while the storm was still at sea, shortly before it made landfall over Hong Kong with 35 km/h (22 mph) winds. The storm dissipated over China on September 26.

As Tropical Storm Cam approached Hong Kong, the HKO hoisted the No. 8 Signal for the fifth time in the year; the last time this had occurred was in 1964. The highest gust recorded on land was 121 km/h (75 mph) on Tai Mo Shan, and 41 mm (1.6 in) of rain fell on Hong Kong. Cam was responsible for 23 injuries in Hong Kong and one death in a ship off Stonecutters Island. There was limited flooding in the region and about 150 people were evacuated to emergency shelters. There was some disruption to air travel into the territory, with 100 flights cancelled or delayed.

=== Typhoon Dan (Pepang) ===
- Typhoon (JMA)
- Category 3 typhoon (SSHWS)
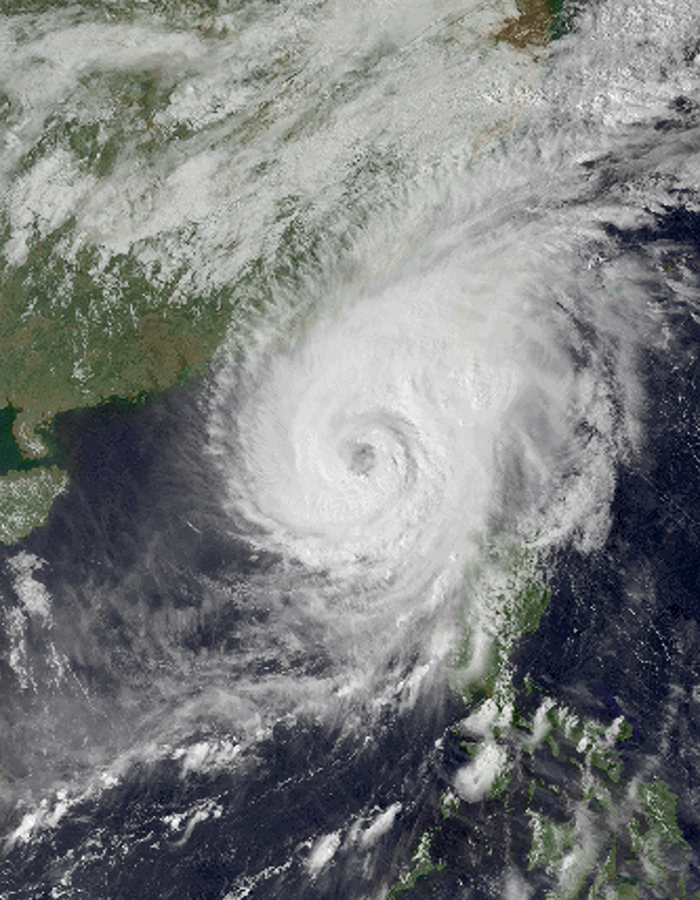
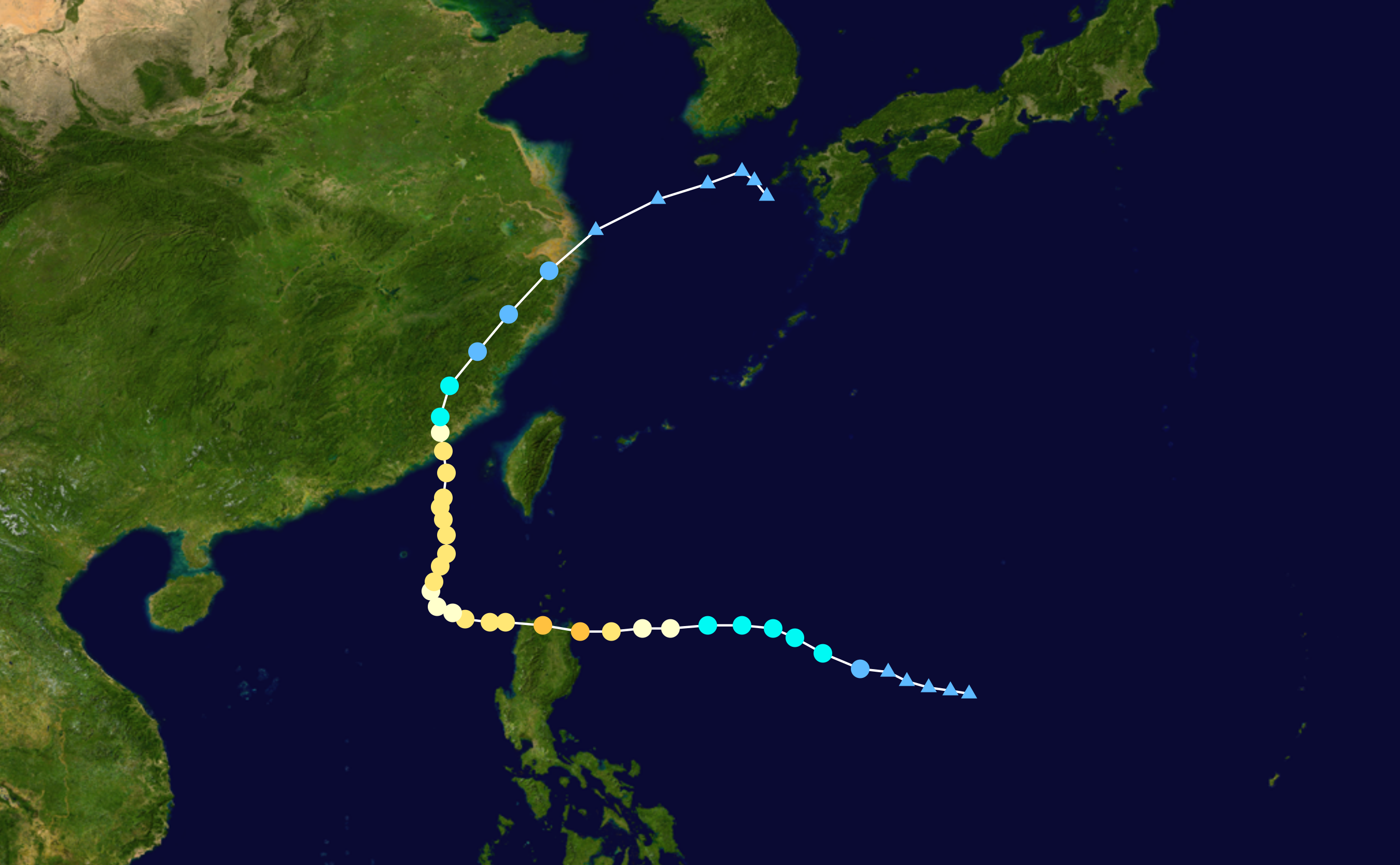
- Duration: October 2 – October 10
- Peak intensity: 150 km/h (90 mph) (10-min); 955 hPa (mbar)

Tropical Depression 26W developed over the Philippine Sea on October 1 about 750 km (470 mi) to the east of Luzon. The system intensified as it moved west-northwest, becoming Tropical Storm Dan on October 3 before reaching typhoon strength the next day. Typhoon Dan reached its peak with 205 km/h (127 mph) early on October 5 and hit northern Luzon at that strength. The typhoon weakened as it entered the South China Sea, but re-intensified as it turned towards the north. Typhoon Dan made its second landfall near Xiamen, China on October 9 and weakened overland. Dan turned to the northeast and weakened to a tropical depression before it moved over the Yellow Sea late on October 10. The depression was absorbed by a frontal system over the Yellow Sea early the next day. Both the JMA and PAGASA treated this storm as a typhoon, with PAGASA naming it Pepang.

Typhoon Dan brought torrential rain of up to 500 mm (20 in) to both northern Luzon and southern Taiwan. Flooding in the Philippines affected 2,600 homes and killed at least five people. There was more than $2 million of damage to agriculture in the Philippines. Southern Taiwan was still recovering from the Chi-Chi earthquake of the previous month, and Dan delayed the recovery efforts. The typhoon burst a dike in Kaohsiung and another in Tainan, that had been damaged by the earthquake. Dan knocked down a large number of trees on Kinmen, which led to the disruption of 70% of the island's power supply. Several fishing boats were sunk and house damaged on Penghu. Thirty-four died and 1,400 people were injured as a result of the storm in Fujian. 1,500 houses were destroyed and $240 million of damage occurred in the province. Dan was the worst typhoon to hit Xiamen in 46 years, killing five and injuring over 100 in the city.

=== Tropical Storm Eve (Rening) ===
- Tropical storm (JMA)
- Tropical storm (SSHWS)
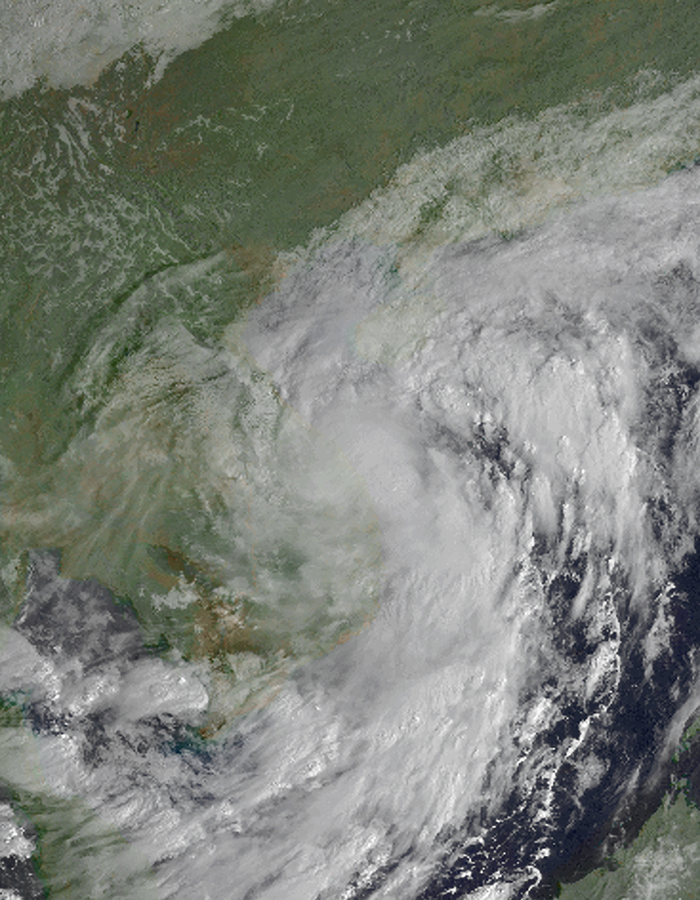
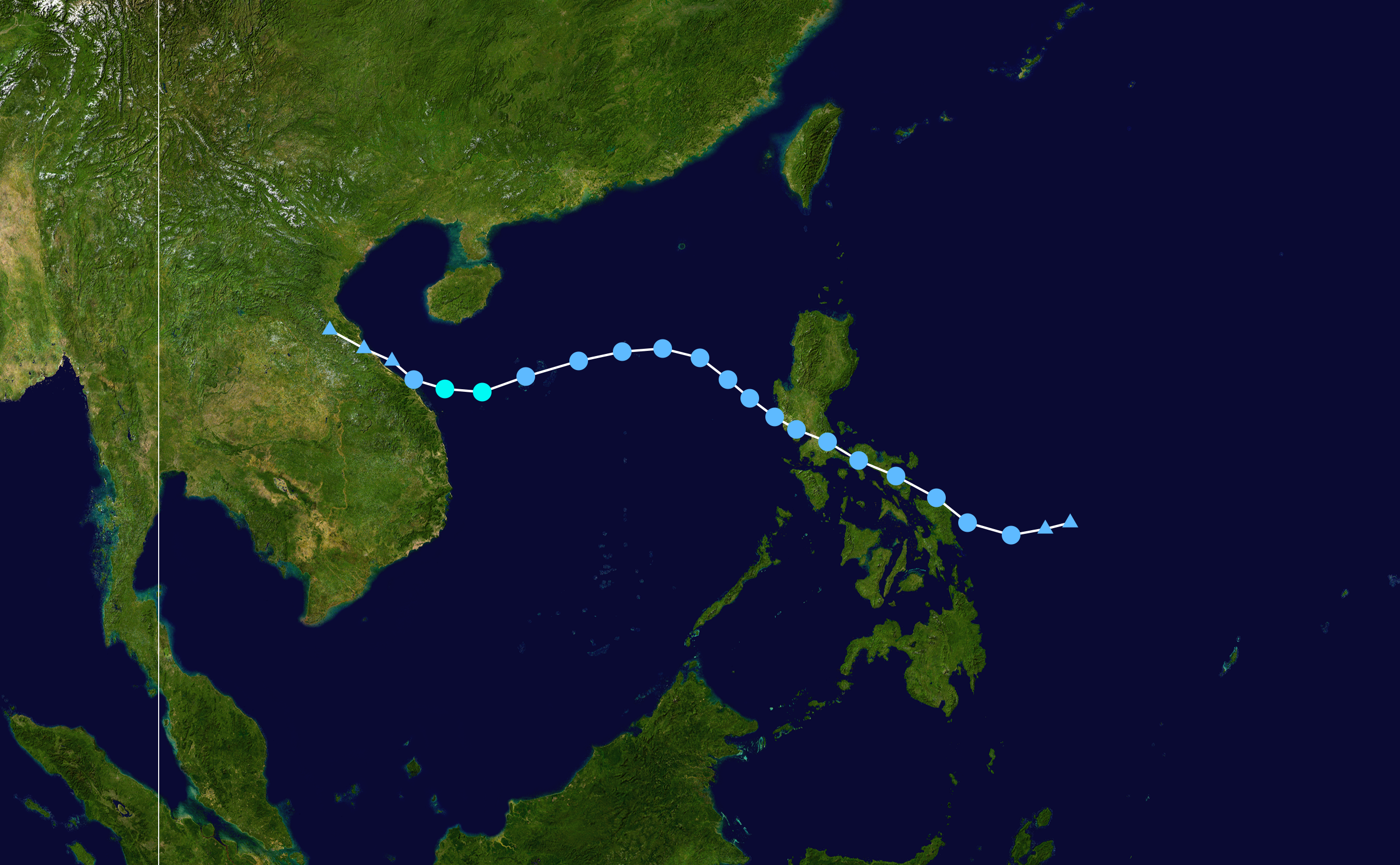
- Duration: October 15 – October 20
- Peak intensity: 85 km/h (50 mph) (10-min); 990 hPa (mbar)

A broad area of convection to the northeast of Mindanao over the Philippine Sea began to develop on October 15 as it moved to the west, becoming Tropical Depression 27W. The depression made landfall on Samar Island the same day and moved to the northwest across the central Philippines throughout October 6. The depression turned to the west after it emerged into the South China Sea, and turned to the southwest on October 18 in response to increasing mid-level ridging over southeastern China. As it neared the Vietnamese coast the depression strengthened slightly and became Tropical Storm Eve. Eve made landfall 110 km (68 mi) southeast of Da Nang as a minimal tropical storm on October 19 and quickly dissipated overland. Both the JMA and PAGASA considered Eve a tropical storm, with PAGASA naming it Rening.

Tropical Storm Eve brought torrential rain to much of central Vietnam, with about 290 mm (11 in) falling on Huế City and as much as 470 mm (19 in) of rain falling in parts of Hà Tĩnh Province. Eve was the first in a series of storms to bring torrential rain to the region, and the resulting floods killed over 622 people, and they also caused nearly $235 million of damage directly.

=== Tropical Depression 28W ===
- Tropical depression (JMA)
- Tropical depression (SSHWS)
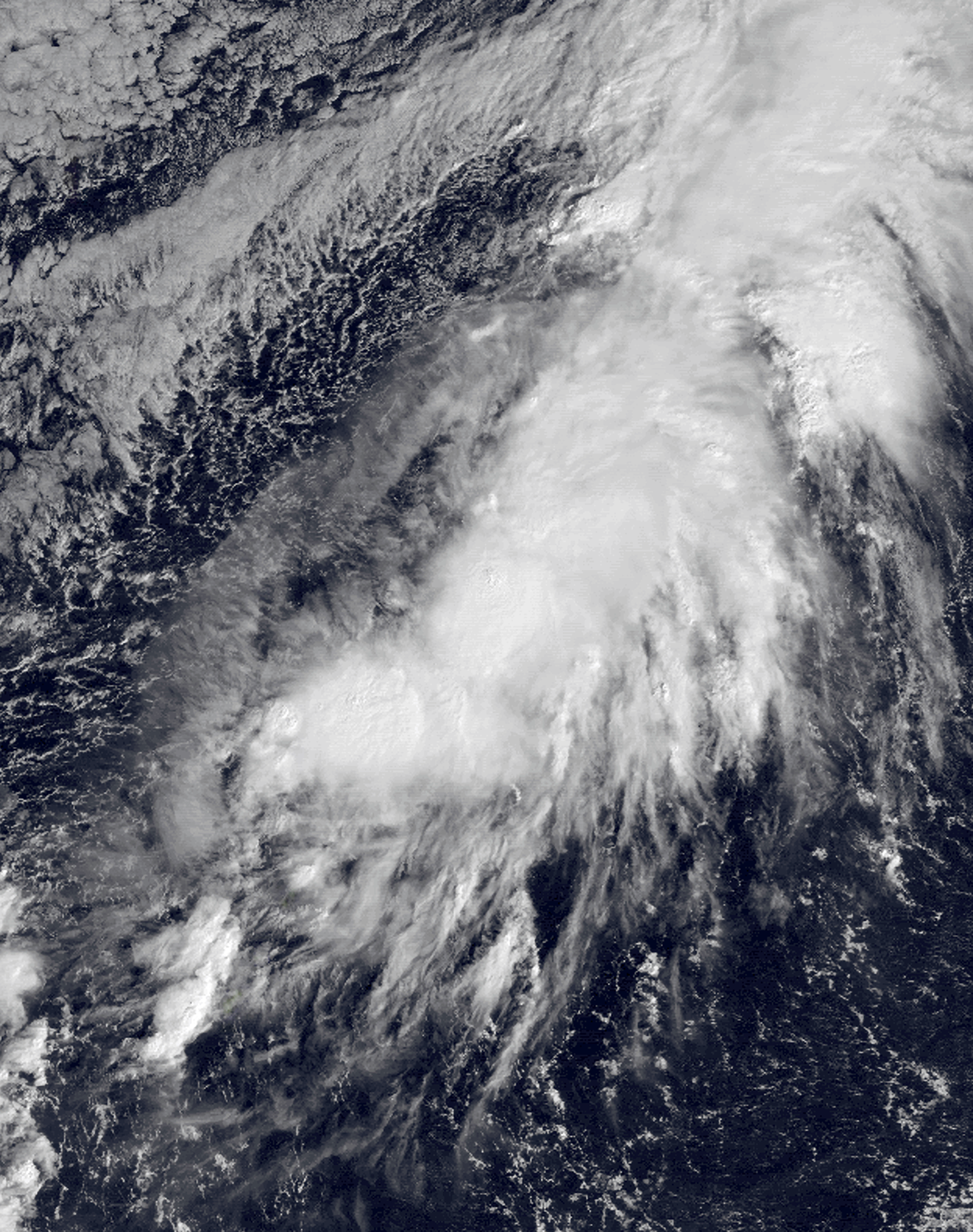
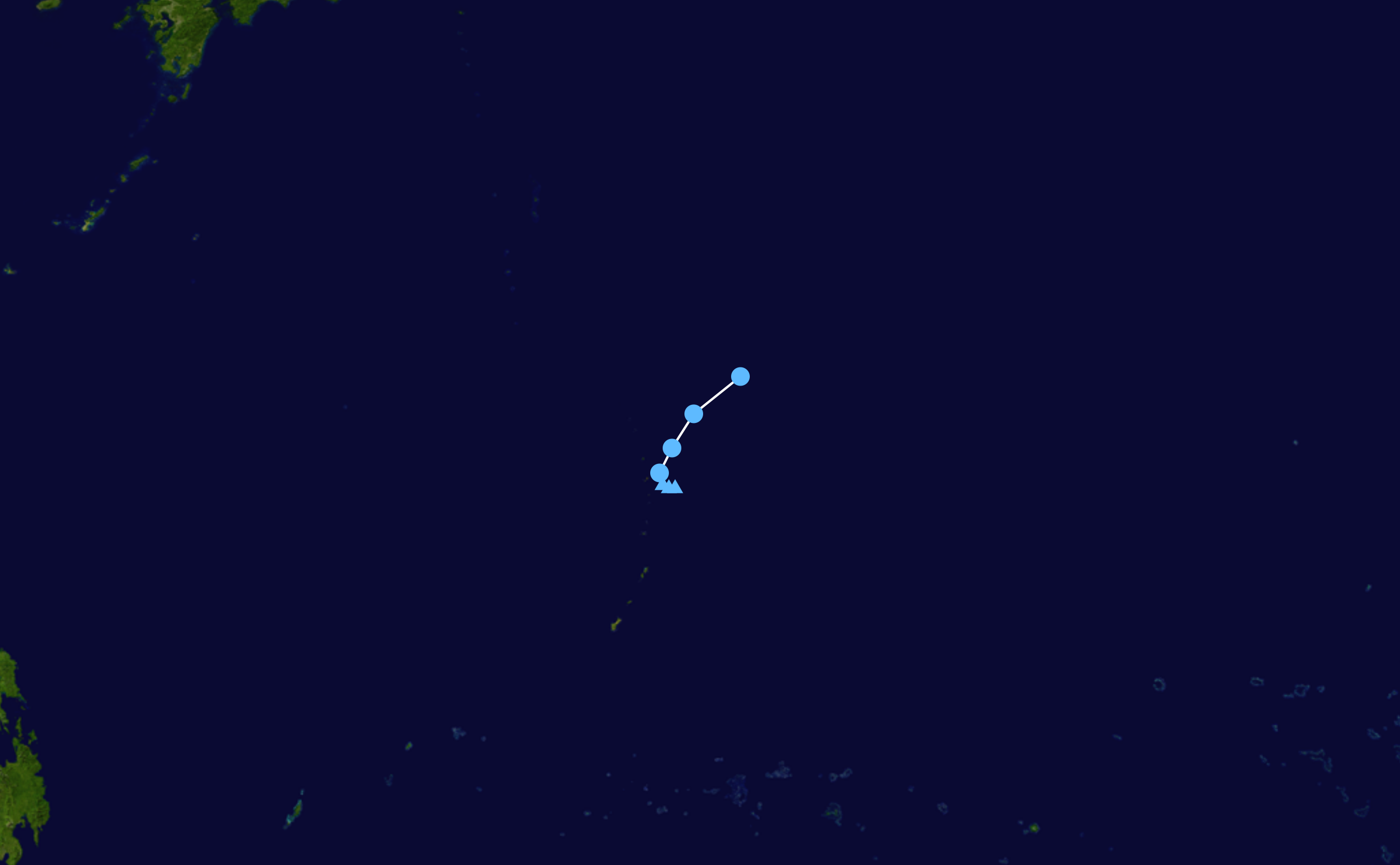
- Duration: November 5 – November 6
- Peak intensity: 55 km/h (35 mph) (10-min); 1000 hPa (mbar)

A tropical disturbance began to develop 45 km (28 mi) to the southeast of Agrihan, an island of the Northern Mariana Islands, early on November 5, from the tail end of shear line connected to a front that ran to Japan. It strengthened into Tropical Depression 28W early the next day and moved to the northeast along the shear line, reaching its peak with 55 km/h (34 mph) winds. The depression did not develop further, but its motion accelerated and it became an extratropical low 18 hours after forming.

=== Tropical Depression Frankie (Sendang) ===
- Tropical depression (JMA)
- Tropical storm (SSHWS)
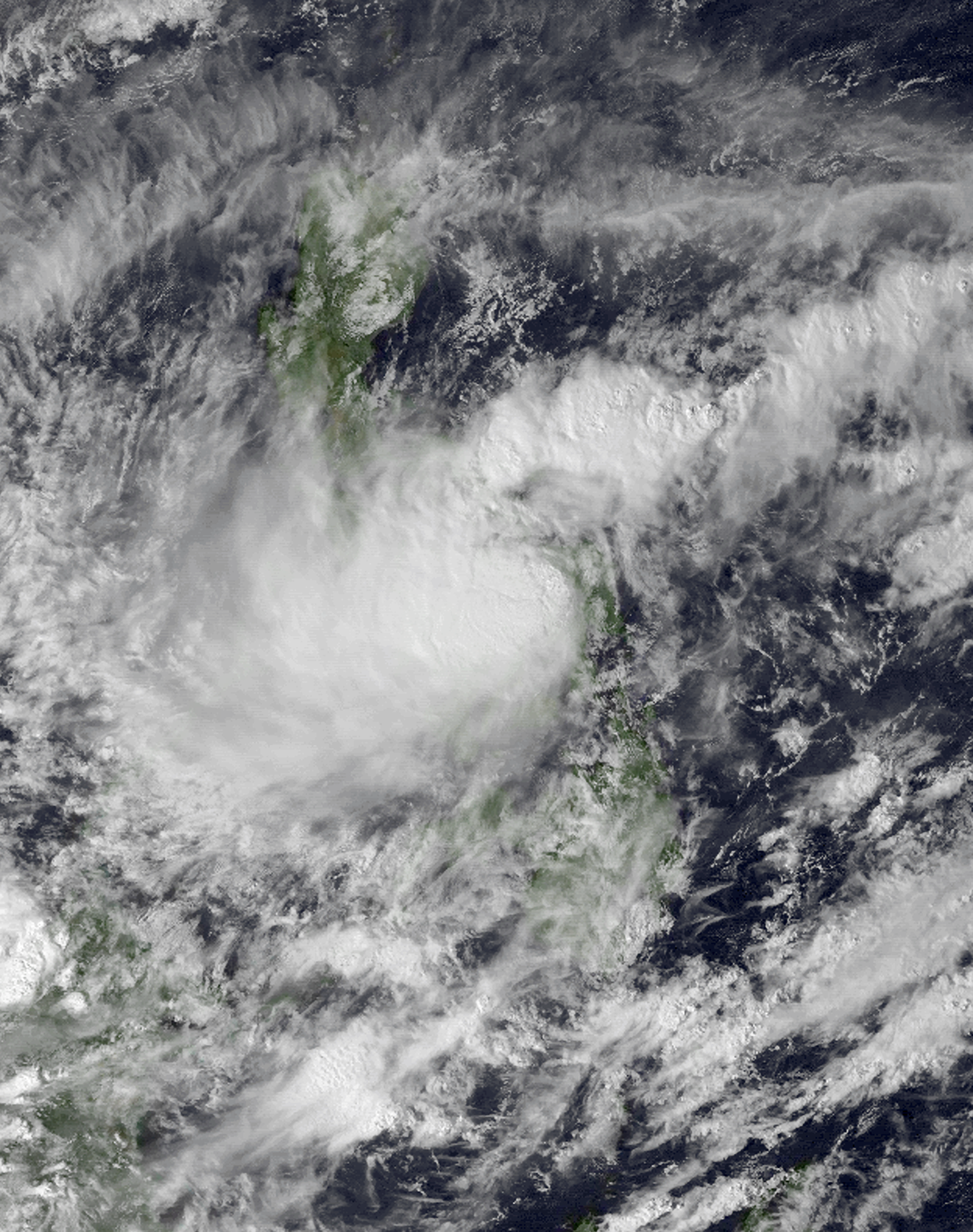
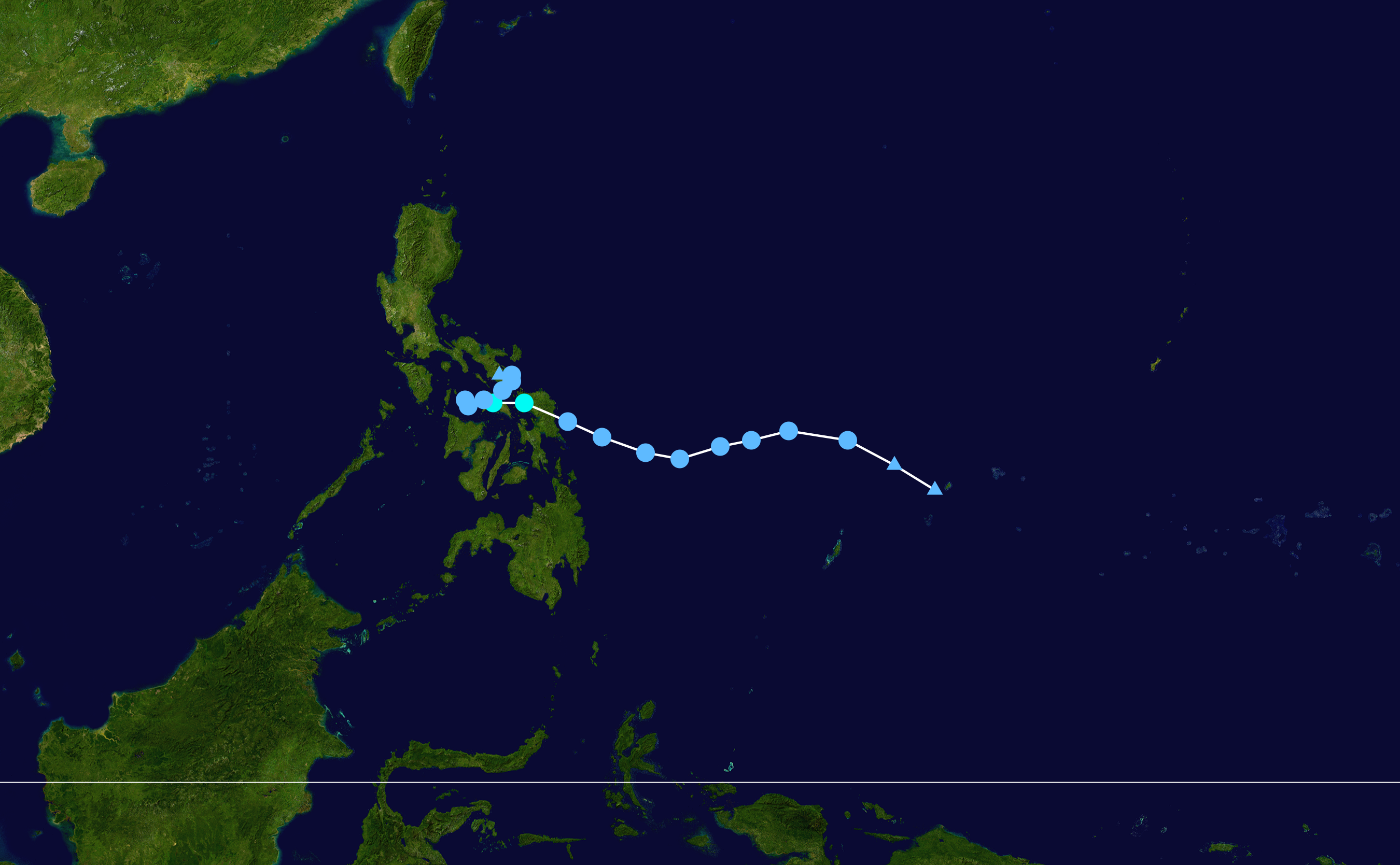
- Duration: November 6 – November 10
- Peak intensity: 55 km/h (35 mph) (10-min); 994 hPa (mbar)

A disturbance to the northeast of Koror in the Philippine Sea developed as it moved to the west on November 6, becoming Tropical Depression 29W. The depression moved rapidly to the west under the influence of the subtropical ridge to the north, crossing Samar early on November 8. The system strengthened over the central Philippines, becoming Tropical Storm Frankie. The influence of a developing ridge to the southeast led to Frankie becoming quasi-stationary over the Sibuyan Sea. The storm soon weakened due to increasing wind shear and interaction with land, and it dissipated on November 11. PAGASA tracked Frankie as a tropical storm, naming it Sendang. The JMA considered this storm to have been a tropical depression.

Tropical Storm Frankie brought heavy rain of up to 300 mm (12 in) to the central Philippines, that disrupted the rice harvest. Flooding from the storm forced the evacuation of 300 families in Calbayog.

=== Severe Tropical Storm Gloria (Trining) ===
- Severe tropical storm (JMA)
- Category 1 typhoon (SSHWS)
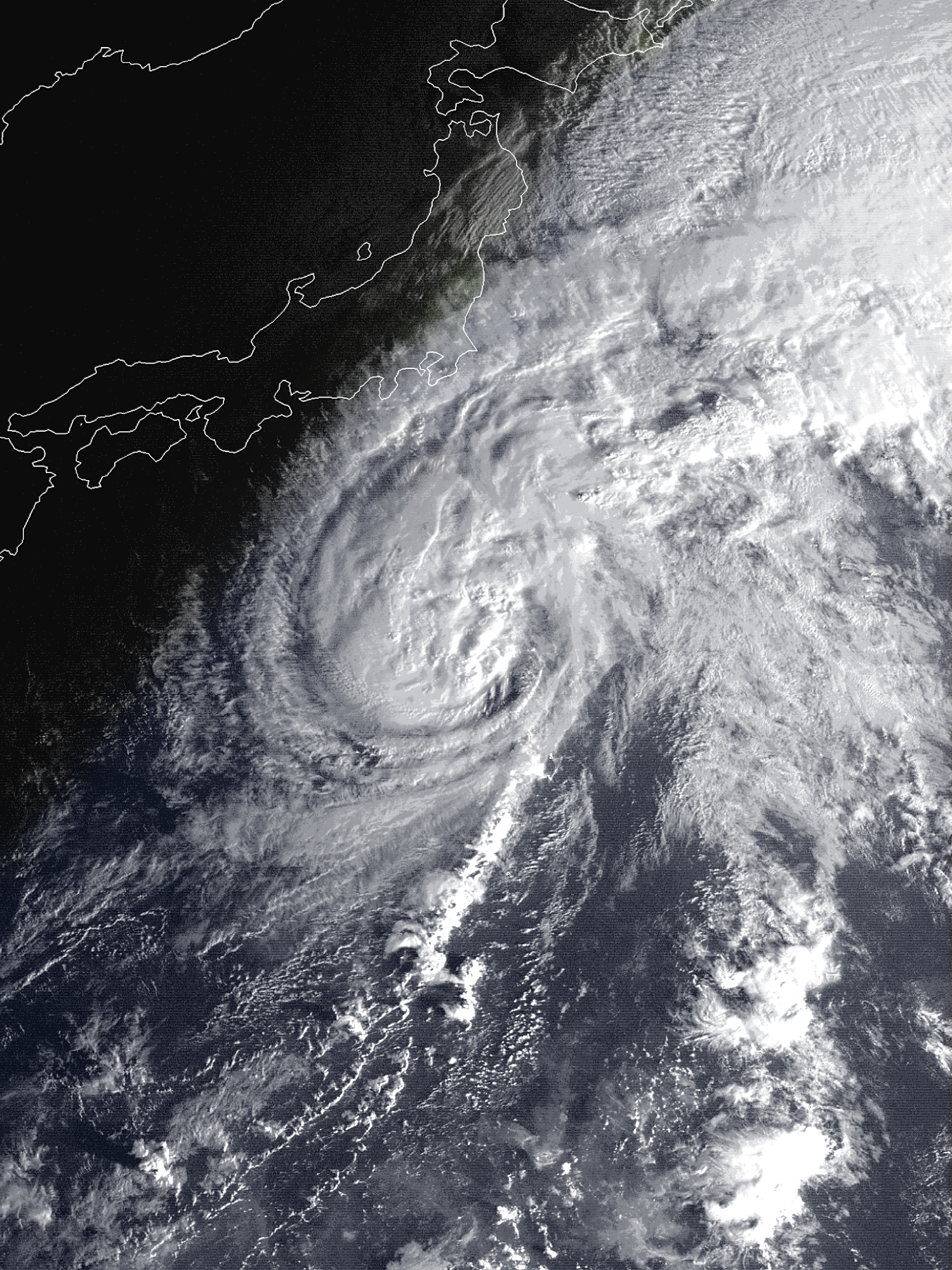
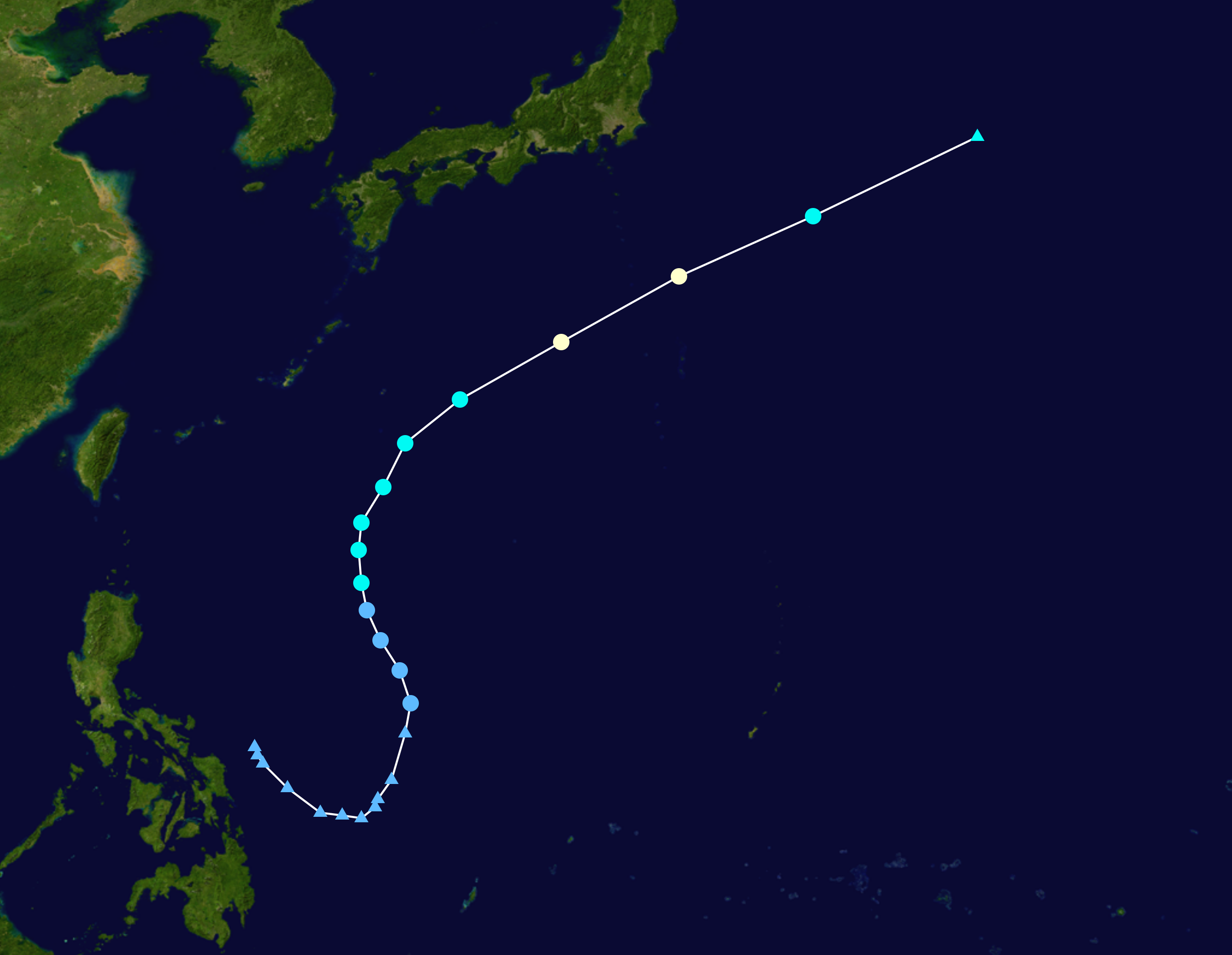
- Duration: November 13 – November 19
- Peak intensity: 95 km/h (60 mph) (10-min); 980 hPa (mbar)

In mid-November, a persistent area of circulation developed at the end of a shear line to the east of Samar. It began to become more organized as it moved to the north on November 12 and became a tropical depression the next day. The cyclone continued to slowly intensify, becoming Tropical Storm Gloria as it turned the northeast, when it was well to the east of Luzon. Gloria began to accelerate to the northeast under the influence of an upper level flow and maintained its strength. The storm passed east of Okinawa on November 15, when the shear markedly reduced and allowed a rapid intensification to typhoon strength. Gloria briefly peaked as a 120 km/h (75 mph) typhoon later that day, before weakening as it started to become extratropical. Typhoon Gloria became fully extratropical on November 16, having weakened back into a tropical storm.

Both the JMA and PAGASA monitored Gloria, with PAGASA naming the storm Trining. The JMA assessed Gloria as being a severe tropical storm at its peak strength on November 15. Typhoon Gloria did not approach land closely. Gloria is the last typhoon to use English names in the basin.

=== Tropical Depression 31W ===
- Tropical depression (SSHWS)
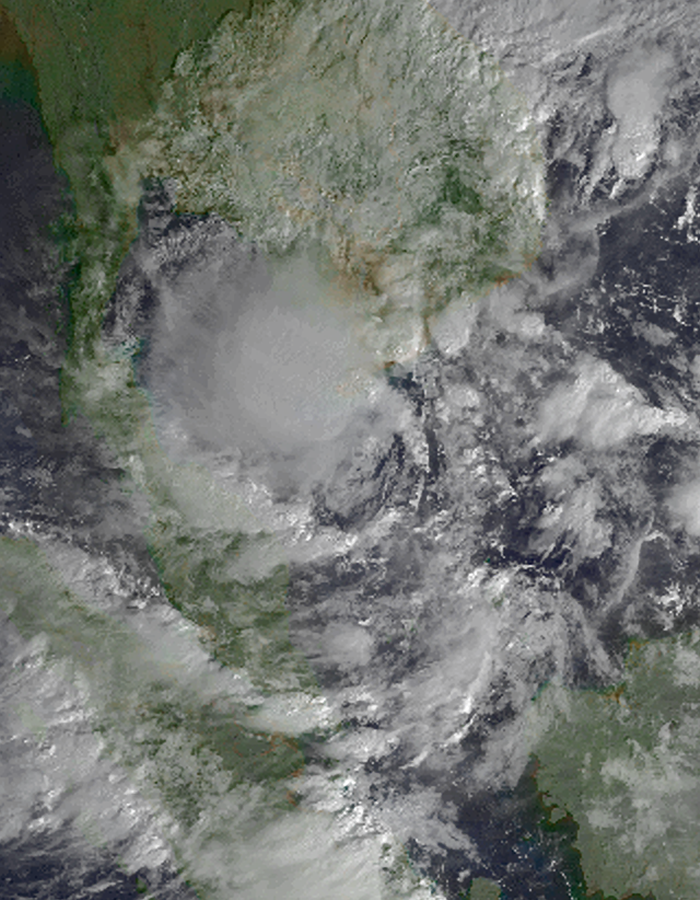
- Duration: December 1 – December 4 (Exited basin)
- Peak intensity: 55 km/h (35 mph) (1-min); 1000 hPa (mbar)

An area of low pressure just off Palawan became more organized as it moved to the northwest, away from the island, becoming Tropical Depression 31W early on December 1. A subtropical ridge to the north of the system caused it to move southwest through the South China Sea and off the Vietnamese coast. Winds from the depression peaked at 55 km/h (34 mph). Early on, December 3, when the storm was to the south of Vietnam, it turned to the northwest and headed towards the Malay Peninsula. The depression made landfall in Thailand to the northeast of Phuket on December 4, and the JTWC ceased advisories as the storm weakened overland. The remnants entered the Andaman Sea but redevelopment did not occur.

=== Tropical Depression 32W ===
- Tropical depression (SSHWS)
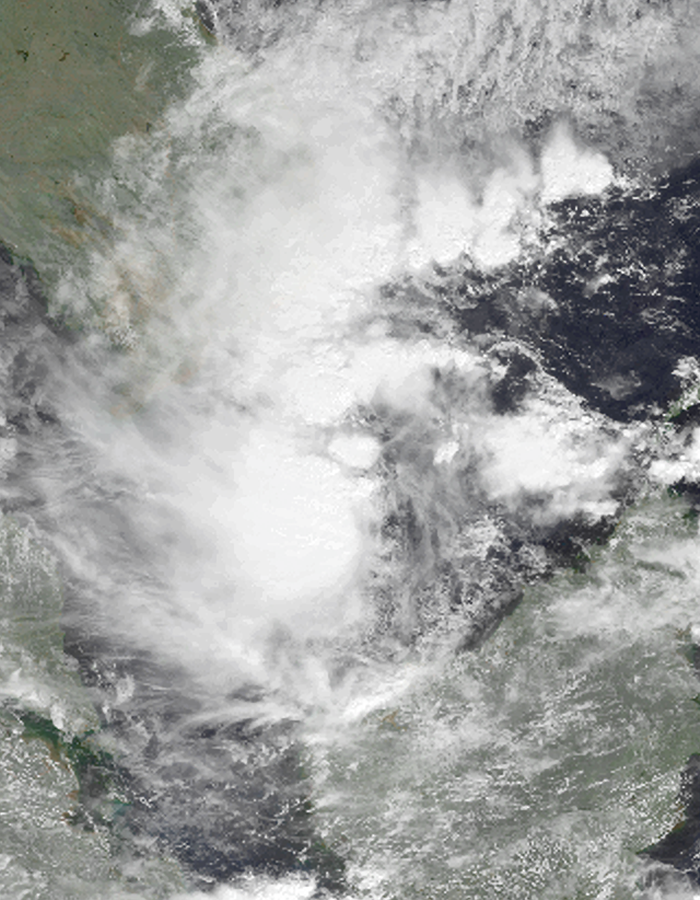
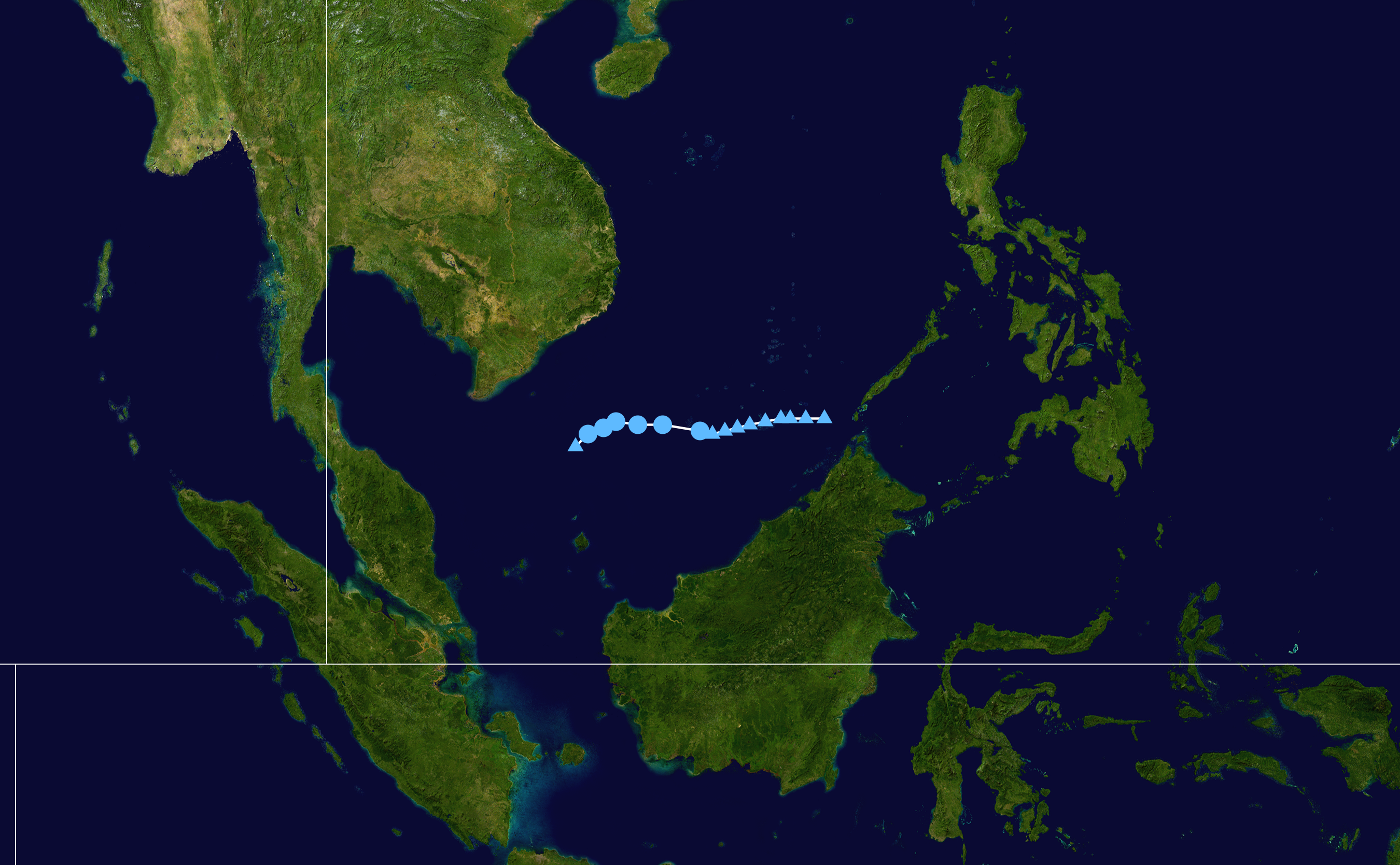
- Duration: December 9 – December 11
- Peak intensity: 55 km/h (35 mph) (1-min); 1000 hPa (mbar)

Tropical Depression 32W developed on December 9 in the South China Sea, between Palawan and Borneo and slowly moved to the west. After the depression reached its peak with 55 km/h (34 mph) winds it began to accelerate to the west. By December 11, when the storm was to the south of Vietnam, it became more sheared and the low-level circulation became exposed. The system dissipated soon afterwards, having never approached land.

=== Tropical Depression 33W ===
- Tropical depression (HKO)
- Tropical depression (SSHWS)
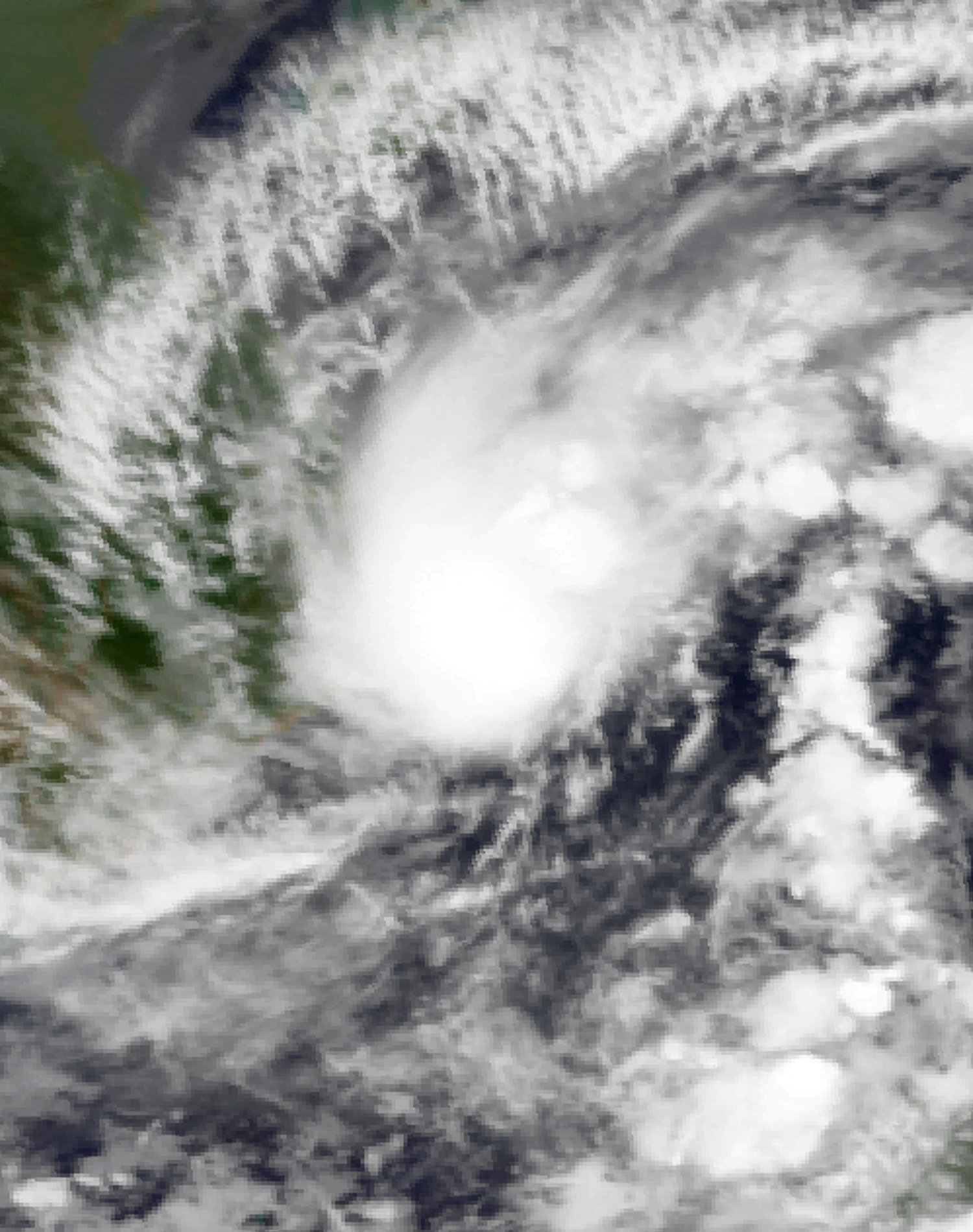
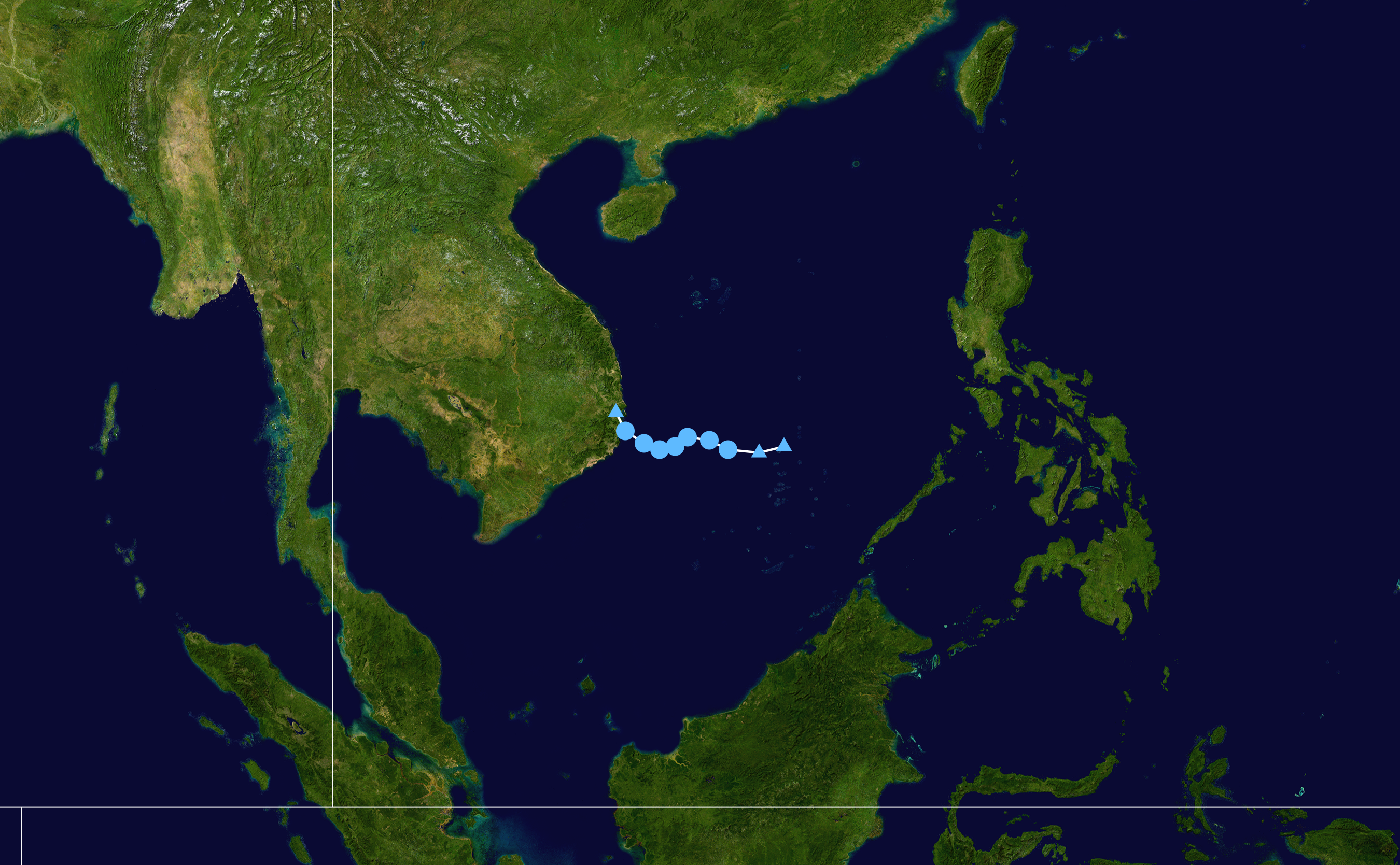
- Duration: December 14 – December 19
- Peak intensity: 55 km/h (35 mph) (10-min); 1000 hPa (mbar)

On December 14, Tropical Depression 33W formed within a persistent trough about 425 km (264 mi) to the east of Cam Ranh Bay, Vietnam. A high level of wind shear restricted the storm's strength to 55 km/h (34 mph), which it maintained as it moved west towards Vietnam. The storm turned to the north shortly before it made landfall on December 16 and dissipated soon after over Vietnam under the influence of increased wind shear and interaction with land.

In Vietnam, the system, locally known as Storm No. 10 (Vietnamese: Bão số 10), caused heavy rainfall in South Central Coast provinces from Bình Định to Phú Yên.

== Other systems ==
On October 21, an area of convection formed in the Sulu Sea and emerged over the South China Sea on the next day. Thunderstorm activity started to increase and the Joint Typhoon Warning Center issued a Tropical Cyclone Formation Alert (TCFA) on the system. However, the low failed to develop further and this caused the cancellation of the TCFA. On October 24, the low crossed the Malay Peninsula and emerged into the North Indian Ocean. On the next day, while over the Andaman Sea, the low became a tropical depression, which became the deadly 1999 Odisha cyclone.

== Storm names ==
During the season 21 named tropical cyclones developed in the Western Pacific and were named by the Joint Typhoon Warning Center, when it was determined that they had become tropical storms. These names were contributed to a revised list from 1996. However, the agency stopped naming cyclones after this season as the Japan Meteorological Agency started naming systems. Consequently, this was the last year the following lists were used.

Hilda	Iris	Jacob	Kate	Leo	Maggie	Neil	Olga	Paul	Rachel	Sam	Tanya
Virgil	Wendy	York	Zia	Ann	Bart	Cam	Dan	Eve	Frankie	Gloria	

=== Philippines ===
Auring	Bebeng	Karing	Diding	Etang
Gening	Helming	Ising	Luding	Mameng
Neneng	Oniang	Pepang	Rening	Sendang
Trining	Ulding (unused)	Warling (unused)	Yayang (unused)	
Auxiliary list
				Ading (unused)
Barang (unused)	Krising (unused)	Dadang (unused)	Erling (unused)	Goying (unused)

The Philippine Atmospheric, Geophysical and Astronomical Services Administration uses its own naming scheme for tropical cyclones in their area of responsibility. PAGASA assigns names to tropical depressions that form within their area of responsibility and any tropical cyclone that might move into their area of responsibility. Should the list of names for a given year prove to be insufficient, names are taken from an auxiliary list, the first 10 of which are published each year before the season starts. This is the same list used for the 1995 season. PAGASA uses its own naming scheme that starts in the Filipino alphabet, with names of Filipino female names ending with "ng" (A, B, K, D, etc.). Because PAGASA started a new naming scheme in 2001, therefore, this naming list would not be used in the 2003 season. Names that were not assigned/going to use are marked in gray.

== Season effects ==
This table summarizes all the systems that developed within or moved into the North Pacific Ocean, to the west of the International Date Line during 1999. The tables also provide an overview of a systems intensity, duration, land areas affected and any deaths or damages associated with the system.

Name	Dates	Peak intensity			Areas affected	Damage (USD)	Deaths	Ref(s).
Name	Dates	Category	Wind speed	Pressure	Areas affected	Damage (USD)	Deaths	Ref(s).
Hilda (Auring)	January 3 – 8	Tropical depression	55 km/h (34 mph)	1000 hPa (29.53 inHg)	Malaysia	$1.3 million	5	
TD	February 9 – 10	Tropical depression	Not specified	1004 hPa (29.65 inHg)	None	None	None	
Iris (Bebeng)	February 14 – 19	Tropical depression	55 km/h (34 mph)	1000 hPa (29.53 inHg)	None	None	None	
Jacob (Karing)	April 7 – 10	Tropical depression	55 km/h (34 mph)	1006 hPa (29.71 inHg)	Philippines	None	None	
Kate (Diding)	April 21 – 28	Severe tropical storm	100 km/h (62 mph)	980 hPa (28.94 inHg)	Philippines	None	None	
Leo	April 27 – May 2	Strong typhoon	120 km/h (75 mph)	970 hPa (28.64 inHg)	South China	None	None	
Maggie (Etang)	June 1 – 9	Strong typhoon	120 km/h (75 mph)	970 hPa (28.64 inHg)	Philippines, Taiwan, South China	$168 million	9	
TD	June 1 – 2	Tropical depression	Not specified	1004 hPa (29.65 inHg)	None	None	None	
Gening	June 3 – 6	Tropical depression	55 km/h (34 mph)	996 hPa (29.41 inHg)	None	None	None	
TD	July 9 – 15	Tropical depression	55 km/h (34 mph)	996 hPa (29.41 inHg)	Japan	None	None	
07W	July 14 – 18	Tropical storm	65 km/h (40 mph)	996 hPa (29.41 inHg)	None	None	None	
08W	July 19 – 23	Tropical depression	Not specified	1004 hPa (29.65 inHg)	None	None	None	
Neil (Heling)	July 22 – 28	Severe tropical storm	95 km/h (59 mph)	980 hPa (28.94 inHg)	Japan, Korea	$6.09 million	15	
10W	July 23 – 28	Tropical storm	75 km/h (47 mph)	985 hPa (29.09 inHg)	China	None	None	
Olga (Ising)	July 29 – August 3	Strong typhoon	120 km/h (75 mph)	970 hPa (28.64 inHg)	Caroline Islands, Ryukyu Islands, Korea	$657 million	266	
Paul	August 3 – 9	Tropical storm	85 km/h (53 mph)	980 hPa (28.94 inHg)	Mariana Islands, Japan, South Korea, China	$56,000	None	
Rachel	August 5 – 11	Tropical storm	65 km/h (40 mph)	992 hPa (29.29 inHg)	Taiwan, Ryukyu Islands, China	None	None	
14W	August 7 – 11	Tropical depression	Not specified	1004 hPa (29.65 inHg)	Japan	None	None	
TD	August 9 – 11	Tropical depression	Not specified	1000 hPa (29.53 inHg)	None	None	None	
TD	August 11	Tropical depression	Not specified	1000 hPa (29.53 inHg)	None	None	None	
TD	August 11 – 16	Tropical depression	Not specified	1000 hPa (29.53 inHg)	Japan	None	None	
15W	August 14 – 20	Tropical depression	Not specified	1000 hPa (29.53 inHg)	Japan	None	None	
TD	August 16 – 17	Tropical depression	Not specified	1010 hPa (29.83 inHg)	None	None	None	
Sam (Luding)	August 18 – 24	Severe tropical storm	100 km/h (62 mph)	980 hPa (28.94 inHg)	Philippines, South China	$35 million	28	
Tanya	August 19 – 24	Severe tropical storm	95 km/h (59 mph)	1000 hPa (29.53 inHg)	Wake Island	None	None	
Dora	August 20 – 26	Severe tropical storm	95 km/h (59 mph)	990 hPa (29.23 inHg)	Wake Island	None	None	
18W	August 21 – 24	Tropical depression	Not specified	1010 hPa (29.83 inHg)	None	None	None	
Virgil	August 23 – 29	Severe tropical storm	95 km/h (59 mph)	1000 hPa (29.53 inHg)	None	None	None	
TD	August 30	Tropical depression	Not specified	1008 hPa (29.77 inHg)	None	None	None	
Wendy (Mameng)	September 1 – 7	Tropical storm	65 km/h (40 mph)	990 hPa (29.23 inHg)	Philippines, China	$309 million	133	
York (Neneng)	September 9 – 17	Severe tropical storm	100 km/h (62 mph)	980 hPa (28.94 inHg)	Philippines, South China	$34 million	35	
Zia	September 11 – 15	Tropical storm	65 km/h (40 mph)	990 hPa (29.23 inHg)	Philippines, China	$18.5 million	9	
Ann	September 14 – 19	Severe tropical storm	95 km/h (59 mph)	985 hPa (29.09 inHg)	East China	None	None	
Bart (Oniang)	September 17 – 25	Very strong typhoon	165 km/h (103 mph)	930 hPa (27.46 inHg)	Japan	$1.43 billion	36	
TD	September 21	Tropical depression	Not specified	1008 hPa (29.77 inHg)	None	None	None	
Cam	September 22 – 26	Tropical storm	85 km/h (53 mph)	992 hPa (29.29 inHg)	South China	None	1	
Dan (Pepang)	October 2 – 10	Strong typhoon	150 km/h (93 mph)	955 hPa (28.20 inHg)	Philippines, Taiwan, China, South Korea	$242 million	44	
Eve (Rening)	October 15 – 20	Tropical storm	85 km/h (53 mph)	990 hPa (29.23 inHg)	Philippines, Vietnam	$237 million	622	
TD	October 23 – 24	Tropical depression	Not specified	1004 hPa (29.65 inHg)	Vietnam, Thailand	None	None	
TD	November 5	Tropical depression	Not specified	1002 hPa (29.59 inHg)	Vietnam	$488 million	595	
28W	November 5 – 8	Tropical depression	55 km/h (34 mph)	1000 hPa (29.53 inHg)	Mariana Islands	None	None	
Frankie (Sendang)	November 6 – 11	Tropical depression	55 km/h (34 mph)	994 hPa (29.35 inHg)	Philippines	None	None	
Gloria (Trining)	November 13 – 16	Severe tropical storm	95 km/h (59 mph)	980 hPa (28.94 inHg)	None	None	None	
31W	December 1 – 4	Tropical depression	55 km/h (34 mph)	1004 hPa (29.65 inHg)	Thailand	None	None	
32W	December 8 – 10	Tropical depression	55 km/h (34 mph)	1002 hPa (29.59 inHg)	None	None	None	
33W	December 14 – 16	Tropical depression	55 km/h (34 mph)	1000 hPa (29.53 inHg)	Vietnam	None	None	
Season aggregates
46 systems	January 3 – December 16, 1999		165 km/h (103 mph)	930 hPa (27.46 inHg)		$3.62 billion	1,798	

== See also ==
- 1999 Pacific hurricane season
- 1999 Atlantic hurricane season
- 1999–2000 Australian region cyclone season
- 1999–2000 South Pacific cyclone season
- 1999–2000 South-West Indian Ocean cyclone season
