= Architecture of the Philippines =

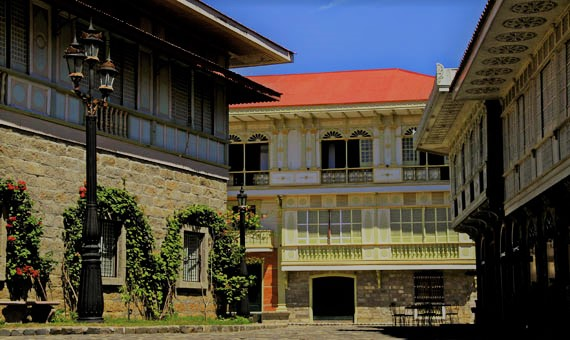
Bahay na bato ("house of stone") is a type of building originating during the Philippines' Spanish colonial period.

The architecture of the Philippines reflects the historical and cultural traditions in the country. Most prominent historic structures in the archipelago are influenced by Austronesian, Spanish, Chinese, and American architectures.

During three hundred thirty years of Spanish colonization, the Philippine architecture was dominated by the Spanish influences. The Augustinian friars, along with other religious orders, built many grand churches and cathedrals all over the Philippine Islands. During this period the traditional Filipino Bahay na bató (Filipino for "house of stone") style for the large houses emerged. These were large houses built of stone and wood combining Filipino, Spanish and Chinese style elements.

After the Philippines was ceded to the United States as a consequence of the Spanish–American War in 1898, the architecture of the Philippines was influenced by American aesthetics. In this period, the plan for the modern City of Manila was designed, with many neoclassical architecture and art deco buildings by famous American and Filipino architects. During World War II, large portions of Intramuros and Manila were destroyed; many heritage districts in the provinces were burned down by the Japanese before the end of the war. In the reconstruction period after the Second World War, many of the destroyed buildings were rebuilt, however, a majority of heritage structures, especially in the provinces, were lost and never rebuilt. Most of the structures that were lost are considered focal properties of former heritage towns.

In the late 20th century, modern architecture with straight lines and functional aspects was introduced, particularly in the Brutalist architecture that characterized government-built structures done in the Marcos period. During this period many of the older structures fell into decay due to the imposition of martial law. After the return of democracy in 1986, a new age of Philippine architecture came into focus through modernism. Early in the 21st century, a revival of the respect for the traditional Filipino elements in the architecture returned.

There have been proposals to establish a policy where each municipality and city will have an ordinance mandating all constructions and reconstructions within such territory to be inclined with the municipality or city's architecture and landscaping styles to preserve and conserve the country's dying heritage sites, which have been demolished one at a time in a fast pace due to urbanization, culturally-irresponsible development, and lack of towns-cape architectural vision.

The proposal advocates for the usage and reinterpretations of indigenous, colonial, and modern architectural and landscaping styles that are prevalent or used to be prevalent in a given city or municipality. The proposal aims to foster a renaissance in Philippine landscaping and townscaping, especially in rural areas which can easily be transformed into new architectural heritage towns within a 50-year time frame. Unfortunately, many Philippine-based architecture and engineering experts lack the sense of preserving heritage townscapes, such as the case in Manila, where business proposals to construct structures that are not inclined with Manila's architectural styles have been continuously accepted and constructed by such experts, effectively destroying Manila's architectural townscape one building at a time. Only the city of Vigan has an ordinance on architectural policy, which led to its declaration as a UNESCO World Heritage Site in 1999 and awarding of various recognition for the conservation and preservation of its unique architectural and landscaping styles.

To help establish a national architectural policy, bills to establish a Department of Culture were filed in the Senate and House of Representatives in 2016.

== Pre-Hispanic era ==
Varying Austronesian architecture existed all throughout Southeast Asia, including what would later become the Philippines. These varying styles exist within different Austronesian ethnic groups but what they have in common is the use of organic materials, thatch roofing, and often being raised by posts or stilts to avoid floods.

=== Civic works ===
==== Rice terraces ====
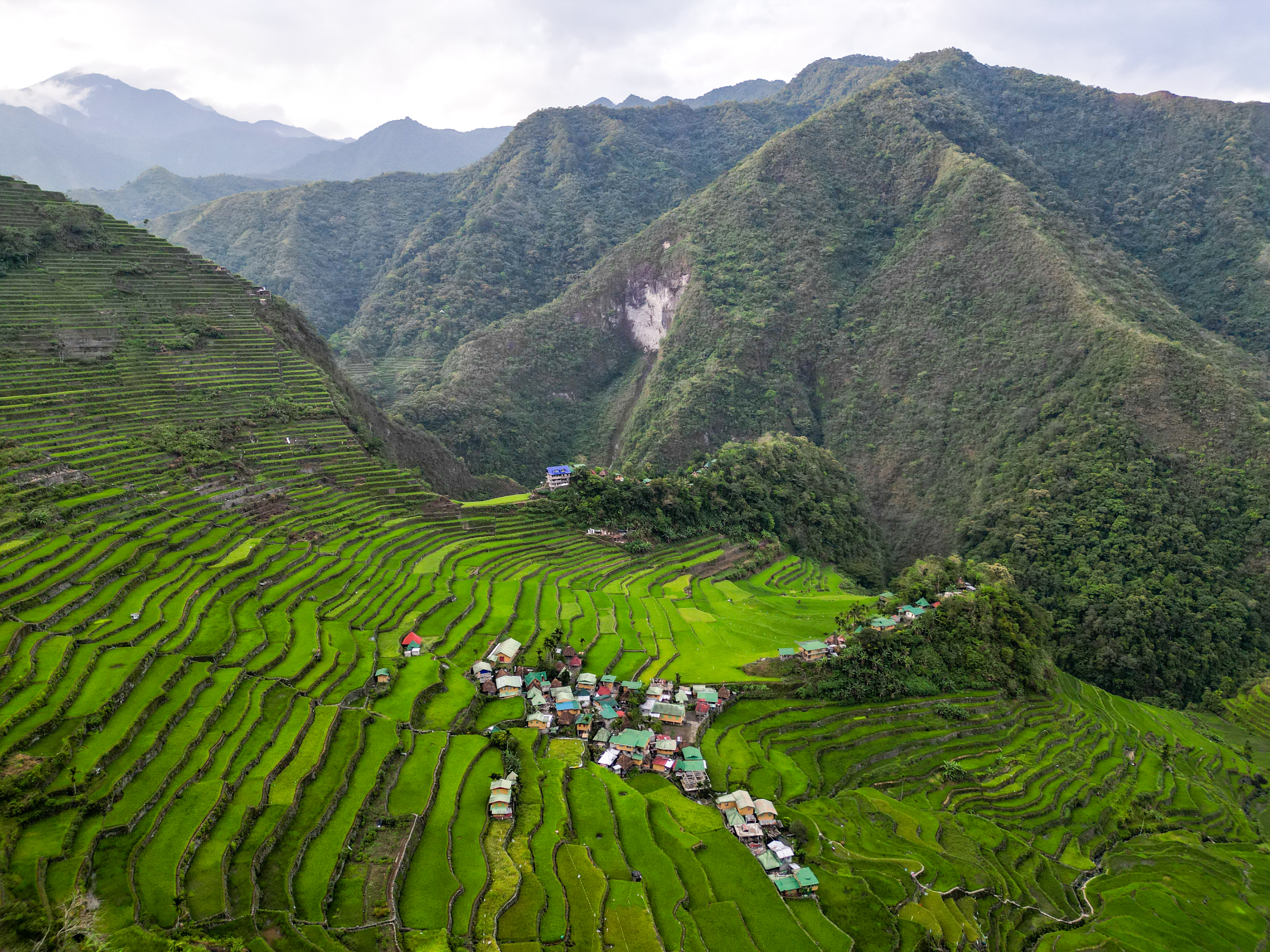
The Ifugao Rice Terraces, built about 2000 years ago, represents an illustration of an ancient civilization in the Philippines.

For years the mountainous province of Ifugao have been carefully cultivated with terraced fields. These rice terraces illustrate the ability of human culture to adapt to new social and climate pressures as well as to implement and develop new ideas and technologies. They also epitomize a harmonic, sustainable relationship between humans and their environment. The structures' original builders used stone and mud walls to carefully carve and construct terraces that could hold flooded pond fields for the cultivation of rice. They also established a system to water these plots by harvesting water from mountaintop forests. These engineering feats were done by hand as was the farming itself.

Maintenance of the rice terraces reflects a primarily cooperative approach of the whole community which is based on knowledge of the diversity of biological resources existing in the Ifugao agro-ecosystem, anannual system respecting lunar cycles, zoning and planning, soil conservation, and pest control based on the processing of a variety of herbs, accompanied by religious rituals and tribal culture.

Although popularly known as and listed by UNESCO as a World Heritage site believed to be older than 2,000 years, recent research suggests that the terraces may in fact be approximately 400 years old.

=== Palaces ===
==== Maranao torogan ====
The torogan (lit. 'resting place' or 'sleeping place') is the traditional palace of the Maranao royalty in Lanao, Mindanao. A torogan was a symbol of high social status. Such a residence was once a home to a sultan or datu in the Maranao community. Nowadays, concrete houses are found all over Maranao communities, but there remain torogans a hundred years old. The best-known are in Dayawan and Marawi. A torogan is elevated above the ground by columns cut from trees of huge girth. Its walls are covered with plywood sticks and the roof thatched with dried coconut leaves. There is no interior partition, so it appears as a huge hall. Apart from the basic elements of this structure, it is intricately engraved with flowing okir geometrical and foliage motifs. A torogan is not complete without the legendary bird sarimanok being displayed inside. Furniture is also common among Maranaws.

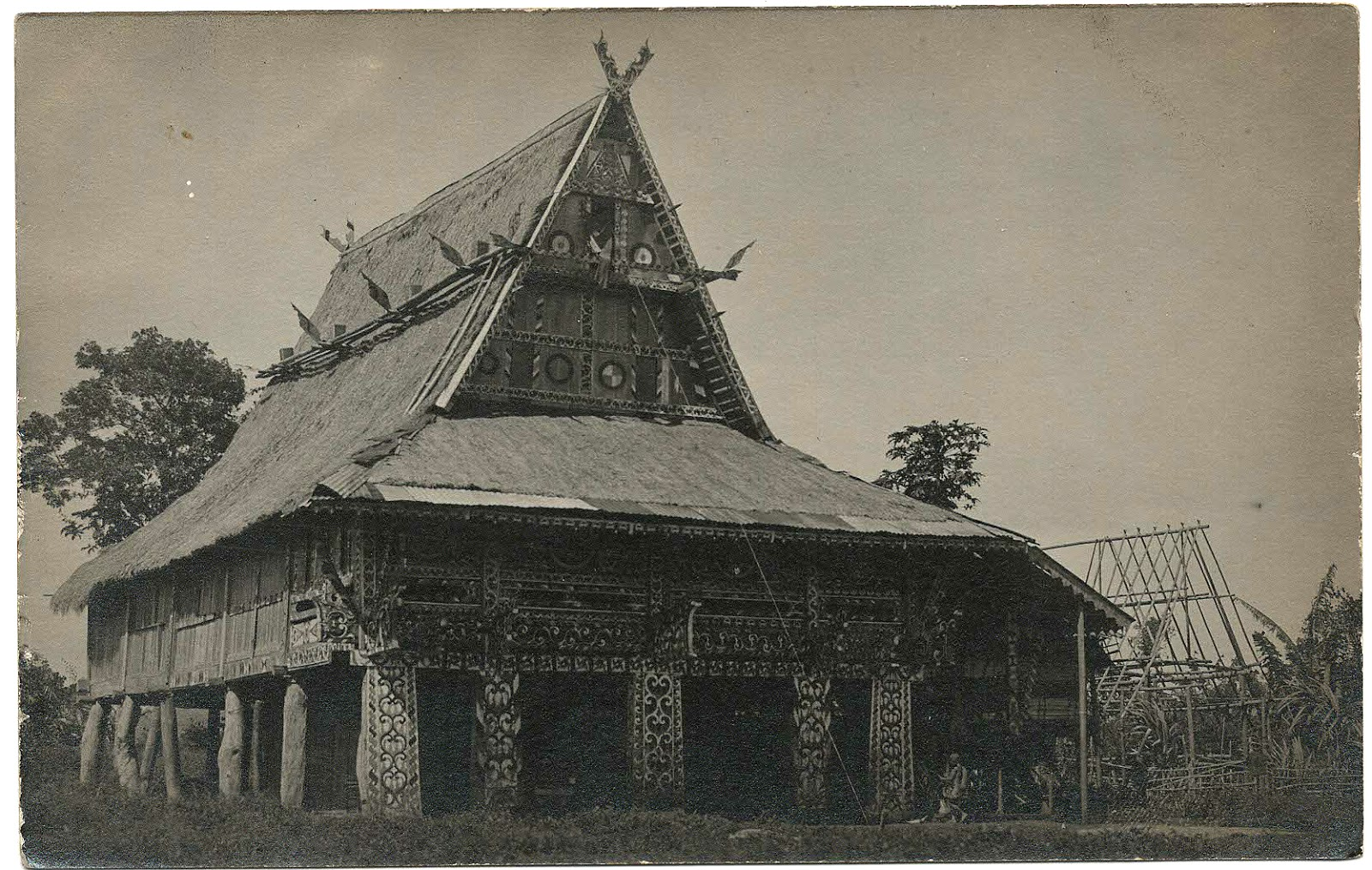
A torogan in Lanao del Sur, the traditional residences of community leaders among the Maranao people (c. 1908–1924)

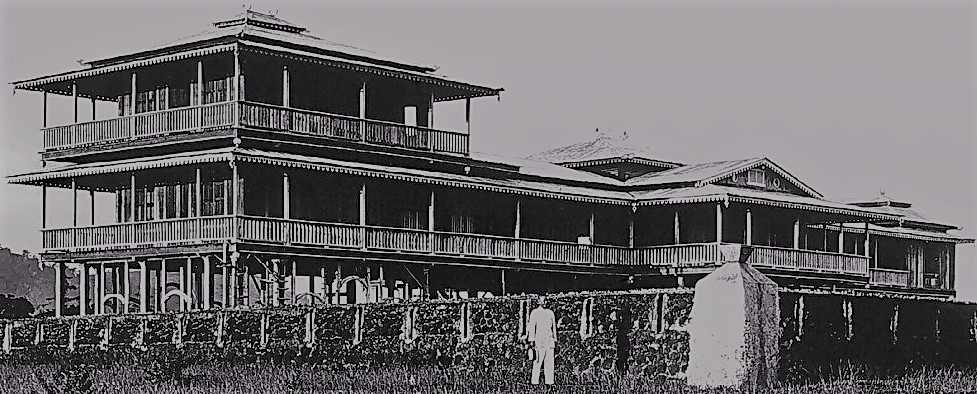
Daru Jambangan (Palace of Flowers), the royal residence of the ruler of the Tausug in Maimbung, Sulu

=== Villages ===
- The Kamhatik village is an excavated remains of a thousand-year-old barangay (a term used to connote a polity during the classical era) found in the jungles of Mount Maclayao in Sitio Kamhantik within the Buenavista Protected Landscape of Mulanay, Quezon, Philippines. It is widely believed that precolonial Tagalog people were responsible for the creation of the tombs. It is composed of fifteen limestone coffins that can be dated back from the period of 10th to 14th century based on one of National Museum's top archaeologist "a complex archaeological site with both habitation and burial remains from the period of approximately 10th to the 14th century ... the first of its kind in the Philippines having carved limestone tombs."
- The architecture of the classical period of the Philippines is based on vernacular architecture for most of its centuries in some coastal areas at the south, plus the interior of Lanao, after the 13th century.

=== Fortifications ===
The architecture of the early Filipinos are also reflected in the historical military structures in the country. There was often competition in trade between the thalassocratic states in the archipelago. Neighboring kingdoms would often wage wars against one another to gain control of trade and territory. Fortifications were then necessary to keep their subjects and interests protected. Due to foreign attacks and colonization, only a few of these fortresses physically remain. However, many cities in the country, such as Manila, were built on the basis of fortifications that predated the colony.

During the colonization of the Philippines, fortifications were also built by the foreign powers to assert political control in the islands. The Spanish, for example, made use of their forts against attacks from Chinese and Moro pirates, as well as the Dutch and the British. These forts were made almost entirely of stone; hence some of them have survived numerous wars and are still standing to this day.

==== Kuta ====
The surviving attested forms of fortifications in the country before colonization were the kuta (stronghold) and moog (tower). The word kuta is cognate with the Malay kota which has the modern meaning "city". In addition to its military uses, it also served as a palace for the local lord. These structures were usually made of stone and wood and were surrounded by trench networks.

Kuta were notably used by Muslims for defense against foreign invaders. It is said that the Maguindanao Sultanate, at the height of their power, blanketed the area around Western Mindanao with such fortifications to prevent the Spanish from advancing into the region. However, the sultanate was eventually subdued after further Spanish campaigns in the region and majority of the kuta were dismantled. During the American occupation, insurgents still built strongholds and the sultans often had these reinforced. Many of these forts were destroyed during American attacks, which is why very few have survived to this day.

Notable kuta:

- Kota Seludong: the foundation of the city of Manila
- Cainta was a fortified upriver polity which occupied both shores of an arm of the Pasig River. It was located not far from where the Pasig River meets Laguna de Bay, and is presumed to be the present site of the municipality of Cainta, Rizal
- Cotabato: "stone fort"; a stone fortification based in present-day Cotabato, Bangsamoro
- Kota Sug/Jolo: the capital and seat of the Sultanate of Sulu; converted into a walled city by the Spanish upon occupation in the 1870s

==== Igorot forts ====
The Igorot built forts made of stone walls that averaged several meters in width and about two to three times the width in height around 2000 BC.

==== Idjang ====
Fortifications for wartime purposes were also built by the Ivatan in the islands of Batanes. They built idjang which were a type of citadel on hills and elevated areas. These structures were designed so that the entrance was only accessible by the use of rope ladder which was only lowered for villagers to the disadvantage of the enemies.

=== Mosques ===
Prior to the usage of the common Islamic mosque architecture, which can also be seen in Arabia and modern architecture, the vernacular mosques of the Philippines used to be the hut-style and the pagoda-style, which were very common until the late 19th century. Most of the mosques in the Philippines today have common Islamic architectures imported from Arabia merged with modern style, though some vernacular pagoda-style mosques can still be seen in Mindanao such as the Masjid Datu Untong Balabaran of Taviran in Datu Odin Sinsuat, Maguindanao del Norte. There have been proposals to put the Heritage Mosques of the Philippines into the Philippine tentative list for UNESCO World Heritage Site declaration in the future. The proposals made were to input the historic mosques of the Philippines (mosque in Simunul), to input the vernacular mosques of the Philippines (langga/rangga-style and pagoda-style mosques), or to combine both and input them in the tentative list of UNESCO.

== Spanish era ==
The arrival of the Spaniards during the late Renaissance in 1571 brought in European colonial architecture to the Philippines, specifically what was popular at that time, which was the Renaissance architecture and what was emerging as Baroque architecture. Together with the local tradition of construction it created Christian lowland architectural traditions.

=== Bahay kubo ===
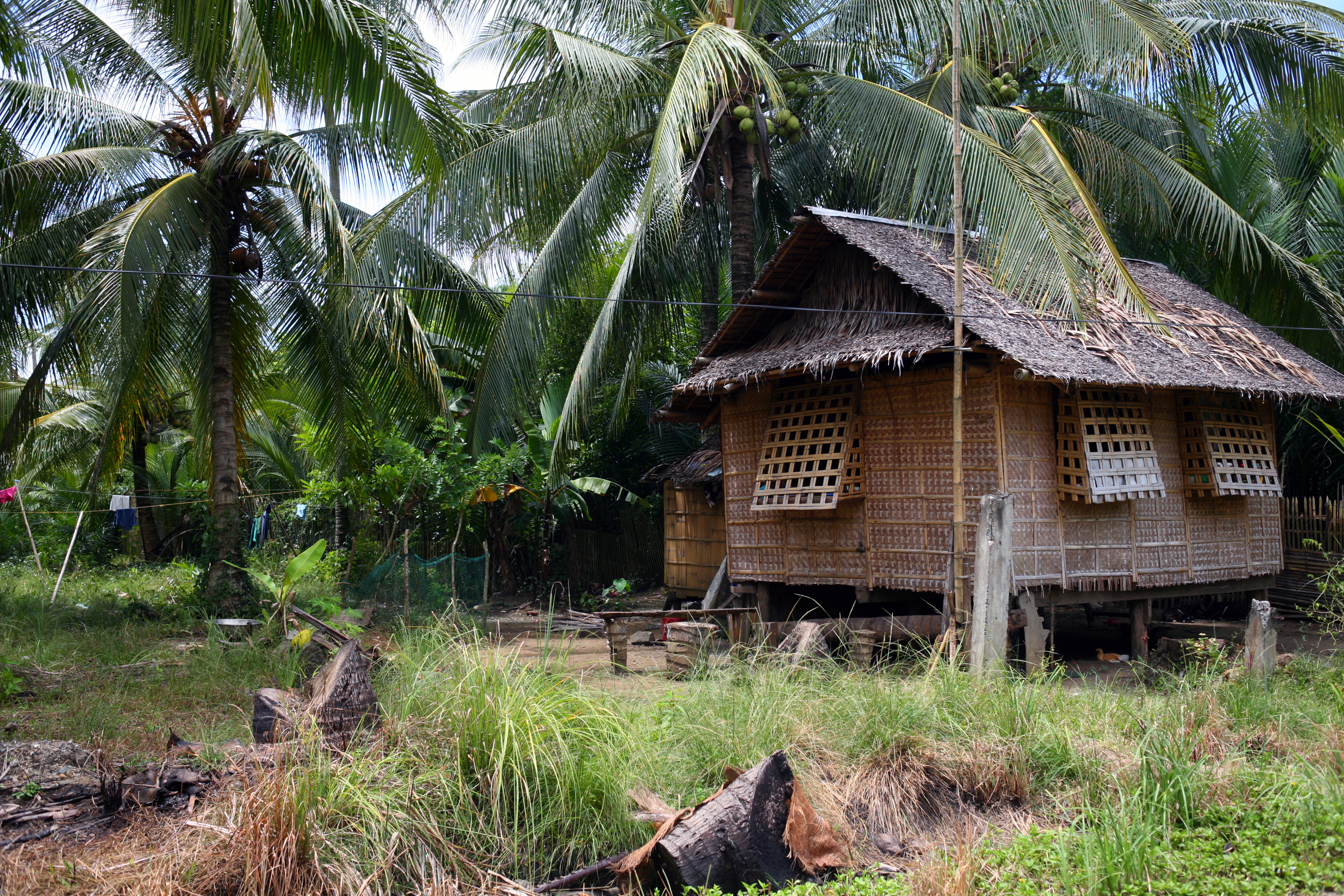
Bahay kubo, a type of stilt house indigenous to the Philippines especially in rural areas

Developed by the exchange of ideas within different ethnic groups of the Christian lowland Filipino population from ancestral knowledge originated from the prehispanic Austronesian architecture, it integrated with the new Christianized lifestyle of Spanish governance. Houses were built in a more or less similar manner, in the same way that the settlements were built beside rivers and streams. The houses were built near rice fields and coconut groves and orchards. The houses sit on posts raised above the ground. The rooms were small, and generally, with a single multipurpose room, having only the cooking space differentiated among the areas in the houses. There is a particular architectural piece called batalan that is often situated in the rear part of the house, and is utilized for domestic work like washing, bathing, water storage, etc. The houses were made of raw material like wood and bamboo. Tree houses or houses built on trunk of trees rooted to the grounds were seen as an advantageous position.

The doors of the houses were usually oriented to the direction where the sun rises and never faced towards the west, an architectural tradition which can be explained by the values and belief systems that early inhabitants of the land have.

Tools allowed for the fabrication of tent-like shelters and tree houses. These houses were characterized by rectangular structures elevated on stilt foundations and covered by voluminous thatched roofs ornamented with gable-finials and its structure could be lifted as a whole and carried to a new site.

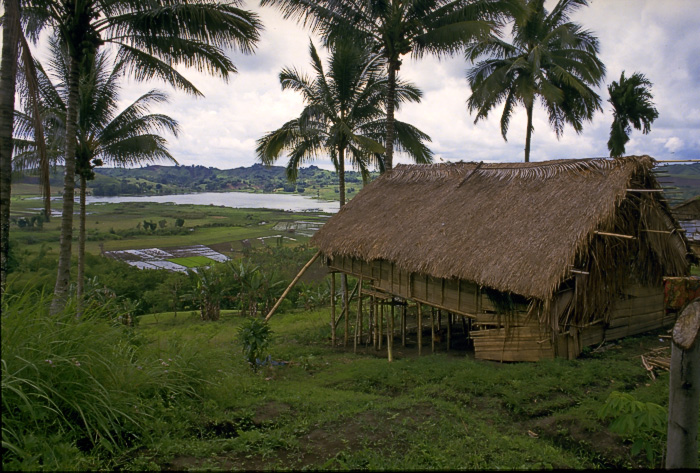
A Tboli nipa hut in Southern Philippines

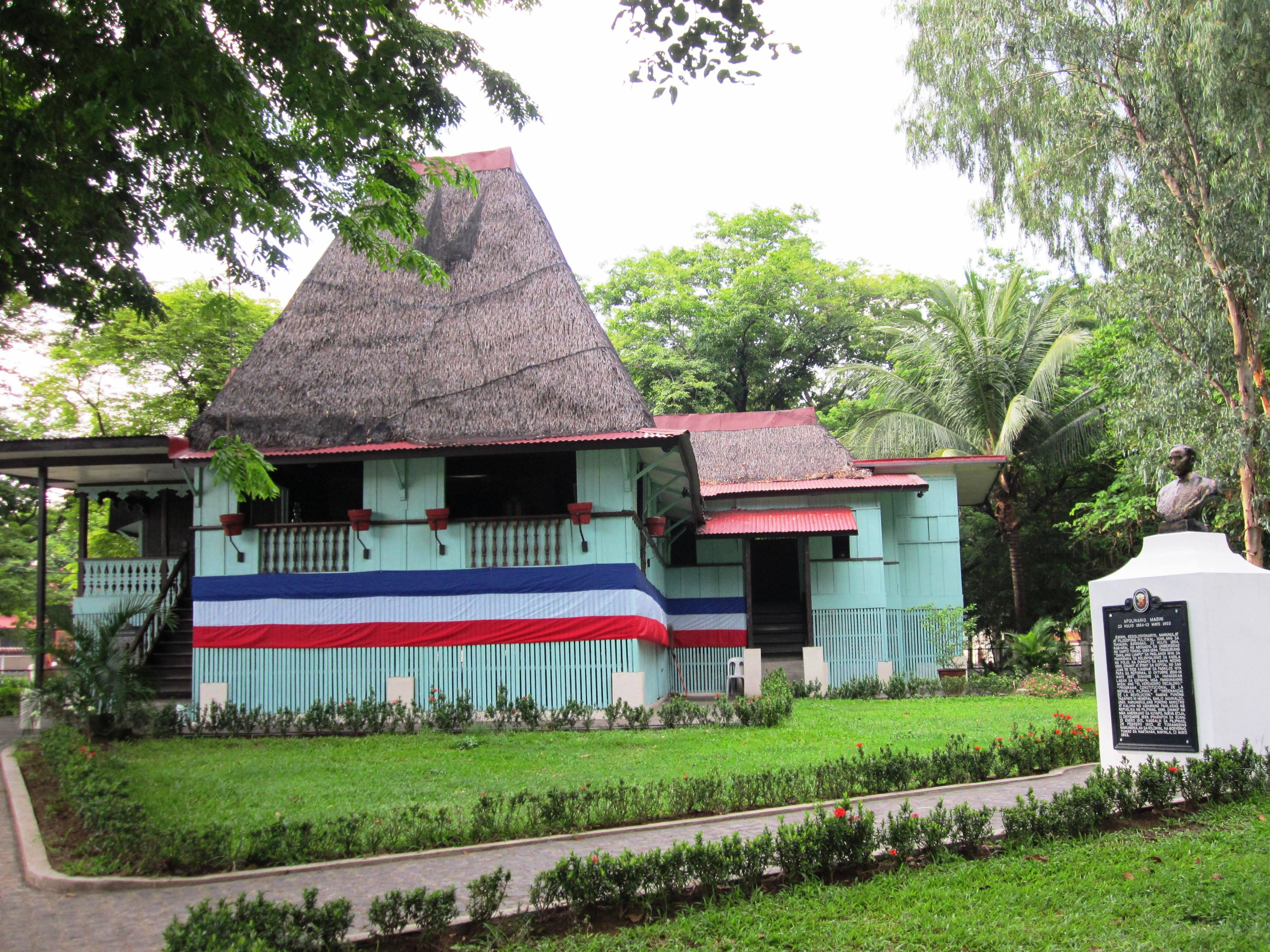
The Mabini Shrine in Manila

=== Bahay na bato ===
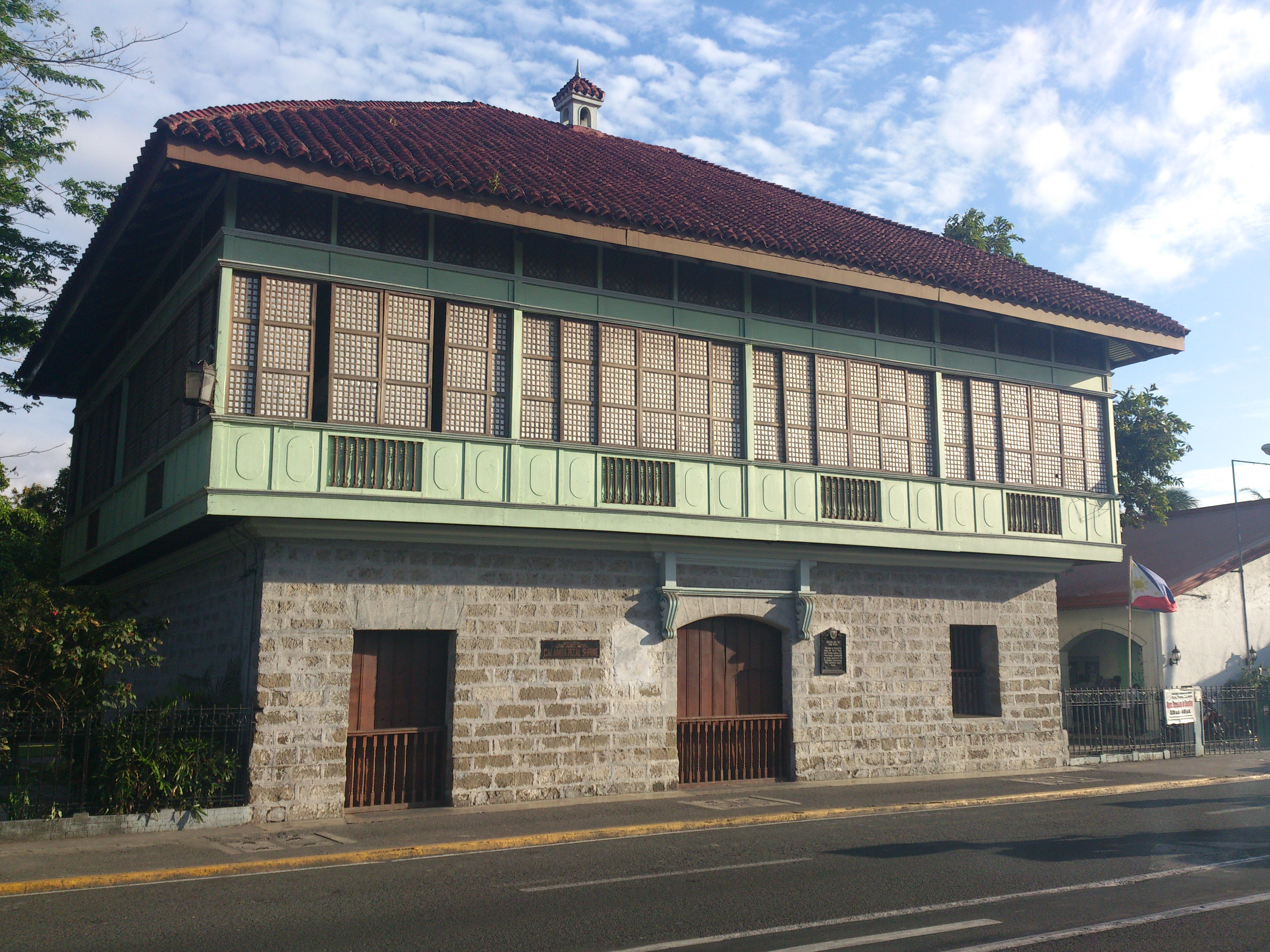
Bahay na Bato are Filipino colonial houses during the Spanish period. Pictured is the Rizal Shrine in Calamba, Laguna.

The arrival of the Spaniards in 1571 brought in European colonial architecture to the Philippines. Though not specifically suited for the hot tropics, European architecture was transposed via Acapulco, Mexico into a uniquely Filipino style.

In this era, the nipa hut or bahay kubo gave way to the bahay na bato (stone house) and became the typical house of noble Filipinos. The bahay na bato, the colonial Filipino house, followed the nipa hut's arrangements such as open ventilation and elevated apartments. The most obvious difference between the two houses would be the materials that was used to build them.

The bahay na bato was constructed out of brick and stone rather than the traditional bamboo, timber and other wooden materials that elevates the house. It is a mixture of native Filipino, Spanish and Chinese influences. During the 19th century, wealthy Filipinos built some fine houses, usually with solid stone foundations or brick lower walls, and overhanging, wooden upper story with balustrades and capiz-shell sliding window sashes, and a tiled roof. The dawn of the Victorian Era that heavily influenced Europe brought the Victorian architecture tradition to the Philippines a style known for its heavy eclecticism in architecture. The era also popularized Gothic Revival architecture and Art nouveau.

Neoclassical architecture emerged as a continuation of the unbroken Classical architecture tradition brought by the Spaniards, starting from the Renaissance and the Baroque, and was popularized from the 18th century. Excellent preserved examples of these houses of the illustrious Filipinos can be admired in Vigan, Ilocos Sur. Preserved examples of "bahay na bato" are also found in Cavite City, Taal, Batangas and Boac, Marinduque in southern Luzon, Iloilo, Iloilo and Carcar, Cebu in the Visayas, and Dapitan, Zamboanga del Norte.

All these styles of architectures adorned Filipino Bahay kubo, Bahay na bato, Tsalet, churches, mid-rise and high-rise apartments before World War II.

During World War II, many heritage districts and towns outside Metro Manila were heavily destroyed and damaged by American and Japanese bombs. Reports of deliberate burning of colonial structures by Japanese soldiers were also rampant. Most destroyed or damaged heritage structures have never been restored and now lay in ruins or have been replaced with shanty houses or concrete structures with no significant architectural aesthetics. Many scholars have championed for Japan and America's accountability for the destruction of many Filipino architectural landscapes and towns, but to no avail.

==== Intramuros Register of Styles and the Bahay na Bato ====
The Intramuros Register of Styles is the main architectural code of Intramuros, the historic core of the City of Manila, Philippines. The Register of Styles prescribes the Bahay na bato as the default style for new constructions in Intramuros. It explicitly recognized the Bahay na Bato as the dominant architectural typology of Intramuros during the Spanish colonial era until the destruction of the Walled City in 1945 during the Second World War.

The Register became part of Presidential Decree No. 1616, as amended, when it was gazetted by the Official Gazette of the Philippines on June 17, 2022. The Intramuros Administration is the agency of the Philippine Government responsible for the implementation of the Register of Styles.

Intramuros in Manila is the only locality in the Philippines where, for cultural reasons, the use, height, scale, and aesthetics of all new constructions and development are pre-determined and strictly regulated under the force of a national law. The Register of Styles, as an integral part of Presidential Decree No. 1616, is the main legal document prescribing and guiding the implementation of pre-war architectural colonial styles in Intramuros.

The Register of Styles is the first document to detail the historical styles of Intramuros. It was authored by Rancho Arcilla, who was then the Archivist of the Intramural Administration, and under the initiative of Guiller Asido, the former Administrator of Intramuros. Being an integral part of Presidential Decree No. 1616, the Register of Styles is the only architectural stylebook in the Philippines with the force and potency of a national law.

By form, the urban landscape of Intramuros mostly lacked setbacks, with buildings that were mostly terraced (rowhouses). Courtyards or backyards were exceptionally well adapted to the climate. By style Intramuros was described as both vernacular and cosmopolitan. While its Church and State buildings were European in orientation, albeit adapted and localized, most of the buildings enclaved within its walls embraced tropical vernacular constructions as exemplified by the Bahay na bato. Churches, fortifications, and palaces fashioned in European styles, though few, became icons and objects of popular imagination. In contrast, the vernacular Bahay na Bato, which was adopted in majority of buildings, prevailed in terms of number of constructions.

Pursuant to the Intramuros Register of Styles, new constructions in Intramuros that do not follow the Bahay na Bato typology may only be allowed only in specific locations where a Non-Bahay na Bato structure (e.g. a Neoclassical building) was known to exist. Otherwise, new constructions are required to follow the Bahay na Bato type.

=== Churches ===
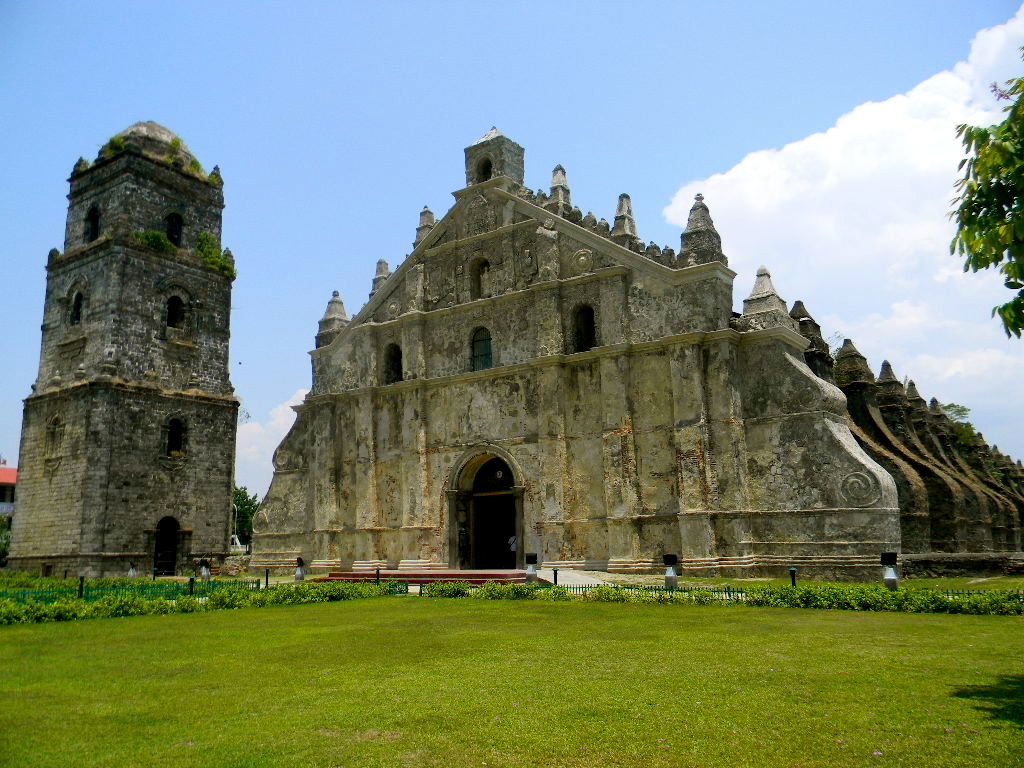
The Paoay Church is an example of Philippine earthquake baroque architecture.

The order of the Augustinians, Augustinian Province of the Most Holy Name of Jesus of the Philippines, built many churches all over the Philippines. The Paoay Church in Ilocos Norte is one of the most prominent types of these churches. This unique specimen of Filipino architecture called Filipino Baroque from the Spanish era has been included in the World Heritage Sites List of the UNESCO. The church was built by the Augustinian friars from 1694 until 1710. It shows the earthquake-proof baroque style architecture. The bell tower served as an observation post in 1896 for the Katipuneros during the Philippine revolution against the Spaniards, and again by the Filipino guerillas during the Japanese occupation in World War II. The present structure is the third to stand on the site and has survived seven major earthquakes, and the wars in Manila. The church remains under the care of the Augustinians who founded it. The church also houses the legacies of the Spanish conquistadors, Miguel López de Legazpi, Juan de Salcedo and Martín de Goiti who are buried and laid to rest in a tomb, underneath the church. Together with three other ancient churches in the country, it was designated as part of the World Heritage Site "Baroque Churches of the Philippines" in 1993.

=== Colonial fortifications ===
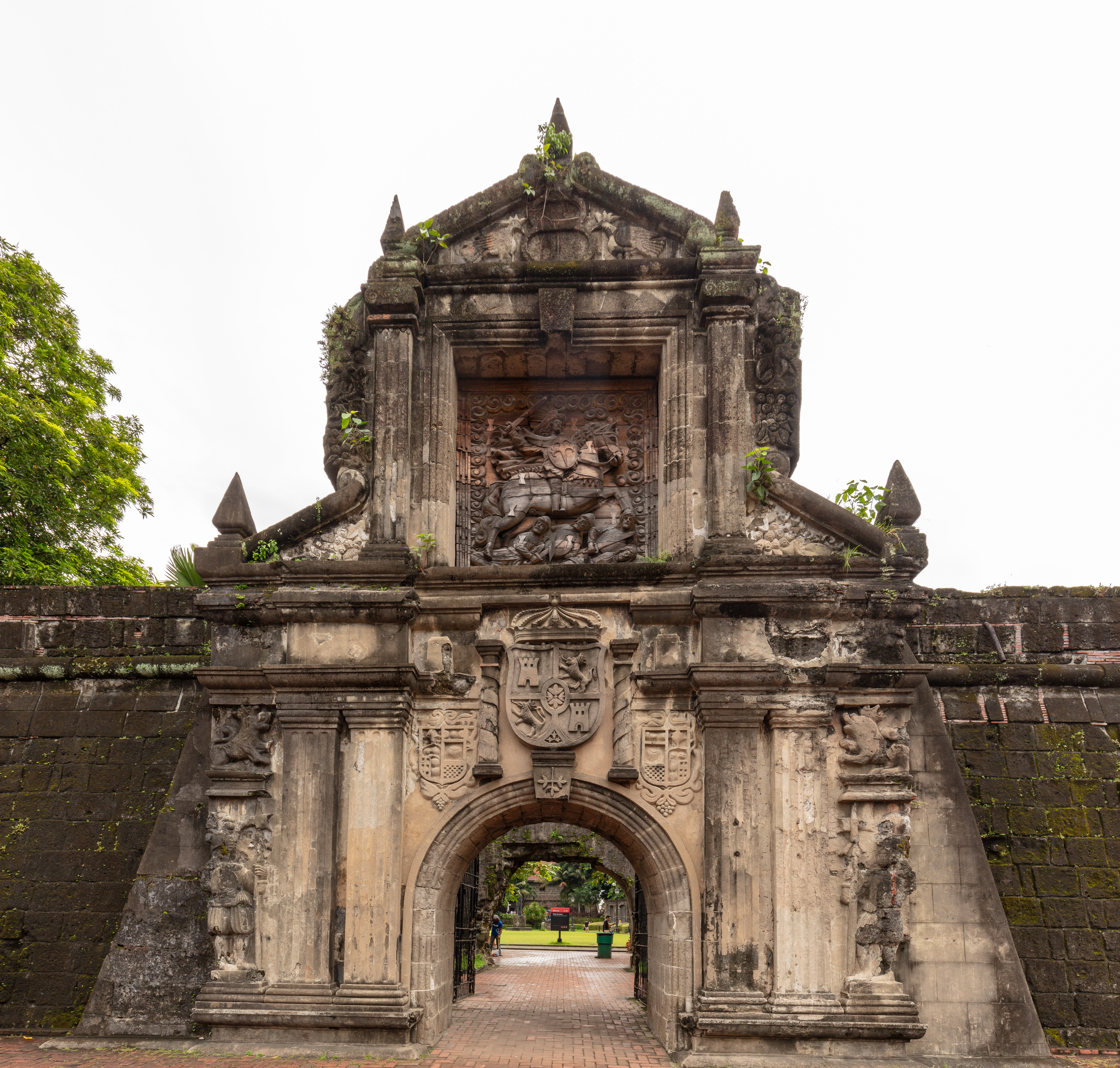
Fort Santiago in Intramuros, Manila

==== Fort Santiago ====
Fort Santiago (Fuerza de Santiago) is a defensive fortress established in 1571 by the Spanish conquistador Miguel López de Legazpi. It was the citadel of Intramuros, built on the site of the palace and of Rajah Sulayman. which was destroyed by the Spanish in 1570 while engaging in several battles with the Tagalog.

==== Intramuros ====
Intramuros was the walled city of Manila along the south bank of the Pasig River. It was established to replace Kota Seludong, the seat of the power of the Kingdom of Maynila that was protected by a rammed earth fortress equipped with stockades, battlements and cannons.

The historic city was once home to many colonial churches, schools, convents, government buildings and residences. Many of these products of Spanish architecture were destroyed during World War II. Of all the buildings within the 67-acre city, only one, the San Agustin Church, survived the war.

== American and Commonwealth period ==
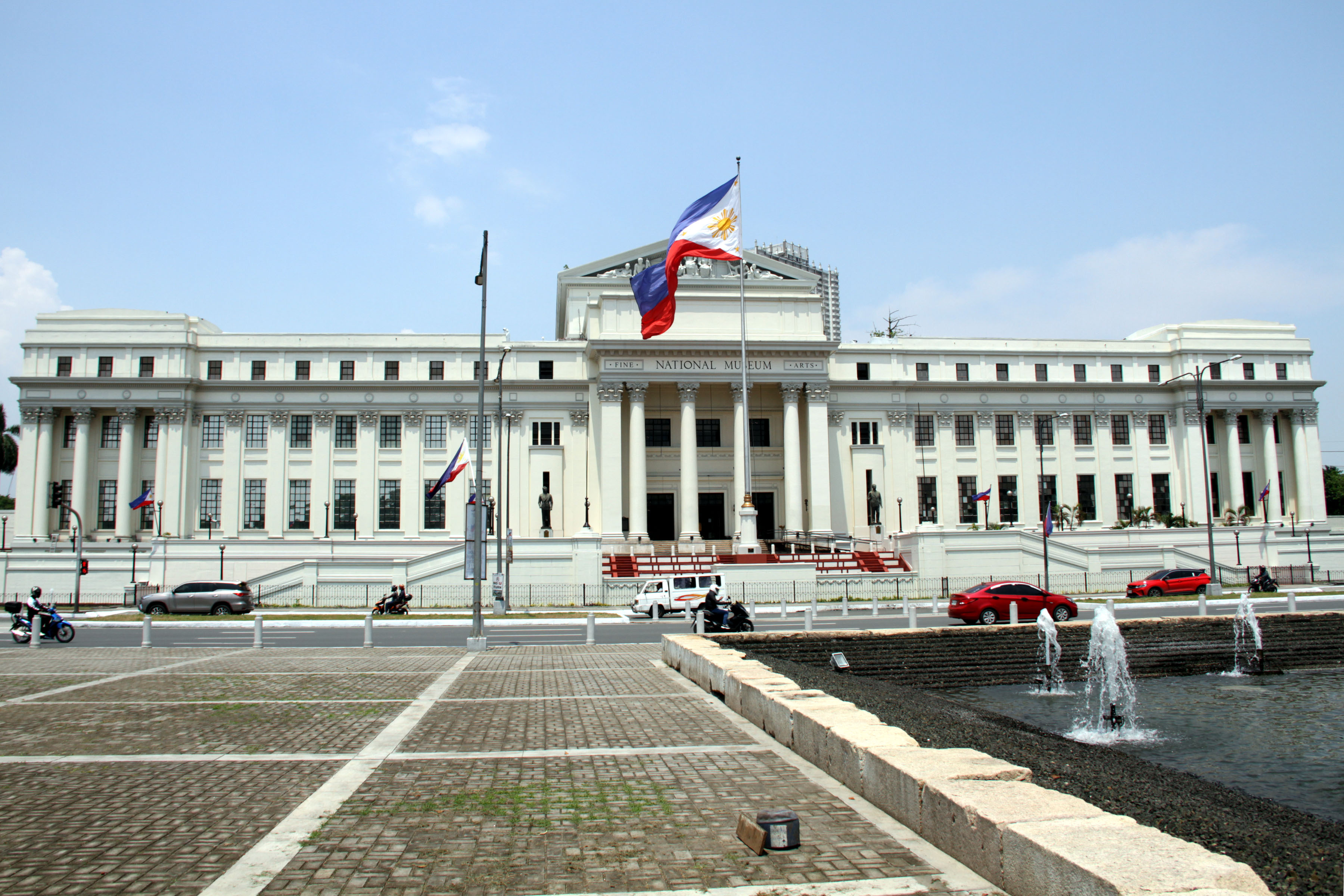
The National Museum of Fine Arts (Manila) is a Neoclassical building built during the American period.

With the arrival of the Americans in 1898 came a new breed of architectural structures in the Philippines. Foremost of the American contributions to the country was the establishment of civil government. This led to the erection of government buildings from the city all the way to the municipal level. The Americans continued the Neoclassical tradition in the Philippines through a much grander Beaux-Arts Architecture which was imported from the French and was very popular in America at that time. Designed in the most respectable manner, these government houses resembled Greek or Roman architecture. Classicism stopped being popular after World War II.

The revival period, popular at the turn of the century, became the foremost architectural parlance of the era as seen in such buildings particularly in Manila under the Philippine Commission. Education of the masses also became the thrust of the American occupation, as such, public education was established, foremost of which is the University of the Philippines. With American rule firmly established in the Philippines, the military government at the time invited the well-known architect and urban planner Daniel Burnham together with William Pierce Anderson (a Chicago architect) to develop Manila. Burnham's arrival led to the formation of the Burnham Plan which identifies the city of Manila as a uniquely European city in the tropics and as such opposed to develop its architecture in line with the existing style. The style of architecture, as suggested, varies little from existing architecture at the time as typified by the Manila Hotel. New structures continued the use of conventional motifs but were made of more durable materials such as concrete. This style of architecture prevailed even after the turn of the century.

The Luneta Hotel, located in Kalaw Avenue, is one of the remaining structures that survived the liberation of Manila in 1945. The hotel was completed in 1918. According to Dean Joseph Fernandez of the University of Santo Tomas, the hotel was designed by Salvador Farre, a Spanish architect and engineer. The structure is the only remaining example of the French Renaissance architecture with Filipino stylized Beaux-Arts architecture in the Philippines to date. Other notable American Architects in the Philippines was William E. Parsons (a consulting architect trained by Daniel Burnham) who is known for the Manila Hotel, The Mansion, Baguio and Gabaldon School Buildings, while applying the use of hollow blocks and termite-resistant Philippine Hardwood. Eventually succeeded by architect George Corner Fenhagen up until 1916. Some structures which have been constructed before World War II or during the occupation of Americans in the Philippines was the Insular Ice Plant designed by architect Edgar K. Bourne who also worked with Daniel Burnham. At the Far Eastern University (FEU) in Quiapo, Manila, five Art Deco structures on the campus were designed by National Artist Pablo Antonio. Three were built before World War II and two, after. Although FEU buildings were totally damaged during the war, the university was restored to its original Art Deco design immediately after. The university was given a UNESCO Asia Pacific-Heritage Award for Cultural Heritage in 2005 for the outstanding preservation of its Art Deco structures.

=== Art Deco buildings ===
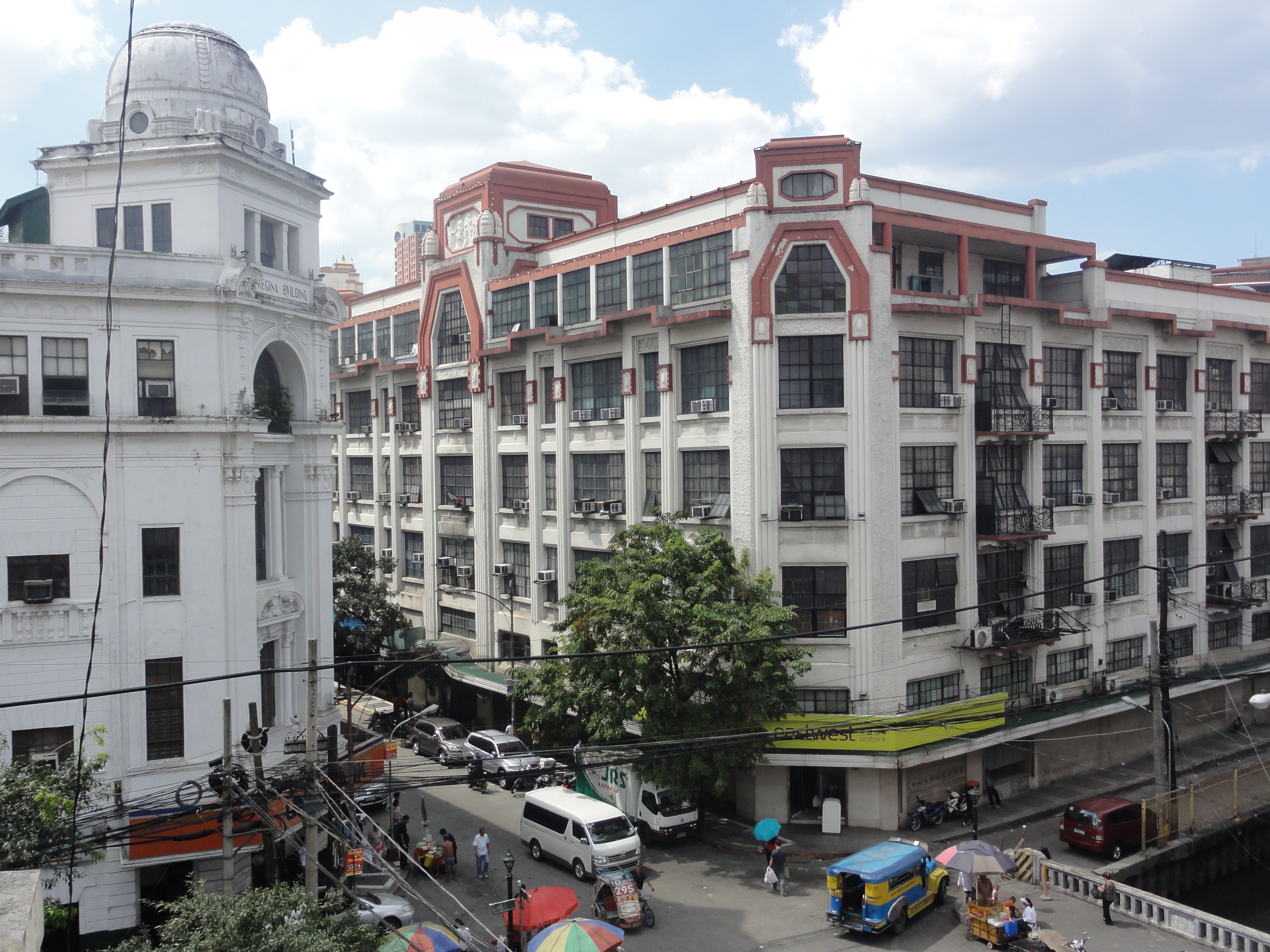
First United Building

During the rise of cinema in the Philippines as a form of recreation, several theaters were constructed in the 1930s to 1950s in the Art Deco style designed by prominent architects now recognized as National Artists. The Manila Metropolitan Theater is an Art Deco building designed by the Filipino architect Juan M. Arellano, and built in 1935. Another fine example of Art Deco is the Old Jaro Municipal Hall in Iloilo built in 1934 by Filipino architect Juan M. Arellano. It later became the Jaro District Police Station and after the full restoration is now the regional branch office of the National Museum. During the liberation of Manila by the combined American and Filipino troops in 1945, the theatre was totally destroyed. After reconstruction by the Americans it gradually fell into disuse in the 1960s. In the following decade it was meticulously restored but again fell into decay. The sculptures upon the façade of the theater are by Italian sculptor Francesco Riccardo Monti, who lived in Manila from 1930 until his death in 1958, and worked closely with Juan M. Arellano. Highly stylized relief carving of Philippine plants executed by the artist Isabelo Tampingco decorate the lobby walls and interior surfaces of the building. The Far Eastern University Manila campus is a living art museum with United Nations Educational, Scientific and Cultural Organisation-Asia Pacific Heritage buildings and auditorium done in the Art Deco style.

The following are the Philippine architects who contributed and led to the design of the classic Philippine theaters:

- Juan Nakpil, a Philippine national artist for architecture
- Pablo Antonio
- Juan M. Arellano

=== El Fraile Island ===
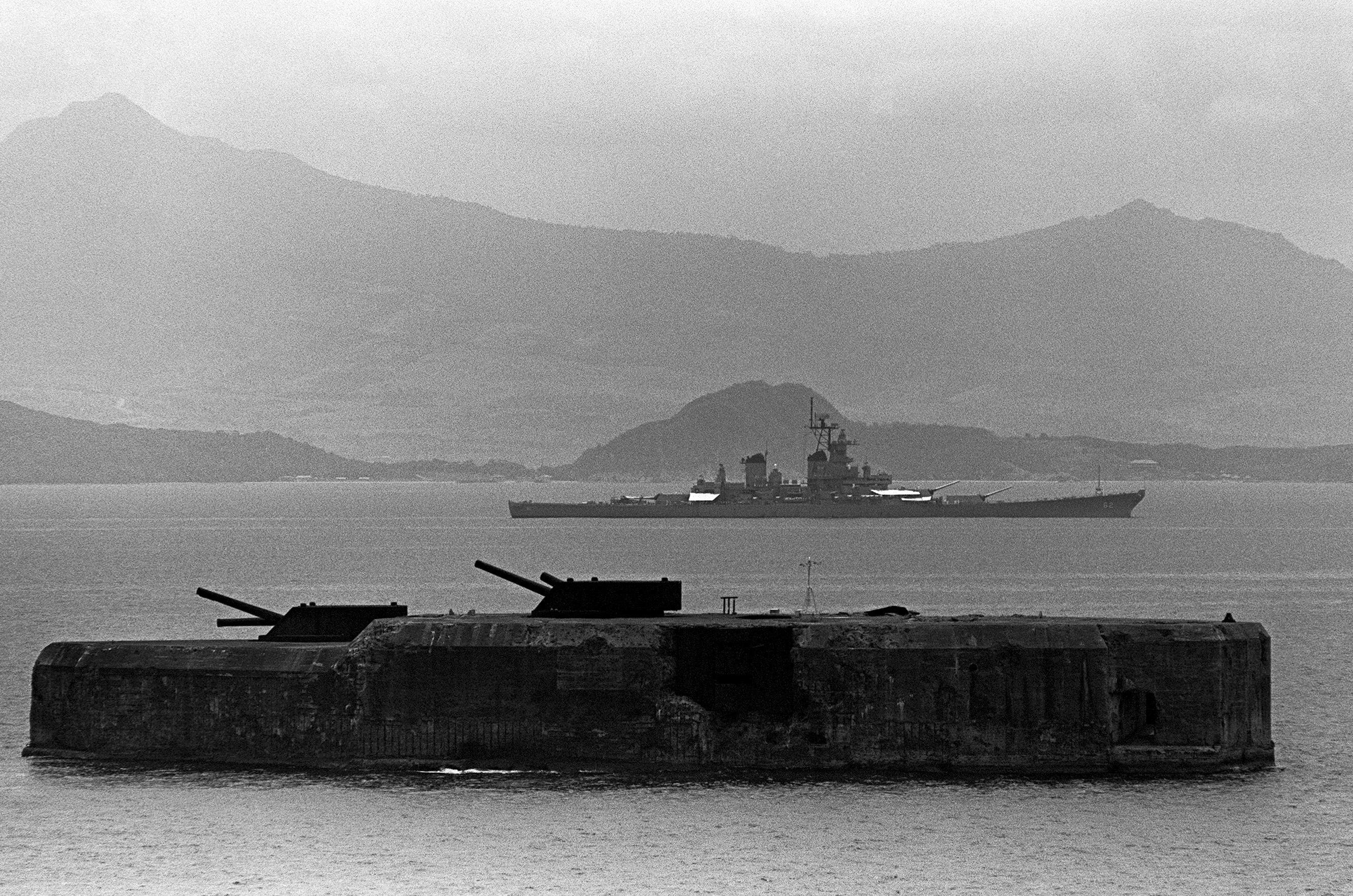
Fort Drum built by the Americans to guard the Islands nearby against invaders

El Fraile Island or Fort Drum, also known as "the concrete battleship," is a heavily fortified island situated at the mouth of Manila Bay in the Philippines, due south of Corregidor Island. The reinforced concrete fortress shaped like a battleship was built by the United States in 1909 as one of the harbor defenses at the wider South Channel entrance to the bay during the American colonial period. It was captured and occupied by the Japanese during World War II, and was recaptured by the U.S. after igniting petroleum and gasoline in the fort, leaving it permanently out of commission.

== Contemporary period ==
The aftermath of World War II brought major destruction especially in the capital city of Manila and a time of rebuilding ensued. The modern era dawned on Philippine architecture using the simple straight lines of the International Modern Style as a chief mode of expression. By the 1970s, a new form of Philippine architecture emerged with the filipinization of architecture. The Filipino style found its way in the re-emergence of traditional motifs, the bahay kubo and the bahay na bato became popular forms to be copied and modernized such as the Batasang Pambansa and the National Theater. By the 1980s the country's architectural idiom was swept by the tide of Post Modernism, a hearkening back of some sort to classical architecture. Today, architecture in the Philippines continues to be vibrant and with the country opening up to the world, more first rate architecture is pouring in.

=== Cultural Center of the Philippines Complex ===
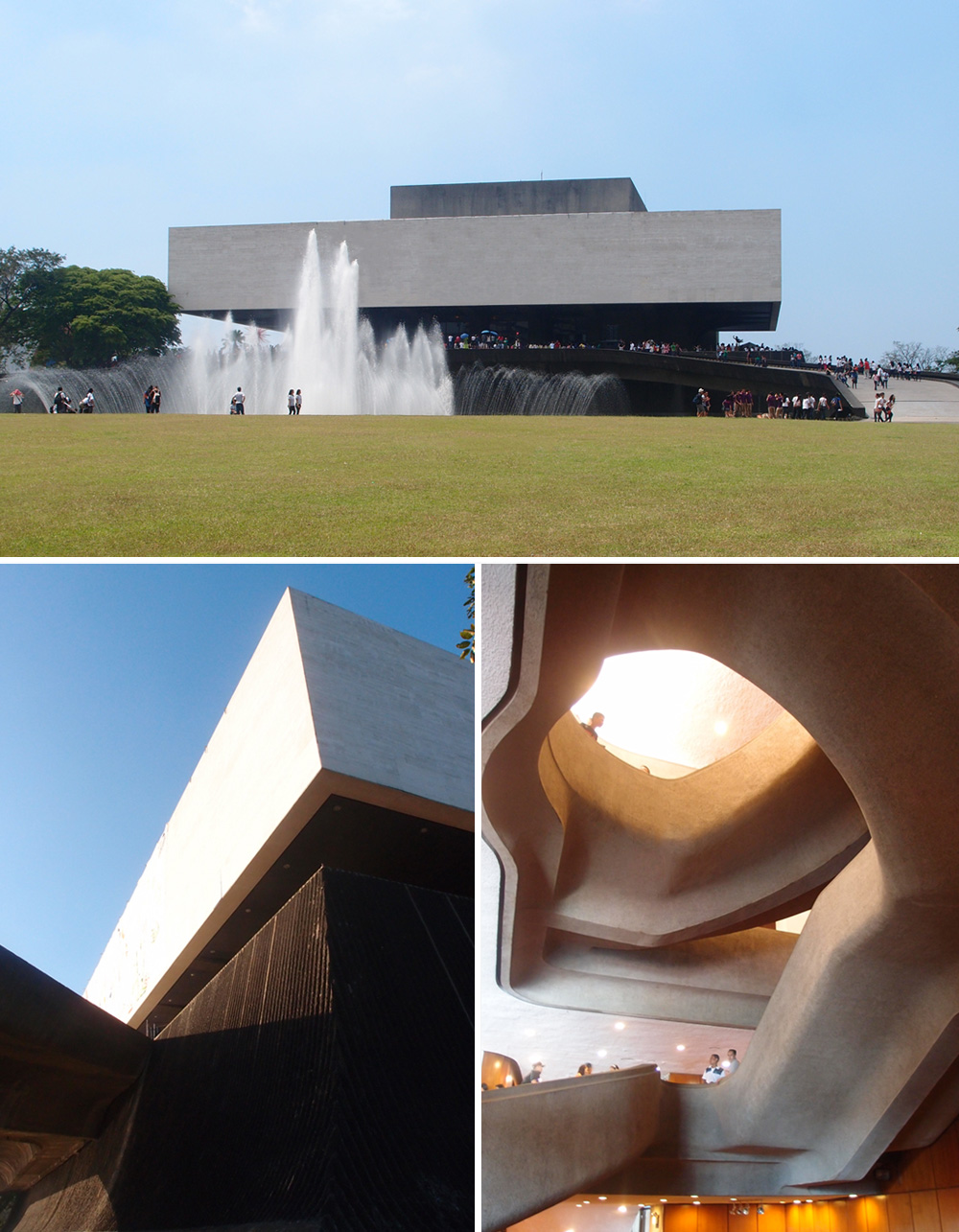
Cultural Center of the Philippines

The Cultural Center of the Philippines Complex is home to the National Theater (Tanghalang Pambansa). The theater is the centerpiece of the 77 hectare (190 acres) arts and culture complex located along Roxas Boulevard in Manila. Designed by Leandro V. Locsin, the construction of the National Theater began in 1966 and was completed in 1969. The theater is a primary example of the architect's signature style known as the floating volume, a trait can be seen in structures indigenous to the Philippines such as the nipa hut. It houses three performing arts venues, one theater for film screenings, galleries, a museum and the center's library and archives.

The façade of the National Theater is an example of Brutalist architecture. It is dominated by a two-storey travertine block suspended 12 meters (39 ft) high by deep concave cantilevers on three sides. The building is built on a massive podium, and entry is through a vehicular ramp in front of the raised lobby and a pedestrian side entry on its northwest side. In front of the National Theater and below the ramp, there is an octagonal reflecting pool with fountains and underwater lights. Aside from the National Theater, other structures located inside the CCP Complex is the Tanghalang Nicanor Abelardo or the Main Theater, Tanghalang Aurelio Tolentino or the Little Theater, Folks Art Theater and the Manila Film Center.

The Parish of the Holy Sacrifice is the landmark Catholic chapel in the University of the Philippines Diliman. Known for its architectural design, the church is recognized as a National Historical Landmark and a Cultural Treasure by the National Historical Institute and the National Museum respectively. Five National artists collaborated on the project. The building was designed by the late National Artist for Architecture, Leandro Locsin. Alfredo Juinio served as the structural engineer for the project. Around the chapel are fifteen large murals painted by Vicente Manansala depicting the Stations of the Cross. The marble altar and the large wooden cross above it were sculpted by Napoleon Abueva. The mosaic floor mural called the “River of Life” was designed by Arturo Luz.

=== Antipolo Church ===
The image of "Our Lady of Peace and Good Voyage" has been venerated in the church of Antipolo for centuries. The old church that housed the virgin was destroyed in February 1945 when the combined American and Filipino forces bombed Antipolo as part of the liberation campaign of Manila. In 1954, a new church was built designed by the renowned Filipino architect Jose de Ocampo. The Antipolo Church is of a cupolaed design centered around the image of the Virgin. It functions as the center point of the pilgrimages to Antipolo.

=== Iloilo Convention Center ===
The Iloilo Convention Center (also known as I-Con) is a state-of-the-art convention center in the Iloilo Business Park in Mandurriao, Iloilo City, Philippines. Its construction was completed in September 2015 in time for the APEC 2015 hosting. It is built on a 1.7-hectare of lot in the district of Mandurriao donated by the Megaworld Corporation. The Tourism Infrastructure and Enterprise Zone Authority (TIEZA) allocated P200 million for the construction of the convention center, while another P250 million was sourced from the Priority Development Assistance Fund of Senator Franklin Drilon.

The state-of-the-art convention center designed by Ilonggo architect, William Coscolluela. The design was inspired by Iloilo's Dinagyang and Paraw Regatta festivals. The paraw is a native double outrigger sailboat in the Visayas region, used in the annual Paraw Regatta Festival sailboat race. Abstract designs of the famous Dinagyang Festival are featured on the glass walls of the center. It is a two-storey structure with a total floor area of 11,832 square meters. The main hall on the ground floor has a 3,700-seat capacity and 500-seat function rooms on the second floor. A rooftop of 1,500 sqm is available for outdoor functions.

=== Cebu–Cordova Link Expressway ===
The Cebu–Cordova Link Expressway, also known as the Cebu–Cordova Bridge, is a toll bridge expressway in Metro Cebu which links Cebu City and Cordova, Cebu. It opened on April 27, 2022, to the public, becoming the longest bridge in the Philippines at 8.9 kilometers, surpassing the Candaba Viaduct in Luzon. The bridge was first proposed by Cordova mayor Adelino Sitoy, to connect his municipality and mainland Cebu in Cebu City. After numerous studies conducted, the local government units of Cordova and Cebu City entered into a public-private partnership with Metro Pacific Tollways Development Corp. (MPTDC).

== Vernacular styles by region ==
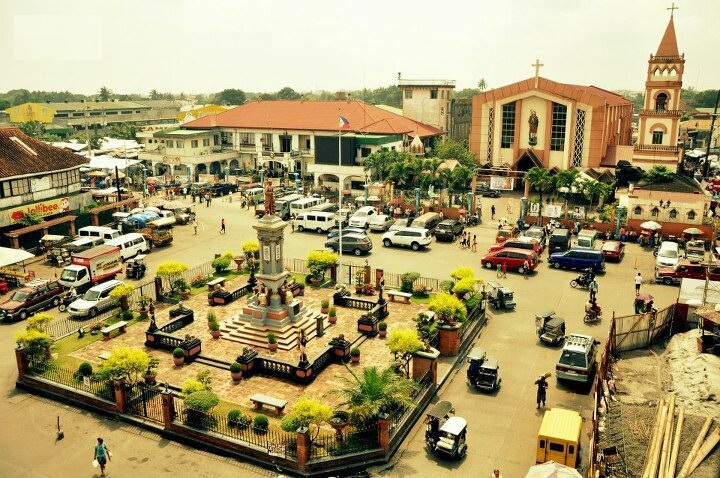
Plaza Rizal in Biñan, Laguna, showing a typical layout of a city or town poblacion

Lowland and coastal regions roughly divide into Christian and Muslim, and highland regions are largely indigenous.

Christian lowland architecture, encompassing a vast majority of the archipelago from northern Luzon to coastal Mindanao, have several ubiquitous characteristics: towns (colonial pueblos) follow a grid plan centered around a public square (plaza) accompanying a city hall (tribunal), church (simbahan, less common iglesia), convent, school, and other public facilities alongside concentrated clusters of large houses of the wealthy landowning elite (bahay na bato). Spanish colonial policies introduced private land ownership (tbe). Forts (fuerza or kuta) were commonly built especially among coastal towns to defend from seasonal raids of marauding fleets from Sulu and Maguindanao (generalized as moros) prevalent in most of the colonial period, and sometimes combined with the church which served as refuge. Many towns and cities, especially along bodies of water like rivers, lakes, and channels were built on preceding precolonial settlements - Manila and Tondo are famous examples.

=== Ivatan ===
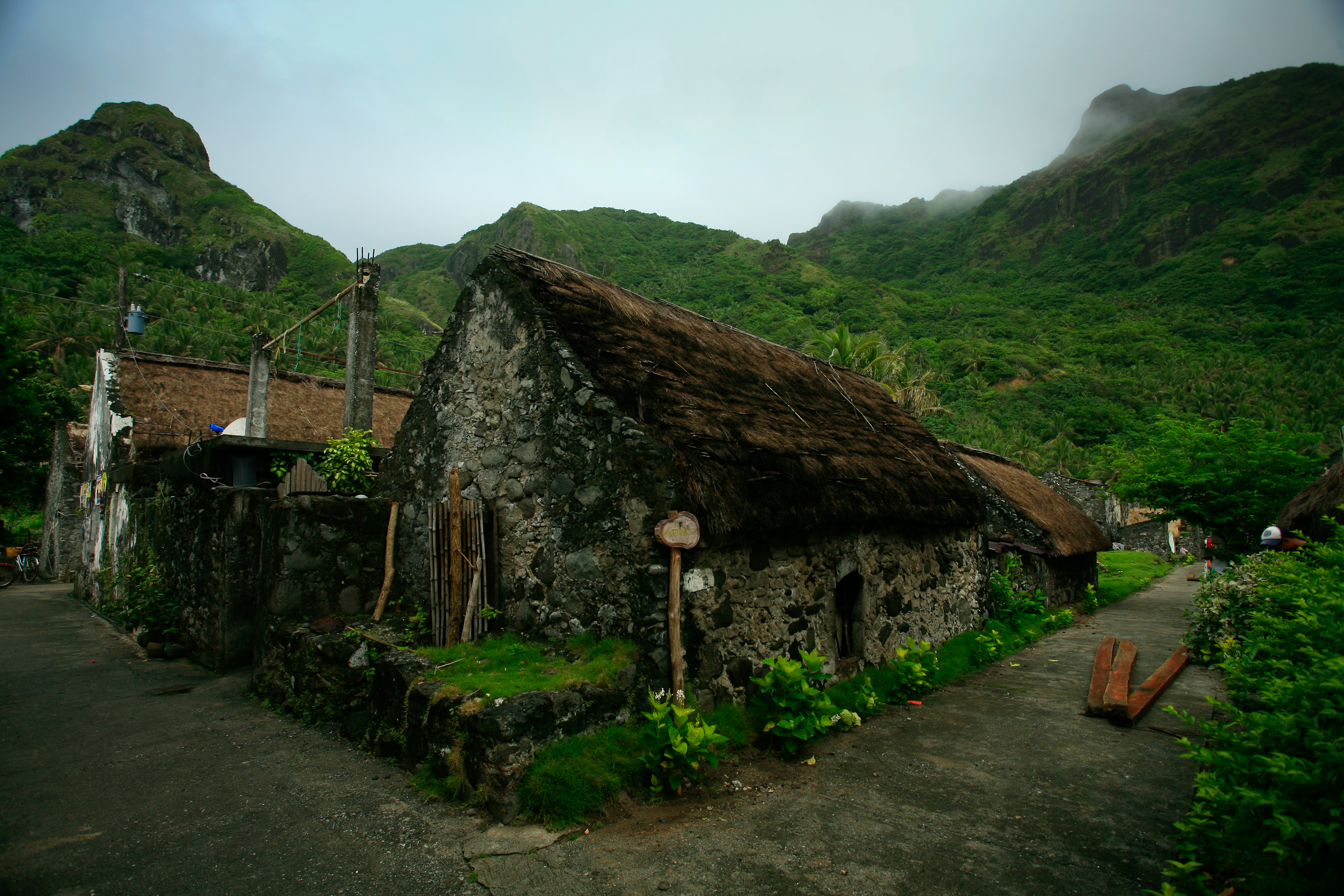
Sinadumparan in Sabtang

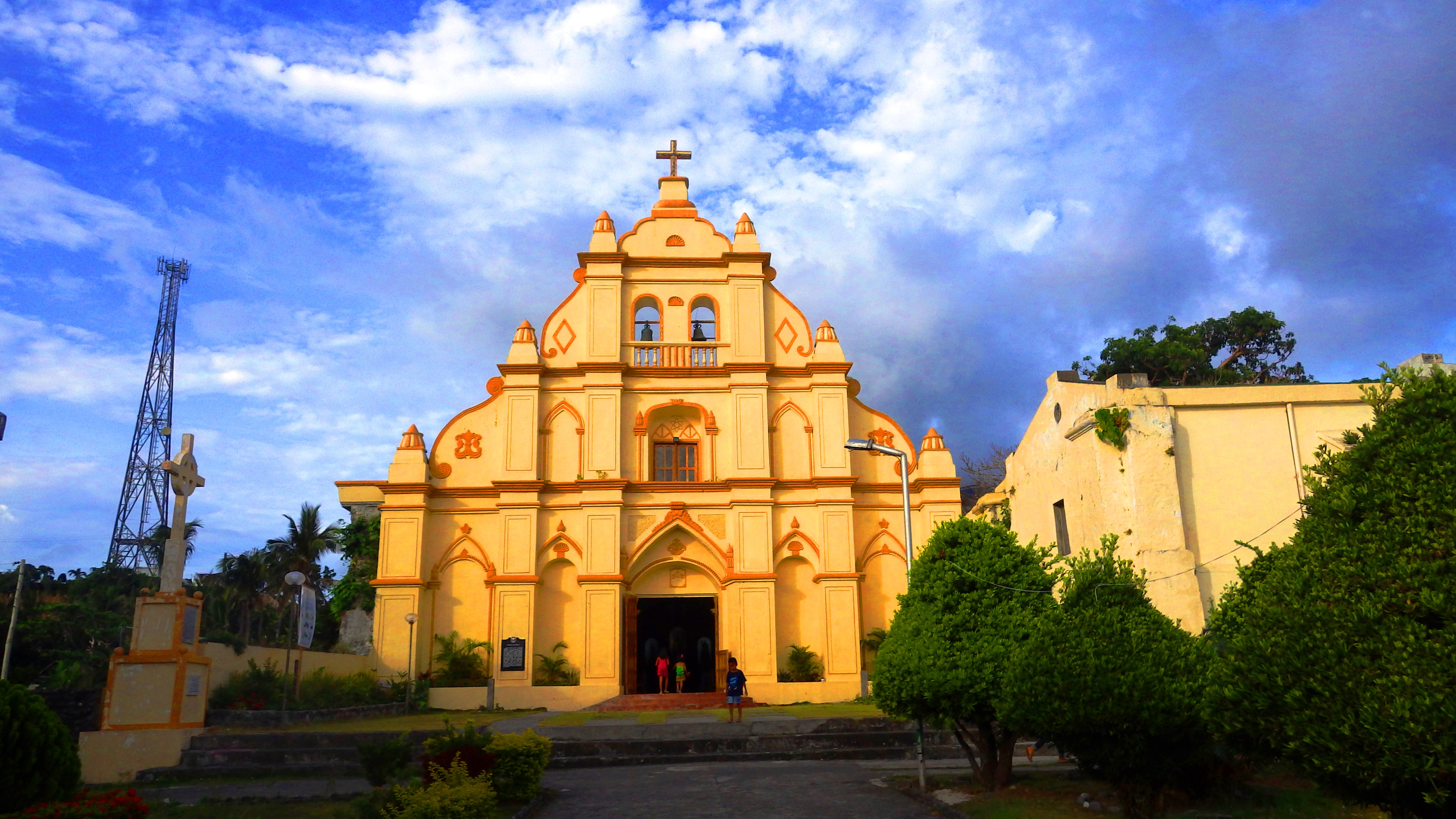
Basco Cathedral

Ivatan architecture is found in both the northernmost islands of Batanes and Babuyan, and a subset of its vernacular common house (sinadumparan) architecture are unique within the country for its predominantly stone structure - a protective, durable element from the particularly storm and earthquake-wrought landscape of the region.

Nonetheless, many other Ivatan houses and other structures are still built entirely of cogon like in precolonial times. Mayhurahed is the general term for such houses, though Itbayat particularly has niriñdiñ which uses sliding panels. Commonly used as temporary shelters are chivuvuhung, or jinjin for fishermen - they may become houses depending on availability of plank flooring. Rahaung are temporary, well-less shelters that serve either as open-air storage or other activity, while lagatiti are simple two-slope roofed lean-tos. Formerly, precolonial Ivatan society was clan-based and was divided by small, tightly knit settlements of cogon houses, and were protected by terraced citadels of stone and earth called ijang, typically on hilltops and ridges for defense during clan wars. The Spanish period introduced stonemasonry and imported large quantities of lime, ushering much of the stone architecture the region is known for today.

== Heritage towns and cities (1942–1945) ==
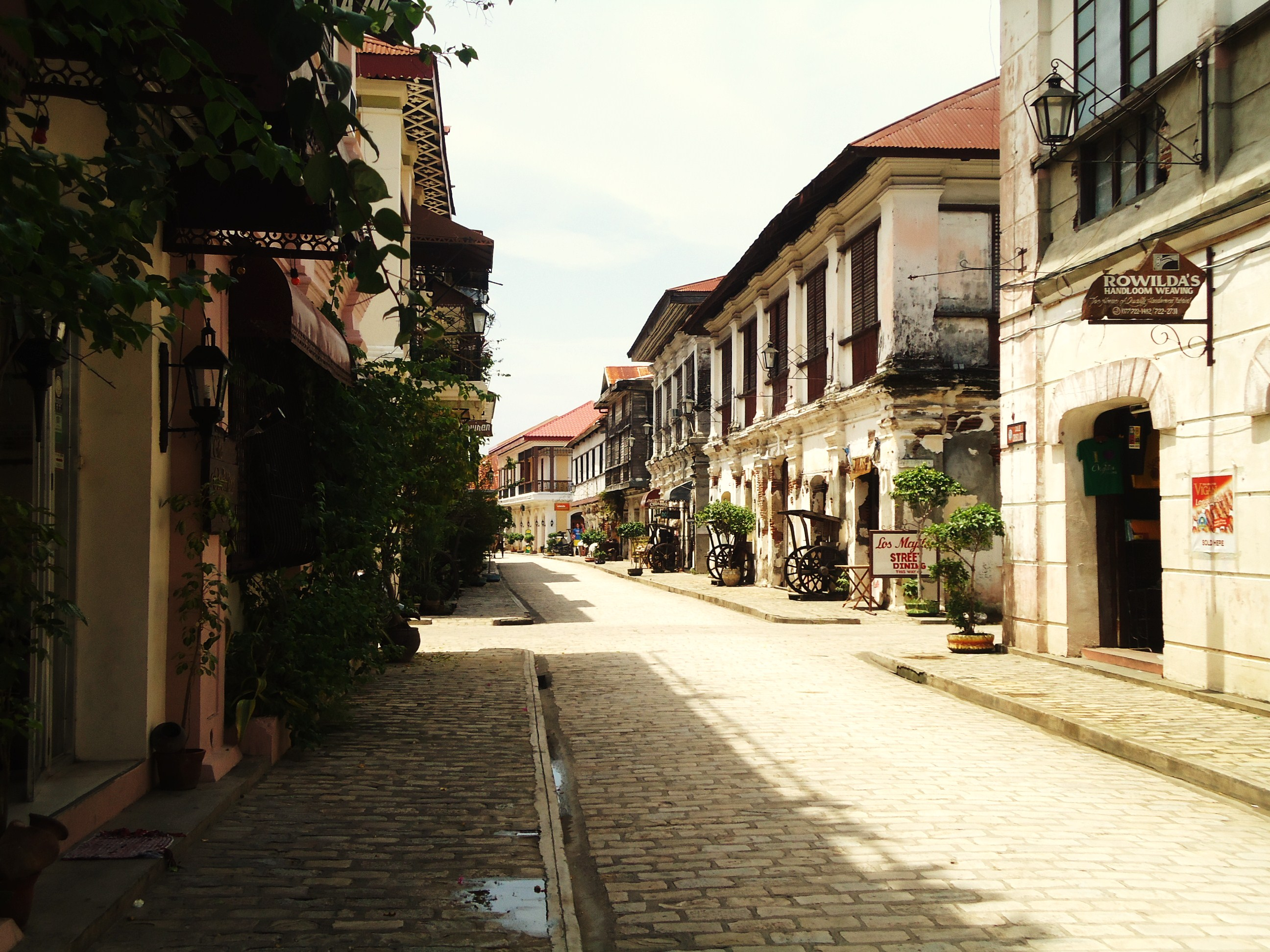
The heritage town of Vigan, one of the New 7 Wonders Cities

The Philippines is home to numerous heritage towns and cities, many of which have been intentionally destroyed by the Japanese through fire tactics in World War II and the Americans through bombings during the same war. After the war, the government of the Empire of Japan withheld from giving funds to the Philippines for the restoration of the heritage towns they destroyed, effectively destroying any chances of restoration, since the prewar Philippines' economy was devastated and had limited monetary supply. On the other hand, the United States gave minimal funding for only two of the hundreds of cities they destroyed, namely, Manila and Baguio. Today, only the centers (poblacion or downtown areas) of Filipino heritage towns and cities remain in most of the expansive heritage cities and towns in the country. Yet, some heritage cities in their former glory prior to the war still exist, such as the UNESCO city of Vigan which was the only heritage town saved from American bombing and Japanese fire and kamikaze tactics. The country currently lacks a city/town-singular architectural style law. Due to this, unaesthetic cement or shanty structures have taken over heritage buildings annually, destroying many former heritage townscapes. Some heritage buildings have been demolished or sold to corporations, and have been replaced by commercial structures such as shopping centers, condominium units, or newly furnished modern-style buildings, completely destroying the old aesthetics of many former heritage towns and cities. This is one of the reasons why UNESCO has repeatedly withheld from inscribing further Filipino heritage towns in the World Heritage List since 1999. Only the heritage city of Vigan has a town law that guarantees its singular architecture (the Vigan colonial style) shall always be used in constructions and reconstructions. Silay, Iloilo City, and San Fernando de Pampanga have ordinances giving certain tax exemptions to owners of heritage houses. In 2010, the Philippine Cultural Heritage Act passed into law, effectively giving protections to all cultural heritage properties of the Philippines. However, despite its passage, many ancestral home owners continue to approve the demolition of ancestral structures. In certain cases, government entities themselves were the purveyors of such demolitions.

Other notable heritage towns and cities include the UNESCO cities and towns of Manila, Banaue, Mayoyao, Hungduan, Kiangan, Baguio, Paoay, Santa Maria, and Santa Cruz, Miagao, Puerto Princesa, Tugaya, and Mati.

== Filipino National Artists for Architecture ==
- Leandro V. Locsin (1928–1994) was one of the modern architects who shaped the modern Filipino Architecture. During his career, he built five churches, over 30 different buildings, over 70 residences, and major landmarks in the Philippines including the Cultural Center of the Philippines.
- Juan F. Nakpil (May 26, 1899 – May 7, 1986) was a Filipino architect, teacher and a community leader. In 1973, he was named one of the National Artists for architecture. He was regarded as the Dean of Filipino Architects.
- Pablo Antonio (January 25, 1901 – June 14, 1975) was a Filipino architect. A pioneer of modern Philippine architecture, he was recognized in some quarters as the foremost Filipino modernist architect of his time.
- José María Zaragoza (December 6, 1912 – 1994) was a Filipino architect known for his European style during an era which used American architecture in the Philippines.
- Don Tomás Bautista Mapúa (December 21, 1888 – December 22, 1965) was a Filipino architect, educator and businessman. He is also the founder and 1st president of the Mapúa Institute of Technology, currently known as Mapúa University.

== United Architects of the Philippines ==
The United Architects of the Philippines formed in 1975 (officially known as the Integrated and Accredited Professional Organization of Architects) is the official architectural association of the Philippines. It is the first professional organization to be accredited by the Professional Regulation Commission, and it currently has 38,000 members.

== See also ==
- Culture of the Philippines
  - Cultural achievements of pre-colonial Philippines
  - Arts in the Philippines
- Spanish Colonial architecture
  - Spanish Baroque architecture
    - Baroque Churches of the Philippines
- List of mosques in the Philippines
- United Architects of the Philippines
- List of World Heritage Sites in the Philippines
- Colonial architecture of Southeast Asia
