= National Building Code of the Philippines =

Philippine building regulations established by Presidential Decree No. 1096

President of the Philippines
- Long title: Adopting a National Building Code of the Philippines Thereby Revising Republic Act Numbered Sixty-Five Hundred Forty-One
- Citation: Presidential Decree No. 1096
- Territorial extent: Philippines
- Enacted by: President of the Philippines
- Signed by: Ferdinand Marcos
- Signed: February 19, 1977
- Commenced: February 19, 1977

Related legislation
- Republic Act No. 6541; Batas Pambansa Blg. 344; Republic Act No. 9514; Republic Act No. 9266
- Status: Current legislation

The National Building Code of the Philippines, officially designated as Presidential Decree No. 1096 (PD 1096), is a building code that establishes minimum standards for the location, design, construction, alteration, use, occupancy, and maintenance of buildings and structures in the Philippines. It was issued by President Ferdinand Marcos on February 19, 1977, and revised the country's earlier building code, Republic Act No. 6541.

The code declares a state policy of safeguarding life, health, property, and public welfare through minimum requirements for buildings and structures, consistent with principles of environmental management. Its administration and enforcement are vested in the Department of Public Works and Highways (DPWH), while building officials implement its provisions within their respective jurisdictions.

== History ==
The first national building code in the Philippines was enacted through Republic Act No. 6541, which was approved on August 26, 1972. It was intended to establish uniform standards for the construction, alteration, repair, occupancy, and maintenance of buildings.

In the preamble to PD 1096, the government stated that Republic Act No. 6541 no longer adequately addressed the country's development goals, urbanisation, population growth, and technological requirements for buildings. PD 1096 consequently revised the earlier law and instituted a new national building code. The decree took effect upon its promulgation on February 19, 1977.

The DPWH promulgated substantially revised implementing rules and regulations in October 2004. The rules were published in April 2005 and took effect on May 1, 2005. They reorganised the implementing provisions to correspond with the chapters and sections of PD 1096 and incorporated more detailed development controls, permit procedures, technical requirements, and references to related laws and professional regulations.

== Scope and provisions ==
PD 1096 applies to the design, location, siting, construction, alteration, repair, conversion, use, occupancy, maintenance, moving, demolition, and addition to public and private buildings and structures. Traditional indigenous family dwellings, as defined by the code, are excluded from its general application.

Buildings constructed before the promulgation of PD 1096 are generally not affected unless they are altered, added to, converted, or repaired. In such cases, the code applies to the portions undergoing work.

The code is divided into 21 chapters. Its principal subjects include:

- administration, enforcement, administrative fines, and dangerous or ruinous buildings;
- building permits, inspections, and certificates of occupancy;
- types of construction and fire-resistive requirements;
- the classification of buildings according to use or occupancy;
- requirements for light, ventilation, and sanitation;
- projections over public streets and the protection of pedestrians during construction or demolition;
- structural design, foundations, exits, stairs, occupant loads, and other general construction requirements;
- electrical and mechanical installations;
- specialised requirements for photographic and X-ray films, prefabricated construction, plastics, spray booths, glass, and glazing;
- documentation of computer programs used for building design; and
- the construction and installation of signs.

The code also authorises the DPWH secretary to adopt and revise technical standards and to incorporate applicable referral codes. These supplementary requirements include regulations and standards concerning structural, electrical, mechanical, sanitary, plumbing, accessibility, and fire-safety matters.

== Permits and occupancy ==
Section 301 requires persons, corporations, and government agencies or instrumentalities to obtain a building permit before erecting, constructing, altering, repairing, moving, converting, or demolishing a building or structure. Permit applications are processed by the building official and technical personnel with reference to zoning, land use, structural design, sanitation, sewerage, environmental health, and electrical and mechanical safety requirements.

Approved plans may not be materially changed without the consent of the building official. A building permit expires when the authorised work is not commenced within one year after its issuance or when work is suspended or abandoned for 120 days.

A completed building may not be used or occupied, nor may its occupancy classification be changed, until the building official has issued a certificate of occupancy following final inspection. The certificate must be displayed conspicuously on the premises.

== Administration and enforcement ==
The DPWH secretary has overall responsibility for administering the code, issuing implementing regulations, and acting on appeals from the decisions of building officials. The National Building Code Development Office serves as the DPWH's technical staff for matters involving the code and its implementing rules.

Building officials are responsible for field enforcement. They may inspect construction work, issue or withhold permits, stop work that violates the code, and discontinue the use or occupancy of a noncompliant structure. Their decisions on the non-issuance, suspension, or revocation of permits may be appealed to the DPWH secretary, whose decision is subject to review by the Office of the President.

Buildings that are structurally unsafe, lack safe means of egress, present a fire hazard, or otherwise endanger life, health, or public welfare may be declared dangerous or ruinous. Depending on the degree of danger, the building official may order their repair, vacation, or demolition.

Violations may result in administrative fines, criminal penalties, stop-work orders, permit suspension or revocation, and the abatement of dangerous structures. The statutory penalties stated in PD 1096 include a fine of up to ₱20,000 or imprisonment of up to two years, or both, upon conviction.

== Judicial interpretation ==
In Philippine Economic Zone Authority v. Carantes (2010), the Supreme Court of the Philippines held that the Philippine Economic Zone Authority was responsible for administering and enforcing PD 1096 within areas owned and administered by the authority, rather than the local building official.

In Angeles University Foundation v. City of Angeles (2012), the court ruled that building-permit fees are regulatory charges rather than taxes on property. It consequently held that the university's statutory tax exemption did not exempt it from paying building-permit and related fees.

In consolidated cases decided in 2023, the court upheld the validity of Sections 302(3) and 302(4) of the revised implementing rules. It ruled that only registered and licensed architects may prepare, sign, and seal architectural documents covered by those provisions, while the preparation of civil or structural documents remains subject to the applicable professional laws.

== Modernisation efforts ==
The age of PD 1096 and the pace of changes in engineering, construction technology, disaster resilience, environmental design, and urban development have led to repeated proposals for its replacement. In 2023, the House of Representatives approved House Bill No. 8500, the proposed Philippine Building Act, on third reading, but the measure did not become law.

Another proposed Philippine Building Act, Senate Bill No. 666, was filed in 2025. The proposal sought to replace PD 1096 and introduce updated requirements concerning disaster resilience, sustainability, fire safety, building classification, inspection, and enforcement.

In April 2026, the DPWH reconstituted the National Building Code Review Committee through Special Order No. 155. The committee was instructed to examine concerns raised by professional and technical organisations and to recommend changes addressing evolving construction practices, urbanisation, climate risks, and contemporary safety and engineering standards. The review also prompted proposals to treat digital and telecommunications infrastructure as an integral part of modern building design.

== See also ==
- Building code
- Department of Public Works and Highways
- Fire Code of the Philippines
- Accessibility law
- Construction industry of the Philippines
- Architecture of the Philippines
