= Mount Maclayao =

Mountain in Quezon, Philippines

- Location within Luzon Location within Philippines

Highest point
- Elevation: 1,260 m (4,130 ft)
- Coordinates: 13°31′30″N 122°26′17″E

Mount Maclayao a mountain in the Philippines. It is located in Mulanay, Quezon, in the Calabarzon region, north-west of the country, 200 km south-east of the national capital Manila, within the Bondoc Peninsula. It is the main mountain of the Buenavista Protected Landscape.
