= Limestone tombs of Kamhantik =

Archaeological site in Quezon, Philippines

Limestone tombs complex of Kamhantik
- Puntod ng Kamhantik (Filipino)
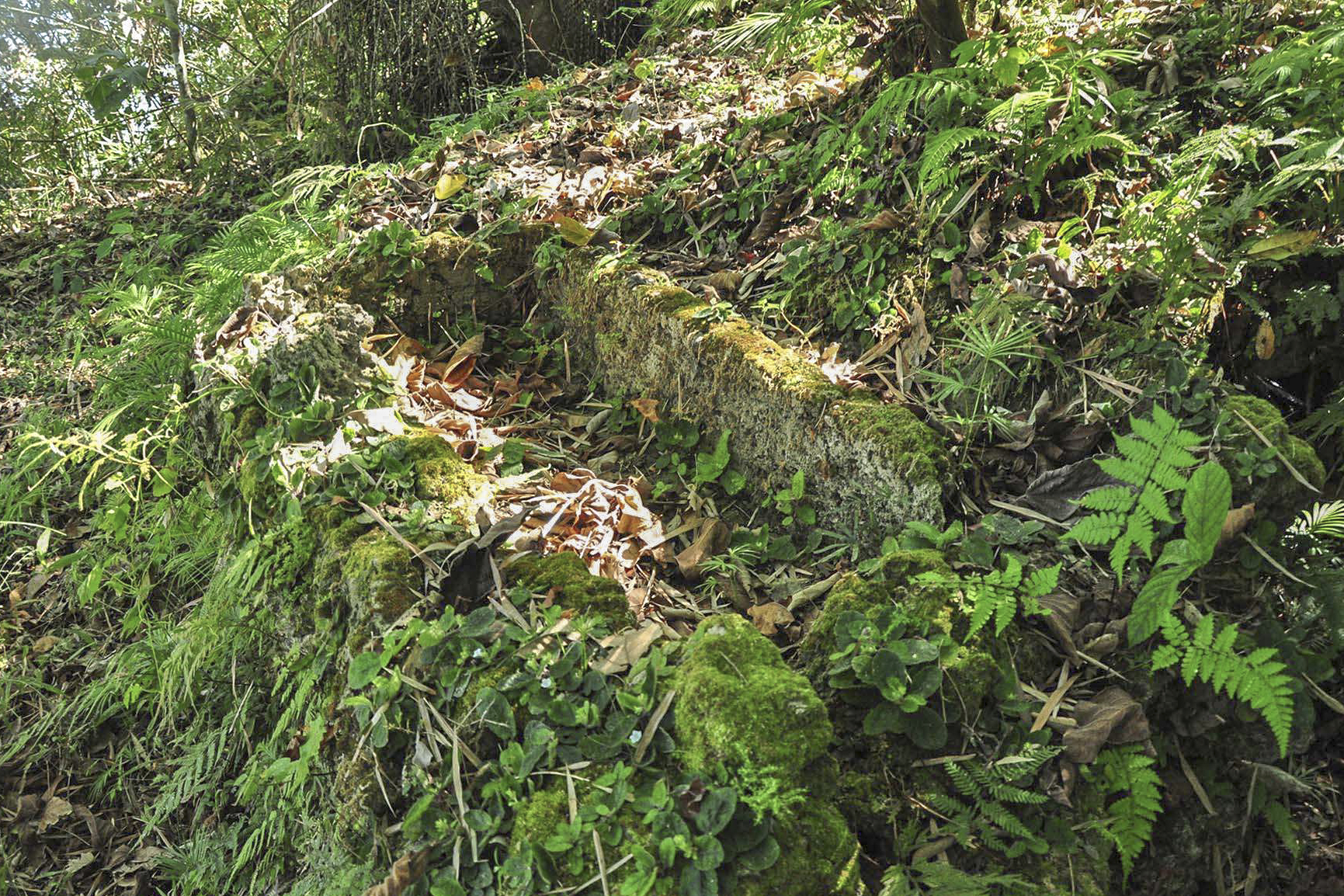

- Location of the Limestone tombs.
- 13°31′13″N 122°25′13″E
- Type: Tomb complex / Burial site
- Cultures: Ancient Tagalog people
- Associated with: Maharlikas and common peoples
- Location: Mulanay, Quezon province
- Part of: Philippines

History
- Built: c. 9th century
- Abandoned: c. 15th century

Site notes
- Material: Limestone
- Area: 280 ha (690 acres)
- Excavation dates: 2011–2012
- Management: Buenavista Protected Landscape of Mulanay, Quezon, National Museum of the Philippines

The Limestone Tombs of Kamhantik refer to the excavated remains of a thousand-year-old barangay (a term used to connote a polity during the classical era) found in the jungles of Mount Maclayao in Sitio Kamhantik within the Buenavista Protected Landscape of Mulanay, Quezon, Philippines. It is widely believed that pre-colonial Tagalog people were responsible for the creation of the tombs.

It is composed of fifteen limestone coffins that can be dated back from the period of 10th to 14th century based on one of National Museum's top archaeologist "a complex archaeological site with both habitation and burial remains from the period of approximately 10th to the 14th century ... the first of its kind in the Philippines having carved limestone tombs." However, after carbon-dating the human bones found on the site, it was known that the age of the site is much older, between 890 and 1030 AD.

== Discovery ==
The archaeological site is part of 280 hectares (692 acres) of forest land that was declared a government-protected area in 1998 to keep away treasure hunters and slash-and-burn farmers. Treasure hunters looking for gold exposed some of the limestone tombs years ago, but it was only in 2011 that Manila-based archaeologists started to unearth the graves and artifacts and realize the significance of the find. Numerous fragments with peculiar inscriptions were found throughout the site. Experts noted that the tombs used to have lids that were most likely decorated with various pre-colonial designs. However, the lids, skeletons, and other death goods that were supposed to be within the tombs have already been taken by treasure hunters before scientists managed to fully study the site. Locals at the foothills of the mountain have cited white-skinned foreigners who went to the mountains years ago as the likely culprits. The National Museum of the Philippines deemed that the stolen Filipino treasures may now be in private collections or museums around the world, without anyone knowing that they were illegally taken from the Philippines and its people.

The site is the focal property of the Buenavista Protected Landscape, which is being nominated by locals in the tentative list of the Philippines for designation in the UNESCO World Heritage List.

== Mythology ==
It is widely believed by the locals of Mulanay (the town encompassing the archaeological site) that the Kamhantik tombs were built by their Tagalog ancestors with the help from enchanted beings, called anitos, sent by Bathala, the supreme deity of the Tagalog ethnic people. Prior to scientific discovery, the ruins were already much known to the Mulanay townsfolk, and they consider the ruins as one of the most sacred places for the anitos, and therefore, a dambana. Due to this belief, it was only recently when the area was known to scientists. The townsfolk do not traverse the area much as they considered it too sacred, and they might disturb the anitos living within the forest and the ruins, the reason why the area was looted by white foreigners without the knowledge of the townsfolk. It was only discovered in 2011 that the area has been looted. All sarcophagi seals of the tombs were taken away, along with all sacred objects and almost all bone fragments inside the tombs.
