= Buenavista Protected Landscape =

Protected area in Quezon, Philippines

- IUCN category V (protected landscape/seascape)
- Location within Philippines
- Location: Quezon, Philippines
- Nearest city: Lucena
- Coordinates: 13°31′59″N 122°25′59″E
- Area: 284.27 hectares (702.4 acres)
- Established: June 27, 1937 (Watershed forest reserve); April 23, 2000 (Protected landscape)
- Governing body: Department of Environment and Natural Resources

The Buenavista Protected Landscape is a conservation area and an archaeological site located on Bondoc Peninsula in the southern Luzon province of Quezon in the Philippines. It conserves an important watershed area composed of secondary-growth forest, grassland and coconut land in the rural village of Buenavista within the coastal municipality of Mulanay. The area was primarily set aside for watershed protection and timber production in 1937 by President Manuel L. Quezon covering approximately 356 hectares (880 acres). In 2000, it was reestablished by President Joseph Estrada as a protected landscape area under the National Integrated Protected Areas System. The area is known as the site of an ancient village containing unique limestone graves discovered in 2011. The protected area, including the limestone tombs of Kamhantik were recommended by various scholars to be included in the tentative list of UNESCO World Heritage Sites, yet government or private entities have yet to file a tentative nomination to the UNESCO Secretariat.

== Description ==
The Buenavista Protected Landscape is an important watershed crossed by several rivers and streams such as the Mulanay River, Taisan Creek and Mahanao Creek which empty into the Sibuyan Sea. It is centered on Mount Maclayao (also known as Mount Kamhantik), the municipality's highest peak which rises to 1,260 metres (4,130 ft) above sea level, in the sitio of Kamhantik in Barangay Buenavista. The protected area also contains several caves in the karst area extending to the village of Amuguis.

The grasslands within the park are dominated by cogon grass and talahib. In the hilly areas grow forest tree species such as ipil-ipil, madre cacao and hauili. They provide the habitat for many migratory bird species such as the great egret, little egret, little heron, striated heron, plover, charadrius sp., whimbrel, common redshank, common greenshank, common tern and whiskered tern. Other wildlife known to inhabit the area include monitor lizards, wild cats, hornbills, owls, wild doves and bats. The landscape is also home to Strongylodon juangonzalezii discovered in 2016.

== Archaeological site ==
On the forest-covered summit of Mount Maclayao in Sitio Kamhantik, at least 15 limestone coffins dating to approximately the 10th to the 14th century have been unearthed by Filipino archaeologists in 2012. According to the National Museum of the Philippines, the limestone coffins are "similar to ancient sarcophagus with round holes where wooden posts of houses or sheds may have stood" but the covers are missing, probably due to irresponsible treasure hunters during the Yamashita hype in the late 20th century. These rectangular tombs carved into limestone outcrops from the forest ground are said to be at least 1,000 years old based on US carbon dating tests carried out on a human tooth found in one of the graves. An ancient canal drainage system is also profound in the area, where some canals go under centuries-old balete trees. Numerous limestone coffins are also located under centuries-old trees. In addition, archaeologists have also discovered shards of earthen jars, metal objects, and bone fragments of humans, monkeys, wild pigs, and other animals in the tombs. The site is unique in the Philippines in that it is the only ancient burial site with tombs made of stone material carved by metal tools. In 2015, the National Museum of the Philippines sent another team to do archaeological work in the site. The NM team found more human bone fragments, glass beads, gold artifacts, a small bell, and many others, however, the missing covers of the sarcophagi were not found. More than seventy percent of the site have yet to be studied and surveyed.

== Accessibility ==
The Buenavista Protected Landscape is located about 3 kilometres (1.9 mi) east of the poblacion or town proper of Mulanay and some 135 kilometres (84 mi) southeast from the Quezon provincial capital of Lucena. It is accessible via the Pan-Philippine Highway (AH26) and the Miguel Suarez Highway (Bondoc Peninsula National Road) from Lucena and Manila to Mulanay, and through an access road to the base camp in Buenavista from the Mulanay town proper.
