= Mulanay =

Municipality in Quezon, Philippines

- Municipality
- Municipality of Mulanay
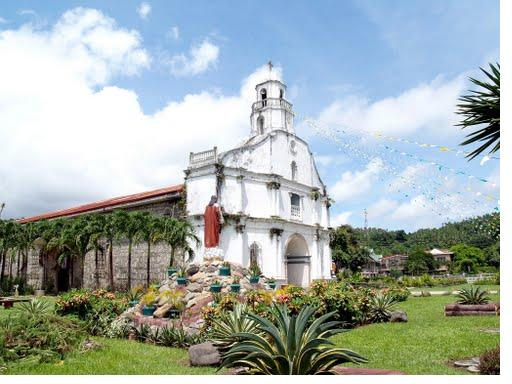
- Mulanay Church

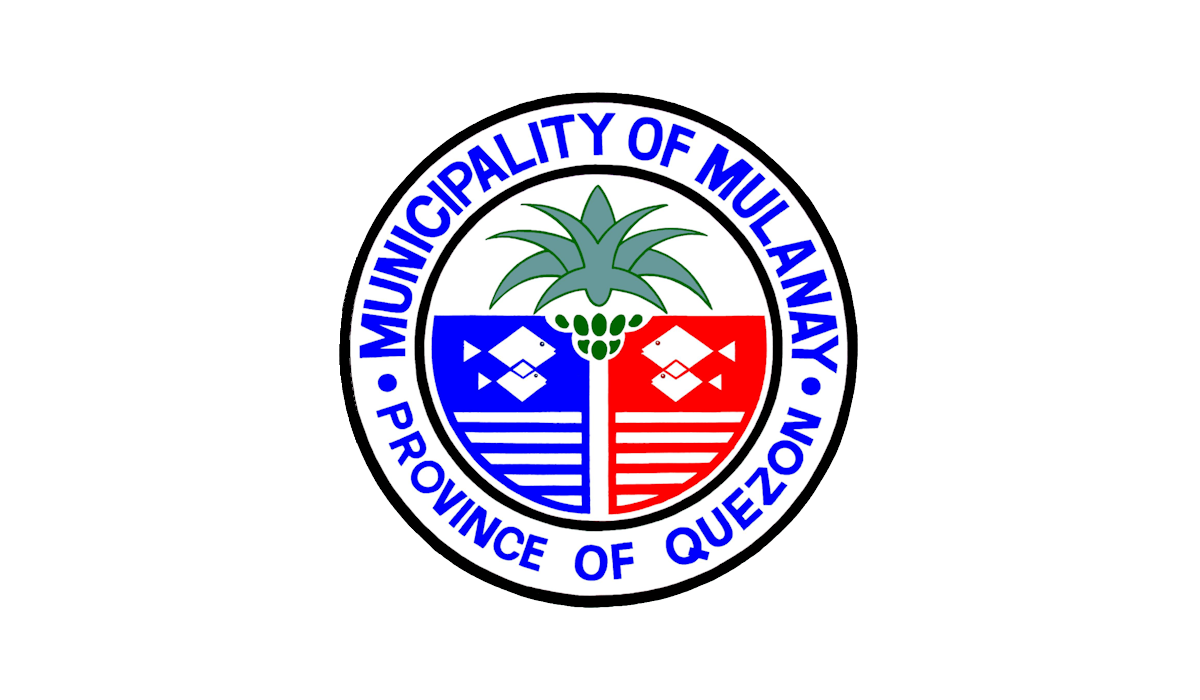
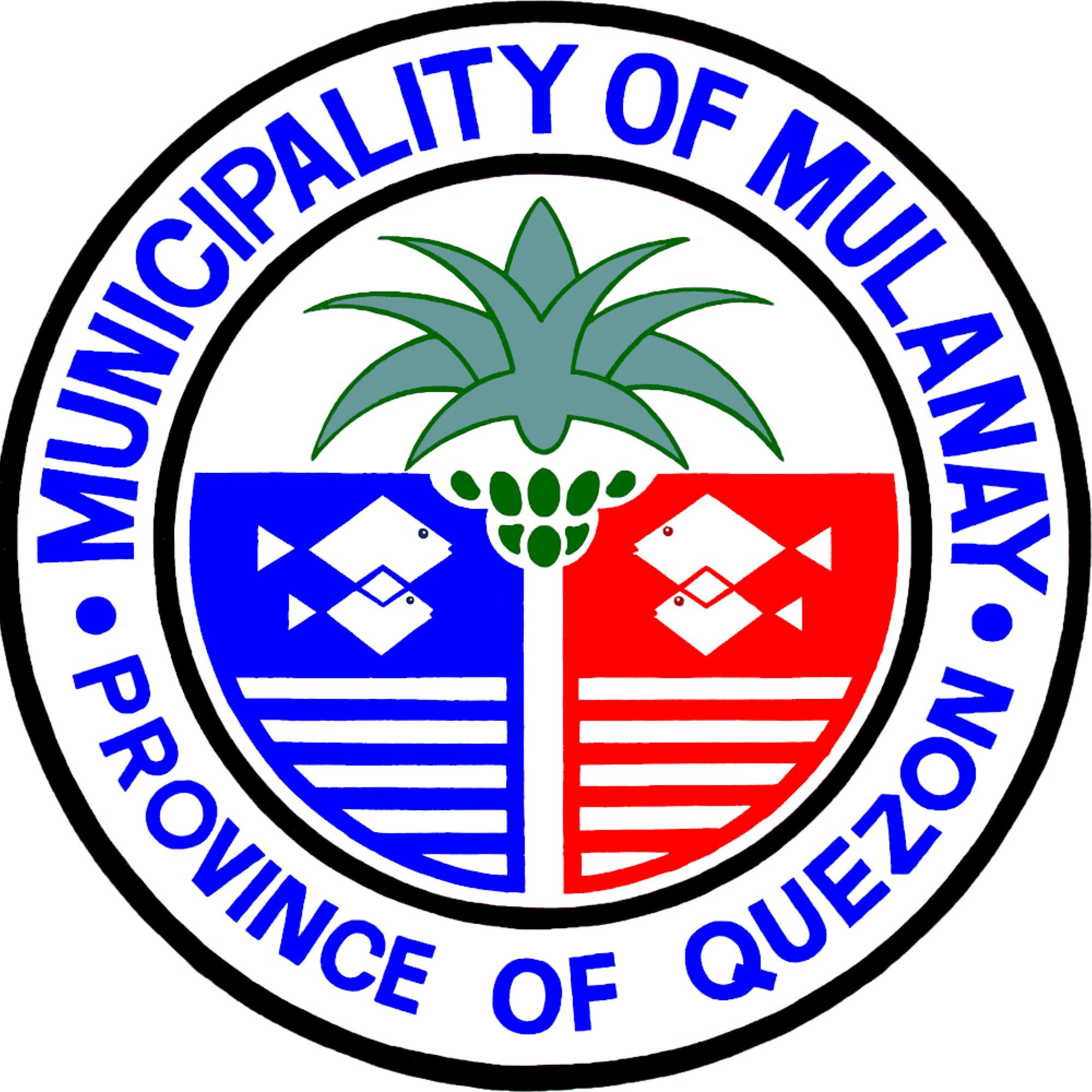
- Flag Seal

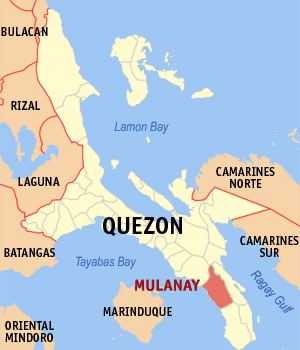
- Map of Quezon with Mulanay highlighted
- Interactive map of Mulanay
- Location within the Philippines
- Coordinates: 13°31′20″N 122°24′15″E
- Country: Philippines
- Region: Calabarzon
- Province: Quezon
- District: 3rd district
- Founded: February 4, 1745
- Barangays: 28 (see Barangays)

Government
  - Type: Sangguniang Bayan
  - Mayor: Aristotle L. Aguirre
  - Vice Mayor: Jay E. Castilleja
  - Representative: Reynante U. Arrogancia
  - Municipal Council: Members: Kristine A. Adao; Alexander Derrick B. Morales; Mary Grace C. Buela; Fernandito T. Baronia; Maria Victoria R. Sarapat; Angelito T. Amisola; Jesús G. Recto; Rodil M. Rogel
  - Electorate: 36,143 voters (2025)

Area
  - Total: 420.00 km^{2} (162.16 sq mi)
- Elevation: 62 m (203 ft)
- Highest elevation: 386 m (1,266 ft)
- Lowest elevation: 0 m (0 ft)

Population (2024 census)
  - Total: 53,976
  - Density: 128.51/km^{2} (332.85/sq mi)
  - Households: 13,458
- Demonym: Mulanayin

Economy
  - Income class: 1st municipal income class
  - Poverty incidence: 12.97% (2023)
  - Revenue: ₱ 304.6 million (2024)
  - Assets: ₱ 871.3 million (2024)
  - Expenditure: ₱ 116.4 million (2024)
  - Liabilities: ₱ 224.4 million (2024)

Service provider
  - Electricity: Quezon 1 Electric Cooperative (QUEZELCO 1)
- Time zone: UTC+8 (PST)
- ZIP code: 4312
- PSGC: 0405628000
- IDD : area code: +63 (0)42
- Native languages: Tagalog
- Website: https://mulanay.gov.ph/

Mulanay, officially the Municipality of Mulanay (Tagalog: Bayan ng Mulanay), is a municipality in the province of Quezon, Philippines. According to the 2024 census, it has a population of 53,976 people.

The municipality is being considered to be listed in the tentative list for UNESCO World Heritage Site inscription due to its architectural marvels, notably its baroque church, its preserved ancestral houses, and the Limestone tombs of Kamhantik, a highly-significant Tagalog archaeological site and dambana, in the Buenavista Protected Landscape.

== Etymology ==
Some legends would relate Mulanay to have derived its name from the Tagalog word Malunay, which means "Plenty of Lunay". Lunay is the vernacular term for Pili wax, which was abundant in the area.

== History ==
The archaeological exploration and excavation at the Mt. Kamhantik Archaeological Site, led by Dr. Eusebio Z. Dizon from the National Museum of the Philippines, revealed that Mulanay was inhabited by an organized Austronesian-speaking community from 500 to 1300 AD, descended from Austronesians who migrated from Taiwan.

Carbon dating of teeth from burial No. 5 at the site revealed a date of 890 AD, while artifacts from a 2015 excavation included Neolithic stone tools and pottery similar to early Huynh-Kalanay styles from Taiwan and Vietnam, dating between 1000 BCE and 200 AD. Ceramics from the Sung Dynasty (960-1279 AD) were also discovered. These findings suggest that the ancestors from Mt. Kamhantik participated in trade networks between 500 and 1300 AD.

The evangelization of Mulanay by the Franciscan Missionaries was in 1600, while its civil foundation as a municipality was effected in 1745 through the approval of the King of Spain. During the Spanish regime, Mulanay was composed of the municipal territories of what is now San Narciso, San Francisco, Catanauan and San Andres, which was as big as the province of Bataan. In 1755, Catanauan became a separate municipality followed by other remaining municipalities. Mulanay's territorial jurisdiction was reduced to 42,000 hectares (100,000 acres).

The original town of Mulanay composed of six (6) barangays was raided by the Moro pirates that led the town's executive together with the barangay heads to transfer the town site to the so-called Mayordomo, a sitio of Barangay Latangan. After several years, raids along coastal areas were lessened. The people returned to the town site, however, few barangay heads disagreed and left for Bantuin, Marinduque and Mindoro.

In 1938, barrios Bondo, Cawayan, Inabuan, Ilayang Tayuman, Ibabang Tayuman, Kasay, Mañongon, Pagsangahan, and Silongin were separated from Mulanay to form the newly established municipality of Bondo (present-day San Francisco).

The first town mayor during the American Occupation was Mayor Atanacio Ojeda.

== Geography ==
Mulanay is situated on the Bondoc Peninsula; its geographical coordinates are 13° 31′ 20″ North, 122° 24′ 15″ East, and its original name was Malunay. Mulanay is 149 kilometers (93 mi) from Lucena and 279 kilometers (173 mi) from Manila.

The town proper, with her plain landscape, is a coastal town facing the Tayabas Bay.

=== Barangays ===
Mulanay is politically subdivided into 28 barangays - as indicated below - 4 of which comprise the poblacion. Each barangay consists of puroks and some have sitios.

- Ajos
- Amuguis
- Anonang
- Bagong Silang
- Bagupaye
- Barangay Poblacion 1
- Barangay Poblacion 2
- Barangay Poblacion 3
- Barangay Poblacion 4
- Bolo
- Buenavista
- Burgos
- Butanyog
- Canuyep
- F. Nanadiego
- Ibabang Cambuga
- Ibabang Yuni
- Ilayang Cambuga (Mabini)
- Ilayang Yuni
- Latangan
- Magsaysay
- Matataja
- Pakiing
- Patabog
- Sagongon
- San Isidro
- San Pedro
- Santa Rosa

=== Climate ===
Climate data for Mulanay, Quezon
Month	Jan	Feb	Mar	Apr	May	Jun	Jul	Aug	Sep	Oct	Nov	Dec	Year
Mean daily maximum °C (°F)	27 (81)	28 (82)	30 (86)	32 (90)	31 (88)	30 (86)	29 (84)	29 (84)	29 (84)	29 (84)	29 (84)	28 (82)	29 (85)
Mean daily minimum °C (°F)	21 (70)	21 (70)	22 (72)	23 (73)	25 (77)	25 (77)	25 (77)	25 (77)	25 (77)	24 (75)	23 (73)	22 (72)	23 (74)
Average precipitation mm (inches)	31 (1.2)	23 (0.9)	25 (1.0)	30 (1.2)	85 (3.3)	145 (5.7)	182 (7.2)	153 (6.0)	172 (6.8)	150 (5.9)	113 (4.4)	68 (2.7)	1,177 (46.3)
Average rainy days	11.3	8.5	9.7	11.3	18.3	23.2	26.6	25.4	25.9	24.2	19.7	15.2	219.3
Source: Meteoblue

== Demographics ==
Population census of Mulanay
Year	Pop.	±% p.a.
1903	2,149	—
1918	3,404	+3.11%
1939	3,957	+0.72%
1948	5,149	+2.97%
1960	9,859	+5.56%
1970	23,481	+9.05%
1975	28,011	+3.60%
1980	31,701	+2.50%
1990	38,659	+2.00%
1995	43,617	+2.29%
2000	45,903	+1.10%
2007	48,538	+0.77%
2010	50,826	+1.69%
2015	53,123	+0.85%
2020	55,576	+0.95%
2024	53,976	−0.70%
Source: Philippine Statistics Authority

The populace of Mulanay is composed of different ethnic groups like Tagalogs, Visayans and Bicolanos.

== Economy ==
Poverty incidence of Mulanay (%)

Source: Philippine Statistics Authority

The municipality is an agricultural town where farm crops like coconut, garlic, bananas, rice, corn, peanuts, mongo, ginger, squash, and other vegetables are abundantly harvested. Mulanay lies along the coast of Tayabas Bay, an abundant fishing ground.

== Government ==
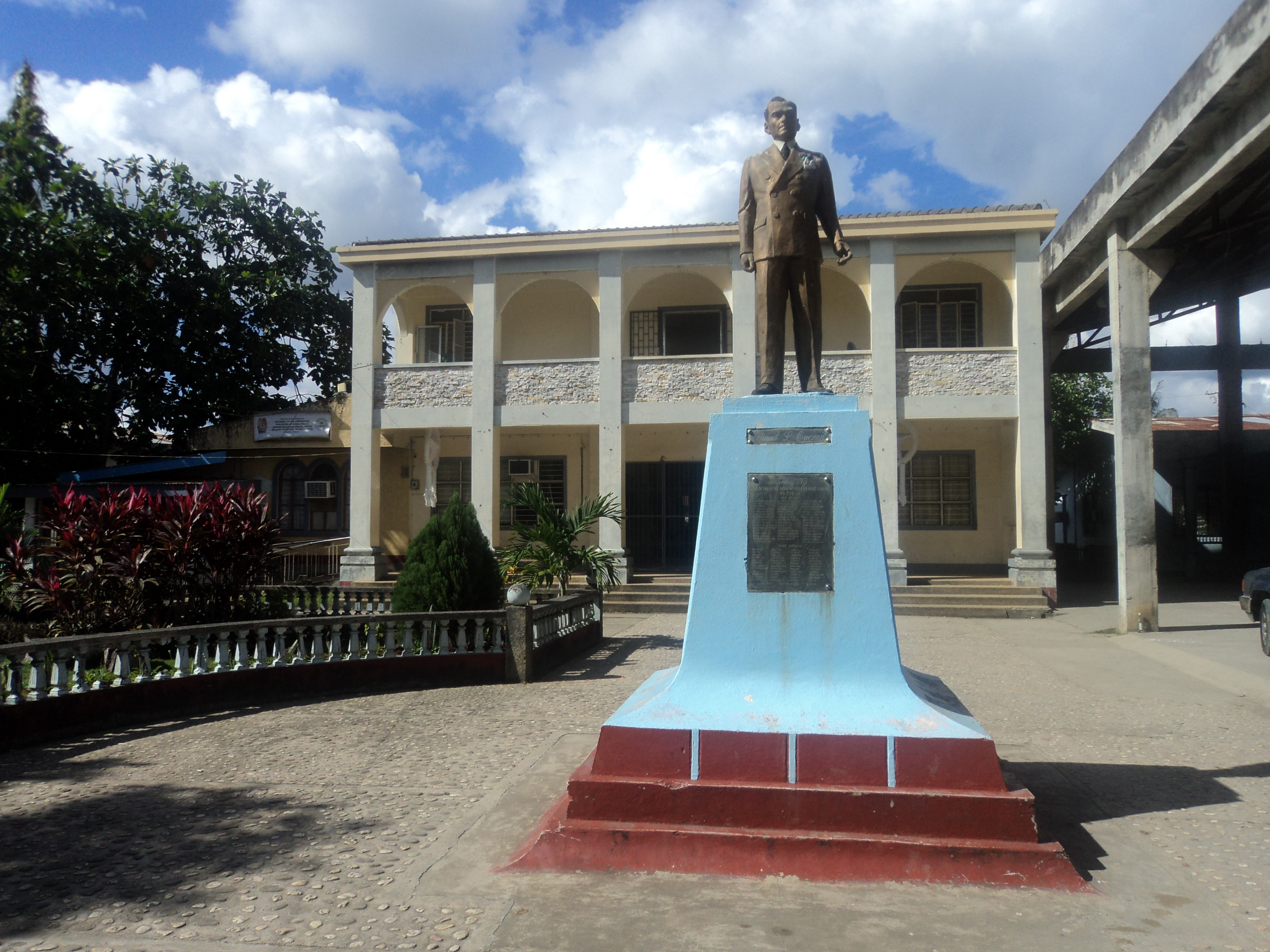
Town Hall and ML Quezon Monument

=== Elected officials ===
Municipal council (2025–present):

- Mayor: Aris L. Aguirre
- Vice-Mayor: Jay E. Castilleja

Councilors

- Tinan Aguirre-Adao
- Alex Morales
- Grace Buela
- Andy Baronia
- Vicky Sarapat
- Gelo Amisola
- Jesus Recto
- Rodil Rogel

== Tourism ==
=== Amuguis Falls ===
Amuguis Falls are located in Barangay Amuguis. These waterfalls are an undeveloped tourist destination, surrounded by forest trees and big rock formation where locals usually go for picnics and gathering.

=== Malaking Bato ===
The century-old legendary boulder along the coast of Barangay Santa Rosa which had been famous as a picnic spot among the residents and visitors alike.

=== Buenavista Protected Landscape ===
A protected area situated in Barangay Buenavista that preserves a major watershed forest.

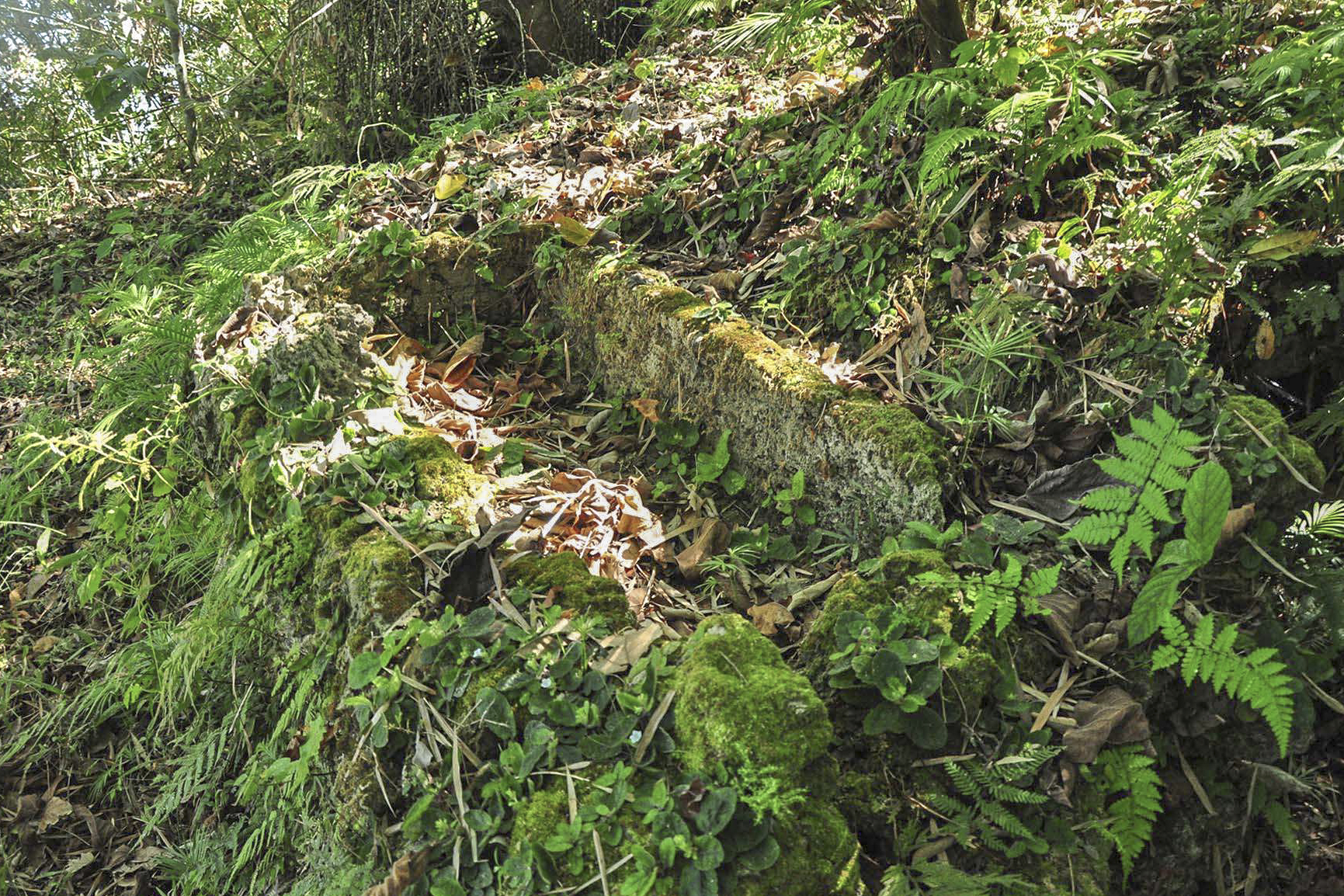
Limestone tombs of Kamhantik

=== Limestone tombs of Kamhantik ===
A thousand-year-old limestone-curved burial site of ancient people declared as a certified historical site by the National Museum of the Philippines. It is located within the Buenavista Protected Landscape. The site is a high-level dambana to Anitism adherents.

=== Churches ===
- San Pedro Apóstol Parish (est. 1835)
- Nuestra Señora del Perpetuo Socorro Parish (est. 2006)

== Education ==
The Mulanay Schools District Office governs all educational institutions within the municipality. It oversees the management and operations of all private and public, from primary to secondary schools.

=== Primary and elementary schools ===
- Acaciahan Elementary School
- Ajos Elementary School
- Anonang Elementary School
- Bagupaye Elementary School
- Bolo Elementary School
- Buenavista Elementary School
- Burgos Elementary School
- Calangcang Elementary School
- Canuyep Elementary School
- Ibabang Yuni Elementary School
- Ilayang Cambuga Elementary School
- Ilayang Yuni Elementary School
- Latangan Elementary School
- Magsaysay Elementary School
- Malibago Elementary School
- Matataja Elementary School
- Mulanay Central Elementary School
- Pakiing Elementary School
- Parang Elementary School
- Patabog Elementary School
- Pinagpalapalahan Elementary School
- San Isidro Elementary School
- San Pedro Elementary School
- Santa Rosa Elementary School
- St. Peter Catholic School
- Sumagonsong Elementary School

=== Secondary schools ===
- Acebe Systems Technology Institute
- Ajos National High School
- Bagupaye National High School
- Burgos National High School
- Bondoc Peninsula Agricultural High School
- Doña Francisca Alvarez Rejano Integrated School
- Eduardo Cojuangco Jr. Grade School
- Ilayang Yuni Junior and Senior Integrated National High School
- Magsaysay National High School
- Malunay Institute
- Pakiing National High School
