= Tropical Storm Nalgae =

Pacific severe tropical storm in 2022

Severe Tropical Storm Nalgae (Paeng)
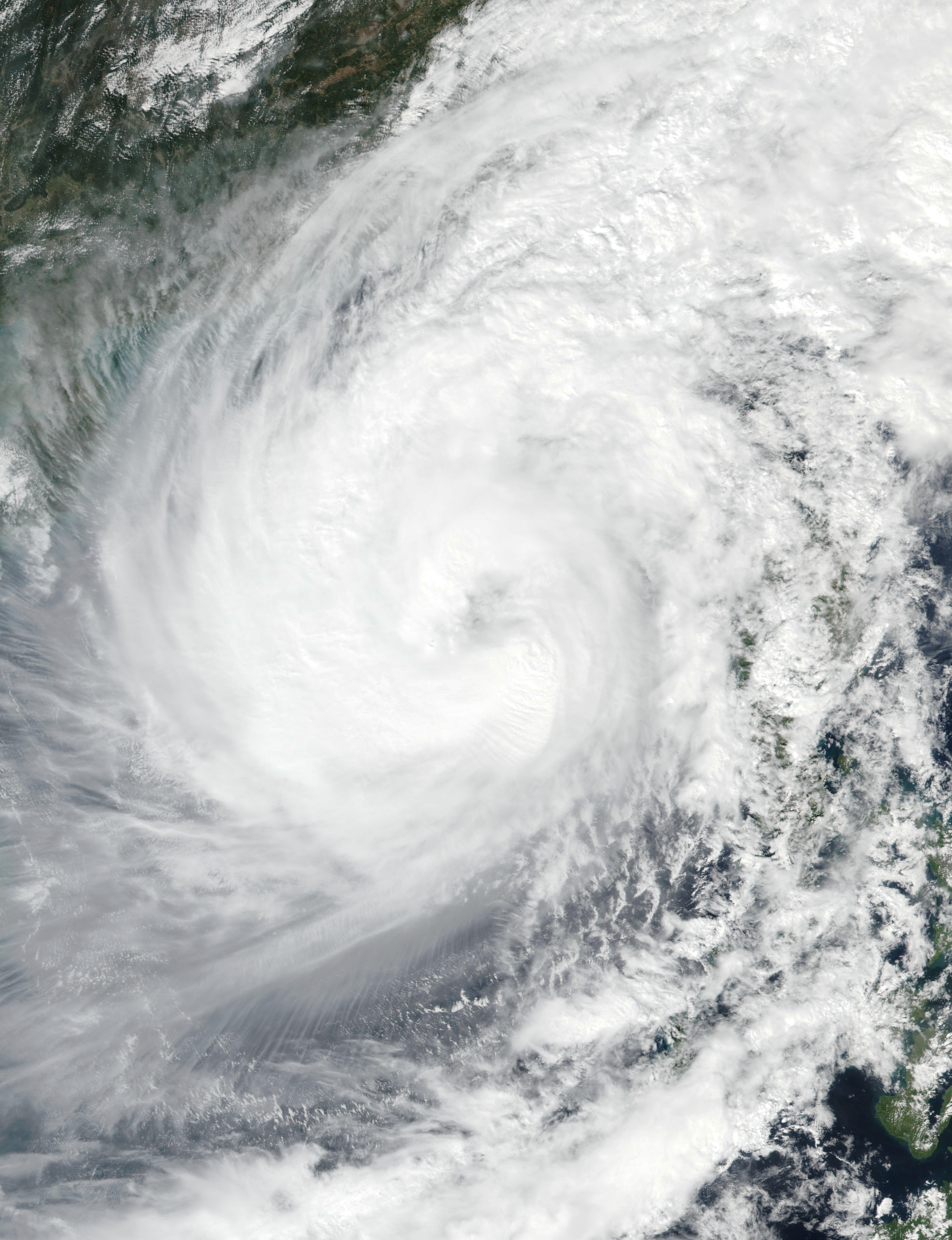
- Severe Tropical Storm Nalgae at peak intensity on October 31

Meteorological history
- Formed: October 26, 2022
- Dissipated: November 3, 2022

Severe tropical storm
- 10-minute sustained (JMA)
- Highest winds: 110 km/h (70 mph)
- Lowest pressure: 975 hPa (mbar); 28.79 inHg

Category 1-equivalent typhoon
- 1-minute sustained (SSHWS/JTWC)
- Highest winds: 140 km/h (85 mph)
- Lowest pressure: 972 hPa (mbar); 28.70 inHg

Overall effects
- Fatalities: 164
- Injuries: 270
- Missing: 28
- Damage: $225 million (2022 USD)
- Areas affected: Philippines; South China
- IBTrACS
- Part of the 2022 Pacific typhoon season

Severe Tropical Storm Nalgae, (Note: The name Nalgae (Korean: 날개, [na̠ɭɡɛ]) was contributed by North Korea and means wing in Korean.) known in the Philippines as Severe Tropical Storm Paeng, was a very large and deadly tropical cyclone that wreaked havoc across the Philippines and later impacted South China in late October 2022. Nalgae was the twenty-second named storm of the 2022 Pacific typhoon season, Nalgae originated from an invest located east of the Philippines on October 26. The disturbance, initially designated as 93W, was eventually upgraded the following day to a tropical depression by the Joint Typhoon Warning Center (JTWC) and re-designated as 26W. The Japan Meteorological Agency (JMA) however, had already considered the disturbance as a tropical depression a day prior to JTWC's; PAGASA also followed the JMA's lead and gave it the name Paeng. That same day, it was upgraded again by the JMA to tropical storm status, thus gaining the name Nalgae.

The next day, the PAGASA and the JTWC upgraded Nalgae to a severe tropical storm status on October 28. Nalgae would eventually make its first landfall in Virac, Catanduanes, which was quickly followed by another landfall thirty minutes later. It then traversed the Bicol Region and emerged into Ragay Gulf, eventually making another landfall. Defying initial forecasts, Nalgae then moved southwestward and struck Mogpog. Afterwards, the storm moved northwestward into the Sibuyan Sea and struck Sariaya. Then it would move through many regions throughout the evening of October 29. Nalgae emerged over the South China Sea the next day and weakened below tropical storm status.

The storm would later re-intensify into a severe tropical storm a few hours later, and eventually exited the Philippine Area of Responsibility a day later. Upon its exit from Philippine jurisdiction, Nalgae then intensified into a Category 1-equivalent typhoon on JTWC; however, the JMA maintained its severe tropical storm classification for the system. It then approached the Pearl River Delta. At around 04:50 CST on November 3, 2022, Nalgae made its final landfall at Xiangzhou District as a tropical depression.

== Meteorological history ==
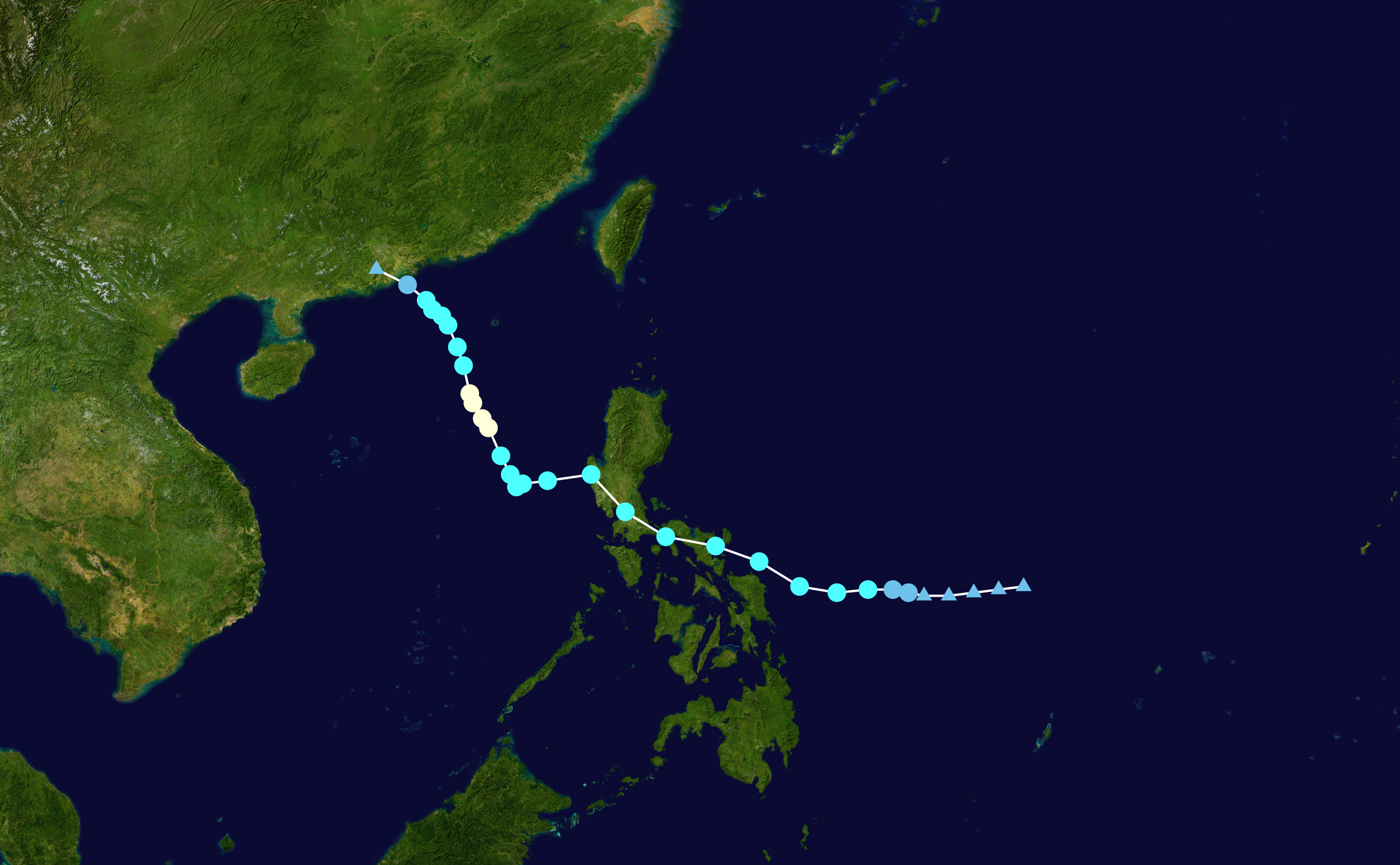
Map plotting the storm's track and intensity, according to the Saffir–Simpson scale Map key Saffir–Simpson scale Tropical depression (≤38 mph, ≤62 km/h) Tropical storm (39–73 mph, 63–118 km/h) Category 1 (74–95 mph, 119–153 km/h) Category 2 (96–110 mph, 154–177 km/h) Category 3 (111–129 mph, 178–208 km/h) Category 4 (130–156 mph, 209–251 km/h) Category 5 (≥157 mph, ≥252 km/h) Unknown Storm type Tropical cyclone Subtropical cyclone Extratropical cyclone, remnant low, tropical disturbance, or monsoon depression

On October 26, 2022, the Joint Typhoon Warning Center (JTWC) reported in its TCFA bulletin that a low pressure area near the Philippines was able to develop because of warm waters and low wind shear. The agency designated it as Invest 93W. The Japan Meteorological Agency (JMA) and the Philippine Atmospheric, Geophysical and Astronomical Services Administration (PAGASA), however, went further and already classified the disturbance as a tropical depression, with the latter assigning the name Paeng to the system. The JTWC would only upgrade the system to a tropical depression a day later, at 00:00 UTC on October 27, and it was given the designation 26W. At the same time, the JMA upgraded the cyclone to a tropical storm, and was named Nalgae. The following day, PAGASA and the JTWC upgraded Nalgae to a severe tropical storm status on October 28. Early next day (local time), Nalgae made its first landfall in Virac, Catanduanes, which was quickly followed by another landfall thirty minutes later in Caramoan, Camarines Sur. It then traversed the Bicol Region and emerged into Ragay Gulf, eventually making landfall in Buenavista, Quezon; the storm maintained its strength during this period. Defying initial forecasts, Nalgae then moved southwestward and struck Mogpog on the island province of Marinduque. Afterwards, the storm moved northwestward into the Sibuyan Sea and struck Sariaya, another municipality in Quezon province; it later moved through Laguna, Rizal, Cavite, Metro Manila and Bulacan throughout the evening of October 29. Nalgae emerged over the South China Sea the next day, and weakened below tropical storm status. The storm would later re-intensify into a severe tropical storm a few hours later, and eventually exited the Philippine Area of Responsibility a day later. Upon its exit from Philippine jurisdiction, Nalgae then intensified into a Category 1-equivalent typhoon on JTWC; however, the JMA maintained its severe tropical storm classification for the system. It then approached the Pearl River Delta. At around 04:50 CST on November 3, 2022, Nalgae made its final landfall at Xiangzhou District, Zhuhai as a tropical depression, making it the first tropical cyclone since Nepartak in 2003 to make landfall in China in November.

== Preparations ==
=== Philippines ===
==== Highest Tropical Cyclone Wind Signal ====
Highest Tropical Cyclone Wind Signal issued by PAGASA for Nalgae (Paeng) in each province. The white line represents the best track.

Due to Nalgae's threat, PAGASA issued Signal 1 warnings for the Bicol Region and Eastern Visayas. The PAGASA would later upgrade warnings for the Bicol Region and Eastern Visayas to Signal 2 warnings. PAGASA also added Signal 1 warnings for Caraga, Central Visayas, Mimaropa, and Calabarzon. At least 45 people died due to flooding and landslides in Mindanao, all of which occurring a day before the storm made its landfalls. Initially, 72 people were reported to have died, but the death toll was revised by the National Disaster Risk Reduction and Management Council (NDRRMC) because of erroneous counting on the part of local officials; however, the death toll would increase to 112 by November 1 as more bodies were recovered. More than a hundred flights were cancelled in the Philippines on October 28 and 29, most of which going to and coming from Ninoy Aquino International Airport. The storm also delayed the removal of the wreckage of Korean Air Flight 631 after it overran the runway at Mactan–Cebu International Airport. After Nalgae was upgraded to a severe tropical storm, PAGASA put up Tropical Cyclone Wind Signal Number 3 warnings in several areas of Southern Luzon, including Metro Manila.

The Philippine Institute of Volcanology and Seismology (PHIVOLCS) later warned of lahar from Mayon Volcano in Bicol during the tropical storm.

Several airlines based in the Philippines announced that their 124 domestic and international flights were cancelled, as a precautionary measure against the effects of the severe tropical storm.

The Philippine Coast Guard (PCG) announced that maritime travel was suspended in the Bicol Region, Calabarzon and Eastern Visayas regions.

On October 29, the Philippine Basketball Association (PBA), the University Athletic Association of the Philippines (UAAP), the Premier Volleyball League (PVL), the Shakey's Super League (SSL) and the National Collegiate Athletic Association (NCAA) announced that they would postpone their sporting events and games slated for October 29 and 30 as a precautionary measure. PAGASA issued their last bulletins as Nalgae exited the Philippine Area of Responsibility (PAR). After its exit, it had a death toll of 164 casualties, with 28 remaining missing.

=== Hong Kong and Macau ===
As Tropical Storm Nalgae tracked closer to Hong Kong, the Hong Kong Observatory issued its third highest strong wind warning (Signal No. 8) on November 3. This is the first time that the warning signal was raised to this level in November in 50 years since Pamela 1972. The storm came while the city was hosting a financial meeting of senior Wall Street executives; however, despite the said warning and impending impact, the event's organizers announced that it would continue as planned. All warning signals were lifted by November 4.

The Macao Meteorological and Geophysical Bureau hoisted Signal No 8 in response to Tropical Storm Nalgae. This is the first time the bureau has raised the warning signal to that level in November in 50 years. A state of immediate preparedness was declared in Macau and the Civil Protection Operation Centre was readied.

== Impact ==
=== Philippines ===
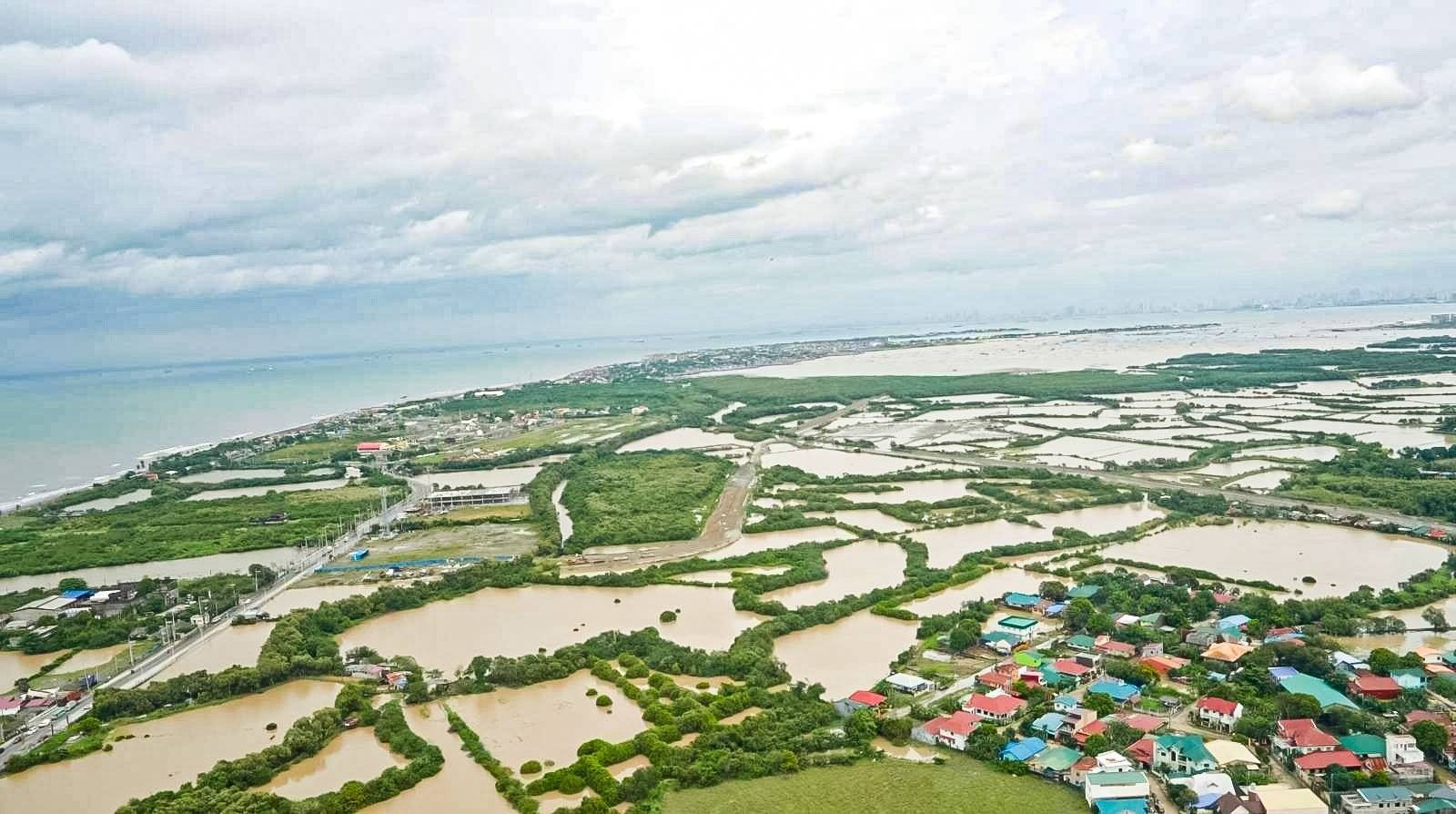
Flooding in Cavite.

By November 30, 164 individuals were reported dead due to Nalgae, with 270 others wounded and 28 people remaining missing. 68,422 houses were damaged, in which 6,634 of them were completely destroyed, causing a damage of ₱17.3 million (US$297,492). The estimated damage to the infrastructural sector was ₱5.87 billion (US$101 million), with even higher losses in agriculture, reached ₱7.21 billion (US$124 million). Other damaged assets amounted to be ₱1 million (US$17,000). Overall damage was ₱13.1 billion (US$225 million). On November 2, 2022, President Bongbong Marcos declared a state of calamity over Calabarzon, Bicol, Western Visayas, and the Bangsamoro regions via the President's Proclamation No. 84.

==== Mindanao–Visayas floods ====
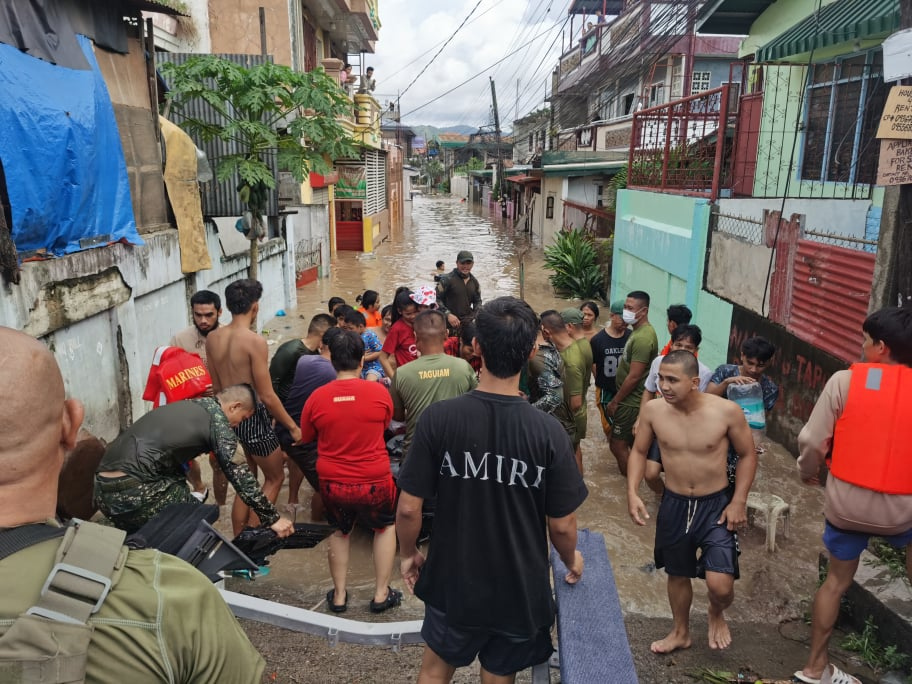
Flood rescue operation in Zamboanga City

On the island of Mindanao, at least 68 people died due to continuous flooding and landslides that were partially caused by Nalgae. 14 individuals were also confirmed to have been missing; 11 from the Maguindanao province, and 3 from the Soccsksargen region. The floods occurred just as Nalgae had inched closer towards Samar island. Despite the floods and moderate rain, no Wind Signal was given to Bangsamoro. Moderate rain is still expected to continue in the region until Nalgae moves further north in Luzon. In the region of Visayas, rain from Nalgae similarly caused floods in the region. The entire region of Western Visayas was set up to the highest emergency response level due to increasing floods, which has already caused 4 casualties in the province of Aklan. As of November 4, 36 deaths were recorded in Western Visayas. Majority of the fatalities were killed in flashflood and landslides. Antique still has the most number of casualties with 13 followed by Capiz and Iloilo provinces with a total of eight. Central Visayas also experienced light floods and multiple landslides, mostly around the province of Cebu. In Busay, Cebu City, six houses were destroyed from a landslide; however, no casualties were reported as the occupants evacuated before the landslide.

Due to the high death toll, Philippine President Bongbong Marcos criticized local authorities for not forcing residents to immediately evacuate following Nalgae's hit in the country.

=== Hong Kong and Macau ===
No casualties were reported in Hong Kong, although one woman was injured and hospitalized. No incidents were reported in Macau.

== Retirement ==
On May 5, 2023, the PAGASA retired the name Paeng from its rotating naming lists after it reached more than ₱1 billion in damage and high death toll on its onslaught in the country, and it will never be used again for another typhoon name within the Philippine Area of Responsibility (PAR). It was replaced with Pilandok — a Filipino word for Philippine mouse-deer (Tragulus nigricans) — for the 2026 season.

After the season, the Typhoon Committee announced that the name Nalgae, along with five others will be removed from the naming lists. In the spring of 2024, the name was replaced with Jamjari for future seasons, which means dragonfly in Korean.

== See also ==
- Tropical cyclones in 2022
- Typhoons in the Philippines
- Weather of 2022

Other tropical cyclones that had a similar track to Nalgae

- Typhoon Vera (Bebeng; 1983) – a Category 1-equivalent typhoon that made a similar approach in southern and central Luzon in July 1983.
- Typhoon Angela (Rosing; 1995) – a Category 5-equivalent super typhoon which had a comparable track to Nalgae.
- Typhoon Xangsane (Reming; 2000) – a typhoon that also impacted Luzon before recurving towards Taiwan almost exactly 22 years before Nalgae.
- Typhoon Xangsane (Milenyo; 2006) – a powerful typhoon which took an almost identical track while traversing southern Luzon in late-September 2006.
- Typhoon Conson (Basyang; 2010) – a minimal typhoon that took a similar path to Nalgae in mid-July 2010.
- Tropical Storm Rumbia (Gorio; 2013) – a severe tropical storm that affected the same provinces as Nalgae but only caused minimal damages.
- Typhoon Rammasun (Glenda; 2014) – a strong typhoon which also had a similar track and crossed central and southern Luzon in July 2014, causing widespread destruction.
- Typhoon Goni (Rolly; 2020) – another powerful typhoon which made a similar path while traversing the southern parts of Luzon in late-October 2020.
- Tropical Storm Conson (Jolina; 2021) - a severe tropical storm that also crossed some areas at southern Luzon on the previous year.
- Tropical Storm Wutip (2025) – a tropical storm that also crossed some areas at Hainan but similar trajectory to Nalgae.

Other tropical cyclones that caused flooding in Mindanao and Visayas

- Typhoon Fengshen (Frank; 2008) – an erratic typhoon which also caused severe flooding to various parts of Panay Island and caused the MV Princess of the Stars to sink.
- Tropical Storm Washi (Sendong; 2011) – a weak but deadly, late-season tropical storm that also caused flash floods in Mindanao in December 2011.
- Typhoon Bopha (Pablo; 2012) – a very destructive and deadly typhoon that caused widespread damages over Mindanao.
- Typhoon Tembin (Vinta; 2017) – another late-season system that also caused severe damage to parts of Mindanao in December 2017.
- Typhoon Rai (Odette; 2021) – another destructive typhoon that ravaged over Visayas and Mindanao on the previous year prior to Nalgae.
