= Alibijaban =

Island in Quezon, Philippines

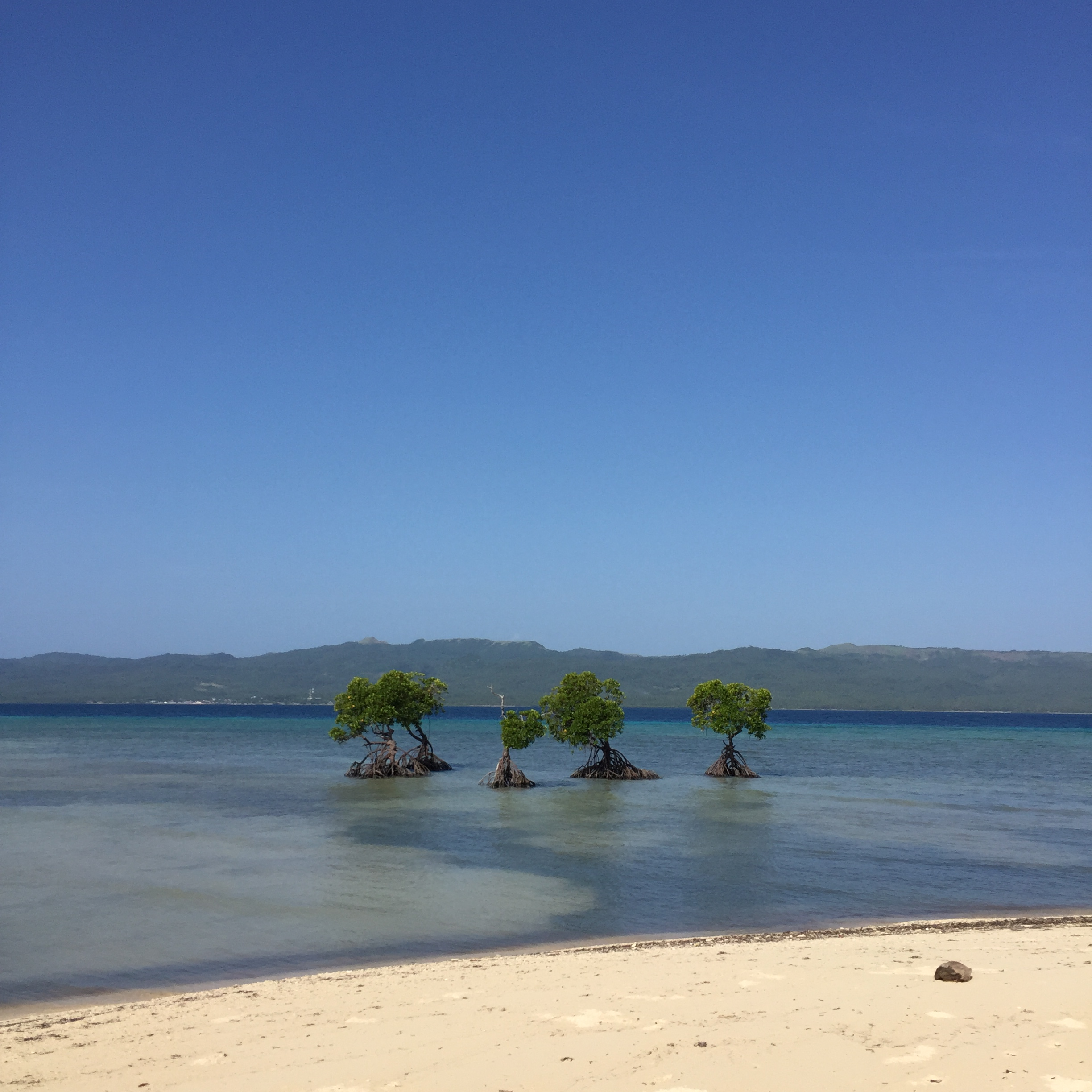
- The coast of Alibijaban facing Bondoc Peninsula

- Location within Philippines

Geography
- Location: 3.6 kilometers (2.2 mi) off San Andres, Quezon
- Coordinates: 13°21′11″N 122°43′7″E
- Adjacent to: Ragay Gulf

Administration
- Philippines
- Region: Calabarzon
- Province: Quezon
- Municipality: San Andres

Alibijaban, also spelled Alibihaban, is an island barangay located in the Ragay Gulf off the southeastern coast of Bondoc Peninsula on the Philippine island of Luzon. With a recorded population of 1,738 inhabitants in 2020, Alibijaban is the least populous of the seven barangays that compose the municipality of San Andres, in Quezon province and is the only one not on the mainland. It was previously part of the municipality of San Narciso until 1959.

The island is known for its pristine mangrove forest and coral reefs. It is also visited for its white sandy beaches and rich bird life. It is protected under the National Integrated Protected Areas System as a protected landscape and seascape called the Alibijaban Protected Landscape and Seascape which covers an area of 1,056 hectares (2,610 acres). Until 2025, it was classified as a wilderness area. 225 hectares (560 acres) of waters surrounding it have also been declared a marine protected area known as the Alibijaban Fish Sanctuary.

== Description ==
Alibihaban is located in the southwestern end of Ragay Gulf approximately 3.6 kilometres (2.2 mi) from the mainland of Bondoc Peninsula. It is roughly 4.6 kilometres (2.9 mi) from north to south, and 1.3 kilometres (0.81 mi) from east to west at its widest point. It is a low-lying island surrounded by a fringing reef which is interspersed with seagrass beds near the shore. The island's central and northern interior are dominated by mangrove wilderness, with most of the population concentrated on two sitios on the island's western and southwestern coast facing San Andres and Bondoc Peninsula. Its coastal formations include sandy beaches and rocky shores, particularly in its northeastern side.

The island is accessible via motorized banca from the port of San Andres. It is 330 kilometres (210 mi) southeast of Manila via the Pan-Philippine Highway and Bondoc Peninsula Road.

== Conservation ==
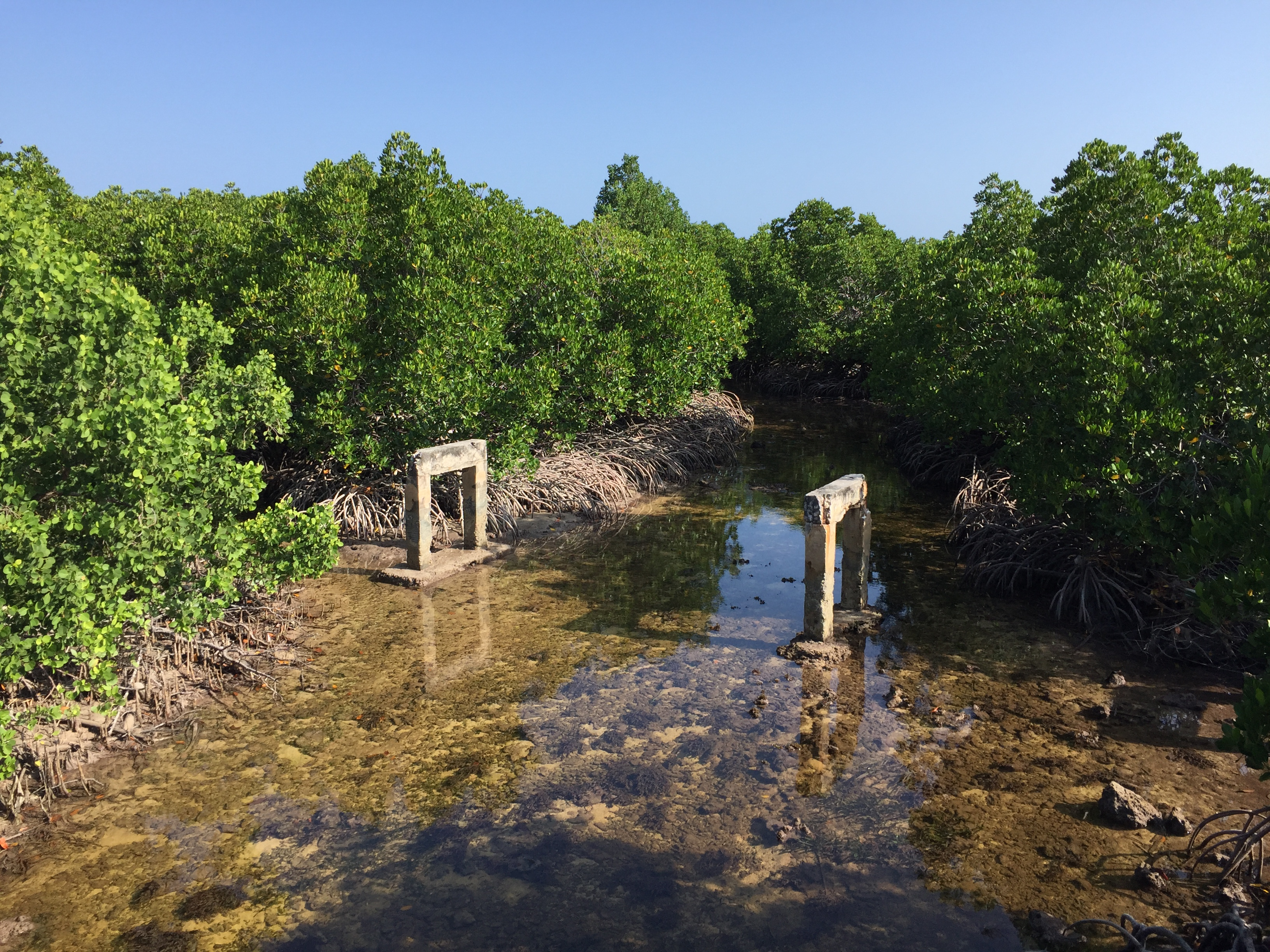
Alibijaban's mangrove forest

Alibihaban has some of the most undisturbed mangrove wilderness in the Philippines. It hosts at least 22 mangrove species and 14 species of birds, including the Tabon scrubfowl, white-collared kingfisher, jungle crow, black-naped oriole, Philippine collared dove, Asian glossy starling, chestnut munia, Philippine pied fantail, common emerald dove, black-crowned night heron, common snipe. It also supports a number of fruit bats and monitor lizards. Since the establishment on the island of a wilderness protected area in 1981, the Community Environment and Resources Office (CENRO) under the Department of Environment and Natural Resources and Provincial Government of Quezon now administers the area.

The island also has the most diverse marine habitat in the region of Ragay Gulf. It is home to at least 30 genera of hard coral dominated by Porites, Montipora and Acropora. Its adjacent waters are visited by whale sharks, manta rays, and pawikans (marine turtles). The passage of a municipal ordinance in 2006 prohibited all kinds of fishing in the area.

== Tourism ==
Alibihaban is an emerging backpacker destination. It's fine white sand beach and mangrove forest are few of the reasons why backpackers visit the island. Activities include camping, boating, and snorkeling.
