= Bondoc Peninsula =

Peninsula located in the southernmost part of Quezon

- Peninsula
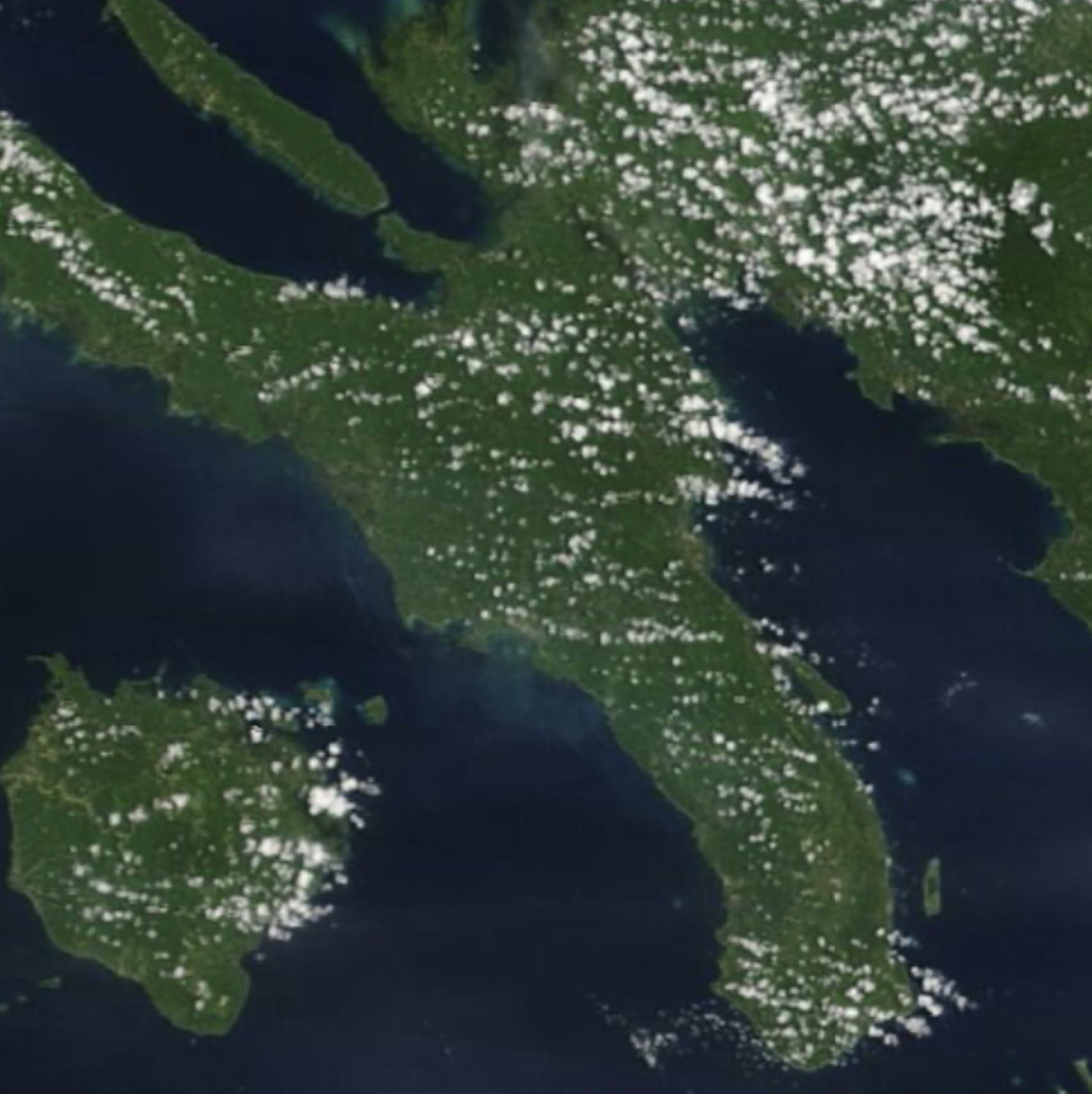
- Bondoc Peninsula seen from space with Marinduque presented on the left and Bicol on the right.

- Location within Philippines
- Coordinates: 13.4366667°N 122.5569444°E
- Location: Quezon Province, Calabarzon, Philippines
- Water bodies: Ragay Gulf (east), Sibuyan Sea (south), Tayabas Bay (west)
- Nickname: BonPen

Dimensions
  - Length: 182 kilometres (113 mi)
- Elevation: 192 m (630 ft)
- Highest elevation: 1,260 metres (4,130 ft) (Peak on Mount Maclayao)

The Bondoc Peninsula (commonly known as BonPen) is a narrow peninsula located in the southeastern part of Quezon Province in Calabarzon Region, southern part of Luzon, Philippines. The peninsula consists of 12 municipalities: Agdangan, Buenavista, Catanauan, General Luna, Macalelon, Mulanay, Padre Burgos, Pitogo, San Andres, San Francisco, San Narciso and Unisan, all in the 3rd Congressional District of Quezon and 325 total barangays. Catanauan is the most populous municipality with 72,252 citizens as of the 2020 census and the peninsula currently has 446,711 people according to the 2020 census. The peninsula is known for featuring beautiful beaches and historic churches and for holding the Buenavista Protected Landscape archaeological site at the peak of the tallest peak of Mount Maclayao. The peninsula remained largely agricultural with copra as its produce.

Those municipalities are mostly hilly and coastal areas. It has a unique festival named BonPen Festival featuring the beautiful sites of the district's twelve towns and promoting tourism in the area. The culture and arts of the peninsula is distinct compared with other districts in Quezon province. There has been a proposal to establish a province of Bondoc Peninsula, separating the 3rd congressional district of Quezon and forming it into a distinct province.

== Geography ==
The Bondoc Peninsula is a 182-kilometer long peninsula that consists of 12 municipalities and 325 barangays, all located within the 3rd Congressional District of Quezon, including Alibijaban Island. The largest municipality, being Mulanay spans approximately 420 km². It is bordered by water on three sides: to the east lies Ragay Gulf, to the south is the Sibuyan Sea, and to the west is Tayabas Bay. The Peninsula mostly consists of remote forests, hills, and mountainous terrain, while the municipality of Catanauan is an urban area. The southernmost part of the peninsula is referred to as "Bondoc Pt.". The peninsula is elevated at 192 meters. The peninsula's highest peak is at Mount Maclayao with an elevation of 1,260 meters (4,130 feet).

The peninsula is home to the Limestone tombs of Kamhantik, an archaeological site in the municipality of Mulanay and at the peak of Mount Maclayao.

== History ==
The Bondoc Peninsula is remaining largely agricultural, mainly producing copra.

From the late 1980s to the early 1990s, the peninsula was a battleground for the New People's Army. The NPA burnt houses, stole crops and killed farmers. In early 2018, the NPA abducted six workers and ravaged a ranch. Another case occurred at that same year when the NPA conducted an ambush on a military truck, injuring five soldiers and four civilians and causing a land-mine to explode. Up to this day, the NPA continues to conduct attacks and ambushes on the Bondoc Peninsula.

=== Human rights violations ===
In 2012, according to activists, the peninsula immediately became the site of enforced disappearances, intimidation, and harassment. Intense military operations have been conducted by government forces in the peninsula and massive military troops were present in the peninsula. Human rights advocates and various people's organizations gathered under the Save Bondoc Peninsula Movement conducted a Peace Caravan and Mercy Mission in the peninsula from June 25, 2012, to July 2, 2012. Their purpose was to document human rights abuses and provide relief operations, medical, and psychosocial assistance, among other services.

== Demographics ==
The majority of Bondoc Peninsula's inhabitants are Tagalogs and Roman Catholic Christianity is the dominant religion. They speak a Tagalog dialect influenced by those spoken in nearby Marinduque and eastern Oriental Mindoro, though Tayabas (Quezon) dialect and standard Tagalog (Filipino) are also spoken and understood. Another residents in the peninsula are Bicolanos who occupy its eastern part facing Bicolandia via Ragay Gulf, and Visayans (mainly Cebuano-speakers) who inhabit some remote areas of San Francisco and San Andres, due to its geographical contact with Cebuano-speaking parts of Burias Island in Masbate. Bicolano and Cebuano are heard in those areas as are Hiligaynon, Waray and Masbateño.

== See also ==
- Bicol Region
- Poro Point
- Quezon's 3rd congressional district
