= Pied fantail =

There are three species of bird called pied fantail.

- Malaysian pied fantail, Rhipidura javanica
- Philippine pied fantail, Rhipidura nigritorquis
- the pied morph of New Zealand fantail, Rhipidura fuliginosa
