= Ragay Gulf =

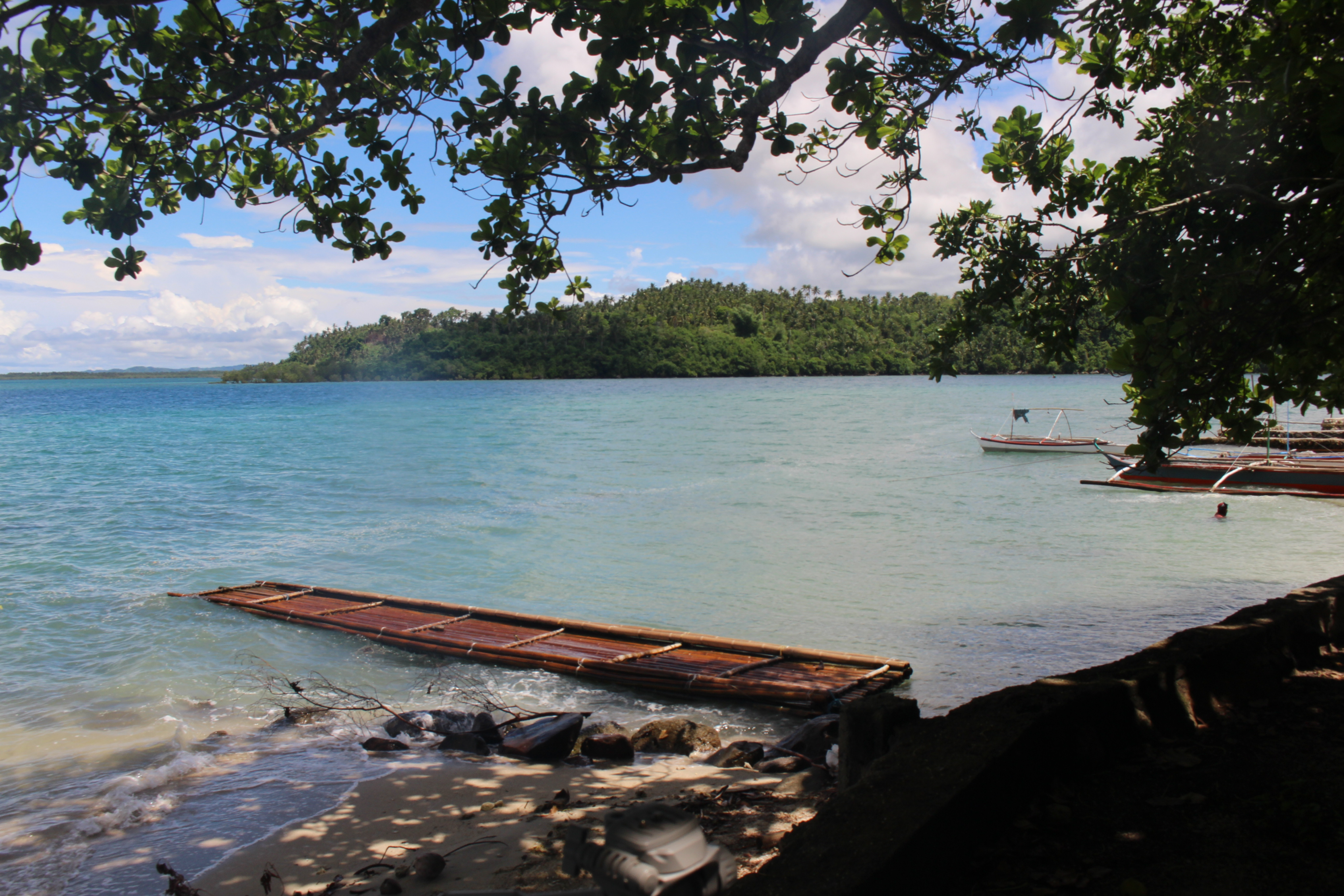
- Ragay Gulf

- Location within the Philippines Ragay Gulf (Philippines)
- Location: Bicol Region
- Coordinates: 13°35′02″N 123°03′55″E
- Type: gulf
- Etymology: Ragay
- Part of: Sibuyan Sea
- Settlements: Balatan; Bato; Buenavista; Bula; Del Gallego; Guinayangan; Libmanan; Libon; Lupi; Minalabac; Pasacao; Ragay; San Andres; San Fernando; San Narciso; Sipocot; Tagkawayan

Ragay Gulf is a large gulf in the Bicol Peninsula in Luzon, part of the Sibuyan Sea. It is separated from Tayabas Bay by the Bondoc Peninsula in the west. The gulf covers the provinces of Quezon and Camarines Sur. It is considered a key biodiversity area.
