= San Andres, Quezon =

Municipality in Quezon, Philippines

San Andres
- Municipality
- Municipality of San Andres
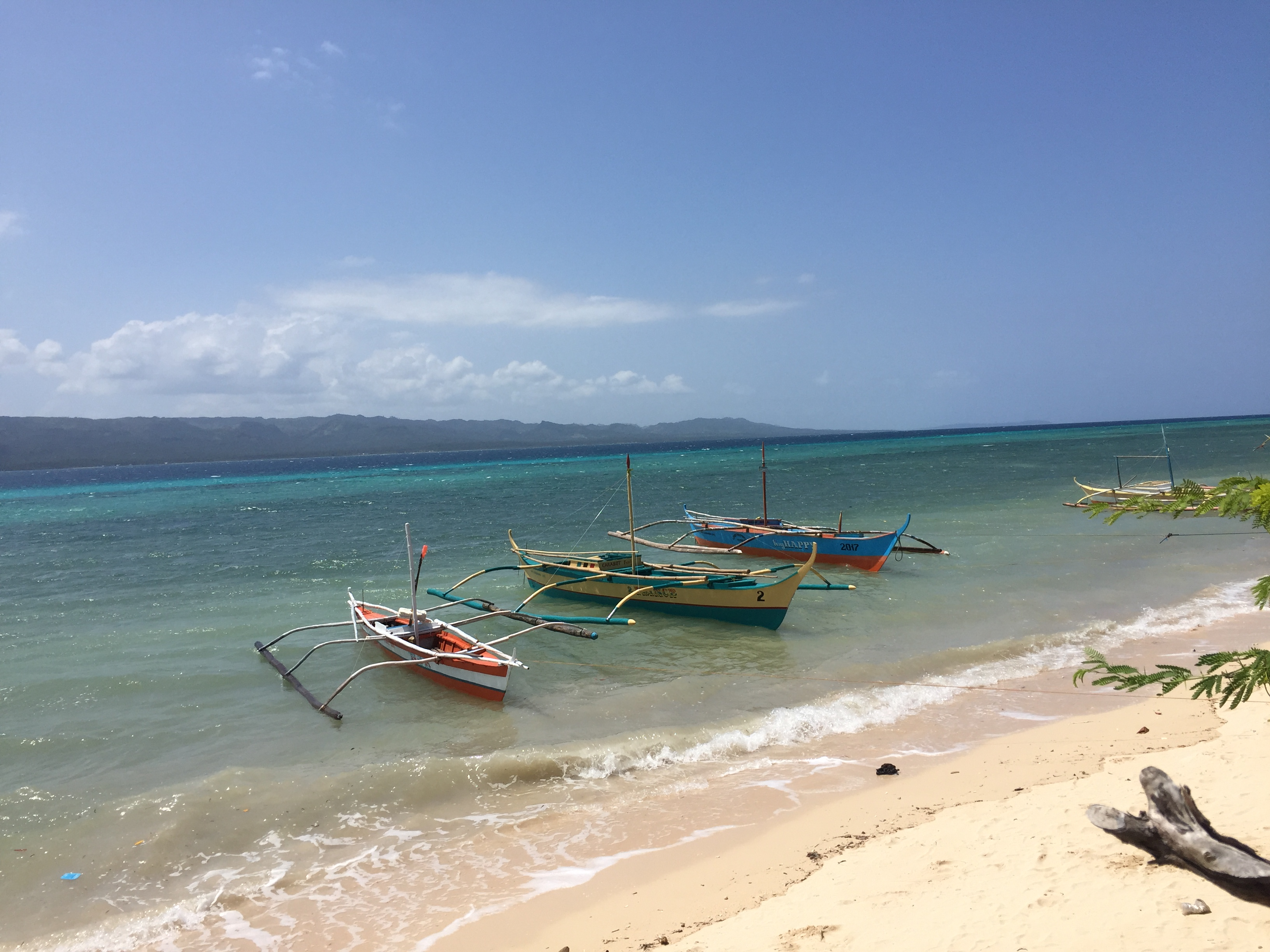
- Alibijaban Island

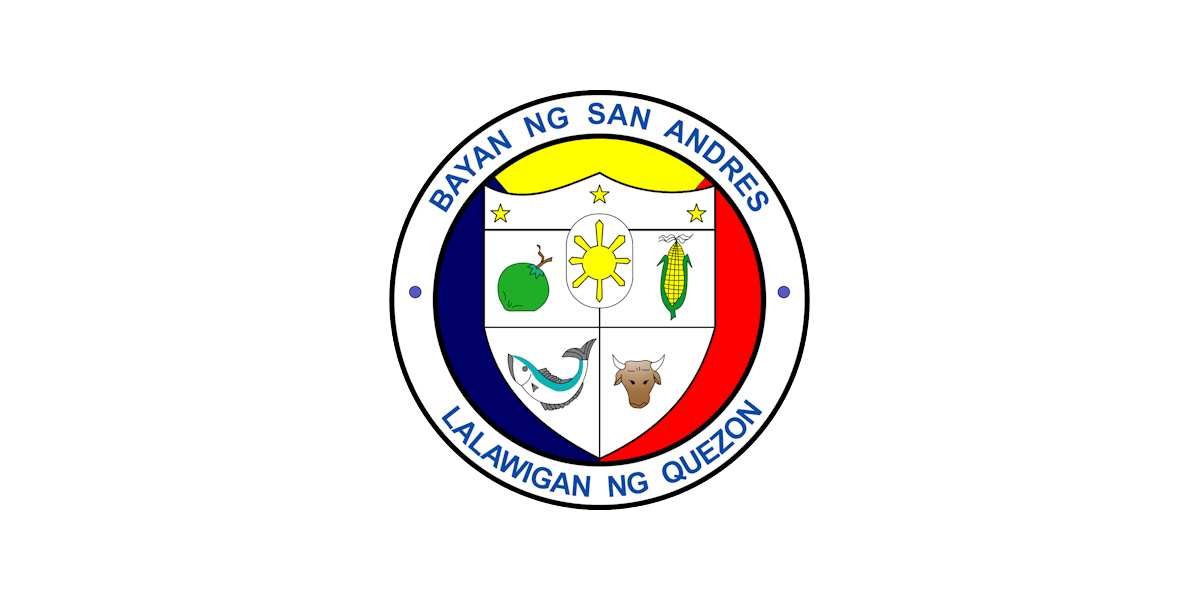
- Flag Seal

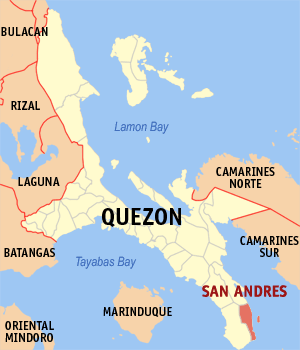
- Map of Quezon with San Andres highlighted
- Interactive map of San Andres
- Location within the Philippines
- Coordinates: 13°19′23″N 122°40′34″E
- Country: Philippines
- Region: Calabarzon
- Province: Quezon
- District: 3rd district
- Founded: August 20, 1959
- Conversion to municipality: July 1, 1963
- Named for: Andrew the Apostle
- Barangays: 7 (see Barangays)

Government
  - Type: Sangguniang Bayan
  - Mayor: Ralph Edward B. Lim
  - Vice Mayor: Nelson Ausa
  - Representative: Reynante U. Arrogancia
  - Municipal Council: Members: Rahzes Casey C. Villanueva; Khirk L. Banquiles; Teddy B. Tan; Sonny P. Luzares; Edgar M. Lingahan; Nelson P. Villanueva; Dondon M. Ludovice; Esperanza M. Fontanil
  - Electorate: 20,537 voters (2025)

Area
  - Total: 172.93 km^{2} (66.77 sq mi)
- Elevation: 84 m (276 ft)
- Highest elevation: 405 m (1,329 ft)
- Lowest elevation: 0 m (0 ft)

Population (2024 census)
  - Total: 38,407
  - Density: 222.10/km^{2} (575.23/sq mi)
  - Households: 9,199
- Demonym: San Andresin

Economy
  - Income class: 2nd municipal income class
  - Poverty incidence: 12.31% (2023)
  - Revenue: ₱ 193.1 million (2024)
  - Assets: ₱ 857.4 million (2024)
  - Expenditure: ₱ 175.1 million (2024)
  - Liabilities: ₱ 131.7 million (2024)

Service provider
  - Electricity: Quezon 1 Electric Cooperative (QUEZELCO 1)
- Time zone: UTC+8 (PST)
- ZIP code: 4314
- PSGC: 0405640000
- IDD : area code: +63 (0)42
- Native languages: Tagalog

San Andres, officially the Municipality of San Andres (Tagalog: Bayan ng San Andres; Cebuano: Lungsod sa San Andres), is a municipality in the province of Quezon, Philippines. According to the 2024 census, it has a population of 38,407 people.

== History ==
President Carlos P. Garcia issued Executive Order (EO) No. 353 on August 20, 1959, wherein six barrios of San Narciso were organized into the municipal district of San Andres. His successor, Diosdado Macapagal, retroactively declared the political unit a municipality on October 5, 1965, through EO No. 357, taking effect from July 1, 1963.

In March 1973, San Andres was close to the epicenter of a magnitude 7.4 earthquake. The town suffered unknown fatalities and damage to almost 1,000 homes.

== Geography ==
San Andres is 237 kilometers (147 mi) from Lucena and 367 kilometers (228 mi) from Manila. Administratively, the town of San Andres is subdivided into seven barangays. Poblacion forms the center, whereas the other six are in the outlying areas which are several kilometres away from the center of the municipality. The municipality also includes the island barangay of Alibijaban in Ragay Gulf.

=== Barangays ===
San Andres is politically subdivided into 7 barangays, as indicated below. Each barangay consists of puroks and some have sitios.

- Alibihaban
- Camflora
- Mangero
- Pansoy
- Tala
- Talisay
- Poblacion

=== Climate ===
Climate data for San Andres, Quezon
Month	Jan	Feb	Mar	Apr	May	Jun	Jul	Aug	Sep	Oct	Nov	Dec	Year
Mean daily maximum °C (°F)	27 (81)	28 (82)	29 (84)	31 (88)	31 (88)	30 (86)	29 (84)	29 (84)	29 (84)	29 (84)	29 (84)	28 (82)	29 (84)
Mean daily minimum °C (°F)	22 (72)	22 (72)	22 (72)	24 (75)	25 (77)	25 (77)	25 (77)	25 (77)	25 (77)	24 (75)	24 (75)	23 (73)	24 (75)
Average precipitation mm (inches)	55 (2.2)	36 (1.4)	45 (1.8)	42 (1.7)	114 (4.5)	184 (7.2)	245 (9.6)	224 (8.8)	238 (9.4)	171 (6.7)	130 (5.1)	94 (3.7)	1,578 (62.1)
Average rainy days	13.0	9.5	11.8	12.7	21.3	25.3	28.3	26.5	26.4	24.2	19.9	16.1	235
Source: Meteoblue

== Demographics ==
Population census of San Andres
Year	Pop.	±% p.a.
1960	2,815	—
1970	9,571	+13.00%
1975	15,956	+10.79%
1980	17,822	+2.24%
1990	23,716	+2.90%
1995	25,948	+1.70%
2000	27,184	+1.00%
2007	29,216	+1.00%
2010	33,586	+5.20%
2015	35,780	+1.21%
2020	37,454	+0.97%
2024	38,407	+0.61%
Source: Philippine Statistics Authority

A main language spoken in San Andres is Tagalog, which is spoken with a dialect that is spoken in Marinduque and eastern Oriental Mindoro. However, a significant minority spoke Cebuano, spoken in some remote areas of the municipality by ethnic Cebuano-speaking people from Masbate (in turn descended from settlers mainly from Cebu) who settled in San Andres several decades ago.

== Economy ==
Poverty incidence of San Andres (%)

Source: Philippine Statistics Authority

== Churches ==
- San Andrés Apóstol Parish - Poblacion

== Education ==
The San Andres Schools District Office governs all educational institutions within the municipality. It oversees the management and operations of all private and public, from primary to secondary schools.

=== Primary and elementary schools ===
- Alibahaban Elementary School
- Banaba Elementary School
- Camflora Elementary School
- Camflora Elementary School- Annex
- Educator's Clinic for Early Learners
- Inanuran Elementary School
- Mangero Elementary School
- Pansoy Elementary School
- San Andres Central Elementary School
- Sanctus Andreas Parochial School
- Segaras Elementary School
- Tala Elementary School
- Talisay Elementary School
- Tamnao Elementary School
- Yugno Elementary School

=== Secondary schools ===
- Camflora National High School
- Camflora National High School (Annex)
