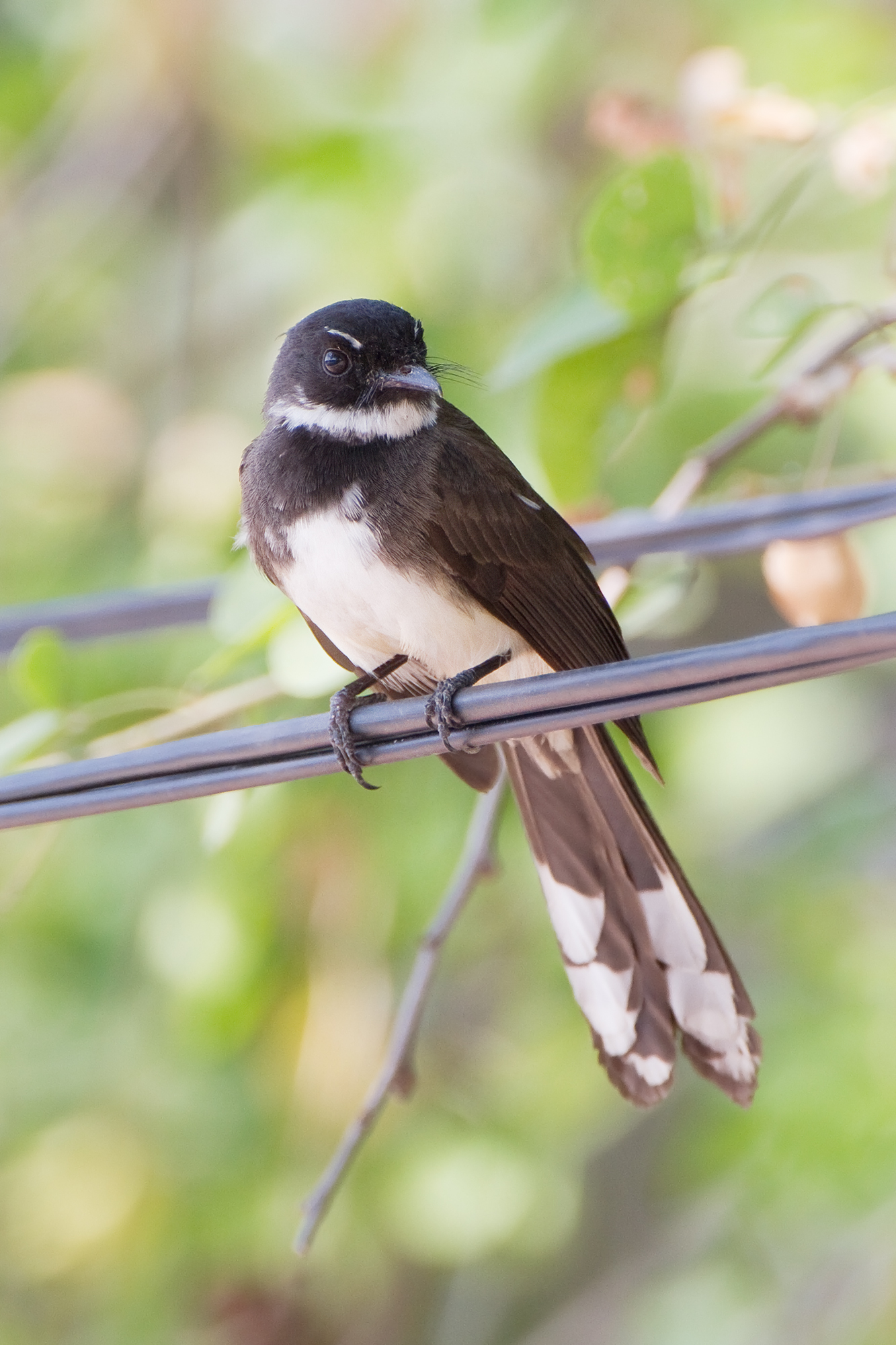

Conservation status
- Least Concern (IUCN 3.1)

Scientific classification
- Kingdom: Animalia
- Phylum: Chordata
- Class: Aves
- Order: Passeriformes
- Family: Rhipiduridae
- Genus: Rhipidura
- Species: R. javanica

Binomial name
- Rhipidura javanica (Sparrman, 1788)

= Sunda pied fantail =

Species of bird

The Sunda pied fantail (Rhipidura javanica), also known as the Malaysian pied fantail, is a species of bird in the fantail family. It is locally referred to as murai gila, literally "crazy thrush" in the Malay language. It was previously considered conspecific with the Philippine pied fantail.

== Distribution and habitat ==
It is found in Brunei, Cambodia, Indonesia, Laos, Malaysia, Myanmar, Singapore, Thailand, and Vietnam. It inhabits a wide variety of forest and scrub, including parks, agricultural lands, and other degraded habitat. It resides in lowland areas, sometimes up to 800m in elevation, and is usually found near water.

== Behavior ==
The Sunda pied fantail eats insects caught on the wing. It often joins mixed feeding flocks with other insectivorous birds, and will sometimes follow large mammals to eat insects stirred up by their movement.

It breeds from January to August, varying across its range. It constructs a cup nest from fibers and grasses held together with spiderweb.

It is not known to migrate.

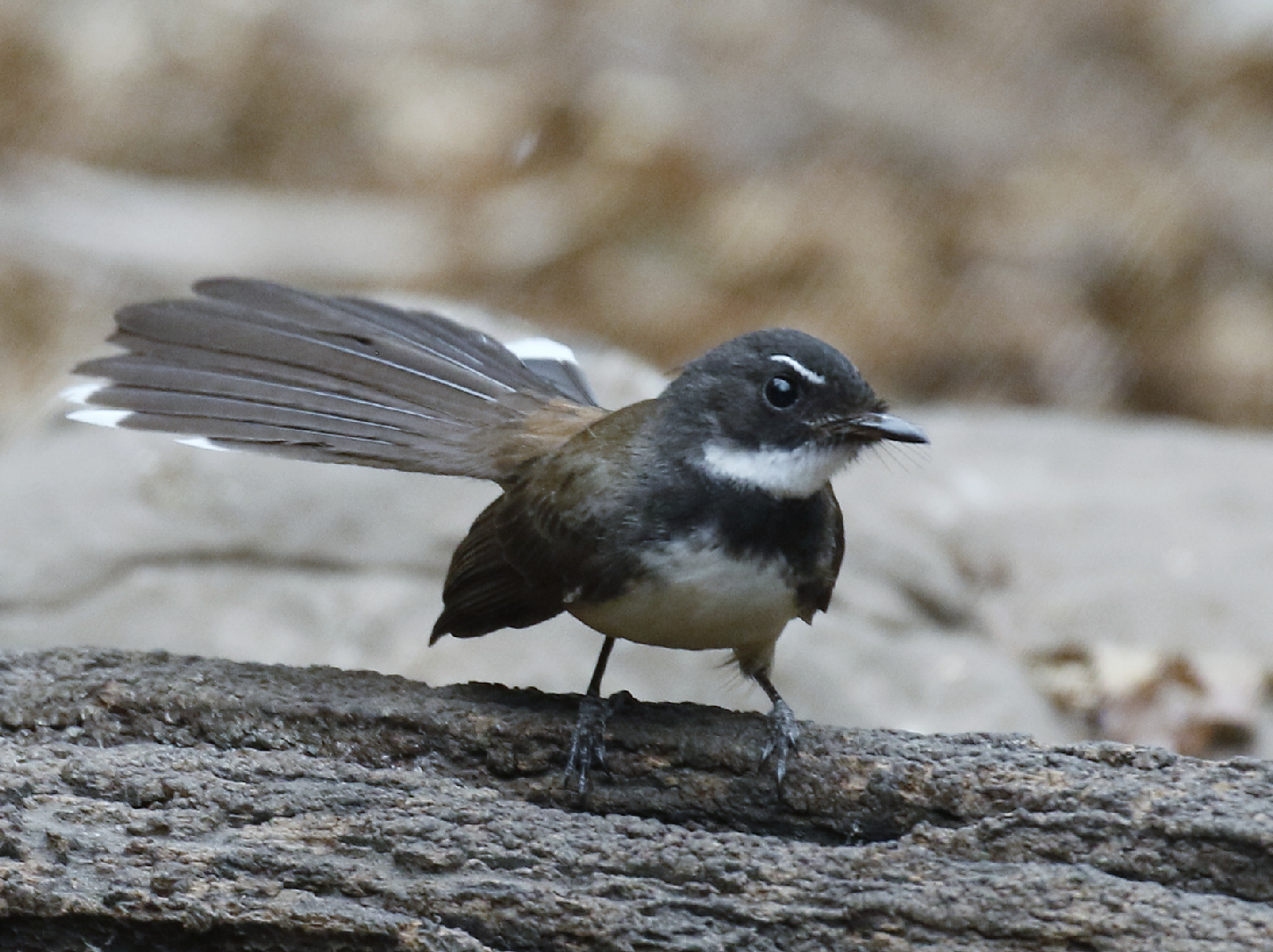
showing fanned tail (topside)

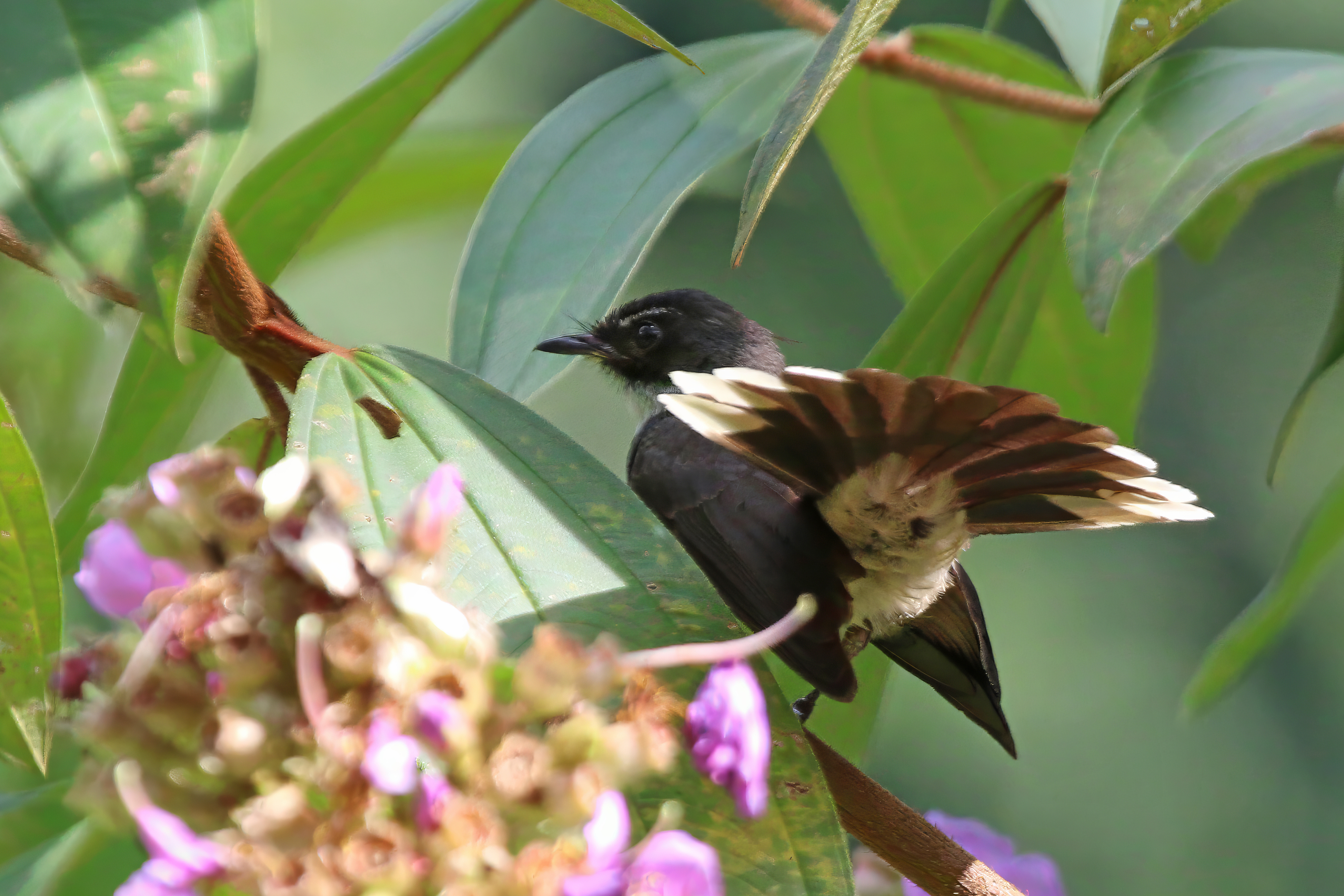
showing fanned tail (underside)

== Conservation ==
The IUCN considers the Sunda pied fantail of Least Concern because of its wide geographic range and large, stable population.
