= Buenavista, Quezon =

Municipality in Quezon, Philippines

Buenavista Piris
- Municipality
- Municipality of Buenavista
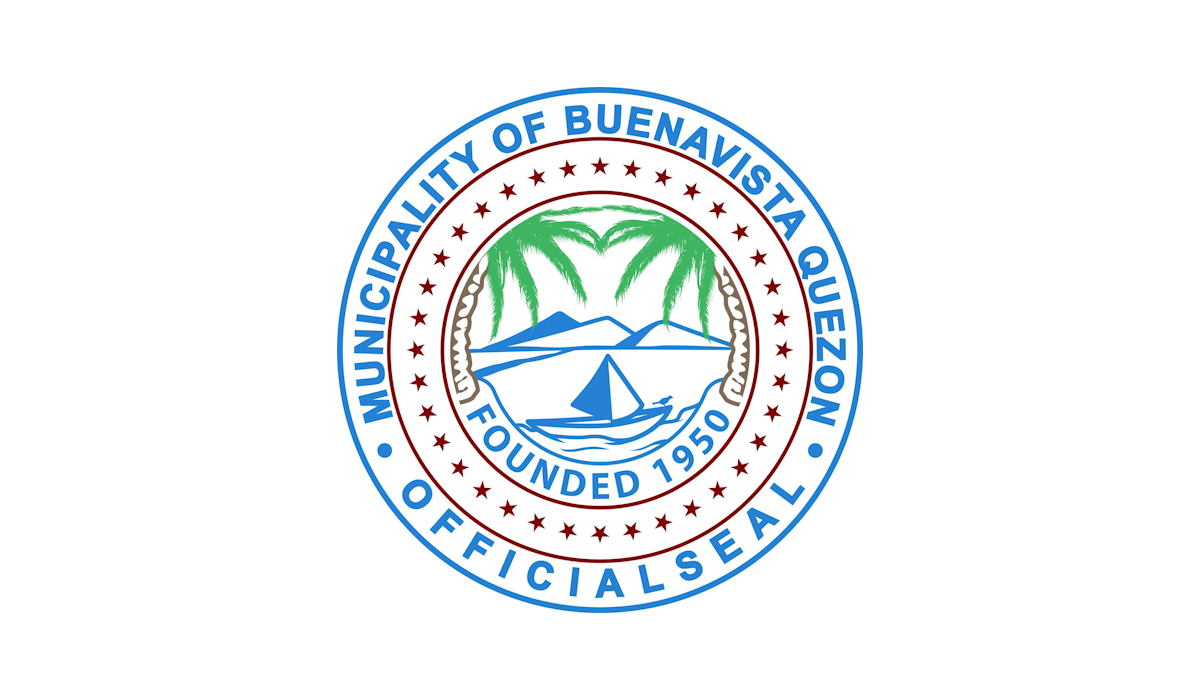
- Flag Seal
- Etymology: Beautiful View
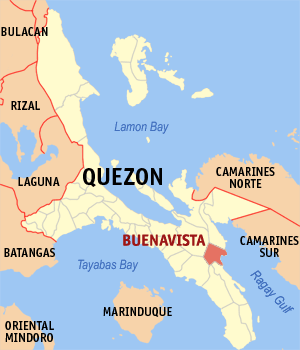
- Map of Quezon with Buenavista highlighted
- Interactive map of Buenavista
- Location within the Philippines
- Coordinates: 13°44′22″N 122°28′03″E
- Country: Philippines
- Region: Calabarzon
- Province: Quezon
- District: 3rd district
- Established: August 26, 1950
- Barangays: 37 (see Barangays)

Government
  - Type: Sangguniang Bayan
  - Mayor: Reynaldo E. Rosilla, Jr.
  - Vice Mayor: Alvin Ray U. Rivera
  - Representative: Reynante U. Arrogancia
  - Municipal Council: Members: Engr. Marianito V. Barolo; Remedios A. Osillo; Joseph Doruelo; Francisco Noblefranca; Saturnino U. Loayon Jr.; Lowell L. Cleope; Benzon M. Edrad; Denzdy Ai Ai R. Tan
  - Electorate: 22,993 voters (2025)

Area
  - Total: 161.35 km^{2} (62.30 sq mi)
- Elevation: 72 m (236 ft)
- Highest elevation: 332 m (1,089 ft)
- Lowest elevation: 0 m (0 ft)

Population (2024 census)
  - Total: 31,550
  - Density: 195.5/km^{2} (506.4/sq mi)
  - Households: 7,629
- Demonym: Buenavistahin

Economy
  - Income class: 2nd municipal income class
  - Poverty incidence: 11.62% (2023)
  - Revenue: ₱ 173.8 million (2024)
  - Assets: ₱ 69.45 million (2024)
  - Expenditure: ₱ 55.06 million (2024)
  - Liabilities: ₱ 84.23 million (2024)

Service provider
  - Electricity: Quezon 1 Electric Cooperative (QUEZELCO 1)
- Time zone: UTC+8 (PST)
- ZIP code: 4320
- PSGC: 0405605000
- IDD : area code: +63 (0)42
- Native languages: Tagalog
- Major religions: Roman Catholic
- Website: https://www.buenavistaquezon.com/

Buenavista, officially the Municipality of Buenavista (Tagalog: Bayan ng Buenavista), is a municipality in the province of Quezon, Philippines. According to the 2024 census, it has a population of 31,550 people.

It was formerly known as Piris. The town is accessible by land via Lopez and Catanauan or by water transportation via Guinayangan from Lucena City.

== Etymology ==
Formerly known as Piris, Buenavista is now its official name from the Spanish words buena vista, which translates to good view, nice view, fair view, beautiful view, or good sight in the English language.

== History ==
=== Origin ===
Its original name was Piri as engraved in the oldest church bell which was donated by one Don Jose Casal in the year 1866. It used to be located in the Sitio of Pinagbayanan situated in the western side of the Piris River which is about one a half kilometers away from the present town site. It was a mere hamlet of the municipality of Guinanyagan, province of Quezon and remained as such for quite a number of years until it finally became a municipality.

This place became the choice of the founders, who were a mixture of Bicolanos and Visayans to enable them to easily escape the Moro raids that were prevalent during the olden times. When the raids finally subsided, the barrio of Piris was transferred to its present location. The word Piri was changed to Piris and later re-changed to Piris.

=== Separation as a town ===
In October 1936, some civic minded residents launched the proposition of making the place a municipality. They signed a petition for the separation of Piris from the municipality of Guinayangan. A group of seven members was formed and was commissioned to undertake a delegation to the Office of the Secretary of the Interior for the purpose. The group was composed of Don Feliciano Roldan, Mariano San Jose, Honorio Hutamares, Teodorico Dosto, Ciriaco Parraba, Antonio Pasta and Francisco San Jose. The outbreak of the second global war marked the failure of the offices concerned to convert the place into a regular municipality.

After the election of Gaudencio Vera as representative for the second district of Quezon, Francisco San Jose, a native and public teacher of the place, was instructed by Vera to help prepare the necessary papers pertaining to the separation of Piris from Guinayangan. When the papers were prepared, House Bill No. 83 was passed by both houses of Congress and became Republic Act No. 495 under Proclamation No. 201 by President Elpidio Quirino, the corporate existence of Piris in the name Buenavista, the 37th municipality of Quezon, was fixed on August 26, 1950. An inauguration was celebrated by the town people under the leadership of Domingo Reyes and Yao Ching Kio, wealthy businessman of the place, with Congressman Vera as the guest of honor.

When the municipality of Buenavista was inaugurated on August 26, 1950, it belonged to the seventh class. Six months later, duan some increase in revenue, it rose to sixth class. Francisco Falqueza was appointed Municipal Mayor and held office beginning August 26, 1950, up to December 31, 1951, and on November 13, 1951, in a local election, Primitivo Pasta Sr. becoming the first elected mayor.

== Geography ==
Buenavista is located in the eastern part of Quezon at the base of the Bondoc Peninsula. It is bounded on the northern part by Guinayangan, on the south by the town of San Narciso, on the western part by Lopez and Catanauan, and on the east by Ragay Gulf facing Bicol Region. The municipality is 336 kilometers (209 mi) southeast of Metro Manila and 206 kilometers (128 mi) southeast of provincial capital Lucena.

=== Barangays ===
Buenavista is politically subdivided into 37 barangays, as indicated below. Each barangay consists of puroks and some have sitios.

- Bagong Silang
- Batabat Norte
- Batabat Sur
- Buenavista
- Bukal
- Bulo
- Cabong
- Cadlit
- Catulin
- Cawa
- De La Paz
- Del Rosario
- Hagonghong
- Ibabang Wasay
- Ilayang Wasay
- Lilukin
- Mabini
- Mabutag
- Magallanes
- Maligaya (Esperanza)
- Manlana
- Masaya
- Poblacion
- Rizal
- Sabang Pinamasagan
- Sabang Piris
- San Diego
- San Isidro Ibaba
- San Isidro Ilaya
- San Pablo
- San Pedro (Villa Rodrigo)
- San Vicente
- Siain
- Villa Aurora
- Villa Batabat
- Villa Magsaysay
- Villa Veronica

=== Topography ===
Buenavista is primarily upland municipality characterized by ragged terrain, generally hilly or mountainous with high plains, valleys and swamps. It lies on different slopes from 0-15% and above. There are three types of soil that covers the municipality. These are Faraon Clay, Catanauan Clay loam and Bolinao Clay loam. This is the most extensive upland soil of the province mostly found in Bondoc Peninsula. Faraon Clay loam covers about 13,133.75 hectares (32,454.2 acres) which is 85% of the total land area of the municipality, 10% is said to be Catanauan Clay loam and 5% of the total land area in Bolinao Clay loam. The greater portion of the soil types is used for grazing. The low-lying hills are planted to coconut and seasonal crops like corn, root crops, and fruit bearing trees.

Catanauan Clay loam is found in the valley is used mostly on paddy rice field, while Bolinao Clay loam is devoted to coconut, bananas and other crops and some part has a mineral deposit like in Barangay Bulo and Cadlit.

=== Climate ===
Climate data for Buevavista, Quezon
Month	Jan	Feb	Mar	Apr	May	Jun	Jul	Aug	Sep	Oct	Nov	Dec	Year
Mean daily maximum °C (°F)	27 (81)	28 (82)	30 (86)	31 (88)	31 (88)	30 (86)	29 (84)	29 (84)	29 (84)	29 (84)	29 (84)	28 (82)	29 (84)
Mean daily minimum °C (°F)	21 (70)	21 (70)	22 (72)	23 (73)	25 (77)	25 (77)	25 (77)	25 (77)	24 (75)	24 (75)	23 (73)	22 (72)	23 (74)
Average precipitation mm (inches)	31 (1.2)	23 (0.9)	25 (1.0)	30 (1.2)	85 (3.3)	145 (5.7)	182 (7.2)	153 (6.0)	172 (6.8)	150 (5.9)	113 (4.4)	68 (2.7)	1,177 (46.3)
Average rainy days	11.3	8.5	9.7	11.3	18.3	23.2	26.6	25.4	25.9	24.2	19.7	15.2	219.3
Source: Meteoblue

Its climate is classified as type 3 which means the rainfall is evenly distributed throughout the year.

== Demographics ==
Population census of Buenavista
Year	Pop.	±% p.a.
1960	6,438	—
1970	12,987	+7.26%
1975	14,462	+2.18%
1980	16,246	+2.35%
1990	20,060	+2.13%
1995	21,376	+1.20%
2000	22,840	+1.43%
2007	24,798	+1.14%
2010	29,053	+5.93%
2015	30,047	+0.64%
2020	31,160	+0.77%
2024	31,550	+0.30%
Source: Philippine Statistics Authority

=== Languages ===
The main language is Tagalog, although the Bicolanos, Visayan and Ilocano languages are commonly used in the barangays.

=== Religions ===
There religious organizations in the town such as: Roman Catholic, Iglesia Ni Cristo, Church of God, Seventh-Day Adventist, Born Again, Members Church of God International, Baptist, Islam, and Jehovah's Witnesses.

== Economy ==
Poverty incidence of Buenavista (%)

Source: Philippine Statistics Authority

== Government ==
=== List of former chief executives ===
- Francisco Falqueza (appointed) Aug.26, 1950–Dec.31, 1951
- Primitivo Pasta Sr. (first elected Mayor) 1951–1955
- Eustaquio Cawa 1955–1963
- Domingo Reyes 1963-1986
- Edgardo San Juan (elected Vice Mayor acted as OIC-mayor early 1982–1986)
- Alex Ang (OIC-Mayor) 1986-1988
- Vicente Cawa 1988-1995
- Florencio Villamater 1995-2001
- Ramon Reyes 2001-2007
- Ma. Remedios Rivera 2007-2016
- Alexander Rivera 2016–2019
- Ma. Remedious Rivera 2019–2022

== Education ==
The Buenavista Schools District Office governs all educational institutions within the municipality. It oversees the management and operations of all private and public, from primary to secondary schools.

=== Primary and elementary schools ===
- Bagong Silang Elementary School
- Batabat Elementary School
- Buenavista Central Elementary School
- Bukal Elementary School
- Cabong Elementary School
- De La Paz Elementary School
- Del Rosario Elementary School
- Esperanza Elementary School
- Hagonghong Elementary School
- Mabutag Elementary School
- Magallanes Elementary School
- Masaya Primary School
- Sabang Primary School
- San Diego Elementary School
- San Isidro Ibaba Elementary School
- San Isidro Ilaya Elementary School
- San Pedro Elementary School
- San Vicente Elementary School
- Siain Elementary School
- St. Lucille Child Development Center
- Villa Aurora Elementary School
- Villa Magsaysay Elementary School
- Villa Veronica Elementary School

=== Secondary schools ===
- Buenavista National High School
- Cabong National High School
- Hagonghong Integrated High School
- Maligaya National High School
- San Pedro National High School
- Saint Lawrence Academy, inc.

== Churches ==
- San Lorenzo Diácono Parish - Poblacion
- Peninsula Bible Baptist Mission
- Iglesia Ni Cristo - Local Congregation of Bagong Silang
- Iglesia Ni Cristo - Local Congregation of Buenavista
- Seventh-day Adventist Church - Buenavista, Quezon

== Notable personalities ==
- Alice Dixson - actress & model
