= San Narciso, Quezon =

Municipality in Quezon, Philippines

San Narciso
- Municipality
- Municipality of San Narciso
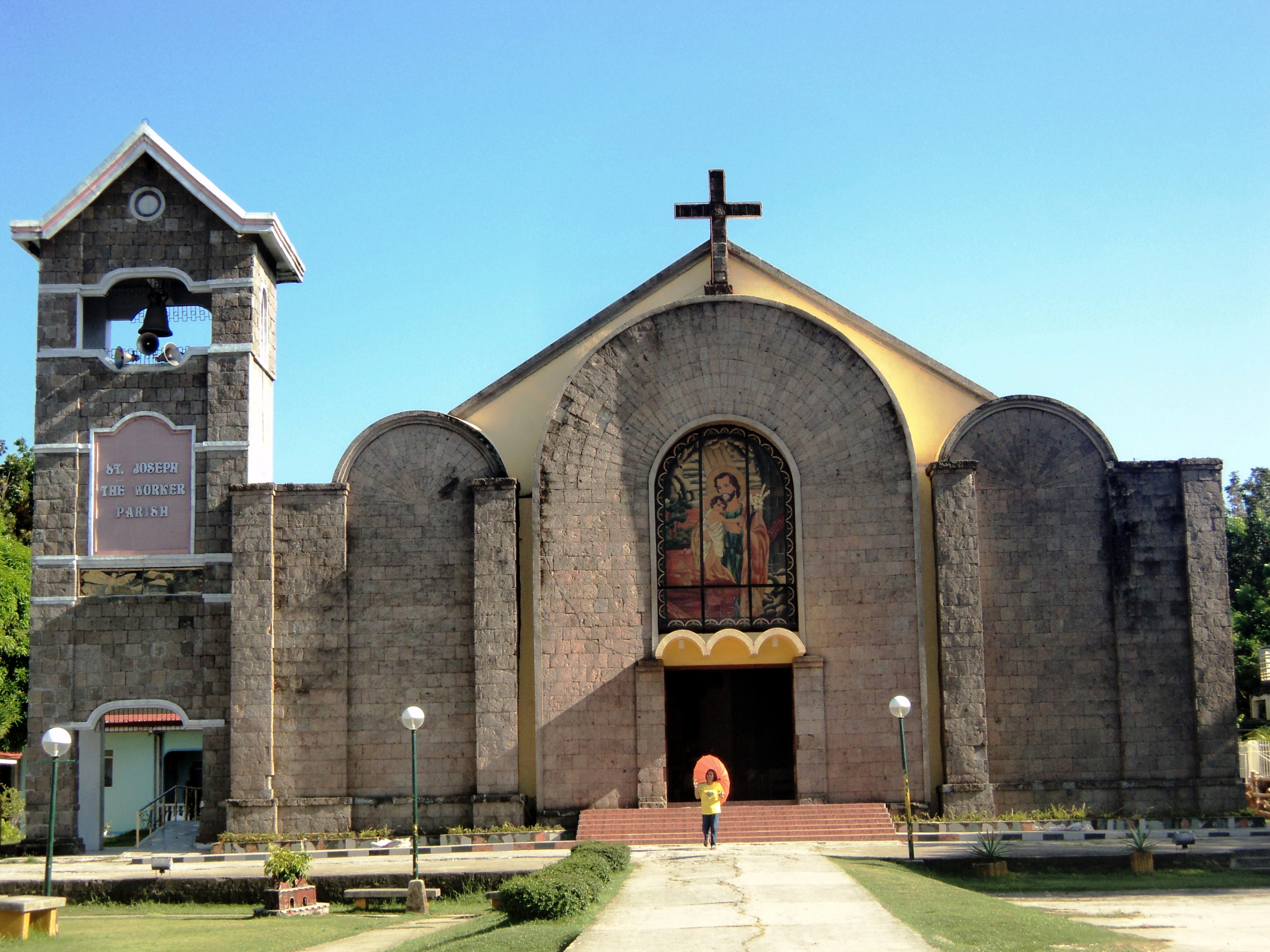
- St. Joseph the Worker Parish Church

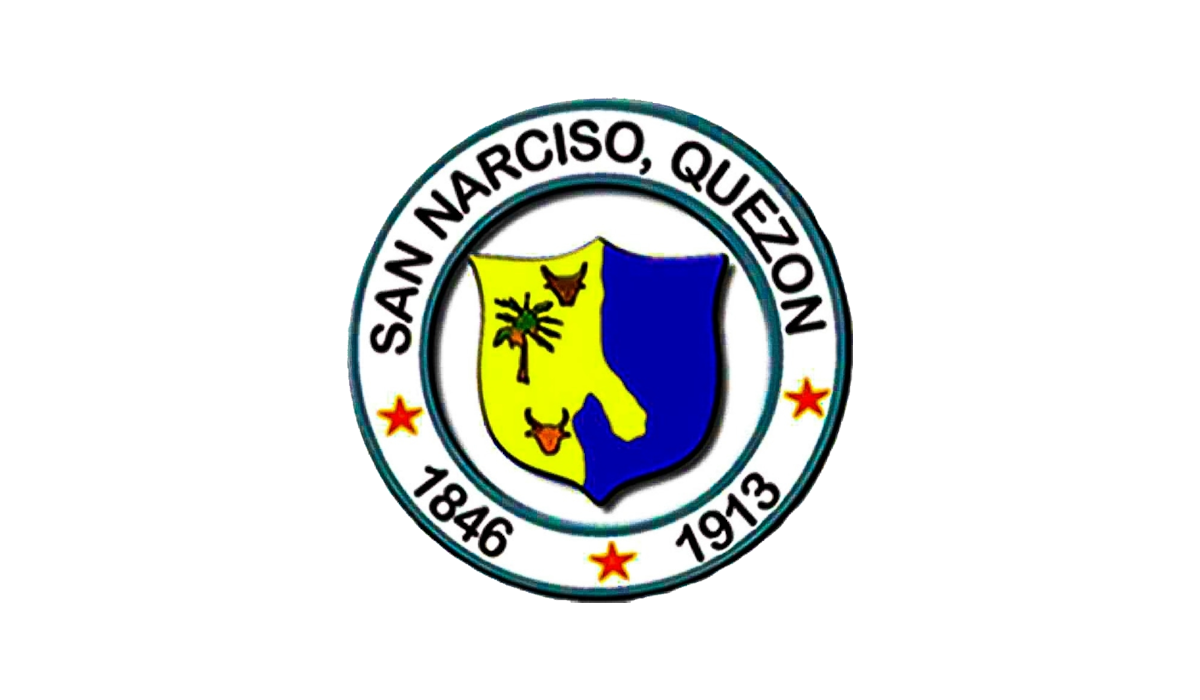
- Flag

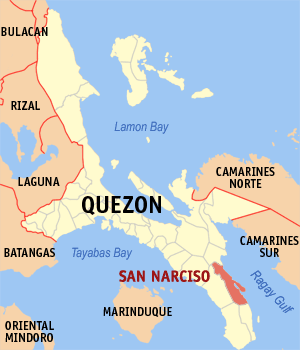
- Map of Quezon with San Narciso highlighted
- Interactive map of San Narciso
- Location within the Philippines
- Coordinates: 13°34′04″N 122°34′00″E
- Country: Philippines
- Region: Calabarzon
- Province: Quezon
- District: 3rd district
- Founded: February 2, 1846
- Annexation to Mulanay: October 23, 1903
- Chartered: 1913
- Named for: Narciso Clavería y Zaldúa
- Barangays: 24 (see Barangays)

Government
  - Type: Sangguniang Bayan
  - Mayor: Florabelle U. Uy-Yap
  - Vice Mayor: Elena R. Babao
  - Representative: Reynante U. Arrogancia
  - Municipal Council: Members: Margarita Victoria U. Esguerra; Vivien Mhel A. Carabido; Khaey Mariz R. Medenilla; Alexander R. Sonbise; Juanita M. Veluz; Bienvinito A. Maxino Jr.; Marlon R. Sevilla; Romeo F. Fontamillas Jr.
  - Electorate: 33,152 voters (2025)

Area
  - Total: 263.58 km^{2} (101.77 sq mi)
- Elevation: 51 m (167 ft)
- Highest elevation: 305 m (1,001 ft)
- Lowest elevation: 0 m (0 ft)

Population (2024 census)
  - Total: 53,375
  - Density: 202.50/km^{2} (524.47/sq mi)
  - Households: 12,199
- Demonym: San Narcisohin

Economy
  - Income class: 1st municipal income class
  - Poverty incidence: 17.83% (2023)
  - Revenue: ₱ 274.8 million (2024)
  - Assets: ₱ 948 million (2024)
  - Expenditure: ₱ 95.53 million (2024)
  - Liabilities: ₱ 85.46 million (2024)

Service provider
  - Electricity: Quezon 1 Electric Cooperative (QUEZELCO 1)
- Time zone: UTC+8 (PST)
- ZIP code: 4313
- PSGC: 0405644000
- IDD : area code: +63 (0)42
- Native languages: Tagalog
- Website: www.sannarcisoquezon.gov.ph

San Narciso, officially the Municipality of San Narciso (Tagalog: Bayan ng San Narciso), is a 1st class municipality in the province of Quezon, Philippines. According to the 2024 census, it has a population of 53,375 people.

== History ==
San Narciso was founded in 1846, during the Spanish colonial period of the Philippines, by Governor-General Narciso Clavería y Zaldúa, following his official visit to the eastern coast of the Bondoc Peninsula. Upon discovering the three sparsely populated and poorly situated villages of Abuyon, Maayas, and Sugbungkugon, Claveria conferred with the cabezas de barangay to propose consolidating these communities into a single site. The inhabitants agreed to the proposal and named the new town San Narciso in honor of Claveria.

From 1903 to 1912, during th American colonial period of the Philippines, San Narciso was merged with Mulanay.

On August 20, 1959, barrios Alibijaban, Camplora, Mangero, Pansoy, San Andres, and Tala were separated from San Narciso to form the municipal district of San Andres, by virtue of Executive Order (EO) No. 353 under President Carlos P. Garcia.

== Geography ==
San Narciso is 178 kilometers (111 mi) from Lucena and 308 kilometers (191 mi) from Manila.

=== Barangays ===
San Narciso has 24 barangays, as indicated below. Each barangay consists of puroks and some have sitios.

- Abuyon
- Andres Bonifacio
- Bani
- Binay
- Buenavista
- Busokbusokan
- Calwit
- Guinhalinan
- Lakdayan
- Maguiting
- Manlampong
- Pagkakaisa (Poblacion)
- Maligaya (Poblacion)
- Bayanihan (Poblacion)
- Pagdadamayan (Poblacion)
- Punta
- Rizal
- San Isidro
- San Juan
- San Vicente
- Vigo Central
- Villa Aurin (Pinagsama)
- Villa Reyes
- White Cliff

=== Climate ===
Climate data for San Narciso, Quezon
Month	Jan	Feb	Mar	Apr	May	Jun	Jul	Aug	Sep	Oct	Nov	Dec	Year
Mean daily maximum °C (°F)	27 (81)	28 (82)	30 (86)	31 (88)	31 (88)	30 (86)	29 (84)	29 (84)	29 (84)	29 (84)	29 (84)	28 (82)	29 (84)
Mean daily minimum °C (°F)	21 (70)	21 (70)	22 (72)	23 (73)	25 (77)	25 (77)	25 (77)	25 (77)	24 (75)	24 (75)	23 (73)	22 (72)	23 (74)
Average precipitation mm (inches)	31 (1.2)	23 (0.9)	25 (1.0)	30 (1.2)	85 (3.3)	145 (5.7)	182 (7.2)	153 (6.0)	172 (6.8)	150 (5.9)	113 (4.4)	68 (2.7)	1,177 (46.3)
Average rainy days	11.3	8.5	9.7	11.3	18.3	23.2	26.6	25.4	25.9	24.2	19.7	15.2	219.3
Source: Meteoblue

== Demographics ==
Population census of San Narciso
Year	Pop.	±% p.a.
1903	2,501	—
1918	2,752	+0.64%
1939	5,683	+3.51%
1948	7,006	+2.35%
1960	7,877	+0.98%
1970	17,876	+8.53%
1975	24,556	+6.57%
1980	28,958	+3.35%
1990	33,025	+1.32%
1995	36,535	+1.91%
2000	38,474	+1.11%
2007	39,828	+0.48%
2010	45,386	+4.87%
2015	48,461	+1.26%
2020	51,058	+1.10%
2024	53,375	+1.07%
Source: Philippine Statistics Authority

== Economy ==
Poverty incidence of San Narciso (%)

Source: Philippine Statistics Authority

== Churches ==
- San José Obrero Parish - Poblacion (est. 1846)
- Nuestra Señora de la Paz y Buen Viaje Parish - Abuyon (est. 1994)

== Education ==
The San Narciso Schools District Office governs all educational institutions within the municipality. It oversees the management and operations of all private and public, from primary to secondary schools.

=== Primary and elementary schools ===
- Abuyon Elementary School
- Bangkuro Elementary School
- Bani Elementary School
- Binay Elementary School
- Busokbusokan Elementary School
- Calwit Elementary School
- Guinhalinan Elementary School
- Lakdayan Elementary School
- Maguiting Elementary School
- Nangka Elementary School
- Our Lady of Peace Parochial School of Abuyon
- Pinagsama Elementary School
- Punta Elementary School
- Rizal Elementary School
- San Isidro Elementary School
- San Juan Elementary School
- San Narciso Central Elementary School
- San Vicente Elementary School
- St. Joseph Parochial School
- Vigo Central Elementary School
- VIlla Reyes Elementary School
- White Cliff Elementary School

=== Secondary schools ===
- Abuyon National High School
- Abuyon National High School (Doña Salud Annex)
- Gregorio Reyes National High School
- Godofredo M. Tan Memorial Integrated School of Arts and Trades
- White Cliff National High School
- St. Joseph's High School
