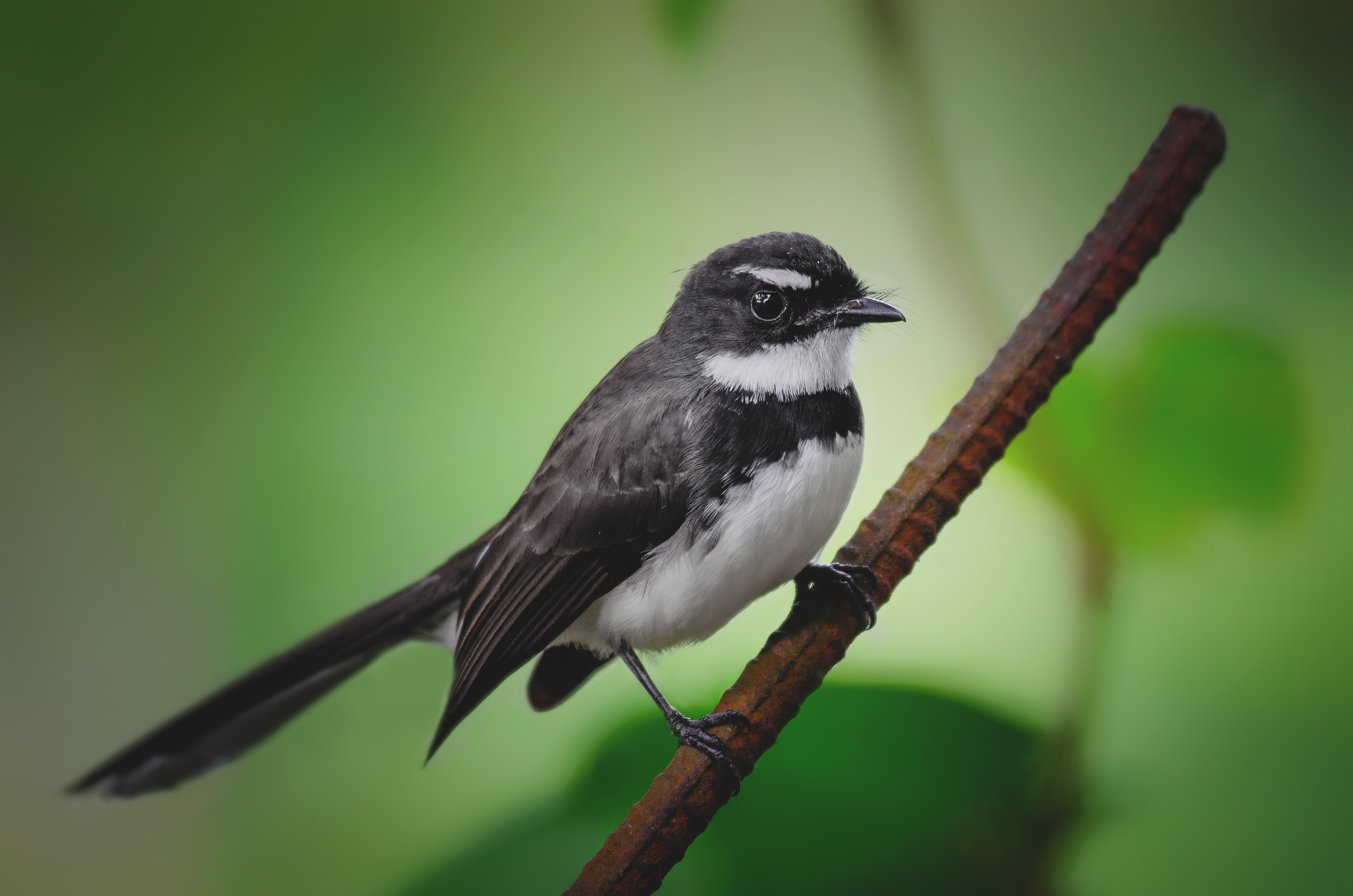

Conservation status
- Least Concern (IUCN 3.1)

Scientific classification
- Kingdom: Animalia
- Phylum: Chordata
- Class: Aves
- Order: Passeriformes
- Family: Rhipiduridae
- Genus: Rhipidura
- Species: R. nigritorquis

Binomial name
- Rhipidura nigritorquis Vigors, 1831

Audio
- Song

= Philippine pied fantail =

Species of bird

The Philippine pied fantail (Rhipidura nigritorquis) is a medium-size species of bird in the family Rhipiduridae endemic to the Philippines. It was formerly considered conspecific with the Malaysian pied fantail.

== Description and taxonomy ==
This bird is of moderate size and has a long tail. It is commonly found in wooded areas and open spaces in lowland regions. Its upper body is a sooty gray color, while its underbody is white. It features a black band on its chest and a black face, with a distinct white throat and brow. It frequently moves its tail from side to side, displaying its white tips. The bird's song is composed of diverse, somewhat unmusical, and scratchy whistled phrases.

Other names by which this bird is referred to are Maria Capra (Philippines), Lawlawigan (Northern Luzon, Philippines), and tarerekoy (Visayas, Philippines).

It differs from the Oriental magpie-robin with its white belly, all black tail, paler gray throat and breast in female, smaller size especially its bill and wing. It also considerably differs vocally.

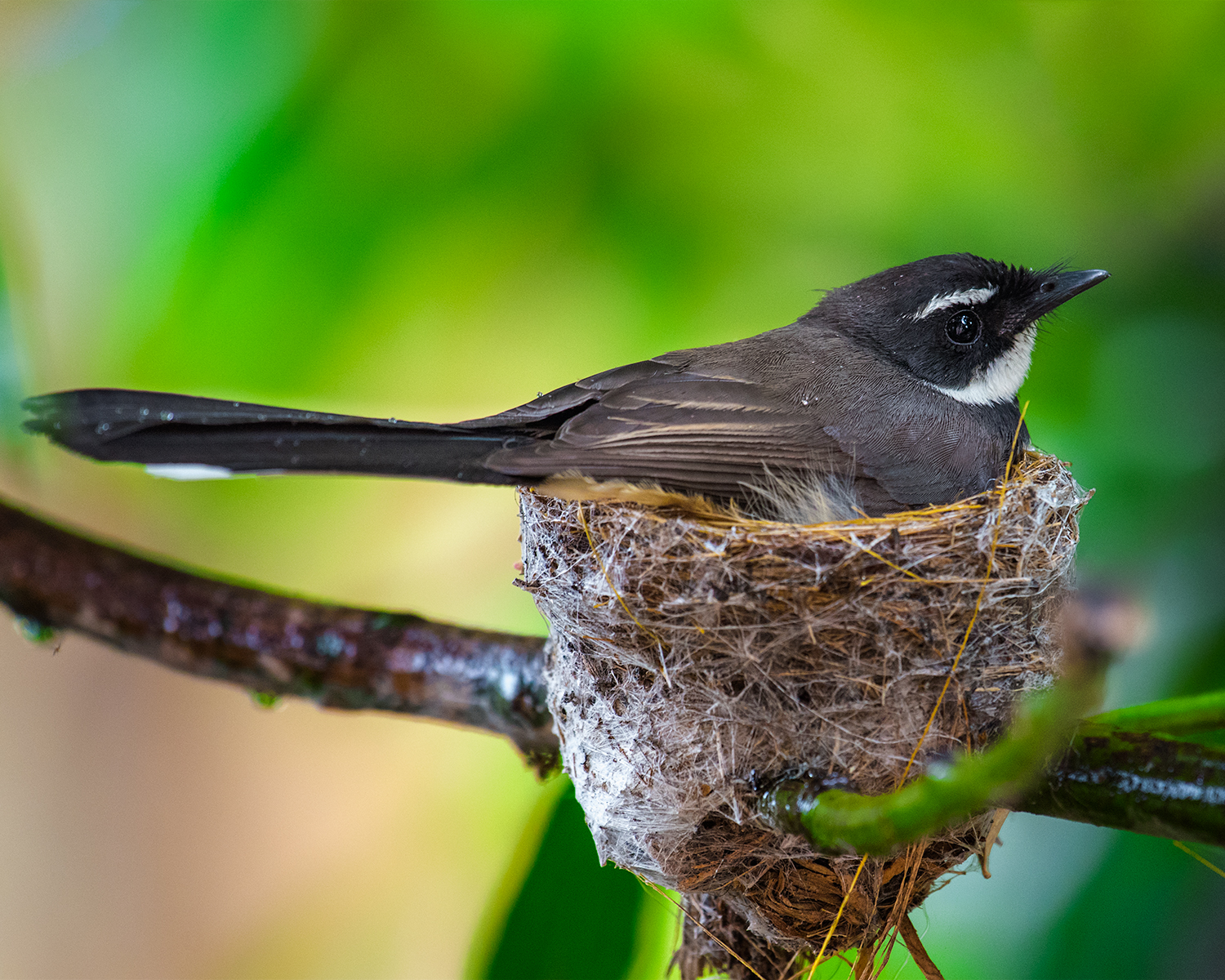
On a nest

== Ecology and behavior ==
The Philippine pied fantail eats insects, which it catches on the wing. It joins mixed flocks with other insectivorous birds, and sometimes follows large mammals to feed on insects they disturb.

It breeds from March to June, nesting in a cup made from grass, roots, and fibres lined with spider webs. Clutch size is usually 2 to 3 eggs.

It is known to be very aggressive against potential predators, diving on humans, cats, and dogs when breeding

== Habitat and conservation status ==
This species is extremely adaptable to a variety of wooded and scrubby lowland habitats, found in lowland forest, second growth, agricultural areas, scrub, beaches, and parks. The IUCN has classified the species as least concern as it is common throughout its wide range, though they do evaluate its population as declining.
