= Sibuyan Sea =

Small sea in the Philippines

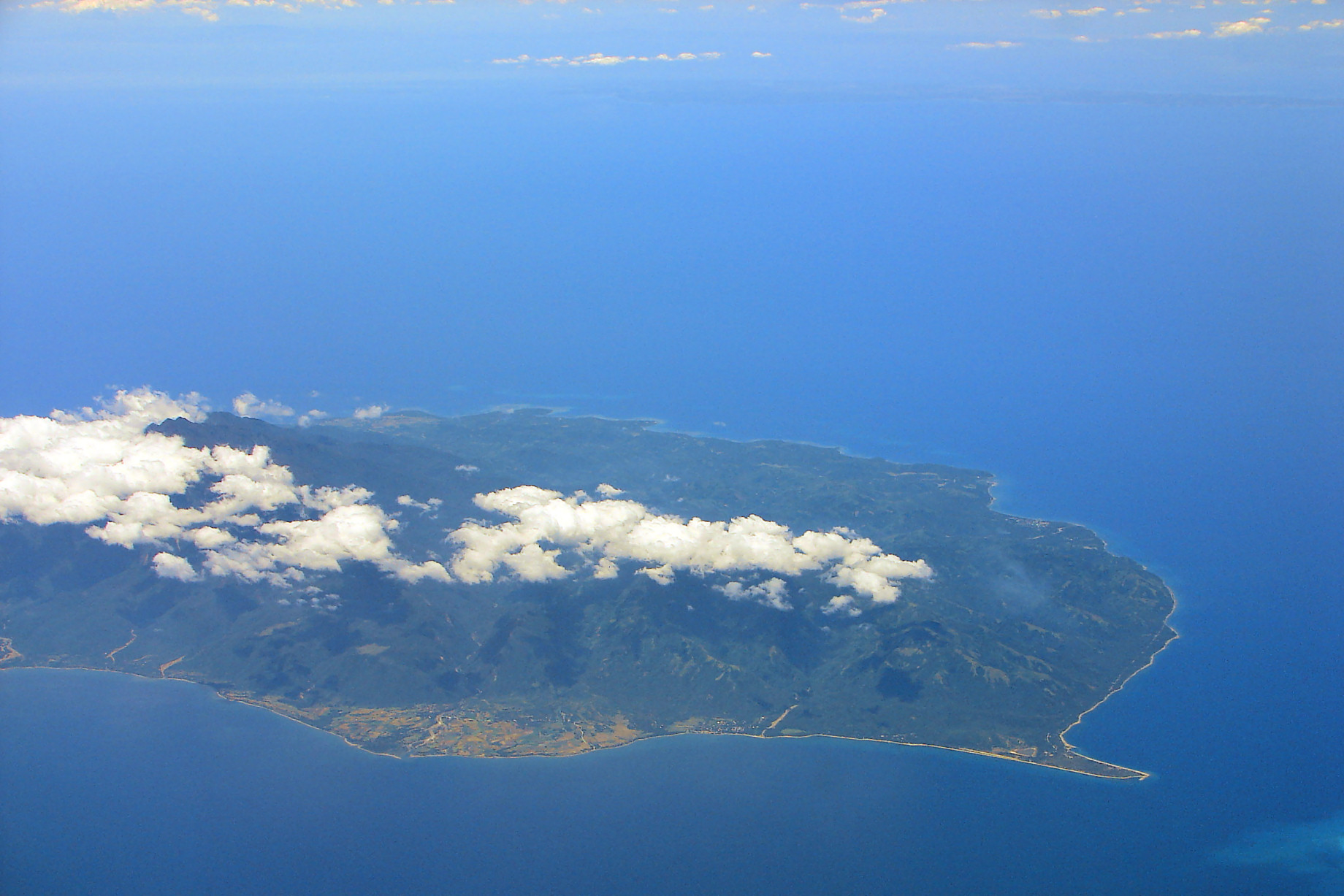
- Aerial view of Sibuyan Island within the sea

- Location within the Philippines Sibuyan Sea (Luzon) Sibuyan Sea (Philippines)
- Location: Bicol Region; Mimaropa; Western Visayas
- Coordinates: 12°40′00″N 122°30′00″E
- Type: sea
- Etymology: Sibuyan
- Basin countries: Philippines

The Sibuyan Sea is a small sea in the Philippines separating Luzon and the Visayas. The South Sibuyan Sea has been called "The Galápagos of Asia" due to its geographic isolation and biodiversity.

== Geography ==
It is bounded by the island of Panay to the south, Mindoro to the west, Masbate to the east, and to the north Marinduque and the Bicol Peninsula of Luzon.

The Sibuyan Sea is connected to the Sulu Sea via the Tablas Strait in the west, the South China Sea via the Isla Verde Passage in the northwest, and the Visayan Sea via the Jintotolo Channel in the south-east. The Romblon Islands lie within the Sibuyan Sea.

== History ==
The sea was the site of the Battle of the Sibuyan Sea on October 24, 1944, where the Japanese battleship Musashi was sunk and other ships were damaged.
