= List of rail transit stations in the Greater Manila Area =

System map of stations in operation (Note: Operating PNR stations are not reflected.)

The following is an alphabetical list of rail transit stations in the Greater Manila Area, which make up the region's rail network. The list includes existing and future Manila Light Rail Transit System (LRT), Manila Metro Rail Transit System (MRT) and Philippine National Railways (PNR) stations in the region.

== Summary ==
There are 63 operational stations on the Greater Manila Area's rail network, with 38 from the LRT's two lines, 13 from the MRT's one line, and 12 from the PNR. There were also previously 35 operational PNR stations, but operations were suspended to give way for the construction of the North–South Commuter Railway (NSCR). In the future, 88 new stations are under construction and are planned to be opened: 39 for the MRT, 8 for the LRT, and 36 for the PNR, bringing the total to 146 stations. (Note: Six future stations of the PNR are located outside of the Greater Manila Area. However, these stations are still considered part of the rail network and are listed below.)

All stations, except for Antipolo and the 12 operational stations of the PNR, are situated within Metro Manila, with several future stations planned for the surrounding regions. Six stations serve as interchanges where commuters can switch lines. However, these stations are distinct structures from one another and are considered independent of each other.

Stations often derive their names from the streets or localities they serve. Consequently, it is possible for two separate stations to have identical names even though they are not in proximity to each other. For instance, the PNR EDSA station is situated near the Magallanes Interchange, while the LRT EDSA station can be found on the intersection between Taft Avenue and EDSA.

== Current stations ==
Legend
†	Existing terminus

=== Manila Light Rail Transit System ===
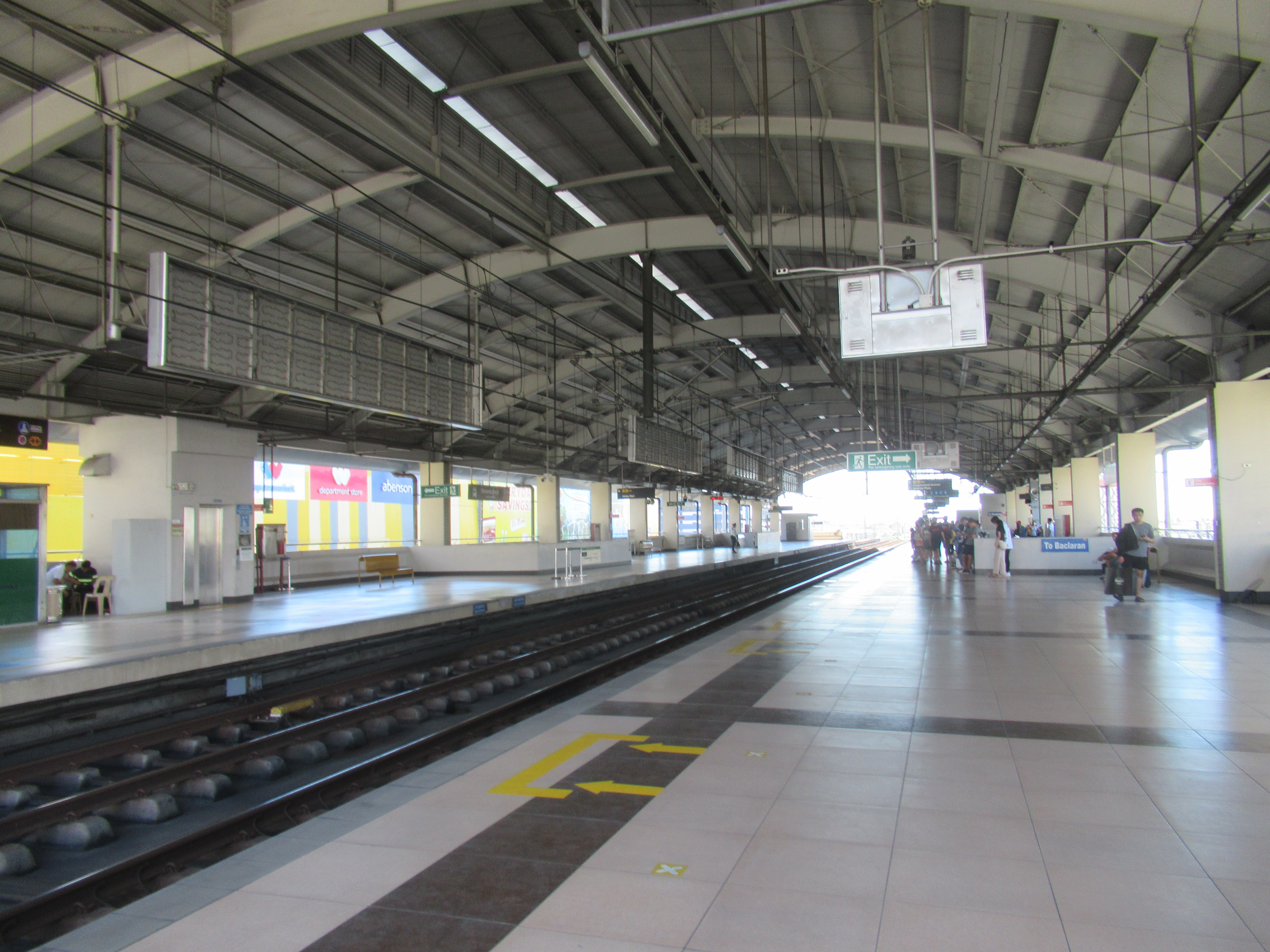
Fernando Poe Jr., current northern terminus for Line 1

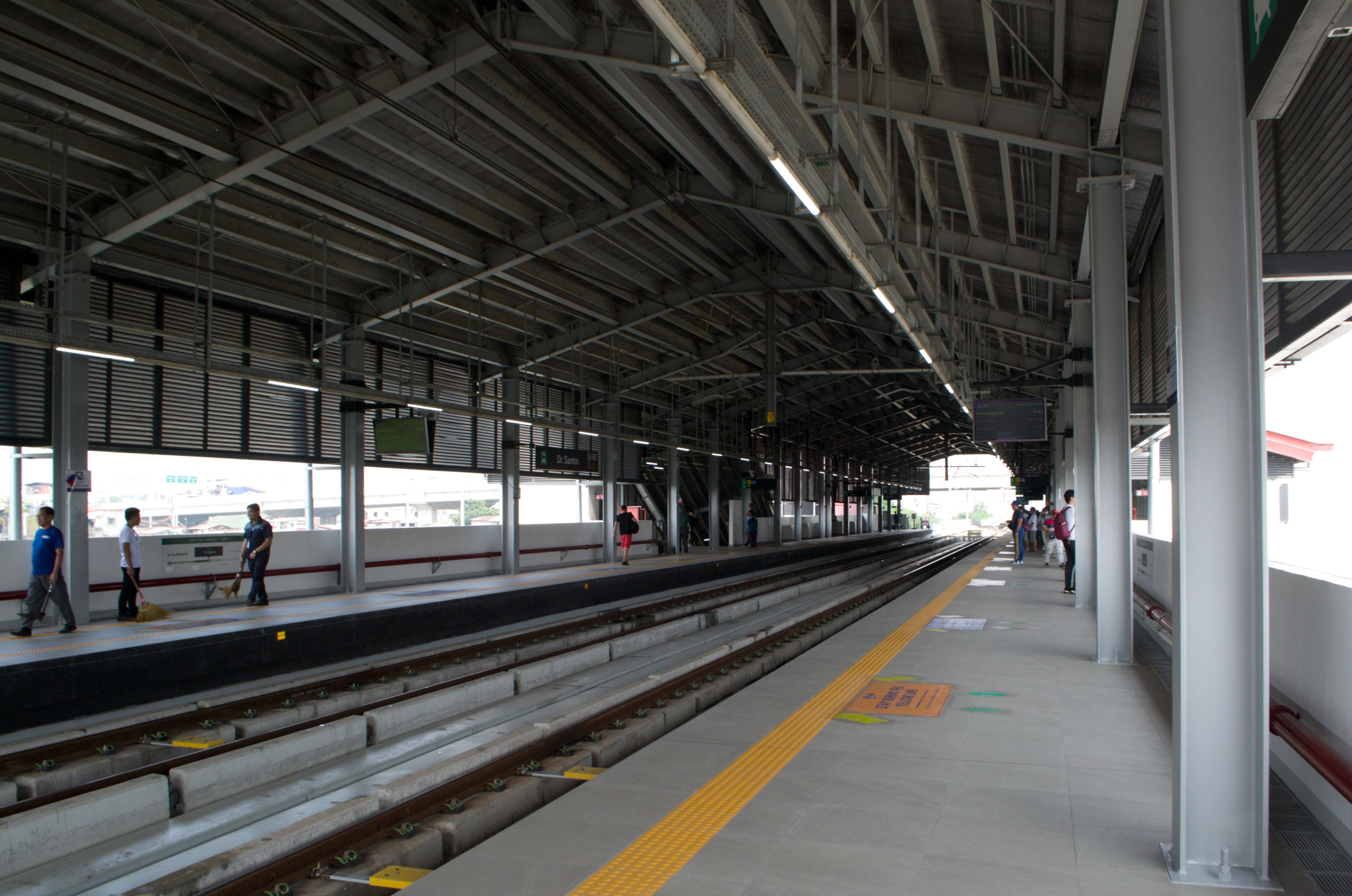
Dr. Santos, current southern terminus for Line 1

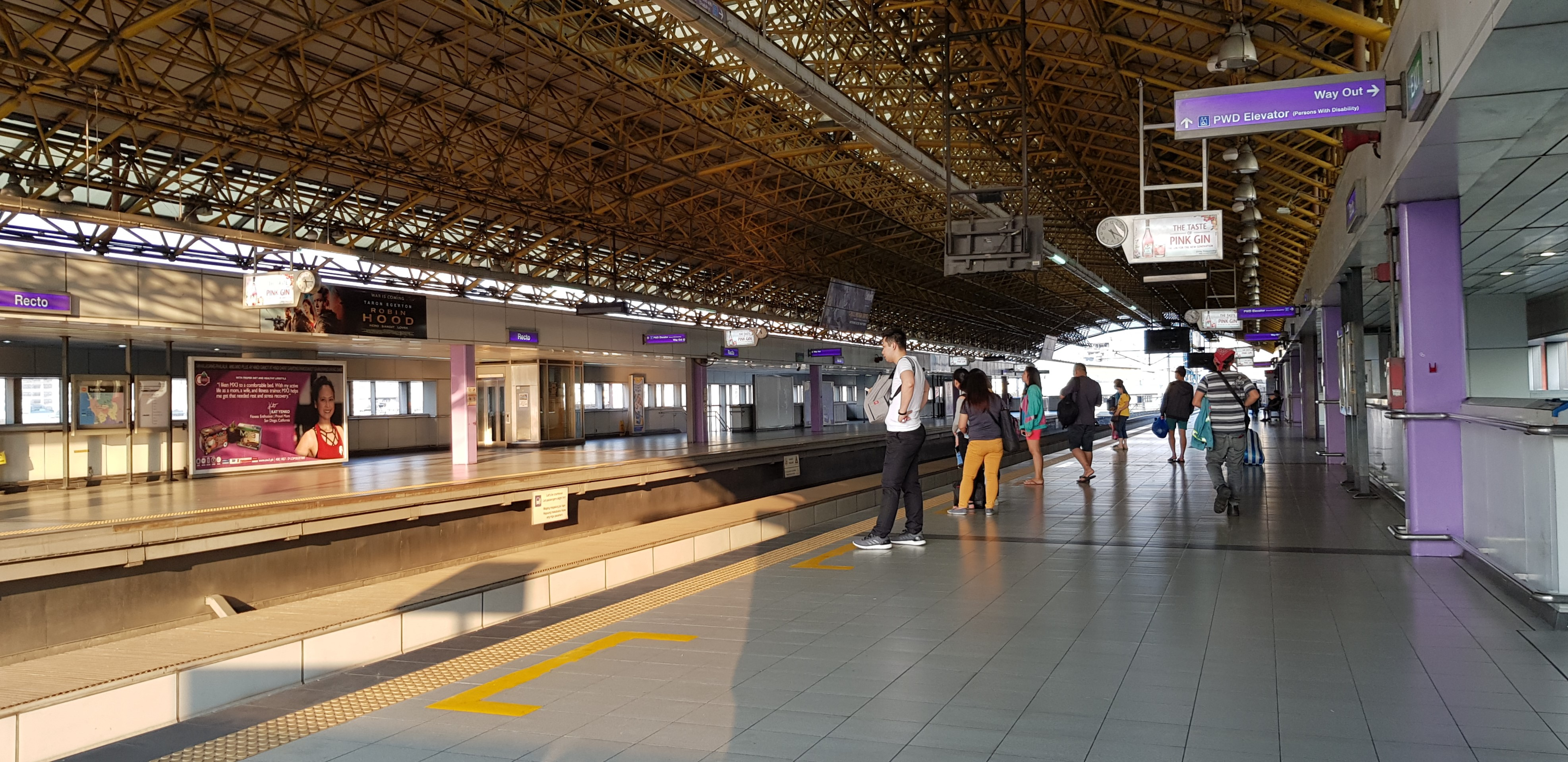
Recto, current western terminus for Line 2

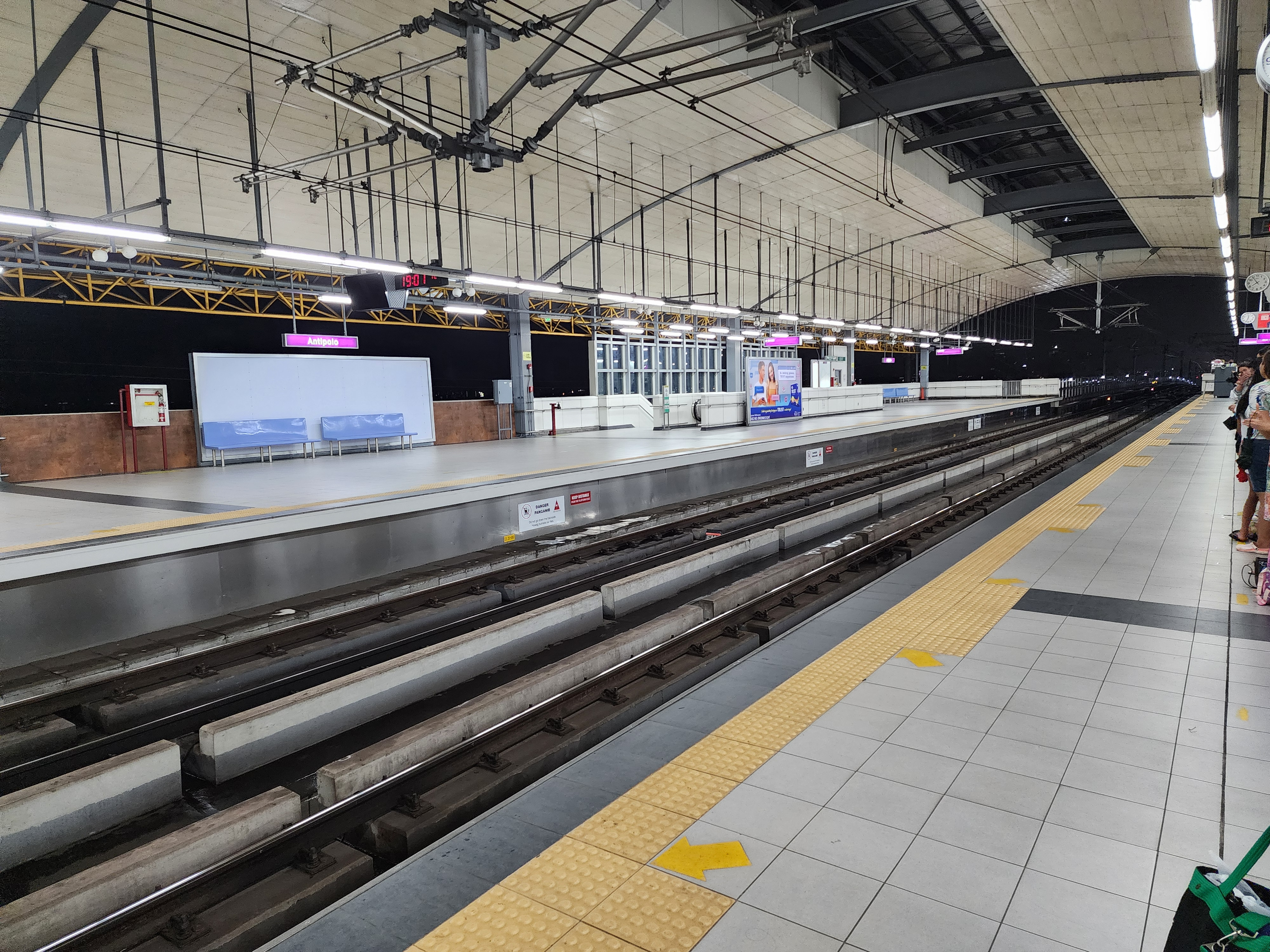
Antipolo, current eastern terminus for Line 2

Station	Line	Location	Opening date	Connections	Notes
5th Avenue	1	Caloocan	May 12, 1985	Bus routes: 8 14 35 42 54 5th Avenue	Unrelated to the PNR station of the same name
Abad Santos	1	Manila	May 12, 1985	Bus routes: 8 42 54 Abad Santos	
Anonas	2	Quezon City	April 5, 2003	Manila MRT: MMS Anonas; Bus routes: 3 51 Anonas	
Antipolo †	2	Antipolo	July 5, 2021	Bus routes: 3 56 SM Masinag	Formerly Masinag
Araneta Center–Cubao	2	Quezon City	April 5, 2003	Bus routes: 3 Gateway Mall 51 53 61 ACBP	Also known as Cubao
Baclaran	1	Pasay	December 1, 1984		
Balintawak	1	Quezon City	March 22, 2010	EDSA Carousel: 1 Balintawak; Bus routes: 5 8 9 13 19 20 21 22 37 38 40 52 Ayala Malls Cloverleaf	
Bambang	1	Manila	May 12, 1985	Bus routes: 42 Bambang	
Betty Go-Belmonte	2	Quezon City	April 5, 2004	Bus routes: 3 Betty Go-Belmonte	
Blumentritt	1	Manila	May 12, 1985	PNR: Blumentritt; Bus routes: 42 Blumentritt	
Carriedo	1	Manila	April 14, 1985	Bus routes: 42 Escolta 2 3 5 6 7 14 17 34 38 40 49 52 53 54 Quiapo; Pasig River Ferry Service: Escolta Ferry Station	
Central Terminal	1	Manila	December 1, 1984	Bus routes: 5 6 7 14 17 23 24 25 27 34 38 40 42 48 49 52 53 54 Lawton; Pasig River Ferry Service: Lawton Ferry Station	
Doroteo Jose	1	Manila	May 12, 1985	Manila LRT: Recto; Manila MRT: 8 Lerma; Bus routes: 13 19 20 21 Avenida 42 Recto	
Dr. Santos †	1	Parañaque	November 16, 2024		Also known as Sucat station
EDSA	1	Pasay	December 1, 1984	Manila MRT: Taft Avenue; EDSA Carousel: 1 Taft Avenue	Unrelated to the PNR and MRT stations of the same name
Fernando Poe Jr. †	1	Quezon City	October 22, 2010	EDSA Carousel: 1 Roosevelt	Formerly Roosevelt
Gil Puyat	1	Pasay	December 1, 1984	Bus routes: 5 6 7 10 11 12 14 17 23 24 25 27 34 38 40 42 48 49 53 62 Buendia 4 Taft Avenue	
Gilmore	2	Quezon City	April 5, 2004	Bus routes: 3 Gilmore	
J. Ruiz	2	San Juan	April 5, 2004	Bus routes: 3 J. Ruiz	
Katipunan	2	Quezon City	April 5, 2003	Bus routes: 3 Katipunan 18 36 39 41 50 51 56 Aurora Boulevard	
Legarda	2	Manila	April 5, 2004	Bus routes: 2 3 Legarda	
Libertad	1	Manila	December 1, 1984		
Marikina–Pasig	2	Marikina	July 5, 2021	Bus routes: 3 56 Robinsons Metro East	Formerly Emerald and Marikina
MIA Road	1	Parañaque	November 16, 2024	Bus routes: 35 49 MIA Road	
Monumento	1	Caloocan	May 12, 1985	EDSA Carousel: 1 Monumento; Bus routes: 9 14 35 37 42 54 Monumento	
Ninoy Aquino Avenue	1	Parañaque	November 16, 2024		
Pedro Gil	1	Manila	December 1, 1984	Bus routes: 5 6 7 14 17 23 24 25 27 34 38 40 42 48 49 53 P. Gil	
PITX	1	Parañaque	November 16, 2024	EDSA Carousel: 1 PITX; Bus routes: 4 5 6 7 14 18 22 23 26 27 28 29 30 31 32 34 43 47 52 55 65 PITX	Also known as Asia World
Pureza	2	Manila	April 5, 2004	PNR: Santa Mesa; Bus routes: 2 3 Pureza; Pasig River Ferry Service: PUP Ferry Station	
Quirino	1	Manila	December 1, 1984	Bus routes: 5 6 7 14 17 23 24 25 27 34 38 40 42 48 49 53 Quirino	
Recto †	2	Manila	October 29, 2004	Manila LRT: Doroteo Jose; Manila MRT: 8 Lerma; Bus routes: 13 19 20 21 Avenida 42 Recto	
Redemptorist–Aseana	1	Parañaque	November 16, 2024	Bus routes: 35 49 Baclaran	
R. Papa	1	Manila	December 1, 1984	Bus routes: 8 42 54 R. Papa	
Santolan	2	Marikina / Pasig	April 5, 2003	Bus routes: 3 56 SM Marikina 36 Marikina Riverbanks	
Tayuman	1	Manila	May 12, 1985	Bus routes: 42 Tayuman	Unrelated to the PNR station of the same name
United Nations	1	Manila	December 1, 1984	Bus routes: 5 6 7 14 17 23 24 25 27 34 38 40 42 48 49 53 54 UN Avenue	
V. Mapa	2	Manila	April 5, 2004	Bus routes: 2 3 SM Centerpoint	
Vito Cruz	1	Manila	December 1, 1984	Bus routes: 5 6 7 14 17 23 24 25 27 34 38 40 42 48 49 53 V. Cruz	Unrelated to the PNR station of the same name

=== Manila Metro Rail Transit System ===
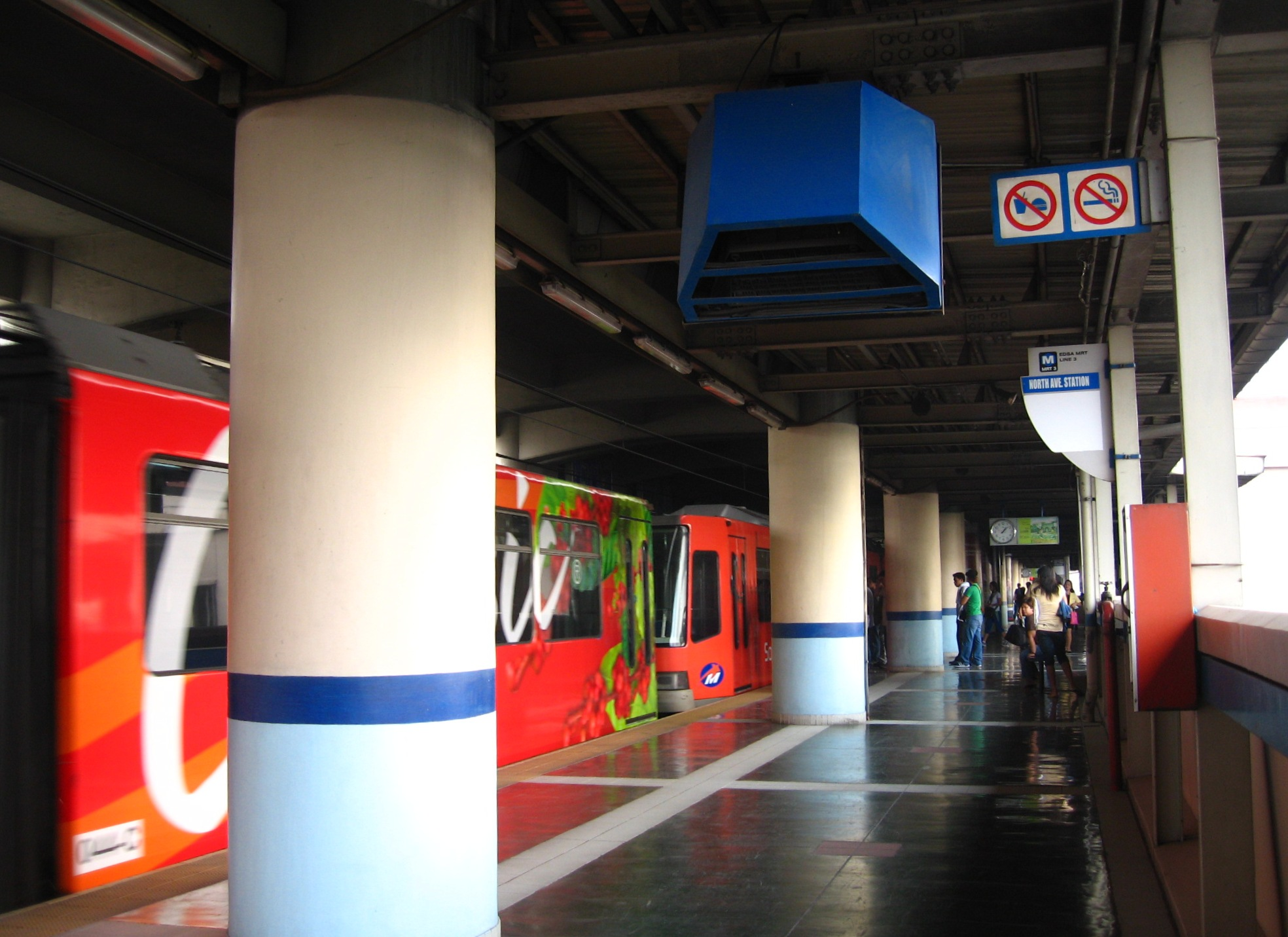
North Avenue, current northern terminus for Line 3

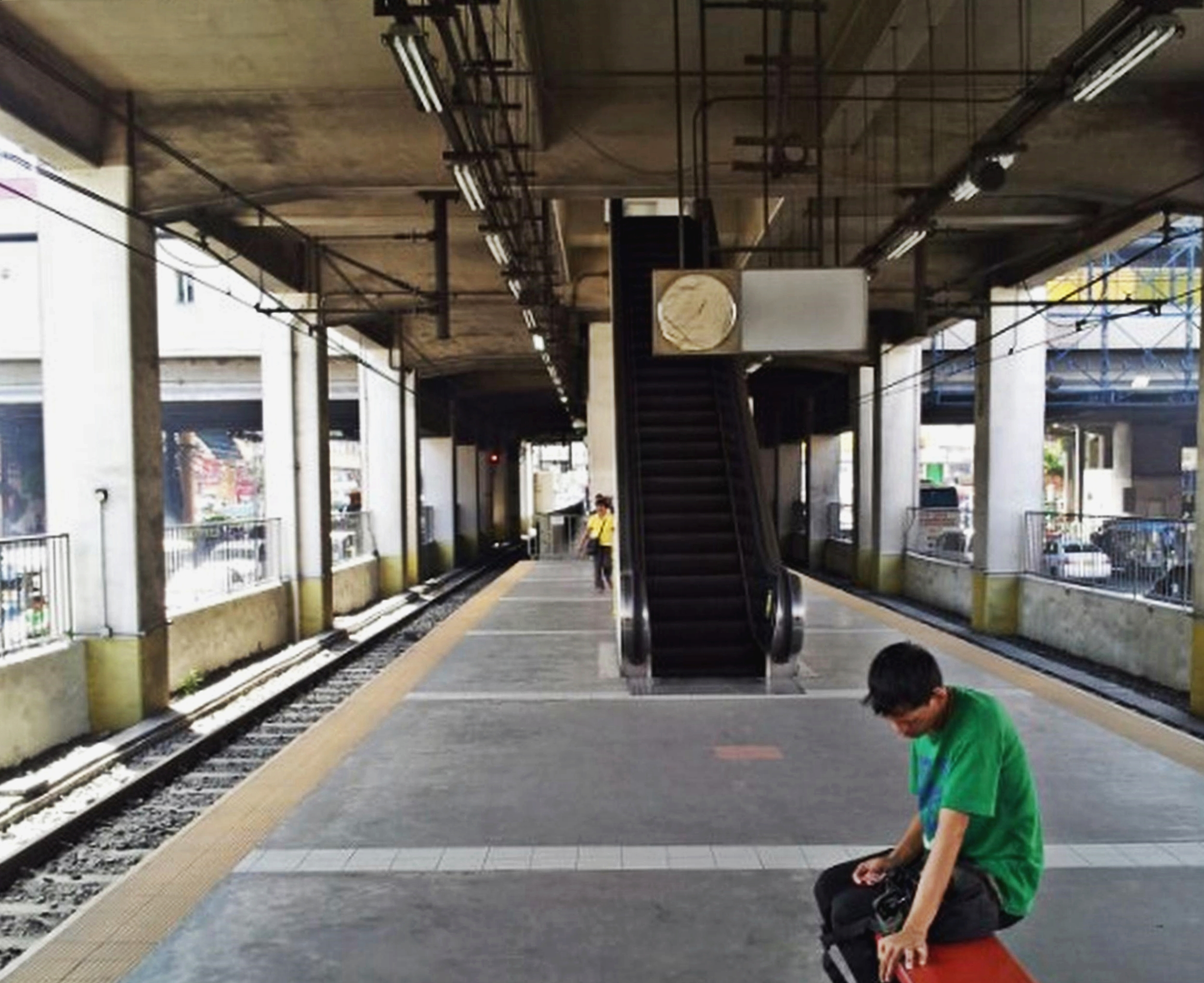
Taft Avenue, current southern terminus for Line 3

Station	Line	Location	Opening date	Connections	Notes
Araneta Center–Cubao	3	Quezon City	December 15, 1999	Manila LRT: Araneta Center–Cubao; Bus routes: 3 Gateway Mall 51 53 61 ACBP	Also known as Cubao
Ayala	3	Makati	July 20, 2000	EDSA Carousel: 1 Ayala; BGC Bus: EX01 NX01 WX01 L01 NR01 AX01 BA01 WE01 Ayala; Bus routes: 10 11 12 38 40 45 46 59 One Ayala 62 63 Ayala	
Boni	3	Mandaluyong	December 15, 1999		
Buendia	3	Makati	December 15, 1999	EDSA Carousel: 1 Buendia	
Guadalupe	3	Makati	December 15, 1999	Manila MRT: 5 Guadalupe; EDSA Carousel: 1 Guadalupe; Pasig River Ferry Service: Guadalupe Ferry Station	
Kamuning	3	Quezon City	December 15, 1999	EDSA Carousel: 1 Kamuning	
Magallanes	3	Makati	July 20, 2000	PNR: EDSA; Bus routes: 10 11 12 38 40 45 46 59 Magallanes	
North Avenue †	3	Quezon City	December 15, 1999	EDSA Carousel: 1 North Avenue; Bus routes: 18 33 64 SM North EDSA	
Ortigas	3	Mandaluyong	December 15, 1999	Manila MRT: 4 EDSA; EDSA Carousel: 1 Ortigas; Bus routes: 2 Robinsons Galleria	
Quezon Avenue	3	Quezon City	December 15, 1999	Manila MRT: MMS Quezon Avenue; EDSA Carousel: 1 Quezon Avenue; Bus routes: 6 7 17 34 49 Eton Centris	
Santolan–Annapolis	3	Quezon City	December 15, 1999	EDSA Carousel: 1 Santolan	Also known as Santolan
Shaw Boulevard	3	Mandaluyong	December 15, 1999		
Taft Avenue †	3	Pasay	July 20, 2000	Manila LRT: EDSA; EDSA Carousel: 1 Tramo 1 Taft Avenue	

=== Philippine National Railways ===
Station	Service	Location	Opening date	Notes
Calamba †	Inter-Provincial Commuter	Calamba	December 2, 2014	Northern terminus
Candelaria	Inter-Provincial Commuter	Candelaria	October 7, 2022	Flagstop
Los Baños	Inter-Provincial Commuter	Los Baños	October 7, 2022	Flagstop
College	Inter-Provincial Commuter	Los Baños	October 7, 2022	Flagstop
IRRI	Inter-Provincial Commuter	Los Baños	October 7, 2022	Flagstop
Pansol	Inter-Provincial Commuter	Calamba	October 7, 2022	Flagstop
Masili	Inter-Provincial Commuter	Calamba	October 7, 2022	Flagstop
Lucena †	Inter-Provincial Commuter	Lucena	October 7, 2022	Southern terminus
Lutucan	Inter-Provincial Commuter	Sariaya	October 7, 2022	Flagstop
Sariaya	Inter-Provincial Commuter	Sariaya	October 7, 2022	Flagstop
San Pablo	Inter-Provincial Commuter	San Pablo	October 7, 2022	
Tiaong	Inter-Provincial Commuter	Tiaong	October 7, 2022	Flagstop; also known as Lalig

== Future stations ==
Construction of the North Triangle Common Station, an interchange station for LRT Line 1, MRT Lines 3 and 7

=== Manila Light Rail Transit System ===
Station	Line	Location	Status	Notes
Divisoria	2	Manila	Proposed	
Las Piñas	1	Las Piñas	Proposed	
Pier 4	2	Manila	Proposed	New western terminus
Malvar	1	Caloocan	Proposed	Infill station
Niog	1	Bacoor	Proposed	New southern terminus
North Triangle	1	Quezon City	Under construction	New northern terminus
Talaba	1	Bacoor	Proposed	
Tutuban	2	Manila	Under construction	
Zapote	1	Bacoor	Proposed	

=== Manila Metro Rail Transit System ===
Station	Line	Location	Status	Notes
Anonas	MMS	Quezon City	Under construction	
Asia World	MMS	Parañaque	Proposed	Planned terminus for the NAIA spur line
Aurora Boulevard	4	Quezon City	Proposed	Western terminus
Batasan	7	Quezon City	Under construction	
Bicutan	MMS	Parañaque	Proposed	
BGC	MMS	Taguig	Proposed	
Camp Aguinaldo	MMS	Quezon City	Under construction	
Diokno Boulevard	3	Pasay	Proposed	
Dolores	4	Taytay	Proposed	
Don Antonio	7	Quezon City	Under construction	
Doña Carmen	7	Quezon City	Under construction	
EDSA	4	Quezon City	Proposed	Unrelated to the PNR and LRT stations of the same name
East Avenue	MMS	Quezon City	Under construction	
East Valenzuela	MMS	Valenzuela	Under construction	Northern terminus
Felix Avenue	4	Cainta	Proposed	
FTI	MMS	Taguig	Proposed	
Greenhills	4	San Juan	Proposed	
Kalayaan	MMS	Taguig	Proposed	
Lagro	7	Quezon City	Under construction	
Manggahan	7	Quezon City	Under construction	
McKinley Hill	MMS	Taguig	Proposed	
Meralco	4	Pasig	Proposed	
Mindanao Avenue	7	Quezon City	Under construction	
NAIA Terminal 1 & 2	MMS	Pasay	Proposed	
NAIA Terminal 3	MMS	Pasay	Proposed	
Nichols	MMS	Taguig	Proposed	
North Triangle	3	Quezon City	Under construction	New northern terminus
North Triangle	7	Quezon City	Under construction	Southern terminus
North Avenue	MMS	Quezon City	Under construction	Unrelated to the Line 3 station of the same name
Ortigas	MMS	Pasig	Under construction	
Quezon Avenue	MMS	Quezon City	Under construction	
Quezon Memorial	7	Quezon City	Under construction	
Quirino Highway	MMS	Quezon City	Under construction	
Regalado Avenue	7	Quezon City	Under construction	
Rosario	4	Pasig	Proposed	
Roxas Boulevard	3	Pasay	Proposed	
Sacred Heart	7	Quezon City	Under construction	
San Jose del Monte	7	San Jose del Monte	Proposed	Northern terminus
Santolan	4	San Juan	Proposed	
Shaw Boulevard	MMS	Pasig	Under construction	
Sierra Valley	4	Cainta	Proposed	Infill station
Tala	7	Caloocan	Under construction	
Tandang Sora	7	Quezon City	Under construction	Unrelated to the MMS station of the same name
Tandang Sora	MMS	Quezon City	Under construction	Unrelated to the Line 7 station of the same name
Taytay	4	Taytay	Proposed	Eastern terminus
Tiendesitas	4	Pasig	Proposed	Infill station
Tikling	4	Taytay	Proposed	
University Avenue	7	Quezon City	Under construction	

=== Philippine National Railways ===
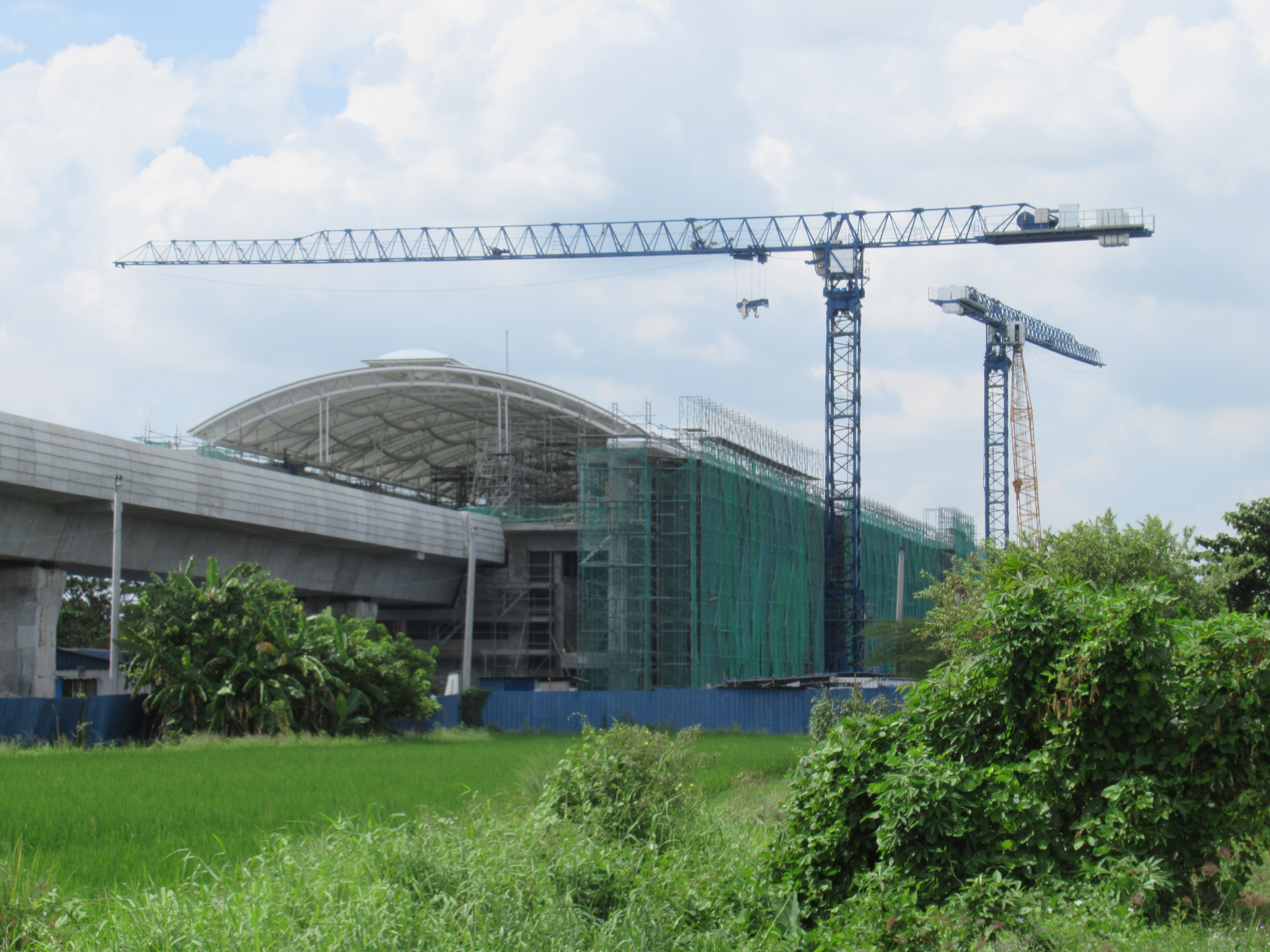
Construction of Balagtas station in Balagtas, Bulacan

Station	Location	Status	Notes
Alabang	Muntinlupa	Under construction	
Angeles	Angeles City (Note: Geographically situated outside the Greater Manila Area.)	Under construction	
Apalit	Apalit	Under construction	
Balagtas	Balagtas, Bulacan	Under construction	
Banlic	Calamba, Laguna	Under construction	
Bicutan	Parañaque	Under construction	
Biñan	Biñan	Under construction	
Blumentritt	Manila	Under construction	
Bocaue	Bocaue	Under construction	
Buendia	Makati	Under construction	
Cabuyao	Cabuyao	Under construction	
Calamba	Calamba, Laguna	Under construction	
Caloocan	Caloocan	Under construction	
Calumpit	Calumpit	Under construction	
Clark	Mabalacat	Under construction	
Clark International Airport	Mabalacat	Under construction	
EDSA	Makati	Under construction	Unrelated to the LRT and MRT stations of the same name
España	Manila	Under construction	
FTI	Taguig	Under construction	
Guiguinto	Guiguinto		
Malabon	Malabon	Proposed	Infill station
Malolos	Malolos	Under construction	
Malolos South	Malolos	Proposed	Infill station
Marilao	Marilao	Under construction	
Meycauayan	Meycauayan	Under construction	
Muntinlupa	Muntinlupa	Under construction	
New Clark City	Capas	Proposed	
Nichols	Taguig	Under construction	
Pacita	San Pedro, Laguna	Under construction	
Paco	Manila	Under construction	
San Fernando	San Fernando, Pampanga	Under construction	
San Pedro	San Pedro, Laguna	Under construction	
Santa Mesa	Santa Mesa	Under construction	
Santa Rosa	Santa Rosa, Laguna	Under construction	
Solis	Manila	Under construction	
Sucat	Muntinlupa	Under construction	
Tabing Ilog	Marilao	Proposed	Infill station
Tuktukan	Guiguinto	Proposed	Infill station
West Valenzuela	Valenzuela	Under construction	

== Closed stations ==
=== Philippine National Railways ===
As most stations of the PNR are defunct, only listed below are stations from previously operating sections of the contemporary Metro Commuter Line which are closed and are currently not in the process of being reconstructed.

Station	Location	Status	Notes
5th Avenue	Caloocan	No structures	Closed due to the NSCR's construction; no replacement
10th Avenue	Caloocan	Intact	Closed due to the NSCR's construction; no replacement
Buendia (old)	Makati	Intact	Permanently closed; replaced by Dela Rosa
Golden City 1	Biñan	No structures	Closed due to the NSCR's construction; no replacement
Laon Laan	Manila	Intact	Closed due to the NSCR's construction; no replacement
Pasay Road	Makati	Intact	Closed due to the NSCR's construction; no replacement
Tunasan	Muntinlupa	Demolished	Permanently closed; no replacement
San Andres	Manila	Intact	Closed due to the NSCR's construction; no replacement
Vito Cruz	Manila	Intact	Closed due to the NSCR's construction; no replacement

== Renamed stations ==
Former name	New name	Line	Renaming date	Notes
Emerald	Marikina–Pasig	2	October 31, 2021	Briefly renamed as Marikina (Note: The station was renamed in early 2021 as "Marikina." The current name, requested by the city governments of Cainta, Pasig, and Marikina, first appeared in an LRTA press release on the station's inauguration, although materials and signages were updated only on the renaming date.)
Masinag	Antipolo	2	May 20, 2021	
Roosevelt	Fernando Poe Jr.	1	August 20, 2023	Followed the renaming of its namesake avenue in 2022.

== See also ==
- Rail transportation in the Greater Manila Area
- Manila Light Rail Transit System
- Manila Metro Rail Transit System
- Philippine National Railways
