= Mindanao Avenue station =

Train station in Quezon City, Philippines

ML10	Mindanao Avenue
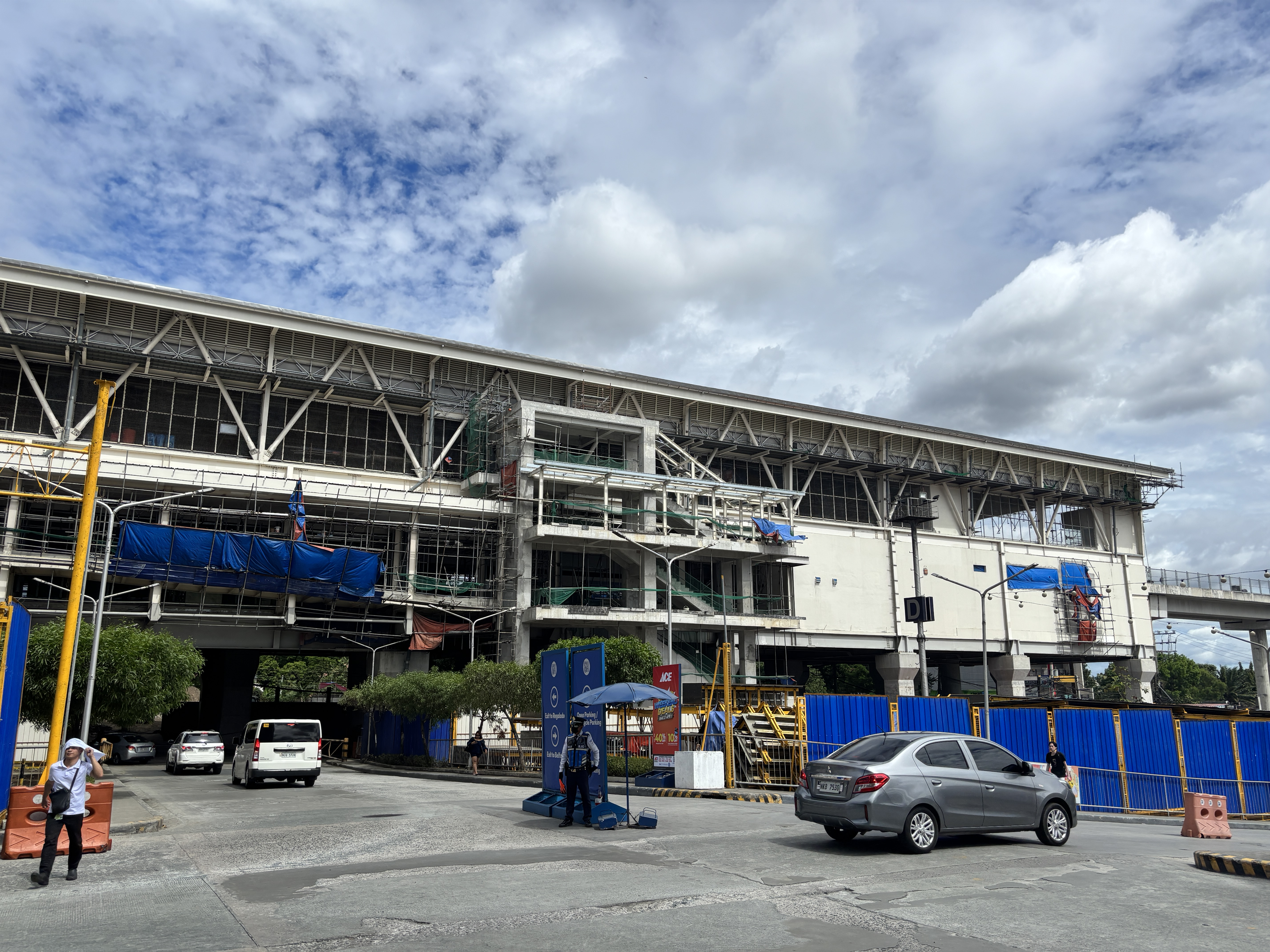
- Construction of Mindanao Avenue station on March 2025

General information
- Location: Regalado Highway; Greater Lagro, Quezon City; Philippines
- Coordinates: 14°43′58″N 121°03′40″E
- Owner: SMC-Mass Rail Transit 7 Incorporated
- Line: MRT Line 7
- Tracks: 2
- Connections: 6 7 49 SM City Fairview

Construction
- Structure type: Elevated
- Parking: Yes (SM City Fairview)
- Accessible: yes

Other information
- Status: Under construction

History
- Opening: c. 2027

Services
Preceding station	Manila MRT	Following station
Regalado Avenue towards North EDSA	MRT Line 7	Quirino towards San Jose Del Monte
Location

Mindanao Avenue station is an under-construction Metro Rail Transit (MRT) station located on the MRT Line 7 (MRT-7) system along Regalado Highway in barangay Greater Lagro, Quezon City. Named after the nearby Mindanao Avenue at the south, it is located next to SM City Fairview, as well as Fairview Terraces, Robinsons Novaliches, Commonwealth Hospital and Medical Center, Neopolitan Business Park, and Villa Viena.

== History ==
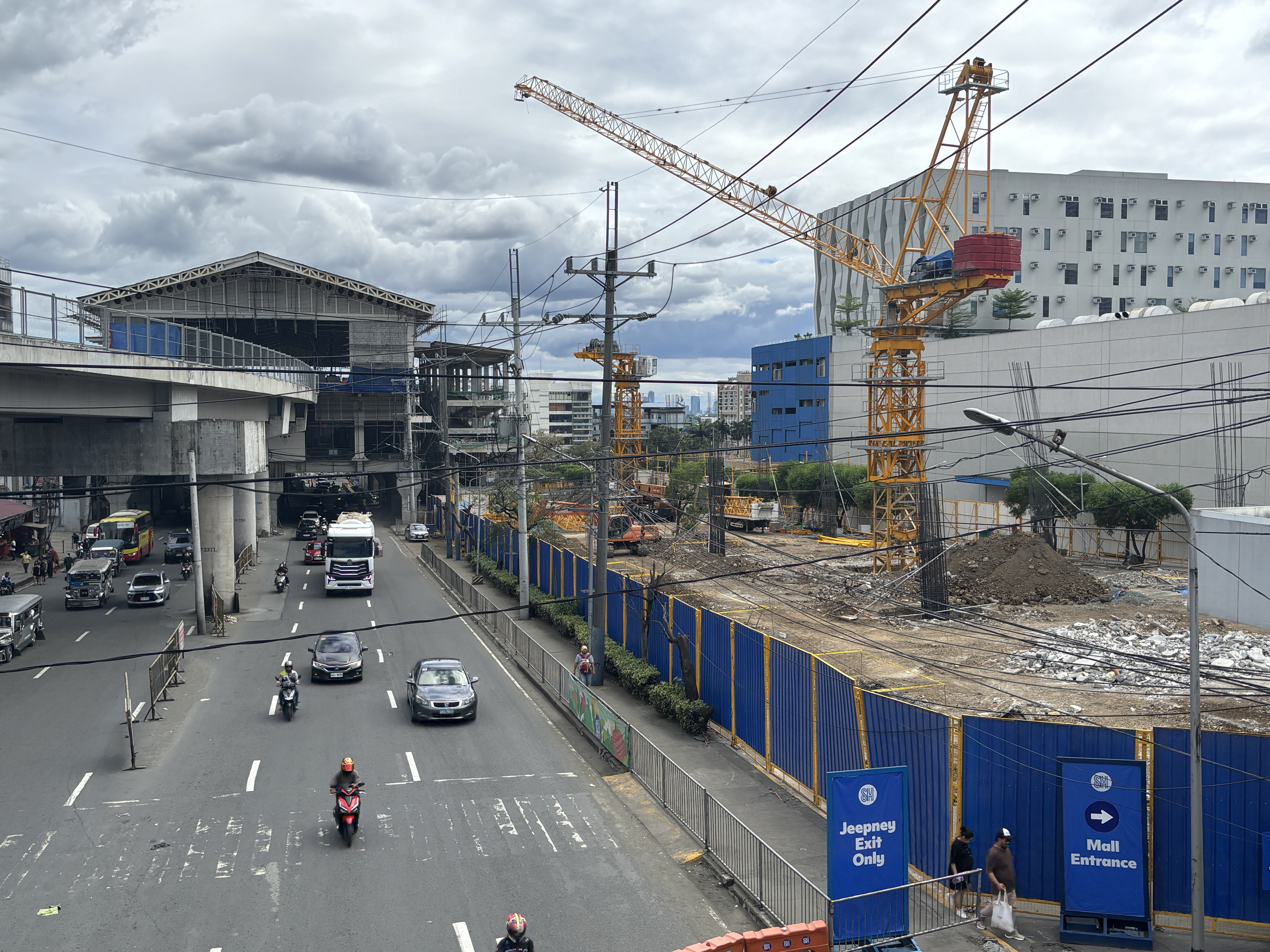
The station (left) and its link with SM City Fairview (right), both under construction as of March 2025

MRT Line 7 (MRT-7) construction works around the station began in 2017, specifically along parts of Regalado Highway stretching from Commonwealth to Mindanao Avenue. Part of the project included widening the highway to accommodate the structures being built. Then-administrator of Quezon City, Aldrin Cuna, said in June that the "[most] difficult portion" of the MRT-7 project was the construction along the highway due to it being narrow. In February 2018, MRT-7 contractor EEI Corporation conducted pile testing within the area; coping beams and box girders for the tracks were being installed by April and May.

Mindanao Avenue station is expected to be operational by 2027, alongside other stations from the North Triangle Common Station to Sacred Heart.
