= Quirino station (MRT) =

Train station in Quezon City, Philippines

| ML11 | Quirino |
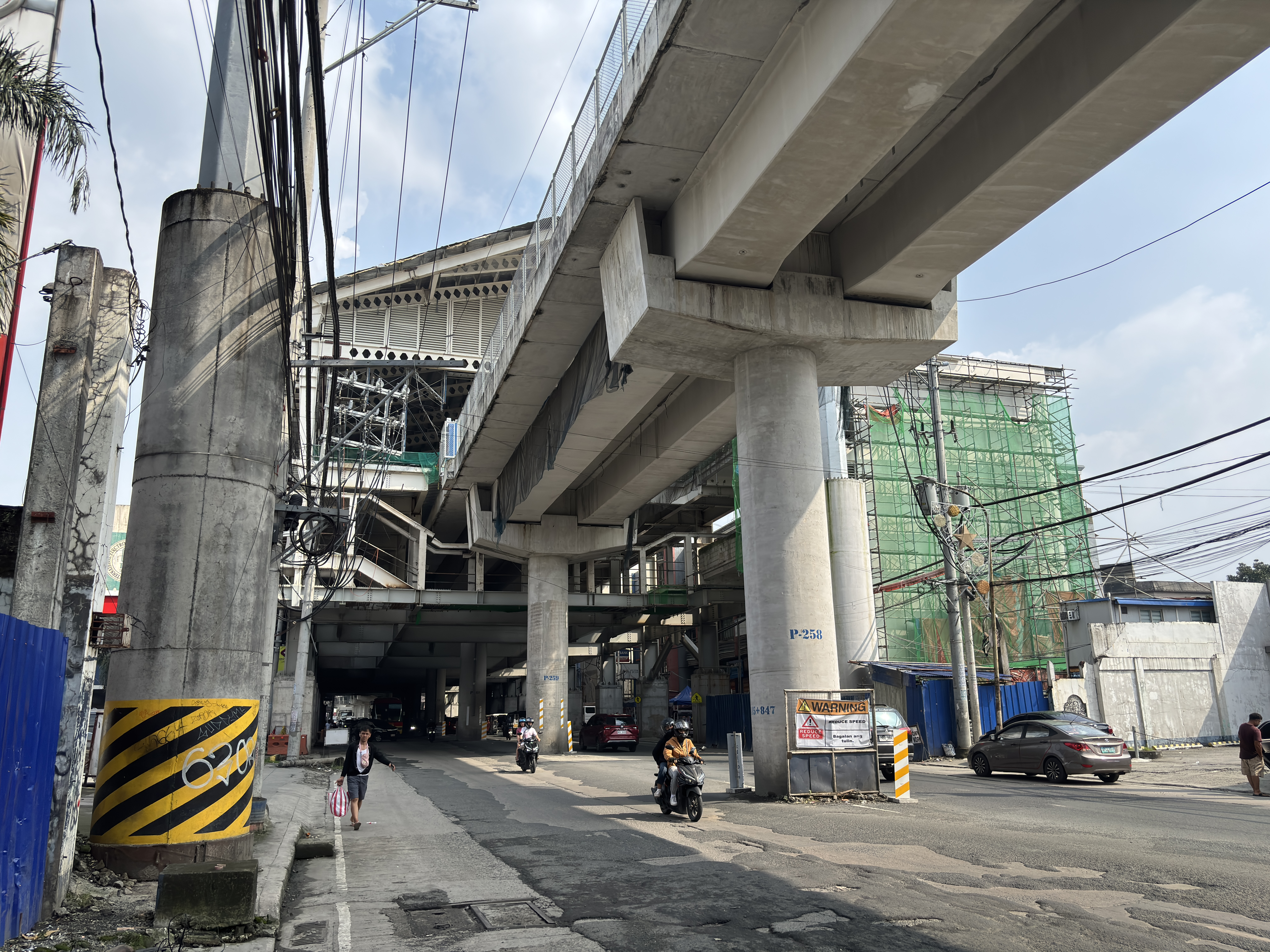
- Construction progress of Quirino station from street view, as of November 2025

General information
- Location: Quirino Highway; Greater Lagro and Pasong Putik Proper, Quezon City; Philippines
- Coordinates: 14°44′08″N 121°04′01″E
- Owner: SMC Mass Rail Transit 7 Incorporated
- Line: MRT Line 7
- Tracks: 2
- Connections: 6 49 Lagro

Construction
- Structure type: Elevated
- Accessible: yes

Other information
- Status: Under construction

History
- Opening: 2027

Services
| Preceding station | Manila MRT | Following station |
|---|---|---|
| Mindanao Avenue towards North EDSA | MRT Line 7 | Sacred Heart towards San Jose Del Monte |
Location

Quirino station, also known as Quirino Highway station, is an under-construction Metro Rail Transit (MRT) station located on the MRT Line 7 system along Quirino Highway in the barangays of Greater Lagro and Pasong Putik Proper, Quezon City.

Coming from the south, it is the first MRT-7 station along Quirino Highway. Adjacent landmarks include Trees Residences, School of Saint Anthony Quezon City, Lagro Subdivision, Sacred Heart Subdivision, Iglesia Ni Cristo's Lagro local congregation, and Our Lady of Fatima University Quezon City.
