= Tandang Sora station (MRT) =

Metro stop in Quezon City

ML04	Tandang Sora
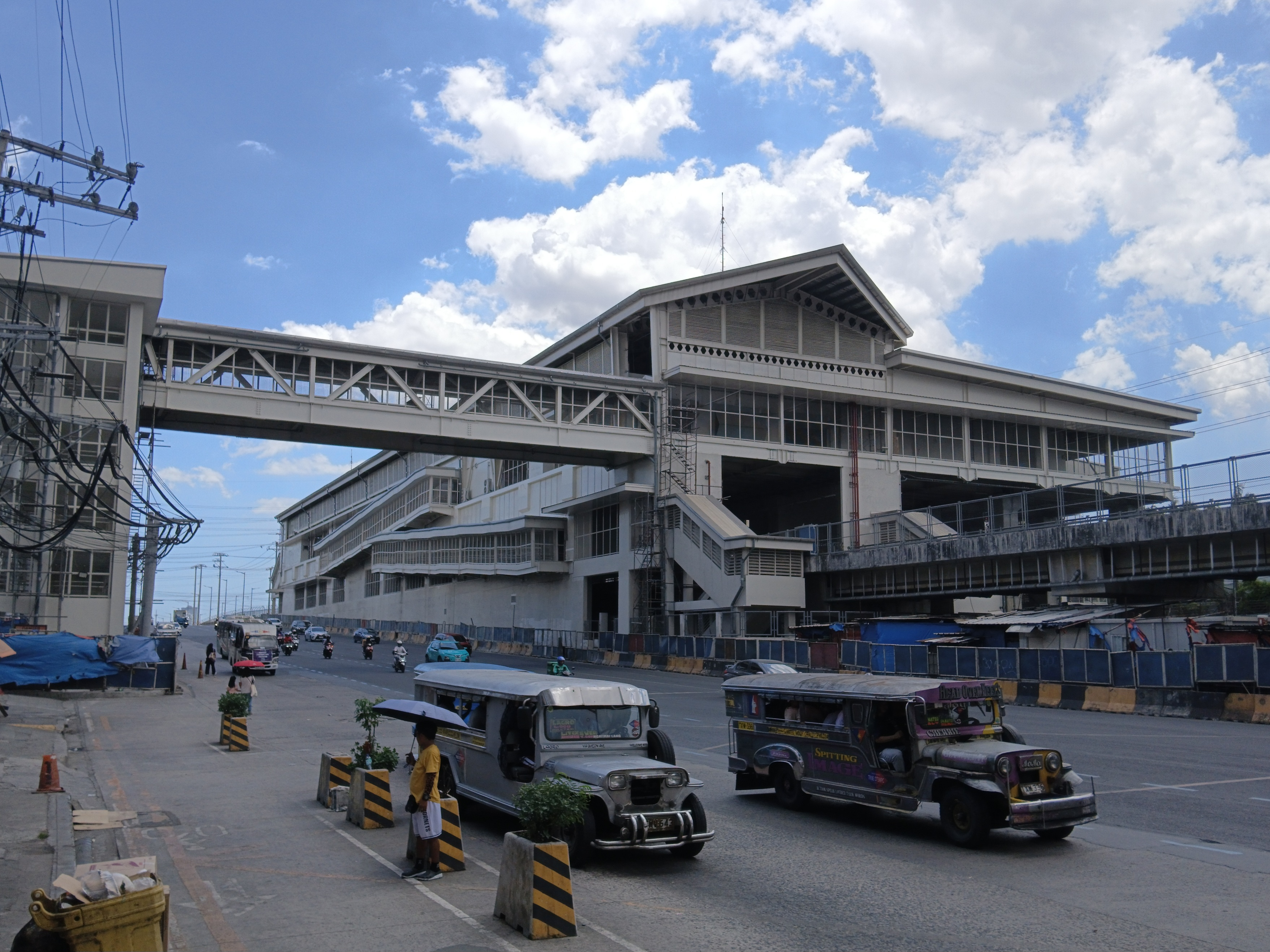
- Tandang Sora station construction progress as of May 2026

General information
- Location: Commonwealth Avenue; Matandang Balara and New Era, Quezon City; Philippines
- Coordinates: 14°39′48″N 121°04′03″E
- Owner: SMC-Mass Rail Transit 7 Incorporated
- Line: MRT Line 7
- Platforms: 2 side platforms
- Tracks: 2
- Connections: 6 7 49 Tandang Sora Avenue

Construction
- Structure type: Elevated
- Platform levels: 2; one concourse and one platform
- Accessible: Yes

Other information
- Status: Under construction

History
- Opening: 2027

Services
Preceding station	Manila MRT	Following station
University Avenue towards North EDSA	MRT Line 7	Don Antonio towards San Jose Del Monte
Location

Tandang Sora station is an under-construction Metro Rail Transit (MRT) station located on the MRT Line 7 (MRT-7) system along Commonwealth Avenue in Matandang Balara and New Era, Quezon City.

The Tandang Sora Flyover was demolished in March 2019 to give way for the construction of the MRT-7 station.

Nearest landmarks include the Iglesia ni Cristo Central Temple, New Era University and Net 25 TV studios.

The station is named after Melchora Aquino also known as Tandang Sora, one of the key personalities in the Philippine Revolution.

This station should not be confused with the future Tandang Sora Station of the Metro Manila Subway Line 9, to be constructed at the corner of Tandang Sora Avenue and Mindanao Avenue, also in Quezon City.

As of 31 January 2023, the project is 66.07% complete; the station's construction is planned to be finished by June of the same year.

== Station details ==
Tandang Sora station is located at Commonwealth Avenue between the barangays Matandang Balara and New Era in Quezon City. Once completed, the station will serve various establishments such as the Iglesia ni Cristo's Central Temple, New Era University, and Net 25 TV studios. It will be connected to various local bus routes via the Tandang Sora Avenue bus stop.
