= Sacred Heart station =

Train station in Quezon City, Philippines

ML12	Sacred Heart
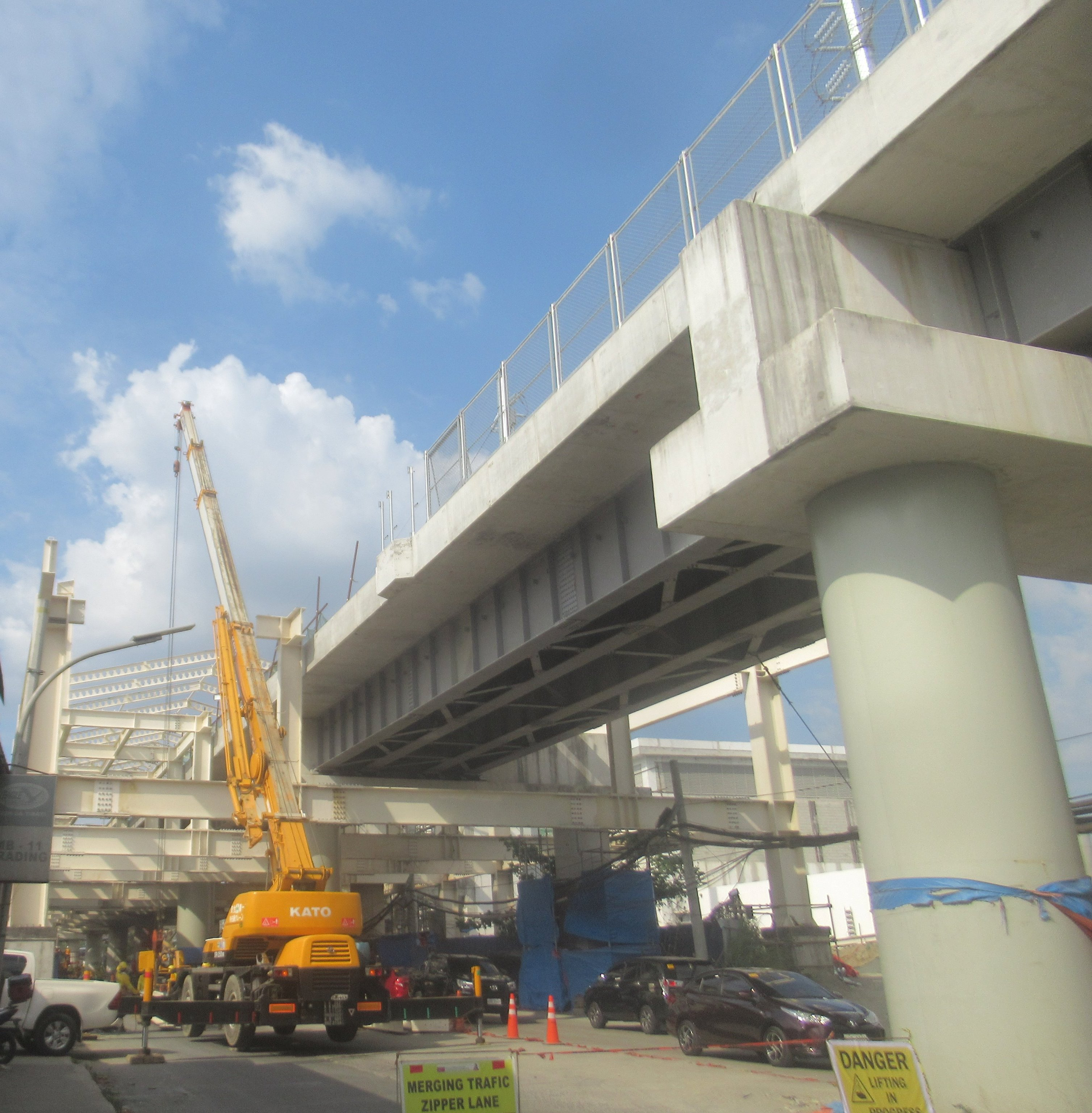
- Construction of Sacred Heart station as of May 2026

General information
- Location: Quirino Highway; Greater Lagro, Quezon City; Philippines
- Coordinates: 14°45′14″N 121°05′06.1″E
- Owner: SMC Mass Rail Transit 7 Inc.
- Line: MRT Line 7
- Distance: 18.584 km (11.548 mi)
- Platforms: 2 side platform
- Tracks: 2

Construction
- Structure type: Elevated
- Accessible: Disabled access

Other information
- Status: Under construction

History
- Opening: 2027

Services
Preceding station	Manila MRT	Following station
Quirino towards North EDSA	MRT Line 7	Tala towards San Jose Del Monte
Location

Sacred Heart station is an under-construction Metro Rail Transit (MRT) station located on the MRT Line 7 (MRT-7) system near Amparo Subdivision in Caloocan. It is also built adjacent to the MRT-7 Depot. Though its specific namesake landmark is unclear, it shares its name with the nearby Sacred Heart Villages and Sacred Heart Novitiate & Retreat House, both named after the Sacred Heart of Jesus, located around 2 to 3 kilometers (1.2 to 1.9 mi) away.
