= MRT Line 10 =

Proposed rapid transit line in the Philippines

Overview
- Status: Proposed
- Locale: Quezon City, Pasig, Taguig, Pasay
- Termini: Commonwealth Avenue; Ninoy Aquino International Airport
- Stations: 16

Technical
- Line length: 22.5 km (14.0 mi)
- Track gauge: 1,435 mm (4 ft 8 1/2 in)

The C-5 Metro Rail Transit Line 10, also known as MRT Line 10 or MRT-10, is a proposed rapid transit line in the Philippines. When completed, the line will be approximately 22.5 kilometers (14.0 mi) long, with 16 stations. The line would run along Circumferential Road 5, with a terminus at Ninoy Aquino International Airport, and another terminus in Commonwealth Avenue with a possible interchange with MRT-7 at Tandang Sora Station. The line would then run from Commonwealth Avenue through Katipunan Avenue, where there may be a possible interchange with LRT Line 2 at the Aurora Station in Katipunan Avenue. The line would then continue to NAIA along the aforementioned Circumferential Road 5. The planned location of the Line's Train Depot would be on UP Diliman Property in Diliman, Quezon City.

The project is expected to cost ₱92.58 billion, and is currently waiting approval of the relevant approving bodies.

== Stations ==
Line 10 would have 16 stations. The known stations are as follows:

Name	Structure Type	Transfers	Location
Commonwealth	Elevated	Tandang Sora	Quezon City
Magsaysay Avenue	Elevated		Quezon City
Carlos Garcia	Elevated		Quezon City
Aurora Boulevard	Elevated	Katipunan	Quezon City
Pedro Tuazon	Elevated		Quezon City
Santolan	Elevated		Quezon City
Calle Industria	Elevated		Quezon City
Ortigas	Elevated	4 Tiendesitas	Pasig
Lanuza	Elevated		Pasig
Pasig Boulevard	Elevated		Pasig
Kalayaan	Elevated		Taguig
Bonifacio Global City	Elevated		Taguig
Cayetano Boulevard	Elevated		Taguig
Bayani Road	Elevated		Taguig
Food Terminal Incorporated	Elevated	MMS Food Terminal Incorporated	Taguig
NAIA Terminal 3	Elevated	MMS NAIA Terminal 3	Pasay
