= Tala station =

Train station in Caloocan, Philippines

ML13	Tala

General information
- Location: Quirino Highway, Tala, Caloocan
- Owner: SMC-Mass Rail Transit 7 Incorporated
- Line: MRT Line 7
- Tracks: 2

Construction
- Structure type: Elevated
- Accessible: yes

Other information
- Status: Under construction

Services
Preceding station	Manila MRT	Following station
Sacred Heart towards North EDSA	MRT Line 7	San Jose Del Monte Terminus

Tala station is an under-construction Metro Rail Transit (MRT) station located on the MRT Line 7 (MRT-7) system in Tala, Caloocan. It is being built on the former site of Villa Alessandra, a residential development. It is expected to be complete by 2028.

Closest landmarks include the Metro Plaza Mall, Bermudez Polymedic Hospital, Ascoville subdivision, and Manuel L. Quezon Elementary School.
