= MRT Line 7 (Metro Manila) =

Manila Metro line

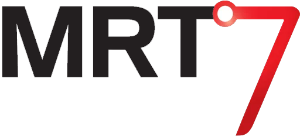
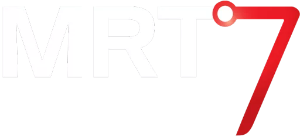

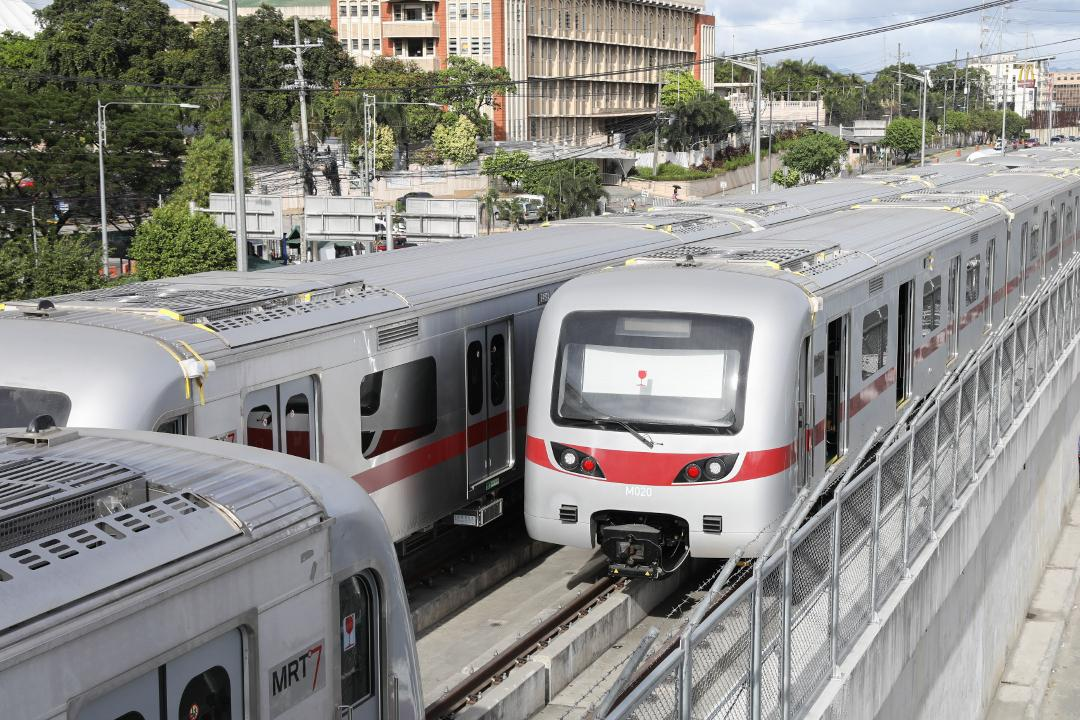
- Hyundai Rotem trains in 2021

Overview
- Status: Under construction
- Owner: Department of Transportation
- Line number: 7
- Locale: Metro Manila and Bulacan, Philippines
- Termini: North EDSA; San Jose del Monte
- Stations: 14

Service
- Type: Rapid transit
- System: Manila Metro Rail Transit System
- Services: 1
- Operator: SMC Mass Rail Transit 7 Incorporated
- Rolling stock: Class 000 EMUs
- Daily ridership: 300,000 (initial); 850,000 (design capacity)

History
- Work began: August 15, 2017; 9 years ago
- Planned opening: June 2027 (North EDSA to Sacred Heart) 2028 (Tala to San Jose del Monte

Technical
- Line length: 24.069 km (14.956 mi)
- Num of tracks: Double-track
- Character: Grade separated
- Track gauge: 1,435 mm (4 ft 8 1/2 in) standard gauge
- Electrification: 750 V DC third rail
- Average inter-station distance: 1.85 km (1.15 mi)

Metro Rail Transit Line 7 (MRT-7) is an under-construction rapid transit line across Metro Manila in Philippines, with its phase-1 with 14-stations on 22.8 kilometers (14.2 mi) route from Bulacan (San Jose del Monte) in the northeast to Quezon City (North Triangle Common Station in North Avenue) in the southwest expected to become partially operational in 2027.

MRT-7 will be expanded to a 200-kilometer (120 mi) network in phases, including a main loop-line as an extension of the present line, as well as several other phased extensions such as the New Manila International Airport Link, the West Rail Link, Manila North Harbor-North Avenue Common Station Link, etc.

== History ==
=== 1993–2015: early planning and delays ===
A route envisaged under the 1993 Traffic and Transport Management Plan, named Metro Manila LRT Line-4, with various alignment suggestions. on the suggestions of Japan International Cooperation Agency was later split into MRT-7 and the MRT Line 8 in 1999. On August 27, 2001, an early proposal of the MRT-7 project was submitted to the government, and in 2008 a subsidiary of San Miguel Corporation (SMC) was contracted to build the line.

In May 2012, SMC awarded the construction contract to the joint venture of Marubeni Corporation and DMCI, which was approved by the government of President Benigno Aquino III on 21 November 2013 on a public-private partnership (PPP) model.

=== 2016–2028: Phase-1 construction ===
On April 20, 2016, 15 years after initial development began the President Benigno Aquino III held the ground breaking ceremony, but the actual construction on the phase-1 22.8-kilometer (14.2 mi) line officially started on August 15, 2017. The project also includes construction of a 22-kilometer (14 mi) highway from the NLEX Bocaue Interchange, up to the proposed intermodal transport terminal (ITT) located near San Jose del Monte station. A plan to extend the line to Bocaue was also announced in 2019.

The Metropolitan Manila Development Authority temporarily closed several lanes of North Avenue and West Avenue from February to May 2026 to install a turnback steel box girder.

== Overview ==
=== Rolling stock & depot ===
There are 36 Hyundai Rotem trainsets or 108 train cars costing $440.2 million, configured into 3 cars per train set expandable up to 6 cars per train set, have been acquired. The trains will maintain an at-grade 20 hectares (49 acres) depot in Quezon City, capable of handling 150 trains sets.

=== Route ===
Route of MRT Line 7, showing stations and tracks that have already begun construction

The route has 14 stations with North EDSA as an interchange with the other metro lines such as the Line 1 and Line 3.

Legend
†	Future terminus

List of stations
No.	Station	Distance (km)		Structure type	Connections	Location
No.	Station	Between stations	Total	Structure type	Connections	Location
ML01	North EDSA †	—	0.000	Elevated	Interchange with Manila LRT Interchange with Manila MRT Out-of-station interchange with Manila MRT: MMS North Avenue; EDSA Carousel: 1 North Avenue; Bus routes: 18 33 64 SM North EDSA; Quezon City Bus Service: 4 Road 1 8 Trinoma	Quezon City
ML02	Quezon Memorial Circle	1.665	1.665	Depressed	Bus routes: 6 7 17 34 49 Visayas Avenue 6 7 17 34 49 Quezon City Hall; Quezon City Bus Service: 1 2 4 5 6 7 8 Quezon City Hall	Quezon City
ML03	University Avenue	0.837	2.502	Depressed	Bus routes: 6 7 17 34 49 Technohub	Quezon City
ML04	Tandang Sora	1.664	4.166	Elevated	Bus routes: 6 7 17 34 36 39 41 49 Tandang Sora 18 50 51 Luzon Avenue	Quezon City
ML05	Don Antonio	2.254	6.420	Elevated	Bus routes: 6 7 17 34 36 39 41 49 Ever Gotesco; Quezon City Bus Service: 2 St. Peter Parish	Quezon City
ML06	Batasan	0.976	7.396	Elevated	Bus routes: 6 7 17 34 36 39 41 49 Batasan; Quezon City Bus Service: 2 Maclang General Hospital	Quezon City
ML07	Manggahan	1.390	8.786	At-grade	Bus routes: 6 7 17 36 39 41 49 Manggahan; Quezon City Bus Service: 2 Litex	Quezon City
ML08	Doña Carmen	1.472	10.258	Elevated	Bus routes: 6 7 17 36 39 41 49 Puregold North Commonwealth	Quezon City
ML09	Regalado Avenue	1.145	11.403	Elevated	Bus routes: 6 7 17 36 39 41 49 Fairview Center Mall	Quezon City
ML10	Mindanao Avenue	3.416	14.819	Elevated	Bus routes: 6 7 17 20 33 36 37 38 39 40 41 49 SM Fairview (Nova Stop)	Quezon City
ML11	Quirino	0.800	15.619	Elevated	Bus routes: 6 20 33 49 Lagro	Quezon City
ML12	Sacred Heart	2.642	18.621	Elevated	Bus routes: 6 20 33 49 Amparo	Caloocan
ML13	Tala	2.625	20.886	Elevated	Bus routes: 6 20 33 49 Pangarap Tala Intermodal Transportation Terminal	Caloocan
ML14	San Jose Del Monte †	TBA	TBA	Elevated	Bus routes: 6 20 33 49 SM City San Jose del Monte	San Jose del Monte, Bulacan
Stations, lines, and/or other transport connections in italics are either under construction, proposed, unopened, or have been closed.

== Rolling stock ==
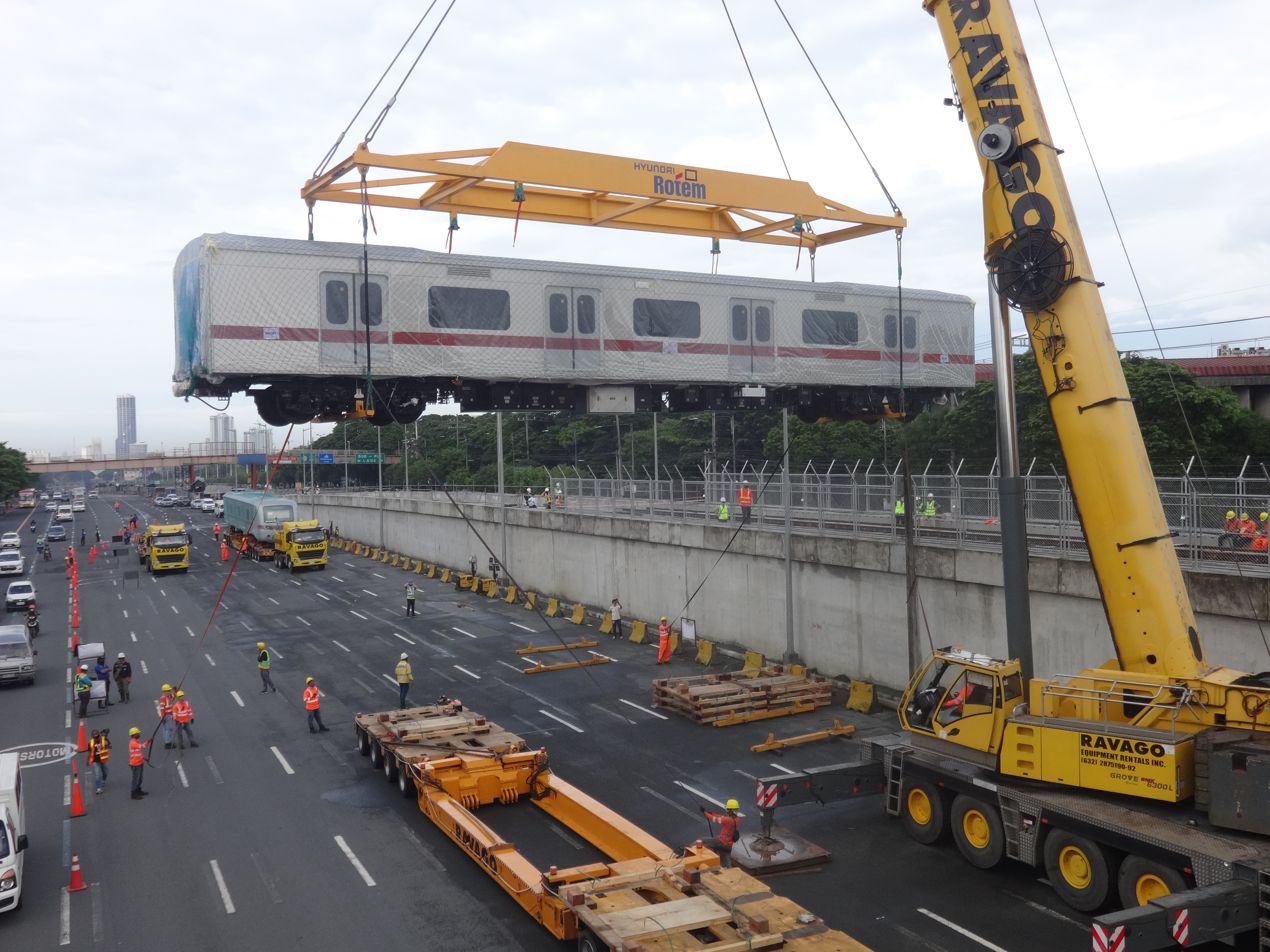
Installation of coaches.

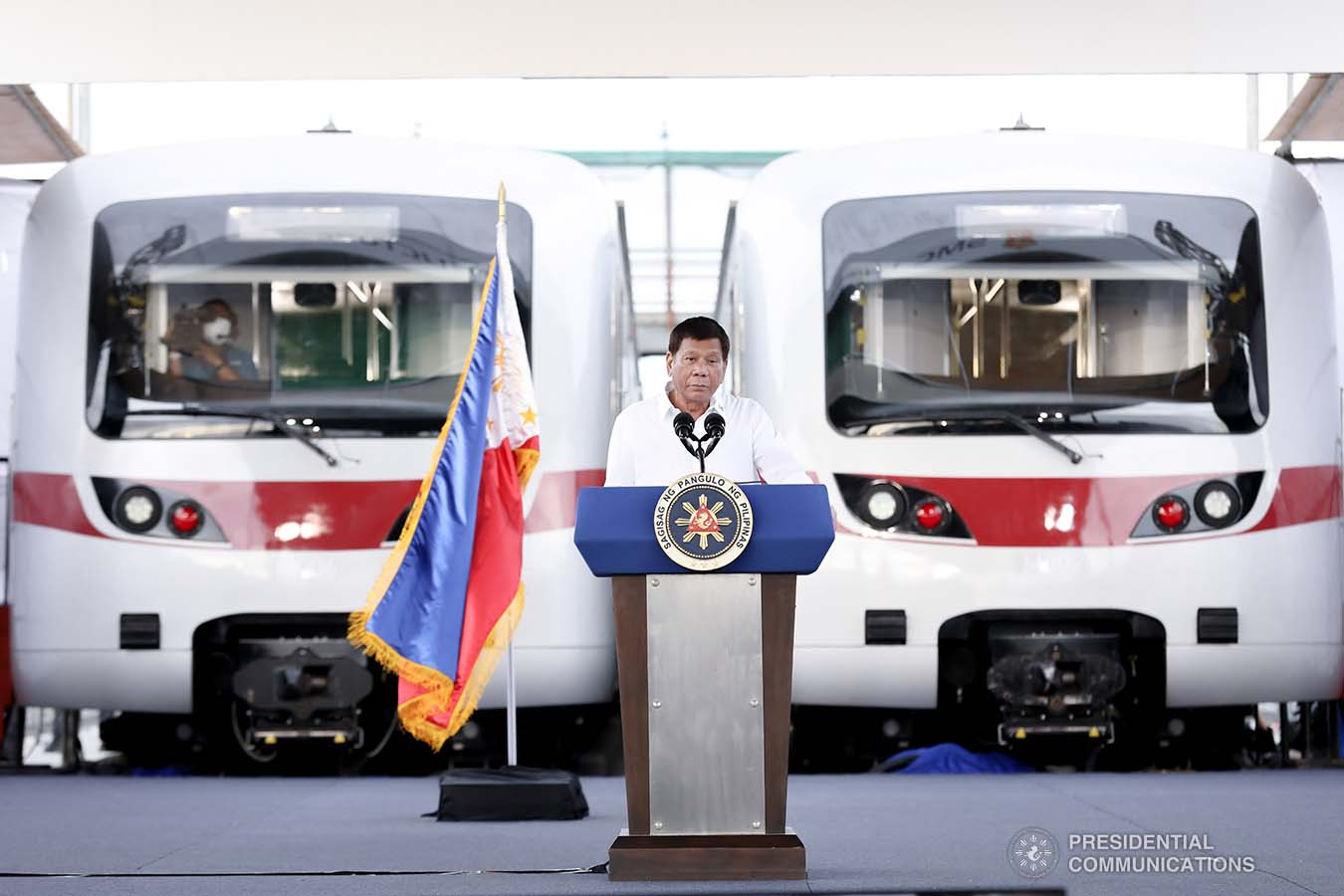
President Rodrigo Duterte during the unveiling of Hyundai Rotem EMU train sets for the MRT-7 along Commonwealth Avenue in Diliman, Quezon City on December 16, 2021

The line will be operated with 108 rail cars in a three-car configuration. Hyundai Rotem was awarded a $440.2 million contract to supply 108 metro cars, which will be configured into 36 train sets (3 cars per train set, with plans of expanding up to 6 cars per train set). The contractual scope also includes signalling, communications, and power supplies for the metro line. All ordered trainsets have undergone the necessary testing and trials. After being stored in South Korea since 2018 due to a lack of a depot, the 108 railcars are already in the process of being shipped to the Philippines.

The first batch of two three-car trainsets arrived in the country on September 6, 2021. The trains were then brought from the Port of Manila to Commonwealth Avenue and were laid on the tracks near the Tandang Sora station from September 11 and 12. On the other hand, the trains are seen to begin test runs by April 2022. As of December 2021, six trainsets were delivered and laid on the tracks near Tandang Sora station, with the latest deliveries of two trains that were laid in November 2021. The trains were unveiled on December 16, 2021. On November 22, 2023, a series of test trials were made for the train sets parked along Commonwealth Avenue, located between Tandang Sora Station and Don Antonio Station, while test runs within the North Avenue-Mindanao Avenue segment began on the 4th quarter of 2025. The test runs on December 1, 2023 were also overseen by SMC Chairman Ramon Ang, alongside officials from Hyundai Rotem, Korail, and Rhodium 688. As of March 4, 2025, 35 train sets, which consisted of 105 train cars, have been delivered into the country and are currently stored within the MRT 7 Depot.

Rolling stock specifications
Rolling stock	First-generation
Image	
Year	2018–2019
Manufacturer	Hyundai Rotem
Model	Class 000
Number built	108 cars (36 sets)
Formation	3/6 cars
Car Length	DM: 21.95 m (72 ft 0 in); T: 21.56 m (70 ft 9 in)
Train Length	65.46 m (214 ft 9 in)
Width	3.15 m (10 ft 4 in)
Height	3.75 m (12 ft 4 in)
Body material	Stainless steel
Weight	115 t (254,000 lb)
Configuration	DM1-T-DM2
Capacity	1,168/2,336 passengers
Doors	Pocket sliding; 4 doors per side
Drive unit	Gear coupling (WN) Drive
Traction power	750 V DC third rail
Traction control	IGBT–VVVF
Traction motor	200 kW (270 hp) 3-phase AC induction motor
Top speed	90 km/h (55 mph)
Braking system	Electro-pneumatic
Safety system(s)	ATP
Acceleration	1 m/s^{2} (3.3 ft/s^{2})
Deceleration	1 m/s^{2} (3.3 ft/s^{2}) (Service); 1.3 m/s^{2} (4.3 ft/s^{2}) (Emergency)
Gauge	1,435 mm (4 ft 8 1/2 in)
Coupling	Shibata close-contact
Status	35 trainsets (105 cars) delivered as of March 2025

== Future phases ==
=== Phase 2A (MRT 7 Extension) ===
Phase 2A will be an extension of the Phase 1 route to Tutuban station. The backtrack section from North Triangle Common Station is where Phase 2A shall begin from.

Station	Connections	Location	Nearest Landmarks
Del Monte	none	Quezon City	none
Delta	none	Quezon City	Capitol Medical Center, St. Mary's College
Roces	none	Quezon City	Fisher Mall, Amoranto Sports Complex
Santo Domingo	none	Quezon City	Santo Domingo Church, UST Angelicum College
D. Tuazon	none	Quezon City	Welcome Rotonda, National Labor Relations Commission
España	España	Manila	Trabajo Market
Lacson	none	Manila	University of Santo Tomas
Legarda	Legarda	Manila	San Sebastian Church, University Belt (Mendiola Street section)
Recto	Recto	Manila	Isetann Recto, Manila City Jail
Tutuban	Tutuban; Tutuban	Manila	Tutuban Center (Old Tutuban Station), Divisoria

=== Phase 2B (West Line) ===
Phase 2B will be an extension from Phase 2A from Tutuban station and an airport rail link to the New Manila International Airport.

Station	Connection	Location	Nearest Landmarks
Tutuban	Tutuban; Tutuban	Manila	Tutuban Center (Old Tutuban Station), Divisoria
North Port	Pier 4	Manila	North Port Passenger Terminal
C-2	none	Manila	Manila North Harbour
C-3	none	Navotas	Navotas Fisheries Port Complex
NMIA	none	Bulakan, Bulacan	New Manila International Airport

=== Phase 3 (Airport Access) ===
Phase 3 will extend the Phase 1 route from San Jose Del Monte station to Marilao, along with the planned six-lane highway connecting to the North Luzon Expressway in Bocaue, all of which are located in the province of Bulacan. Just like Phase 2B, it is also an airport rail link connecting the New Manila International Airport.

Station	Connections	Location	Nearest Landmarks
San Jose Del Monte	none	San Jose del Monte	Savano Park, SM San Jose Del Monte
Francisco Homes	none	San Jose del Monte	Starmall San Jose Del Monte
City Hall	none	San Jose del Monte	San Jose Del Monte New City Hall
Santa Maria	none	Santa Maria	Santa Maria Municipal Hall
Philippine Arena	none	Santa Maria	Philippine Arena, Philippine Sports Stadium
Marilao	Marilao	Marilao	SM City Marilao
NMIA	none	Bulakan	New Manila International Airport

=== Phase 4A (Southeast Main Line) ===
Phase 4A branches off from the "D. Tuazon Station" of Phase 2A and will extend to Taytay, Rizal with 10 new stations running on a northwest–southeast alignment.

Station	Connections	Location	Nearest Landmarks
D. Tuazon	none	Quezon City	Welcome Rotonda, National Labor Relations Commission
Araneta	none	Quezon City	De Los Santos Medical Center, St. Luke's Medical Center – Quezon City, Trinity University of Asia
E. Rodriguez	none	Quezon City	Christ the King Seminary, Barangay Mariana Park, Quezon City Sports Club
Gilmore	Gilmore	Quezon City	Gilmore Commercial Plaza, St. Paul University Quezon City
Greenhills	none	San Juan	Cardinal Santos Medical Center, Greenhills Shopping Center
POEA–Ortigas	none	Mandaluyong	EDSA Shrine, La Salle Green Hills, Philippine Overseas Employment Administration, Robinsons Galleria, Wack Wack Golf and Country Club
Meralco Avenue	4 Meralco	Pasig	Meralco Main Office, The Medical City
Pasig	4 Rosario	Pasig	Sto. Rosario de Pasig Church
Bonifacio Avenue	4 Cainta Junction	Cainta, Rizal	Robinsons Cainta
L. Wood	4 Tikling	Taytay, Rizal	Taytay Rotonda Monument
Taytay	4 Manila East Road	Taytay, Rizal	SM City Taytay

=== Phase 4B (Southeast Spur Line) ===
Phase 4B will be a spur line of Phase 4A from Meralco Avenue station to V. Mapa station with LRT Line 2, running mostly through Mandaluyong.

Station	Connections	Location	Nearest Landmarks
Meralco Avenue	4 Meralco	Pasig	Meralco Main Office, The Medical City
San Miguel Avenue	none	Pasig	The Podium, San Miguel Corporation
Shaw Boulevard	none	Pasig	Shangri-La Plaza, SM Megamall
Boni	Boni	Mandaluyong	Light Mall, Robinsons Forum
Barangka	none	Mandaluyong	none
City Hall	none	Mandaluyong	Mandaluyong City Hall, Mandaluyong Colosseum & Civic Center, Archdiocesan Shrine of the Divine Mercy
Primo Cruz	none	Mandaluyong	none
Panaderos	none	Mandaluyong	Kalentong Market, Puregold Kalentong
V. Mapa	V. Mapa	Manila	SM City Santa Mesa

=== Phase 5 (Katipunan Spur) ===
The last phase, Phase 5, will be a spur line with 9 stations connecting Phase 1 at Tandang Sora to Phase 4A at Bonifacio Avenue via an interchange with LRT Line 2 at Katipunan and Marikina-Pasig.

Stations	Connections	Location	Nearest landmarks
Tandang Sora	none	Quezon City	New Era University, Commonwealth Avenue
Balara	none	Quezon City	University of the Philippines Diliman, MWSS, Balara Filters Park
U.P. Town Center	none	Quezon City	U.P. Town Center, C.P. Garcia Avenue (UP), Brgy. Pansol
Ateneo	none	Quezon City	Miriam College, Ateneo de Manila University
Katipunan	Katipunan	Quezon City	Xavierville Avenue, Aurora Boulevard, Project 2 & 3
Riverbanks	none	Marikina	Riverbanks Center, Barangka, Provident Village
Sumulong	none	Marikina	Marikina City Hall, Amang Rodriguez Memorial Medical Center, Sumulong Highway
Emerald	Marikina–Pasig	Marikina	Marikina–Infanta Highway, Sta. Lucia East, Robinsons Metro East
Bonifacio Avenue	4 Cainta Junction	Cainta, Rizal	Ortigas Avenue Extension, Cainta Public Market, Robinsons Cainta

== Gallery ==
MRT-7 groundbreaking by then President Benigno Aquino III, c. April 2016.

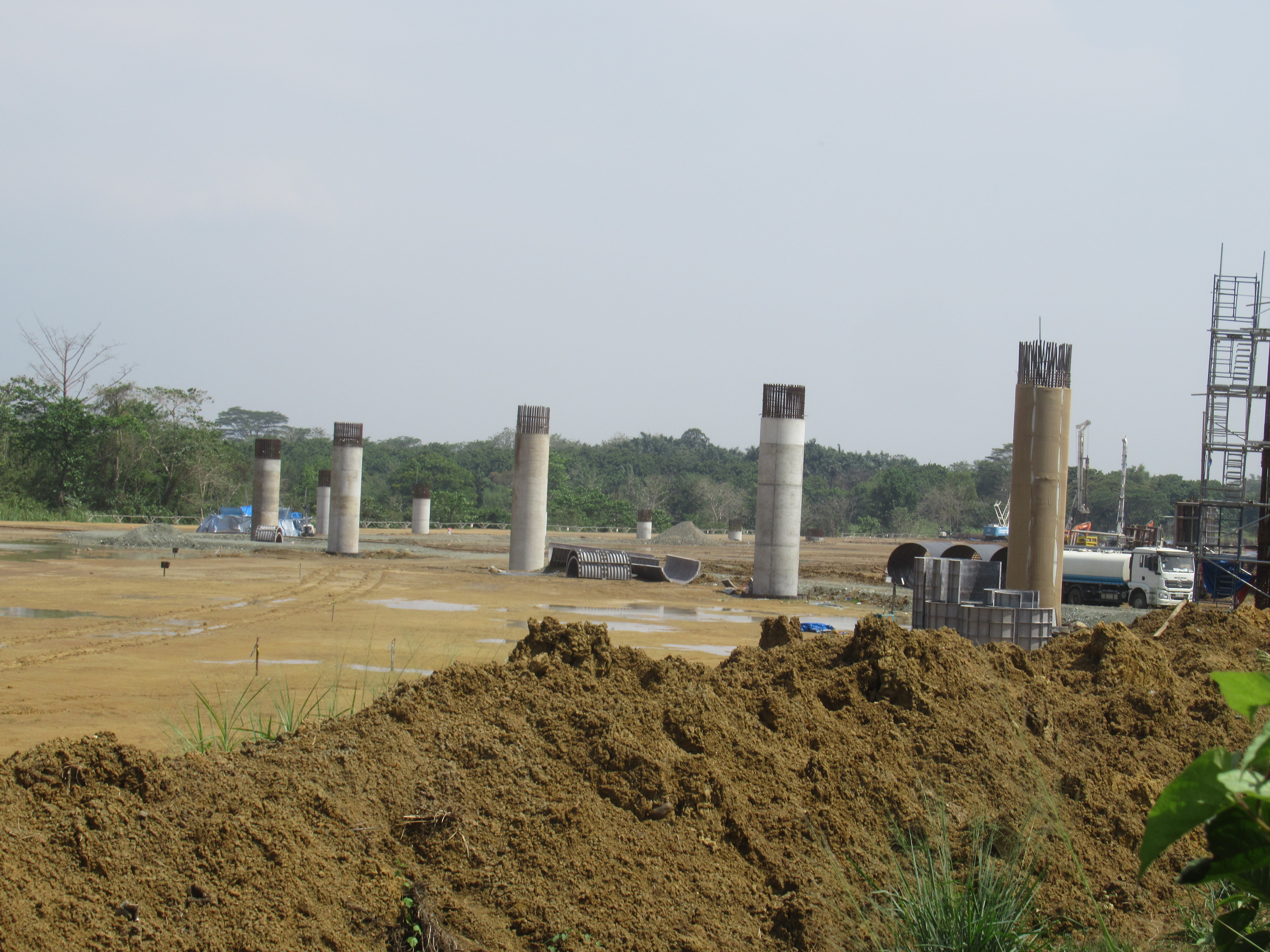
Under-construction MRT-7 Quezon City depot.

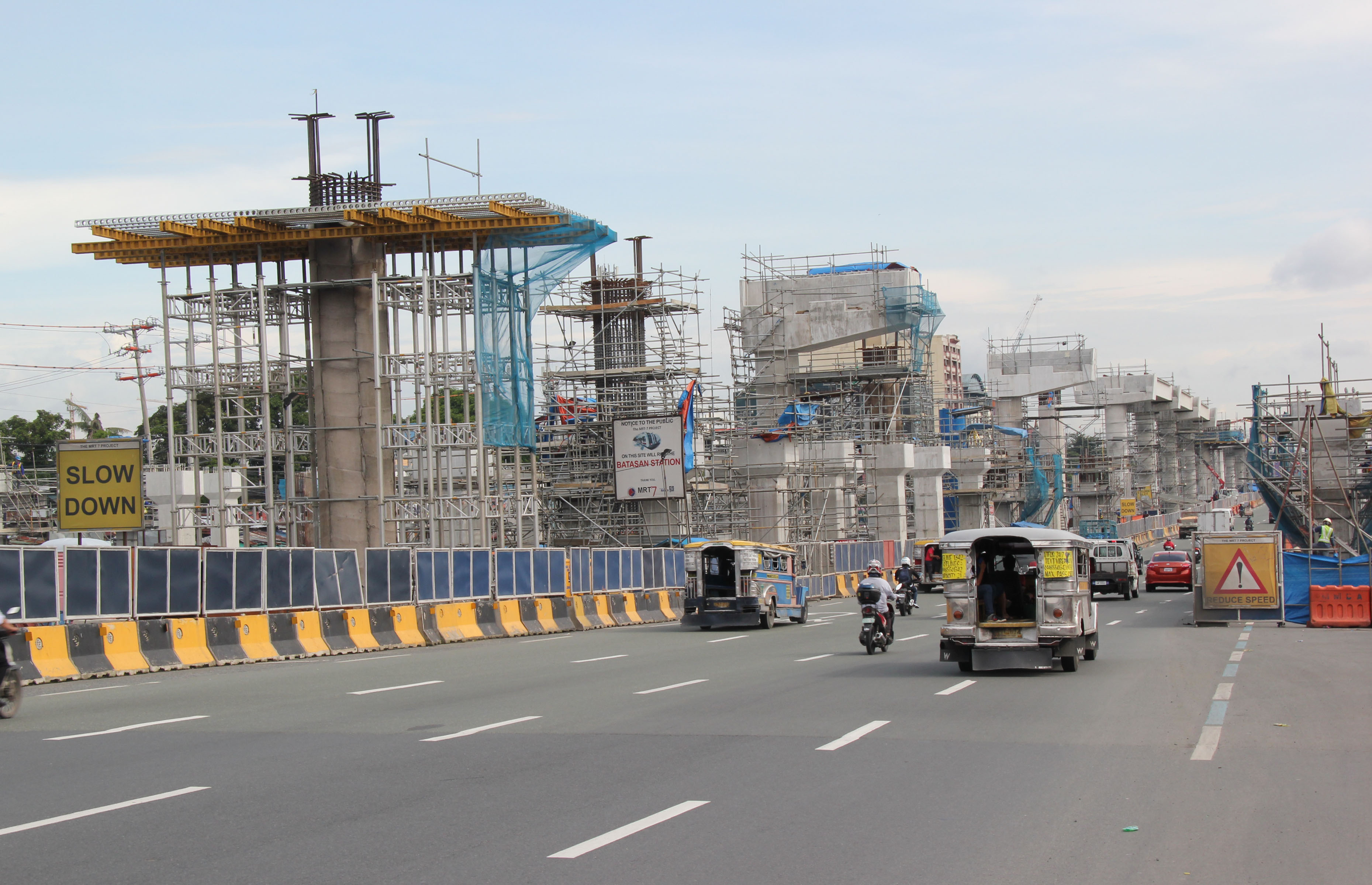
Batasan Station under construction in Quezon City, c. August 2018.

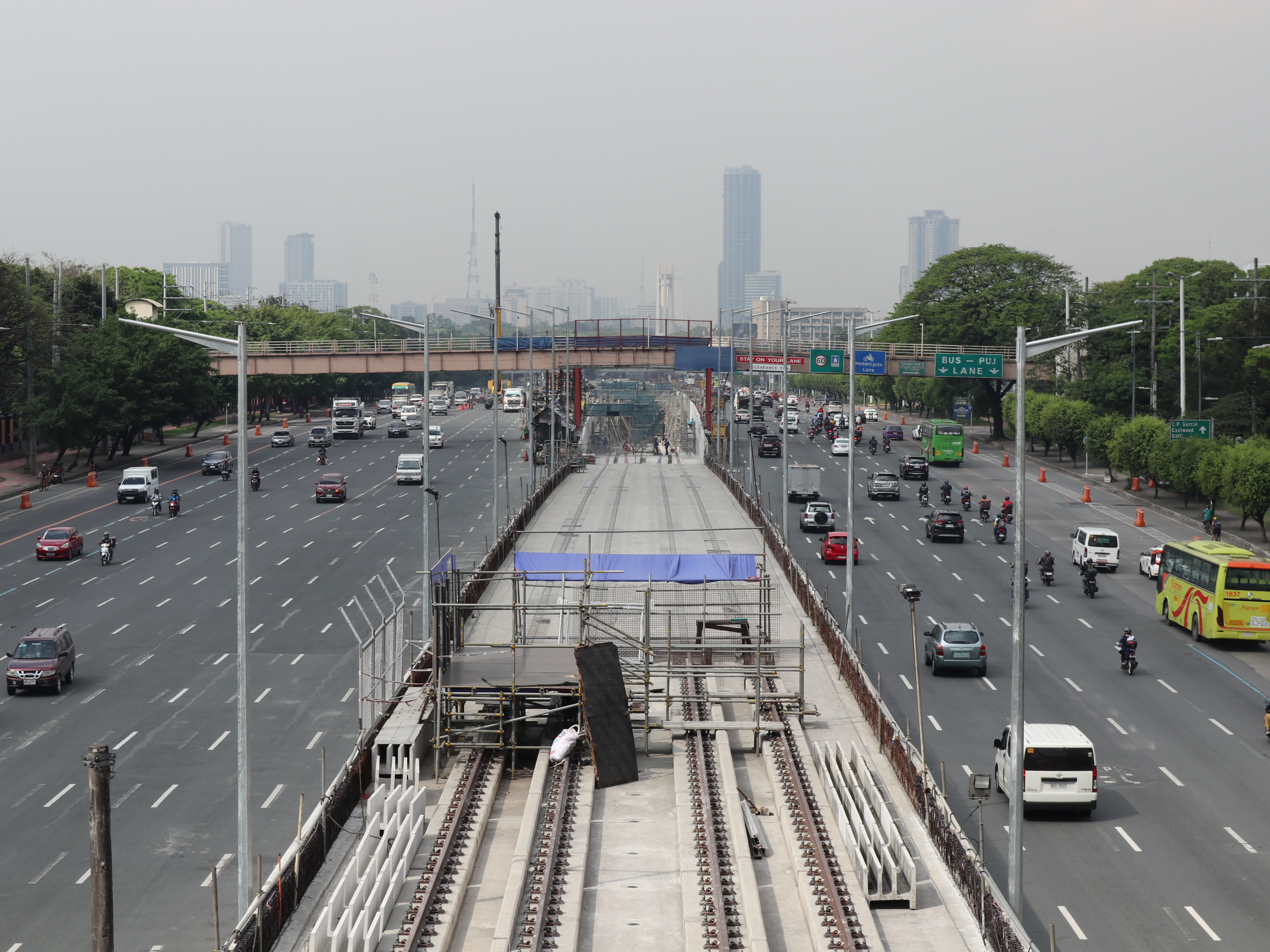
Phase-1 track construction along Commonwealth Avenue, c. March 2021.

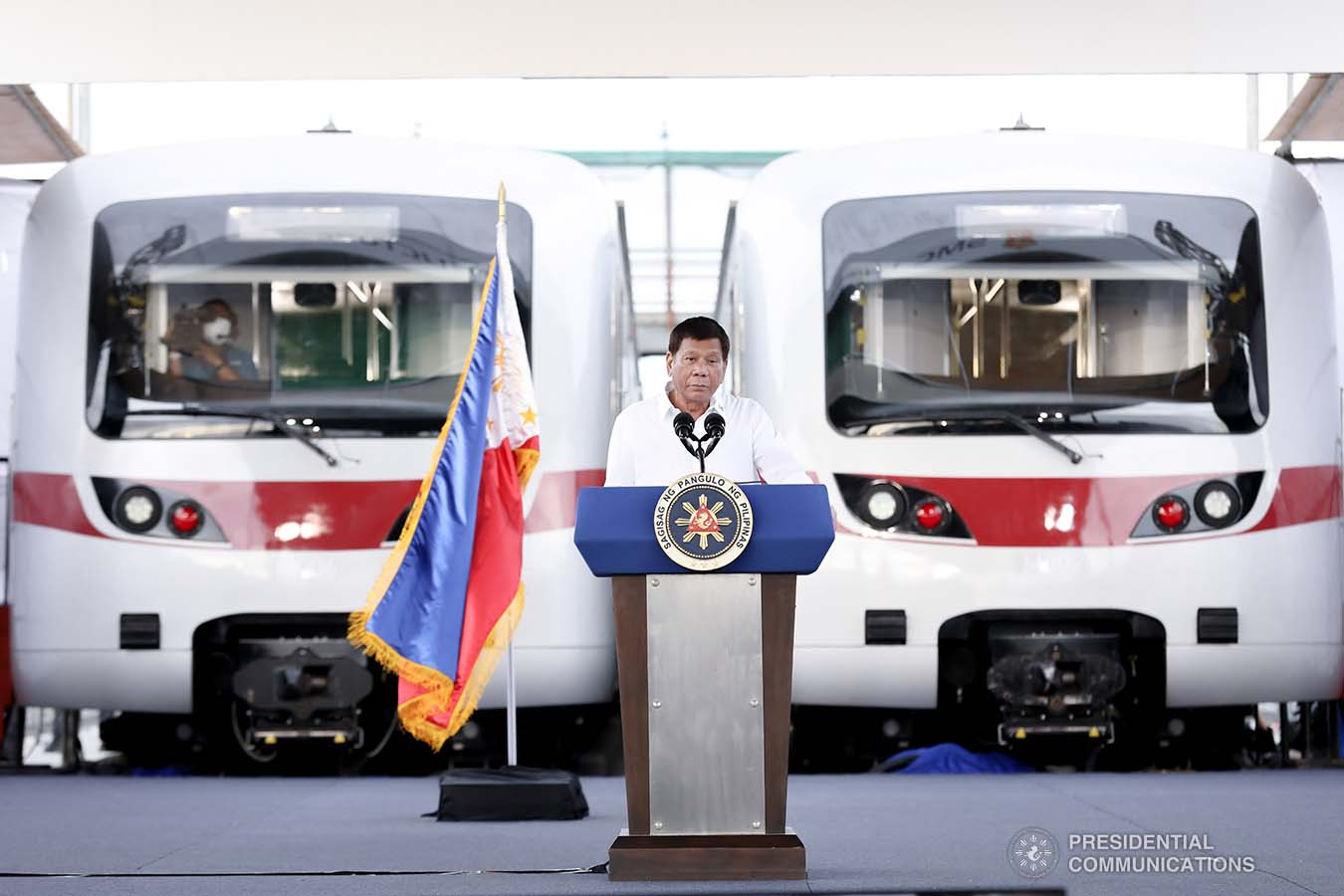
President Rodrigo Duterte unveiling the Hyundai Rotem EMU train sets for MRT-7, c. December 2021.

Trainset test run at Batasan station, c June 2025.

== See also ==
- Transportation in Metro Manila
