= San Jose Del Monte station =

Future train station in Bulacan, Philippines

ML14	San Jose Del Monte

General information
- Location: Quirino Highway, Tungkong Mangga, San Jose del Monte, Bulacan
- Owner: SMC-Mass Rail Transit 7 Incorporated
- Line: MRT Line 7
- Tracks: 2

Construction
- Structure type: Elevated

Other information
- Status: Under preparation

Services
Preceding station	Manila MRT	Following station
Tala towards North EDSA	MRT Line 7	Terminus

San Jose Del Monte station is a future Metro Rail Transit (MRT) station located on the MRT Line 7 (MRT-7) system in San Jose del Monte, Bulacan. It is the northern terminus of the line.

The original location of the station would be located near the area of Colinas Verdes, a subdivision in San Jose del Monte. The area formally known as Ciudad Real is split between the barangays Tungkong Mangga and San Manuel. In 2021, the project was realigned due to right-of-way issues. The site of the San Jose del Monte station was relocated to either near Colegio San Agustin–Bulacan in Tungkong Mangga, along Quirino Highway in San Manuel, or between Marcela Village and Marilao River, also in San Manuel. It was also considered to be located at the intersection of Quirino Highway and Fortunato Halili Avenue in Tungkong Mangga. Finally, the Department of Transportation and San Jose del Monte city government have agreed in March 2025 that the station would be located near the city's boundary with Caloocan, but under the following administrations, it was later moved north to Altaraza, near SM City San Jose del Monte in Tungkong Mangga.

The proposed terminus was planned to be in the proposed 200-hectare (490-acre) "Super City" Real Estate Development, which will be constructed by SM Prime Holdings. A 22-kilometer (14 mi), six-lane asphalt road will also connect the station to the North Luzon Expressway.
