= Manila Metro Rail Transit System =

Transit system in Manila

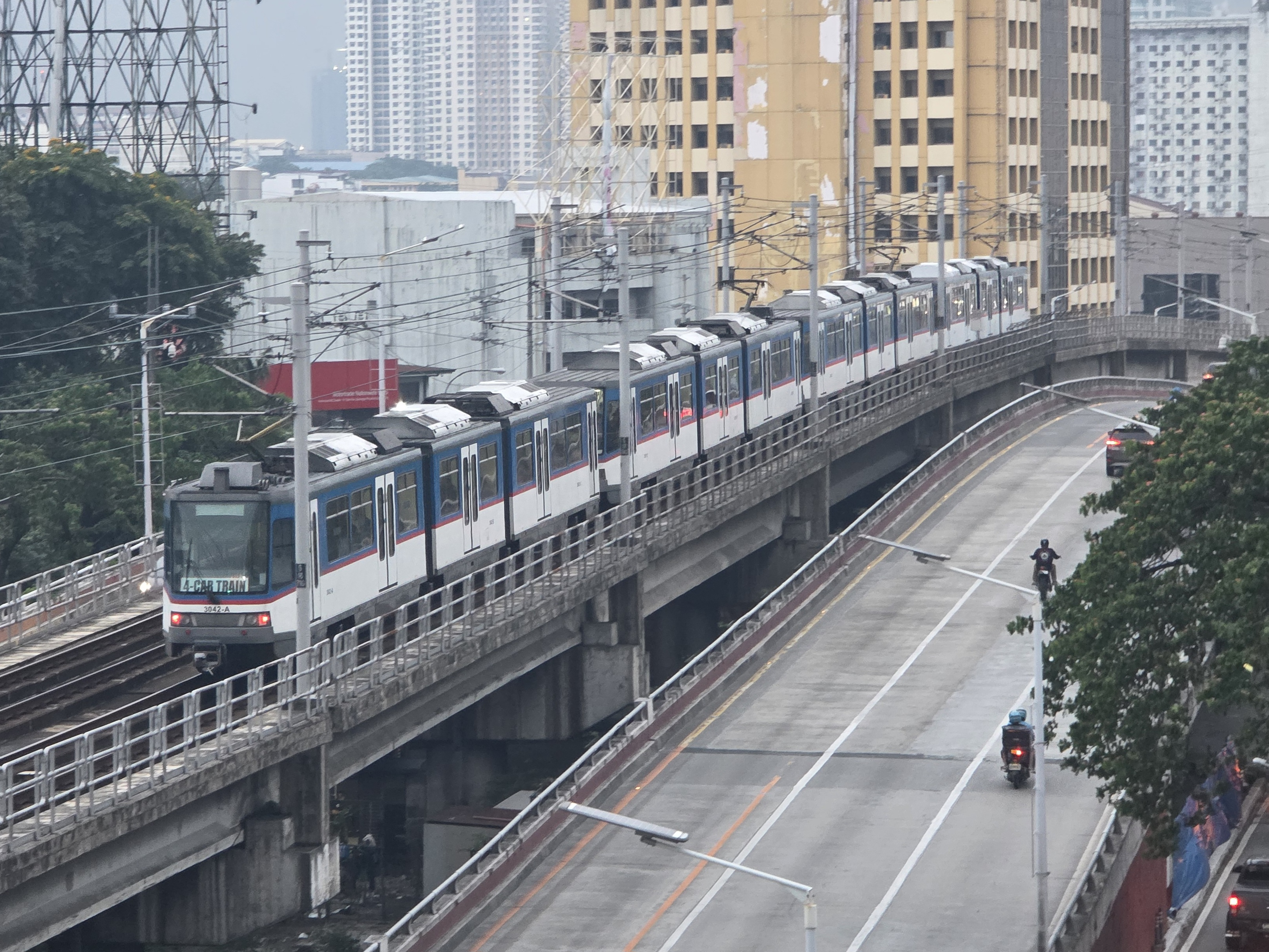
- Line 3 in 2025. It remains the only operational line in the system as of 2026.

Overview
- Owner: Government of the Philippines
- Area served: Metro Manila; Central Luzon
- Transit type: Rapid transit
- Number of lines: 1 (operational); 2 (under construction); 8 (planned)
- Number of stations: 13 (present); 145 (planned)
- Daily ridership: 393,407 (2025) (Note: Line 3)
- Annual ridership: 141,626,536 (2025)

Operation
- Began operation: December 15, 1999; 26 years ago
- Operators: Department of Transportation (Note: Most lines); San Miguel Corporation (Note: Line 7)
- Rolling stock: Class 3000 and 3100 Light rail vehicles Electric multiple units (Note: Line 9)
- Number of vehicles: 120 vehicles (operational)
- Train length: 3–8 cars (Note: 3–4 cars for Line 3, 8 cars for Line 9)
- Headway: 3.5–4 minutes

Technical
- System length: 16.9 km (10.5 mi) (operational); 373 km (232 mi) (planned)
- No. of tracks: Double-track
- Track gauge: 1,435 mm (4 ft 8 1/2 in) standard gauge
- Minimum radius of curvature: Mainline: 160–370 m (520–1,210 ft); Depot: 28–100 m (92–328 ft)
- Electrification: Overhead lines Third rail
- Average speed: 45 km/h (28 mph)
- Top speed: 60 km/h (37 mph)

The Manila Metro Rail Transit System, commonly known as the MRT, is a rapid transit system that primarily serves Metro Manila, Philippines. Along with the Manila Light Rail Transit System and the Metro Commuter Line of the Philippine National Railways, the system makes up Metro Manila's rail infrastructure.

As of 2026, the MRT's 16.9-kilometer-route consists of 1 line and 13 stations (in operation). The first and the only line currently in operation, MRT Line 3, was opened in December 1999 and completed in July 2000, currently owned by the Department of Transportation (DOTr), after the 25-year build-lease-transfer agreement between DOTr and the Metro Rail Transit Corporation expired in July 2025.

Since then, most of the newly proposed rapid rail lines within Metro Manila that are not under the jurisdiction of the Light Rail Transit Authority are associated with the "MRT" brand. This includes the Metro Manila Subway (Line 9) and the elevated Line 7 which are being built as of January 2023.

== Network ==
There is currently only one light metro/light rail line in operation but there are three heavy rail lines under construction. In recent years, there are proposals to extend the system. The system is intended to have seven lines as of 2019, with at least 49 stations across 124.4 kilometers (77.3 mi) of track. Until 2019, almost all proposed lines were given odd numbers.

Not included is MRT Line 7's proposed circumferential–radial network, as well as Lines 8, 10, and 11. These are still awaiting approval as of 2025.

The system is open from 4:40 a.m. PHT (UTC+8) until 10:10 p.m. on a daily basis. During Holy Week, a public holiday in the Philippines, the rail system is closed for annual maintenance, owing to fewer commuters and traffic around the metro. Normal operation resumes after Easter Sunday. During the Christmas and year-end holidays, the operating hours of the line are shortened due to the low ridership of the line during the holidays.

Line	Opened	Last extension	Termini		Stations	Type	Length	Ref.
Line 3	December 15, 1999	July 20, 2000	North Avenue	Taft Avenue	13	Light metro	16.9 km (10.5 mi)	
Line 4	2031 (projected)	—	EDSA	Taytay	10	Heavy rail	15.5 km (9.6 mi)	
Line 7	2027 (projected)	—	North EDSA	San Jose Del Monte	14	Heavy rail	22.8 km (14.2 mi)	
Metro Manila Subway	2029 (projected)	—	East Valenzuela	Bicutan	15	Heavy rail	36 km (22 mi)	
Lines and stations in italics are either under construction, not yet operational, or have been closed.

== History ==
=== Early planning ===
During the construction of the first line of the Manila Light Rail Transit System in the early 1980s, Electrowatt Engineering Services of Zürich designed a comprehensive plan for a metro service in Metro Manila. The plan—still used as the basis for planning new metro lines—consisted of a 150-kilometer (93 mi) network of rapid transit lines spanning all major corridors within 20 years. The study integrated two studies in the 1970s which recommended the construction of five heavy rail lines in Metro Manila, and another study in 1977 which was used as the basis for the LRT Line 1.

=== Initial construction ===
The first line, the MRT Line 3, began construction in October 1996 after the Metro Rail Transit Corporation, a consortium of local companies, was awarded a build-lease-transfer contract. In 1997, MRTC entered into a turnkey contract with Sumitomo Corporation and Mitsubishi Heavy Industries for the line's construction. Sumitomo and Mitsubishi subcontracted EEI Corporation for the civil works, while a separate agreement was signed with ČKD Tatra for the rolling stock. Funding for the project was sourced from loans from various banks in Japan and the Czech Republic, with the help of JP Morgan. The Department of Transportation and Communications (later the Department of Transportation) hired SYSTRA for the consultancy services, while the MRTC hired ICF Kaiser Engineers and Constructors to provide program management and technical oversight of the services for the design, construction management, and commissioning.

The line partially opened on December 15, 1999, and became fully operational on July 20, 2000. The line remains the only operational line in the system.

== Infrastructure ==
=== Stations ===
Most stations of the system are elevated, with some at-grade and underground stations. The stations have a standard layout, with a concourse level and a platform level. Most stations of the MRT Line 3 have side platforms. Line 3 stations have a standard platform length of 130 meters (426 ft 6 in), enough to accommodate four-car train operations, although the line is currently operating with three-car trains. The Metro Manila Subway will have a platform length of 210 meters (689 ft 0 in) to accommodate eight-car trains.

The platform and concourse areas are separated by fare gates. Concourse areas have ticket booths, customer service areas, and at least one stall serving food or drinks.

As of February 1, 2012, folding bicycles are allowed to be brought into Line 3 trains provided that the wheels do not exceed more than 20 inches (51 cm) in diameter.

Stations in the Metro Manila Subway will be equipped with platform screen doors.

=== Rolling stock ===
Presently, only light rail vehicles are operating in the system. Electric multiple units will be introduced when Line 7 and the Metro Manila Subway opens.

==== Line 3 ====
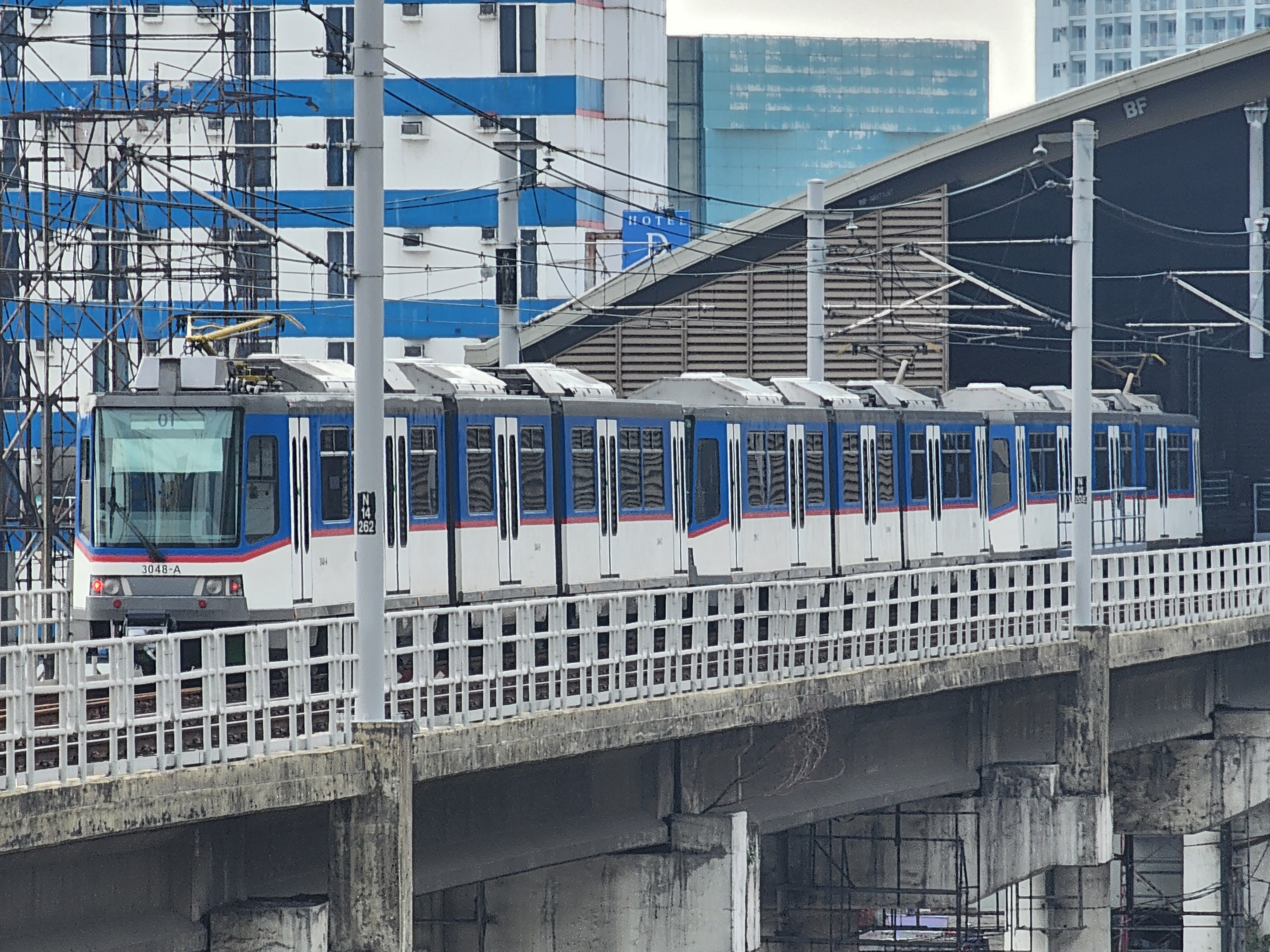
A train of the MRT Line 3

Line 3's rolling stock has a three-car length of 95.16 meters (312 ft 2 in), with each car having a length of 31.72 meters (104 ft 1 in) and a width of 2.5 meters (8 ft 2 in). The first-generation cars (numbered from 3000, formerly from 000), built by ČKD Tatra in Prague, Czech Republic, are currently being used in the system. The first-generation trains were refurbished from 2008 to 2009, 2017, and from 2019 up to 2023 as part of the MRT Line 3 rehabilitation project. The second-generation trains (numbered from 3100), built by CRRC Dalian in Dalian, China, were procured in 2014 and delivered from 2015 to 2017 to expand the capacity of the line. However, the second-generation trains were met with controversy, causing it to not be regularly deployed in revenue service. The issues with the second-generation trains include its incompatibility with the signalling system, and the trains' tare weight weighing more than the required weight in the bidding documents. Nevertheless, the trains underwent trial runs in 2018 and 2019, and were seen in regular operations from 2020 to 2021, and again since 2025.

Each car has a capacity of 394 passengers. A three-car train set can carry 1,182 passengers, while a four-car train can carry 1,576 passengers.

==== Line 4 ====
Trains on the MRT Line 4 will use heavy rail trains. The manufacturer of the Line 4 trains are yet to be determined.

==== Line 7 ====
Hyundai Rotem was awarded the contract in January 2016 to supply 108 electric multiple unit train cars, configurable to 36 three-car train sets. Originally slated to be delivered by 2018, deliveries would only begin by September 2021 due to the absence of a depot, in which construction could not commence due to right-of-way and expropriation issues. A three-car train set is 65.45 meters (214 ft 9 in) long. The trains are capable of operating at a six-car formation.

==== Metro Manila Subway ====
Like the trains on Lines 5 and 7, trains on the Metro Manila Subway will consist of electric multiple units. In December 2020, the DOTr entered into a contract with the Japan Transport Engineering Company and Sumitomo Corporation to supply thirty eight-car train sets, comprising 240 train vehicles. The trains will have a length of 200 meters (656 ft 2 in), with each car having a length of 20 meters (65 ft 7 in) and a width of 2.95 meters (9 ft 8 in). The trains will also be equipped with automatic train operation, allowing automated driving. The trains are scheduled to be fully delivered by March 2027. It would be powered from overhead lines with a voltage of 1,500 volts, similar to the Makati Subway.

=== Signalling ===
Various signalling systems are being implemented in the system. Fixed block systems are present in all lines except for some lines which use a moving block system.

The signalling systems across all lines have different suppliers. Line 3's signalling system was supplied by Bombardier Transportation. Line 7's signalling system, on the other hand, will be supplied by Hyundai Rotem, along with the communications system. The Metro Manila Subway will employ a signalling system based on communications-based train control provided by Nippon Signal.

One of the key components of the signalling system is the automatic train protection system, intended to maintain a safe speed and operation on trains. Line 9 trains would have a minimal functionality of automatic train operation. Some lines would have other components that works with the signalling system, like automatic train supervision, which directs train operations.

Line	Supplier	Solution	Type	Commission date	Remarks/notes
Line 3	Alstom (Note: Alstom is the successor of Bombardier Transportation, the original supplier of the CITYFLO signaling system. Bombardier Transportation was acquired by Alstom in 2021.)	CITYFLO 250	Fixed block	2021	Upgraded system with fiber optic cables and new lights
Line 4	unknown		Moving block CBTC	TBC	None
Line 7	Hyundai Rotem	unknown		TBC	Expected to be operational in the 2nd quarter of 2027
Metro Manila Subway	Nippon Signal	SPARCS	Moving block CBTC	TBC	None
Former
Line 3	Bombardier	CITYFLO 250	Fixed block	1999	Original system with copper cables; decommissioned by 2021

== Fares ==
Like the Manila Light Rail Transit System, the Manila Metro Rail Transit System uses a distance-based fare structure for all of its lines. Based on publicly available information however, the fares for the Makati Subway will be 20% to 25% higher than the fares of Line 3 and Line 1.

=== Ticketing ===
Two types of tickets consist: a single-journey ticket and stored value cards. Since the system's opening in 1999, magnetic tickets were used. The single-journey tickets are valid on the day of purchase, while stored value cards are valid for three months. The magnetic tickets have since been replaced with the Beep, a contactless smart card which is being used since 2015 in all Manila LRT and MRT lines. The Beep stored value cards are valid for four years from the date of purchase.

== Expansion ==
Since then, numerous proposals were planned to expand the system. As of 2025, there are three lines under construction.

=== MRT Line 7 ===
The MRT Line 7 is a 22-kilometer (14 mi), 14-station heavy rail line running in a northeast–southwest direction, starting from the San Jose del Monte station in Bulacan to the North Triangle Common Station in Quezon City. First proposed in 2001 and approved in 2004, the project was repeatedly delayed due to right-of-way issues. It was re-approved in 2013 and construction on the line began in 2017.

=== MRT Line 4 ===
The MRT Line 4 is a heavy rail line linking Metro Manila and the province of Rizal. It was first approved in 2015, and again in 2019 and as a monorail line. Construction on the 15.5-kilometer (9.6 mi) line is slated to begin by 2022, and full operations are slated by 2028.

=== Metro Manila Subway ===
The Metro Manila Subway is a 36-kilometer (22 mi) underground heavy rail line. It was first planned in 2000, and again in 2014. Funded by a loan from Japan, construction began in 2019 and is slated to partially operate by 2025.
