= Bicutan station =

Train station in Parañaque, Philippines

Bicutan
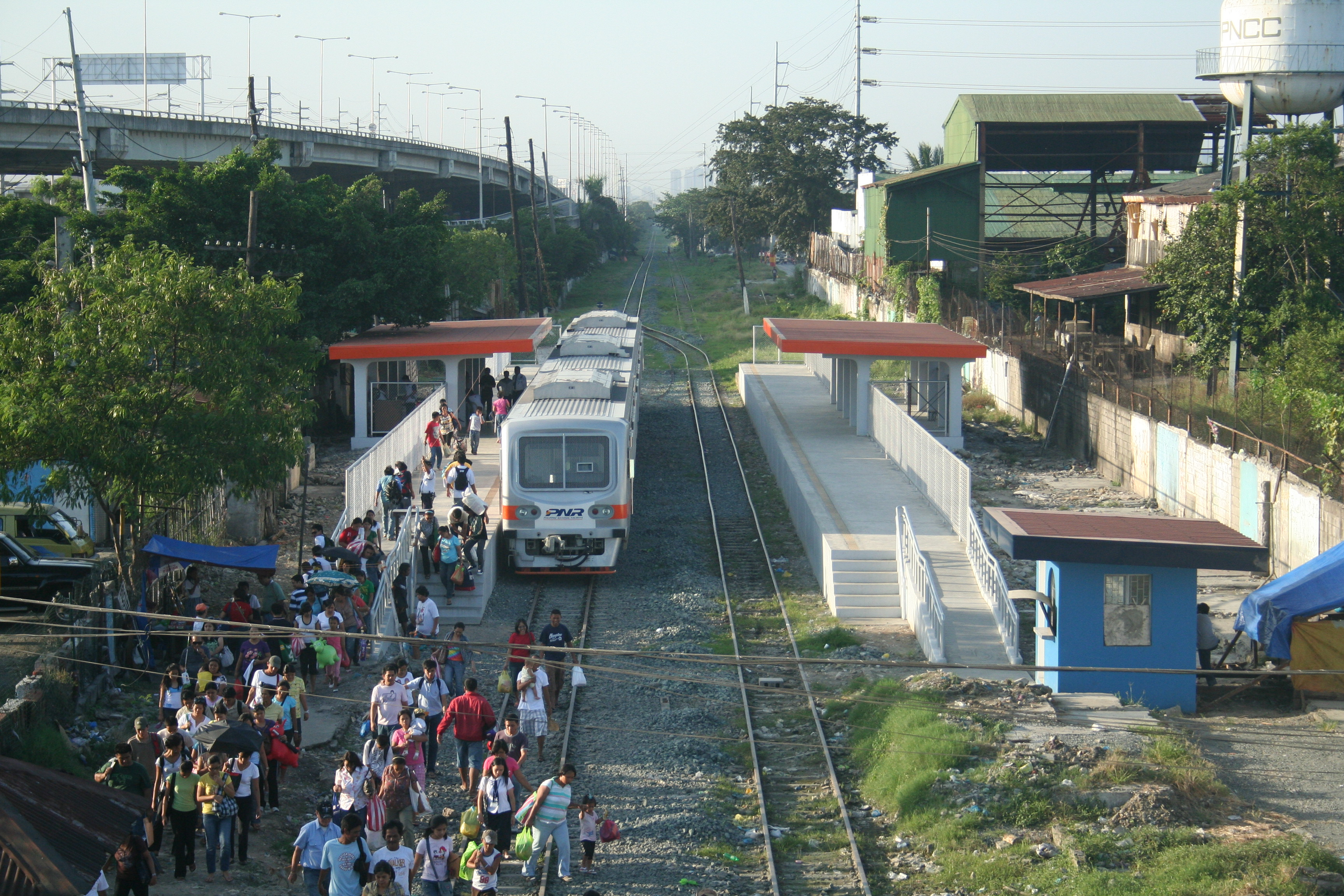
- Bicutan station in 2009

General information
- Location: General Santos Avenue, San Martin de Porres; Parañaque, Metro Manila; Philippines
- Coordinates: 14°29′14.94″N 121°2′44.56″E
- Owner: Philippine National Railways
- Operator: Philippine National Railways
- Lines: South Main Line; Planned: South Commuter
- Platforms: Side platforms
- Tracks: 2
- Connections: Jeepneys, tricycles, buses

Construction
- Structure type: At grade
- Accessible: Yes

Other information
- Station code: BL16 (Metro Manila Subway)

History
- Opened: January 19, 1977
- Rebuilt: 2009

Services
Preceding station	PNR	Following station
FTI towards Tutuban	Metro South Commuter	Sucat towards IRRI
Future services
Preceding station	PNR	Following station
FTI towards Clark International Airport	NSCR Commuter Clark Airport–Calamba	Sucat towards Calamba
FTI towards Tutuban	NSCR Commuter Tutuban–Calamba	Sucat towards Calamba
Preceding station	Manila MRT	Following station
FTI towards East Valenzuela	Metro Manila Subway	Sucat towards Calamba
Location
- Location within Metro Manila Location within Luzon Location within Philippines

Bicutan station is a railway station located on the South Main Line in Parañaque, Metro Manila, Philippines.

The station is the fourteenth station southbound from Tutuban and is the only Philippine National Railways station in Parañaque.

== History ==
The station was opened on January 19, 1977. It was renovated in 2009.

On March 28, 2024, station operations were temporarily suspended to make way for the construction of the North–South Commuter Railway. The station was subsequently demolished to be rebuilt as an elevated station. In July 2026, Filinvest Land Inc. donated its 6,000-square-meter (65,000 sq ft) parcel of land to the Department of Transportation to commence construction on the new NSCR station, which is expected to be completed in 2031. It will serve as one of two future interchange stations connecting with the Metro Manila Subway, along with FTI station.

== Nearby landmarks ==
The station is near major landmarks such as the Bicutan Public Market, the headquarters of the Department of Science and Technology, offices of the Philippine National Construction Corporation, SM City Bicutan, and Azure Urban Resort Residences. Further away from the station are the Polytechnic University of the Philippines-Taguig, Taguig City University, Camp Bagong Diwa, Walter Mart Bicutan, and the Upper Bicutan National High School.

== Transportation links ==
Bicutan station is accessible via jeepneys plying the Lower Bicutan and East Service Road routes, as well as buses plying the South Luzon Expressway route which stops at Bicutan Interchange. A northbound bus stop is located next to the station, while a southbound bus stop is located across the expressway. A pedestrian footbridge also connects to two terminals for tricycles, each going for nearby barangays of Parañaque to the west and Taguig to the east.
