= Philippine DanceSport Federation =

National sports federation of Dancesport in the Philippines

Philippine DanceSport Federation PDSFI
- IOC nation: Philippines
- Sport: Breakdancing, Dancesport

History
- Year of formation: 1996

Affiliations
- International federation: World DanceSport Federation (WDSF)
- National Olympic Committee: Philippine Olympic Committee
- Country: Philippines

The Philippine DanceSport Federation is a local organization in the Philippines that serves as the national governing body for competitive breaking and ballroom dancing. The group operates under the official recognition of the Philippine Olympic Committee and the Philippine Sports Commission. The World DanceSport Federation recognizes the organization as its sole national member body in the country. The federation regulates domestic competitions and selects athletes for international multi-sport events like the Southeast Asian Games. The federation maintains its headquarters at the PhilSports Complex along Meralco Avenue in Pasig City. The primary mandate of the group involves the promotion of competitive dance at the educational level and the administration of technical training programs for coaches.

== History ==
=== Dance Sport Council ===
The federation traces its origins to the ballroom dancing surge in the Philippines during the late twentieth century. Maria Rebecca Garcia played a primary role in the institutionalization of the sport within the country. Garcia encountered the Lambada dance style during a visit to Paris in 1989. Garcia opened the Becky Garcia School of Dance in Makati and brought foreign teachers to instruct local students.

She realized the need for a formal governing body to regulate competitions and standardize coaching methods across the Philippines. Garcia founded the Dance Sport Council of the Philippines Incorporated in 1996 alongside other dance practitioners. She established the Professional Dance Teachers Association as a supplementary entity to manage the vocational training of local instructors.

=== State recognition ===
The Philippine government officially recognized the contributions of the organization to national sports development in the early 2000s. President Gloria Macapagal Arroyo issued Proclamation No. 452 on August 28, 2003. This executive order declared November 3 to 9 of that year as National Dancesport Week to coincide with the first Manila International DanceSport Federation Open Championship. The government issued a similar decree through Proclamation No. 1171 in 2006 to support the national ranking competitions of the council. The international governing body officially accepted the Philippine organization as a full member on June 13, 2007.

=== Formalization ===
The federation underwent a major rebranding effort several years later to align with global standards. The council officially changed its name to the Philippine DanceSport Federation in 2019. This nomenclature adjustment aligned the local body with the branding conventions of the World DanceSport Federation. The federation expanded its structural scope during this period to include the street dance style of breaking. The International Olympic Committee added the breaking discipline to the Olympic program and assigned global governance to the World DanceSport Federation. The local federation absorbed the responsibility for managing the Philippine breaking national team as a direct result of this international policy decision.

== Mandate and objectives ==
=== Standardization ===
The federation works to standardize competitive rules and elevate the technical proficiency of Filipino dancers to international levels. The group seeks to provide systematic training programs for aspiring athletes from the elementary school level up to the elite national team. The organization mandate includes the expansion of the sport through nationwide grassroots initiatives. The federation aims to remove the elitist stigma historically attached to ballroom dancing by making the sport accessible to underprivileged youth across different provinces.

=== Integration to school curriculum ===
The inclusion of competitive dance in the Philippine educational system serves as a primary objective for the federation. The federation partnered with the Department of Education to integrate the discipline into the Palarong Pambansa school sports program. The federation acts as the technical arm for these school competitions and ensures strict adherence to international regulations. It provides exhaustive technical guidelines for these youth events across all participating regions. The elementary level allows one couple for the Standard discipline and one couple for the Latin discipline per region. The secondary level follows the exact same entry quota to ensure equal representation among schools.

== Functions and Services offered ==
=== Services to schools ===
The federation provides various administrative and educational services to its members and affiliated schools. The federation sanctions and hosts national ranking competitions on a quarterly basis to evaluate athletic progress. These tournaments allow athletes to accumulate points for national team selection and international deployment. The federation academy serves as the educational branch of the federation and conducts regular accreditation workshops for coaches and technical officials. These educational seminars cover syllabus updates and advanced adjudicator training methodologies. The federation issues official licenses to coaches who complete the required training hours and pass the technical evaluations.

=== Workshops ===
The federation coordinates with regional chapters and local government units to conduct these training workshops. The North Luzon Chapter partnered with the academy to hold a congress for coaches in La Union. The Camarines Sur Dancesports Association hosted a similar invitational workshop at the Capitol Convention Center in Pili. The Naga City Ballroom Aficionados organized an accreditation event. The Department of Education division in Misamis Oriental approved a federation workshop at the Limketkai Center in Cagayan de Oro City.

=== Knowledge transfer ===
The federation invites foreign technical experts to ensure local adjudicators meet international standards during major tournaments. The 2019 Midyear Ranking and Competition at the Valle Verde Country Club in Pasig City featured a panel of eight licensed foreign adjudicators. The panel included Irena Bous from Ukraine and Kumok Lee from South Korea. Chi Keung Mok from Hong Kong and Boon Lan Por from Malaysia also evaluated the dancers. Hsiao Chung Wang from Chinese Taipei and Tsuyoshi Yamaguchi from Japan completed the Asian contingent. Liudmila Zakrzhevskaia from the Kyrgyzstan and Drago Sulek from Slovenia provided additional international oversight. The breaking division events utilized specialized adjudicators including Myunghoon Baek from South Korea and Chih Chiang Liu from China. Ereson Catipon represented the Philippines on the breaking judging panel.

The federation also manages the logistical coordination for the national team during international deployments.

=== Training ===
The federation processes athlete registrations for sanctioned events and secures necessary funding from the Philippine Sports Commission. The group facilitates the entry of foreign coaches to conduct advanced training camps for elite Filipino athletes. The federation hired Polish coach Alina Nowak to prepare the national team for the 2019 Southeast Asian Games. The federation also funded a rigid training camp in Italy for the top national couples prior to the regional competition. The federation collaborates with local government units to organize regional festivals and exhibition matches. The City of Pasig and the City of Zamboanga regularly coordinate with the federation to fund the participation of local public school students in national tournaments.

== Governance structure ==
The Philippine DanceSport Federation operates as a nongovernmental sports association governed by a board of directors. The board, headed by the Chairman oversees strategic planning and policy implementation for all member chapters across the country. The executive leadership includes the President and Secretary General who manages the daily administrative functions of the organization.

Other members of the Executive Committee include the Treasurer who oversees the financial operations and budget allocations, and Sports Director who coordinates technical development programs for the registered athletes. Federation governance includes Adjudicators Commission, who maintains judging standards for domestic tournaments and a Breaking division that handles the integration of the urban dance style into the traditional federation structure.

The federation maintains a register of active athletes in the general category and reports active competitive couples. The federation also licenses three adjudicators with A Grade credentials across Latin, Standard, and Ten Dance categories.

== Milestones ==
=== Southeast Asian Games ===
The federation produced medal winning athletes in the Southeast Asian Games and other regional championships. The Philippine team achieved medal output during the 2019 Southeast Asian Games hosted in the country. The national athletes secured ten gold medals across various Standard and Latin disciplines. Sean Micha Aranar and Ana Leonila Nualla led the Standard category by winning three gold medals. The couple achieved a score of 30.150 in the Tango event to secure their first gold. They earned a score of 30.100 in the Viennese waltz event for their second gold. They also secured the gold in the Five Dance event with a total score of 151.350. Mark Jayson Gayon and Mary Joy Renigen added two gold medals to the national tally in the Waltz and Slow Foxtrot events. Gayon and Renigen scored 29.950 in the Waltz and 30.200 in the Slow Foxtrot to defeat their regional rivals. The pair also secured a silver medal in the Quickstep event with a score of 29.400.

The Latin division athletes matched the success of the Standard team during the regional competition. Wilbert Aunzo and Pearl Marie Caneda achieved a triple gold performance by winning the Samba, Cha-Cha, and Rumba events. Aunzo and Caneda scored 32.450 in the Samba and 31.650 in the Cha Cha. The couple secured their third gold with a score of 31.950 in the Rumba. Michael Angelo Marquez and Stephanie Sabalo secured the gold medal in the Paso Doble with a score of 32.400. Marquez and Sabalo also earned a silver medal in the Jive event with a score of 32.650. The performance of the team significantly contributed to the overall championship victory of the Philippines in the 2019 Southeast Asian Games.

=== Other competitions outside the Philippines ===
The federation athletes have also achieved results outside the Southeast Asian Games framework. Gerald Jamili and Cherry Clarice Parcon earned bronze medals at the Asian Indoor and Martial Arts Games in Ashgabat. The couple consistently represented the Philippines in the World Cup and the German Open Championships. Sean Aranar and Ana Nualla reached the final round of the Asian Championship in Vietnam and finished fifth overall among a highly competitive field of 28 couples. Jefferson Pimentel and Mary Desiree Seraga added a gold medal in the Jive dance during the Vietnam Dance Festival.

=== Local competitions ===
The regional affiliates of the federation have produced medals in domestic competitions. The DanceSport Team Cebu City performed exceptionally well at the 17th DSCPI National Dancesport Championship by capturing 16 gold medals, 9 silver medals, and 7 bronze medals. The team achieved this result with a lean delegation of only 19 couples. Edward Hayco founded the affiliate team and transformed a small group of three couples into an organization with thousands of members. The Cebu chapter utilizes the sport as a social outreach tool to divert youth from illegal drugs and petty crime. John Paul Mocorro led the medal rush during the national championship by winning four gold medals across the Junior and Youth classes alongside partners Therese Quilaton and Jam Flores. Andrew Ysla and Kathlene Diluvio secured two gold medals in the Junior C class for both Standard and Latin disciplines. The University of Makati and the Manuel S. Enverga University Foundation have also developed collegiate programs that regularly produce champions in the quarterly rankings.
