= Ortigas station (Metro Manila Subway) =

Subway station in Pasig, Philippines

Ortigas MMS
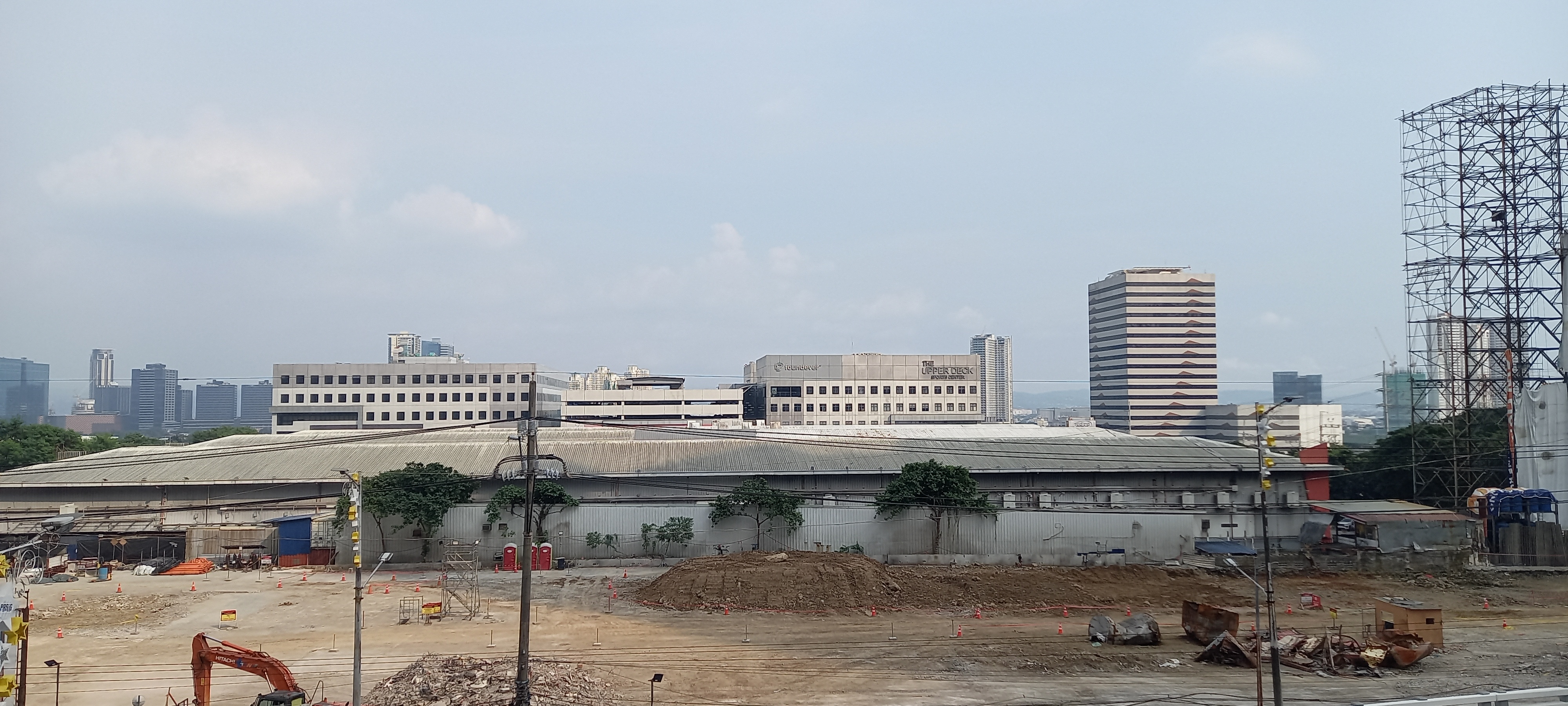
- The station under construction in December 2025

General information
- Other names: Ortigas Avenue
- Location: Meralco Avenue; Ugong, Pasig; Philippines
- Coordinates: 14°35′15″N 121°03′51″E
- Owner: Department of Transportation
- Operator: Department of Transportation
- Line: Metro Manila Subway

Construction
- Structure type: Underground

Other information
- Status: Under construction
- Station code: BL09

History
- Opening: c. 2032
- Former names: Ortigas North

Services
Preceding station	Manila MRT	Following station
Camp Aguinaldo towards East Valenzuela	Metro Manila Subway	Shaw Boulevard towards FTI or NAIA Terminal 3

Out-of-system interchange
Preceding station	Manila MRT	Following station
EDSA towards Magsaysay Boulevard	MRT Line 4 transfer at Meralco	Tiendesitas towards Taytay
Location

Ortigas station is an under-construction Metro Manila Subway station located along Meralco Avenue in Ugong, Pasig.

== History ==
The Philippine government announced the first 13 stations of the Metro Manila Subway project in April 2017. Among the 13 proposed stations was Ortigas station in Pasig, announced under the working title Ortigas North.

The Ortigas station broke ground on October 3, 2022, as part of the ₱17.75-billion Contract Package 104. The contract was awarded by the Department of Transportation (DOTr) earlier that year on April 22, to a joint venture between Tokyu Construction, Tobishima Construction, and Megawide. Construction began on September 3, 2025. It was delayed for three years due to right of way (ROW) issues.

The station is currently being built at Metrowalk, an eight-hectare commercial hub in Ortigas Center run by the Singson family's Blemp Commercial of the Philippines. Property demolitions had started by late October 2025 and were led by DOTR assistant secretary Irish Calaguas, who acquired the ROW from the Singsons. Once built, Ortigas station will span an area of 12,752 square meters (137,260 sq ft). Operations are expected to begin in 2032.

== Details ==
Ortigas station runs along Meralco Avenue in barangay Ugong, Pasig. It will also be connected to Meralco station of the MRT Line 4.
