= Bonifacio Global City station =

Station on the Metro Manila Subway

Bonifacio Global City MMS

General information
- Location: McKinley Parkway, Bonifacio Global City, Brgy. Fort Bonifacio, Taguig City , Metro Manila; Philippines
- Coordinates: 14°32′58″N 121°03′17″E
- Owner: Department of Transportation
- Operator: Department of Transportation
- Line: Metro Manila Subway
- Tracks: 2
- Connections: Buses and Jeepneys

Construction
- Structure type: Underground
- Accessible: Yes

Other information
- Status: Under construction
- Station code: BL12

History
- Opening: c. 2032

Services
| Preceding station | Manila MRT | Following station |
|---|---|---|
| Kalayaan Avenue towards East Valenzuela | Metro Manila Subway | Lawton Avenue towards FTI or NAIA Terminal 3 |
Location

Bonifacio Global City station is an under-construction station of the Metro Manila Subway . The station will serve the central portion of the Bonifacio Global City business district in Taguig City. The station is located underneath McKinley Parkway, between the Serendra condominium complex and Market! Market!

It is the twelfth station for trains headed northbound towards East Valenzuela, the fourth station for trains headed southbound to NAIA Terminal 3, and the fifth station for southbound trains going to Bicutan.

== History ==
A railway station intended to serve Bonifacio Global City was included as a subway route option in the Japan International Cooperation Agency's information collection report regarding the Mega Manila Subway project proposal in 2015. The station's inclusion in the final route of the Metro Manila Subway was finalized in the project's approval in 2019.

After years of no significant movement, The Department of Transportation announced that the joint venture of D.M. Consunji Inc. and Nishimatsu Construction Co. Ltd was awarded the contract for CP-105, which covers this station, Kalayaan Avenue station, and subway tunnels between them measuring 0.66 kilometers.

On February 5, 2026, the Bases Conversion Development Authority and the Department of Transportation signed an agreement to secure the right of way of the subway within BCDA's properties, which includes this station, Kalayaan Avenue station, and Senate-DepEd station. A week later on February 13, President Bongbong Marcos ceremonially broke ground on the construction of the CP-105 stations. Since the site of the station has numerous trees and greenery, the Department of Environment and Natural Resources issued an extension of the special tree-cutting and earth balling permit it gave the Department of Transportation on June 2026. The station projected to be operational alongside the full subway line by 2032.

== Nearby landmarks ==
The station, as indicated by its name, is within the premier business district of the country, Bonifacio Global City. The station's nearest landmarks are the Serendra condominiums and Market! Market!. The station is also a few meters away from SM Aura, The Headquarters of Victory Church, Bonifacio High Street, and the BGC Campus of STI College, as well as numerous office towers and recreation spots.

== Transportation links ==
The station is accessible by jeepneys plying routes along Mckinley Parkway. It is also very close to the Transport Terminal of Market! Market!, where the BGC Bus connects to the rest of the CBD and the Makati CBD, while other buses, UV Express, and jeepneys connect the station to different parts of Mega Manila.
