= Kalayaan Avenue station =

Station in Metro Manila, Philippines

Kalayaan Avenue MMS

General information
- Location: 11th Avenue cor. 38th Street, Bonifacio Global City, Brgy. Fort Bonifacio, Taguig City , Metro Manila; Philippines
- Coordinates: 14°33′30″N 121°03′22″E
- Owner: Department of Transportation
- Operator: Department of Transportation
- Line: Metro Manila Subway
- Tracks: 2
- Connections: Jeepneys

Construction
- Structure type: Underground
- Accessible: Yes

Other information
- Status: Under construction
- Station code: BL11

History
- Opening: c. 2032

Services
Preceding station	Manila MRT	Following station
Shaw Boulevard towards East Valenzuela	Metro Manila Subway	Bonifacio Global City towards FTI or NAIA Terminal 3
Location

Kalayaan Avenue station is an under-construction station of the Metro Manila Subway . The station will serve the northern outskirts of the Bonifacio Global City business district, as well as the residential communities and businesses along Kalayaan Avenue in Taguig City. The station is named after nearby Kalayaan Avenue, but is located a few blocks away inside Bonifacio Global City.

It is the eleventh station for trains headed northbound towards East Valenzuela, the fifth station for trains headed southbound to NAIA Terminal 3, and the sixth station for southbound trains going to Bicutan.

== History ==
A railway station intended to serve the Kalayaan Avenue area was included as a route option in the Japan International Cooperation Agency's information collection report regarding the Mega Manila Subway project proposal in 2015. The station's inclusion in the final route of the Metro Manila Subway was finalized in the project's approval in 2019.

After years of no significant movement, The Department of Transportation announced that the joint venture of D.M. Consunji Inc. and Nishimatsu Construction Co. Ltd was awarded the contract for CP-105, which covers this station, Bonifacio Global City station, and subway tunnels between them measuring 0.66 kilometers.

On February 5, 2026, the Bases Conversion Development Authority and the Department of Transportation signed an agreement to secure the right of way of the subway within BCDA's properties, which includes Kalayaan Avenue, Bonifacio Global City, and Senate-DepEd stations. A week later on February 13, President Bongbong Marcos ceremonially broke ground on the construction of the CP-105 stations at the site of Kalayaan Avenue station. The station projected to be operational alongside the full subway line by 2032.

== Nearby landmarks ==
The station, despite its name, is within the premier business district of the country, Bonifacio Global City. The station's nearest landmarks are the Uptown Bonifacio developments, JPMorgan Chase Center, and The Palace. The station is also a few meters away from Mitsukoshi Mall, Saint Michael the Archangel Parish, and the DLSU Rufino Campus, as well as numerous office towers and recreation spots. The general area of the station is also home to the University of Makati, Makati City Jail, Makati Science High School, International School Manila, British School Manila, and Taguig People's Park, as well as the country's current tallest building, Metrobank Center.

== Transportation links ==
The station is accessible by jeepneys plying routes along 38th Street. It is also very close to Kalayaan Avenue, where UV Express and jeepneys connect the station to stops in Makati, Pasig, Pateros, Taguig, Cainta, Taytay and Antipolo.
