= Marco Polo Ortigas Manila =

Hotel in Pasig, Philippines

- 马尼拉奥迪加斯马哥孛罗酒店

- Interactive map of the Marco Polo Ortigas Manila area

General information
- Status: Completed
- Location: Ortigas Center, Pasig, Philippines
- Coordinates: 14°35′14.9″N 121°03′48.3″E
- Construction started: October 2010
- Opening: July 9, 2014; 12 years ago
- Cost: ₱3 billion
- Owner: Xin Tian TI Development Corporation
- Operator: Marco Polo Hotels

Height
- Height: 180 meters (590 ft)

Technical details
- Floor count: 44 aboveground + 4 underground
- Floor area: 51,198 m^{2} (551,090 sq ft)

Design and construction
- Architecture firm: MOHRI, Architect & Associates
- Other designers: GLYPH Design Studio (interior design)

Other information
- Number of rooms: 316
- Number of restaurants: 3
- Number of bars: 1
- Public transit: Future: MMS Ortigas; 4 Meralco

Website
- http://www.marcopolohotels.com/

Marco Polo Ortigas Manila (Chinese: 马尼拉奥迪加斯马哥孛罗酒店; pinyin: Mǎnílā Àodíjiāsī Mǎgē Bèiluō Jiǔdiàn) is a hotel and office building at the Ortigas Center in Pasig, Metro Manila, Philippines.

== Construction ==
First SLP Holdings through its unit Xin Tian TI Development Corporation agreed in May 2012 with the Marco Polo Hotels Group to build the Marco Polo Ortigas Manila.

The groundbreaking ceremony was held on December 10, 2010. The cost of the hotel project was ₱3 billion. President Benigno Aquino III opened the Marco Polo Ortigas Manila on July 9, 2014.

== Architecture and design ==
The architectural design of the hotel building was done by Japan-based firm MOHRI, Architect & Associates while The interior design of the hotel was done by Canada-based GLYPH Design Studio. The building is 180 meters (590 ft) high, with 44 stories and 4 underground levels.

== Features ==
Marco Polo Ortigas Manila has 316 hotel rooms and suites which include two Continental Club floors. Dining outlets hosted inside the hotel is Cucina, an all-day dining restaurant, Lung Hin, a Cantonese restaurant, Café Pronto, a coffee venue and VU's, a sky bar and lounged at the 45th (sic) floor of the hotel. The hotel rooms and amenities are situated on the top 20 of its 41 floors, leading to the claim that it is the first "sky hotel". The hotel also has ten event venues: the Grand Ballroom on the 7th floor and nine meeting rooms on the 9th floor.

Meanwhile, office spaces are located on its 11th to 20th floors. Accessible through Sapphire Road, parking is located in the building's four basement levels for the offices and on the 2nd through 6th floors for hotel guests.

== Reception ==
In 2016, the management of Marco Polo Ortigas Hotel was awarded the 2015 Spirit of Marco Polo Best Guest Experience Award, and the hotel was given a 5-star accreditation by the Department of Tourism.
