= Quirino station =

Quirino station may refer to the following stations in the Philippines:

- Quirino station (LRT), a LRT Line 1 station in Manila
- Quirino station (MRT), a MRT Line 7 station in Quezon City
- Quirino Highway station, a Metro Manila Subway station in Quezon City
