= Metrowalk =

Business district in Pasig, Philippines

Coordinates: 14°35′14″N 121°03′52″E

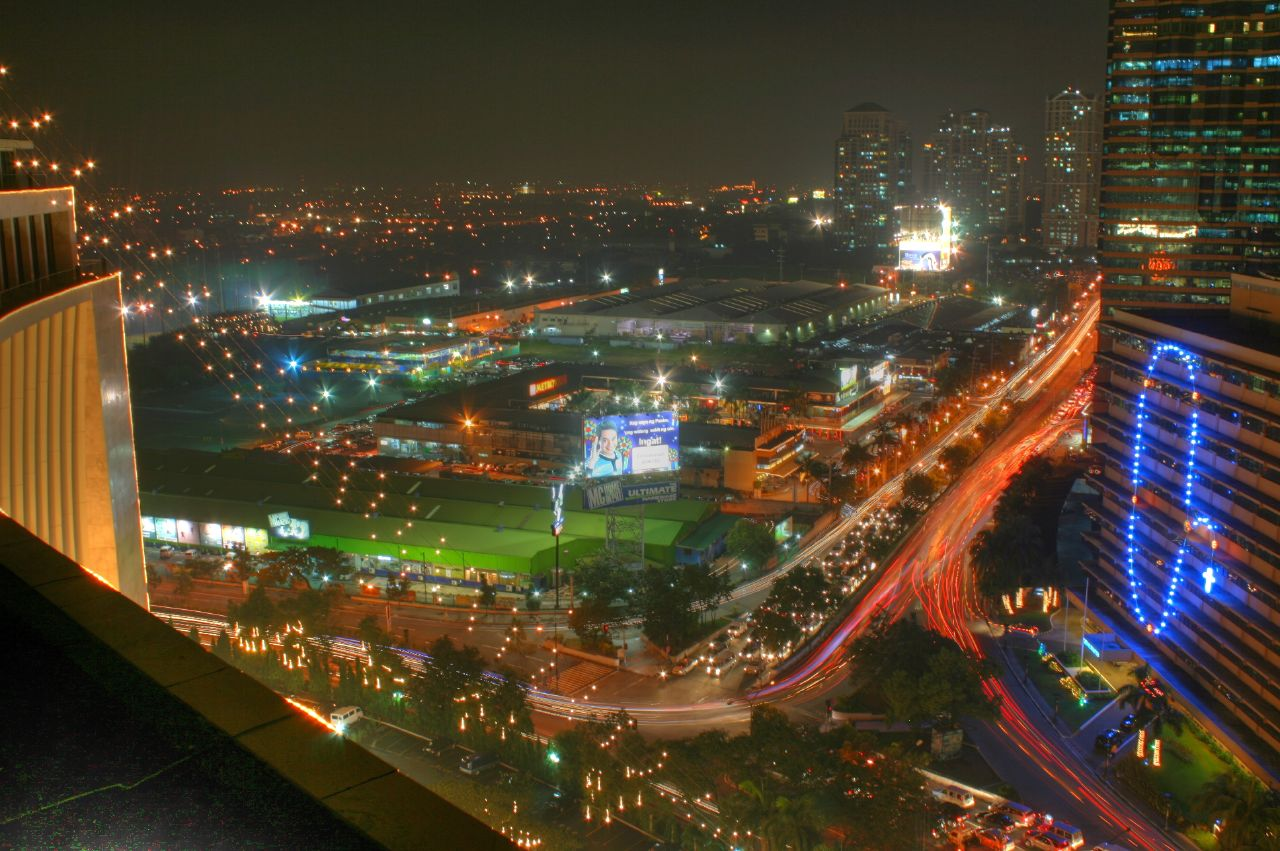
Metrowalk as seen from Meralco Theater

Metrowalk is a commercial hub in Pasig in the Philippines. It is located on a 5,000 square meters (54,000 sq ft) parcel of land at the junction of Ortigas and Meralco Avenues in the Ortigas Center central business district of the metro. Shops, restaurants, nightlife bars, and pirated media markets were present in the area.

It occupies a large part of the 18-hectare (180,000 m^{2}) Payanig sa Pasig property that is claimed by numerous parties as a result of its 1986 sequestration by the Presidential Commission on Good Government (PCGG) as part of the Ill-gotten wealth of the Marcos family.

== Payanig sa Pasig land dispute ==
Metrowalk occupies a large part of the 18-hectare (180,000 m^{2}) Payanig sa Pasig property that is claimed by numerous parties as a result of its 1986 sequestration by the Presidential Commission on Good Government (PCGG) as part of the Ill-gotten wealth of the Marcos family. Ortigas & Company, Ltd. Partnership (OCLP) has disputed the PCGG's sequestration, claiming that then-president Ferdinand Marcos had forced them to sell the property against their will in 1968. On June 19, 2007, Ilocos Norte governor Bongbong Marcos filed a motion to intervene in the OCLP v. PCGG case (Civil Case Number 0093) at the Sandiganbayan, the Philippines’ anti-graft court. Meanwhile, human rights victims from the period of Martial Law under Ferdinand Marcos have filed a suit noting that properties of the Marcoses should be made part of court-ordered reparations for the Marcos dictatorship's human rights victims. The PCGG considers the Payanig sa Pasig property the "crown jewel" among the properties sequestered from the Marcoses' ill-gotten wealth, estimating its minimum value to be about ₱16.5 billion in March 2015.

== Other notable news coverage ==
=== 2006 Leonardo Umale murder ===
The area made national news when its ownership was noted as a possible motive for the murder of a businessman, Leonardo Umale in 2006.

=== 2007 illegal casino allegations ===
In January 2007, the leisure hub was subject to media scrutiny when an alleged illegal casino was said to be operating within the area limits. This was then denied by former Pasig mayor Vicente Eusebio. However, The Manila Times noted that the mayor's comment was an official statement.

== Redevelopment ==
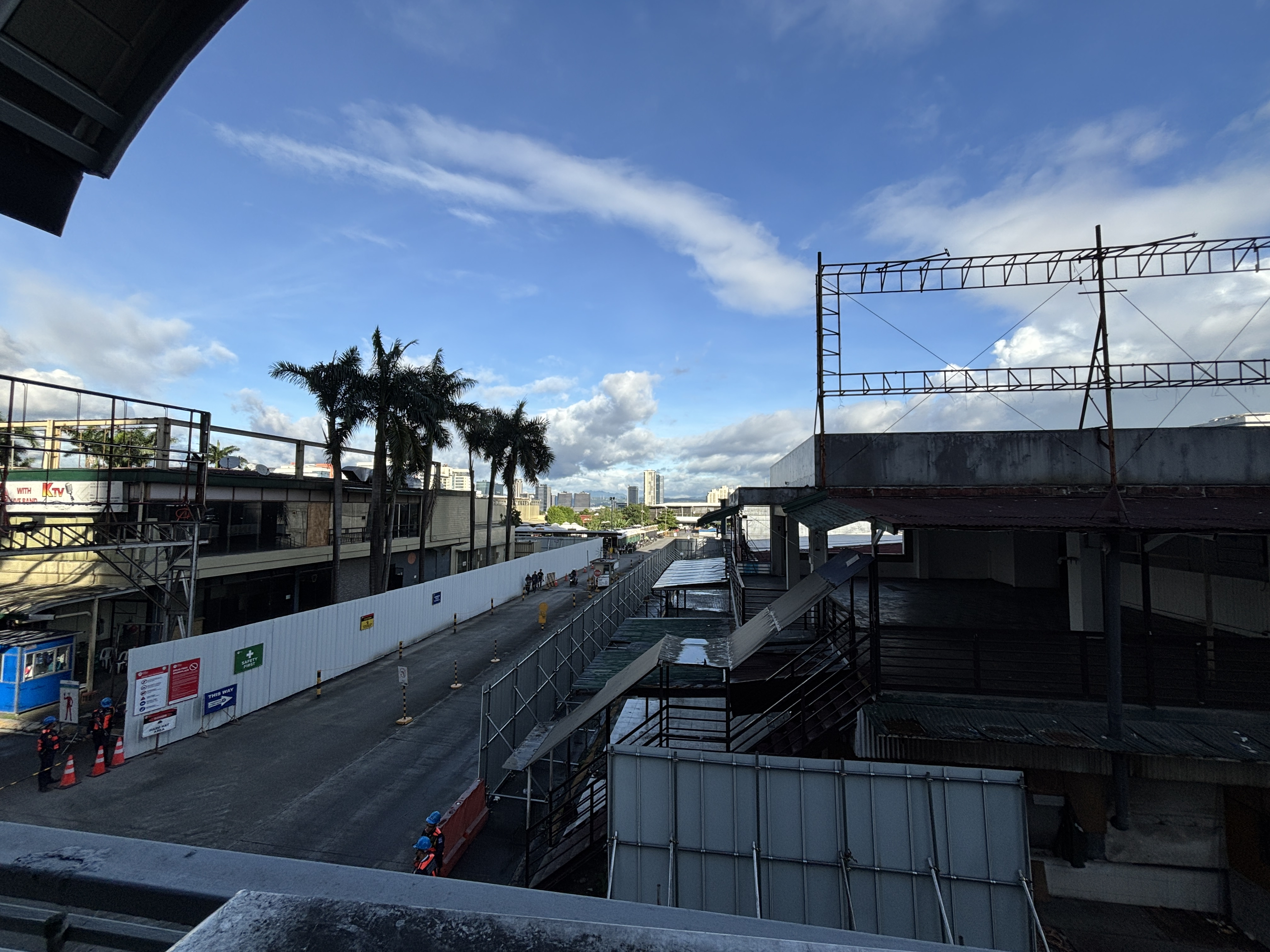
Metrowalk as a construction site for Metro Manila Subway's Ortigas station in 2025

In 2022, President Bongbong Marcos led the groundbreaking of the Ortigas and Shaw Boulevard stations of the Metro Manila Subway, of which the former is located within the Metrowalk property. Demolition of around 12,752 square meters (3.151 acres) of the Metrowalk property began in September 2025 to give way for the construction.

By 2024, Chavit Singson, the owner of the company that owns Metrowalk, is eyeing a total redevelopment of the area with the help of Korean investors. Singson also agreed with the Philippine Basketball Association for it to build its proposed own arena at Metrowalk.

A fire broke out within Metrowalk on January 16, 2026 with approximately ₱1 million in damage.
