= Bangsamoro Stand Alone Senior High School =

Location
- Cotabato City, Bangsamoro; Philippines
- 6.9807°N 118.5022°E

Information
- Other name: Bangsamoro Public Madrasah
- School type: Public, Basic
- Religious affiliation: Nonsectarian / with Madrasa (Islam)
- Established: July 26, 2024
- Local authority: Ministry of Basic, Higher and Technical Education of Bangsamoro
- Staff: Monawara Salik (Madrasa head)
- Capacity: 5,000 (total); 2,000 (madrasa)

Bangsamoro Stand Alone Senior High School is a publicly funded school in Cotabato City, Bangsamoro, Philippines. It also host the country's first public madrasa.

== History ==
The Bangsamoro Stand Alone Senior High School on August 18 would be completed on August 18, 2023, in Barangay Datu Balabaran of Cotabato City. The school would have a six four-storey buildings with 5,000 student capacity.

The Bangsamoro Election Code passed in 2021 would allow the Bangsamoro autonomous regional government to maintain a public madrasa. Traditionally Islamic education in the region is limited to the house of a teacher or in the mosque.

The Bangsamoro Public Madrasah was formally launched on July 26, 2024. The first day of classes would open on July 29, 2024, making the institution the first state-funded madrasa in the Philippines. It has an initial capacity to accommodate 2,000 students and offers programs from the kindergarten to senior high school level.
