= Meralco Avenue =

Road in Pasig, Metro Manila, Philippines

Coordinates: 14°34′54″N 121°3′49″E

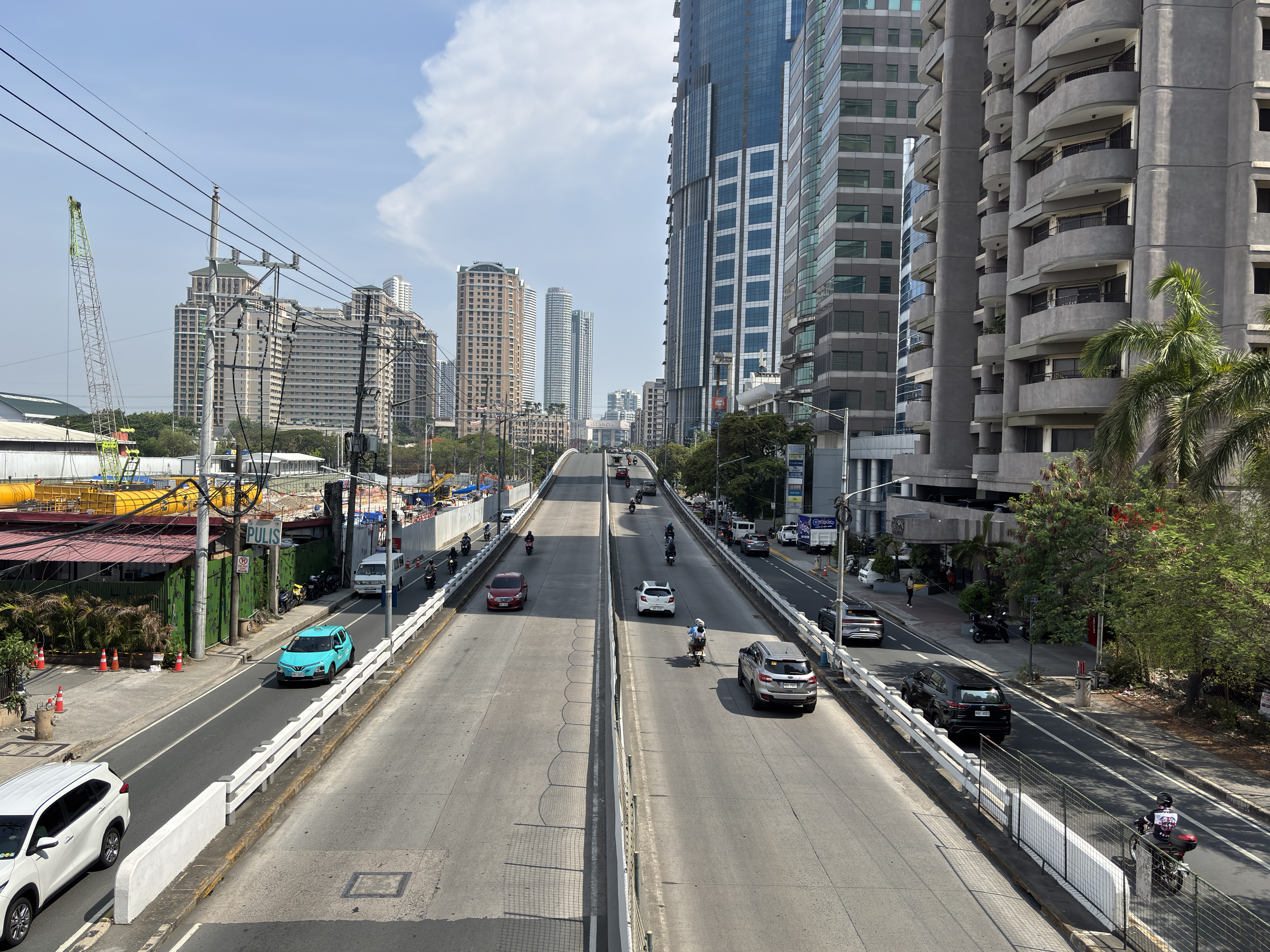
- Meralco Avenue southbound with the namesake flyover
- Interactive map of Meralco Avenue
- Namesake: Meralco
- Length: 1.6 km (0.99 mi)
- Location: Pasig
- North end: N60 (Ortigas Avenue)
- Major junctions: Julia Vargas Avenue; St. Paul Road; Capt. Henry Javier Street
- South end: N141 (Shaw Boulevard)

Meralco Avenue is a north-south thoroughfare in Ortigas Center in Pasig, Metro Manila, Philippines. It links Ortigas Avenue in the north and Shaw Boulevard in the south and borders the western edge of Valle Verde in Ugong. It is named after the Manila Electric Company (Meralco), headquartered at the avenue's intersection with Ortigas Avenue. Other notable businesses on Meralco Avenue include UnionBank Plaza, Marco Polo Ortigas Manila, Ayala Malls The 30th, Metrowalk, and the mixed-use development called Capitol Commons at the former Rizal Provincial Capitol lot on Meralco and Shaw Boulevard.

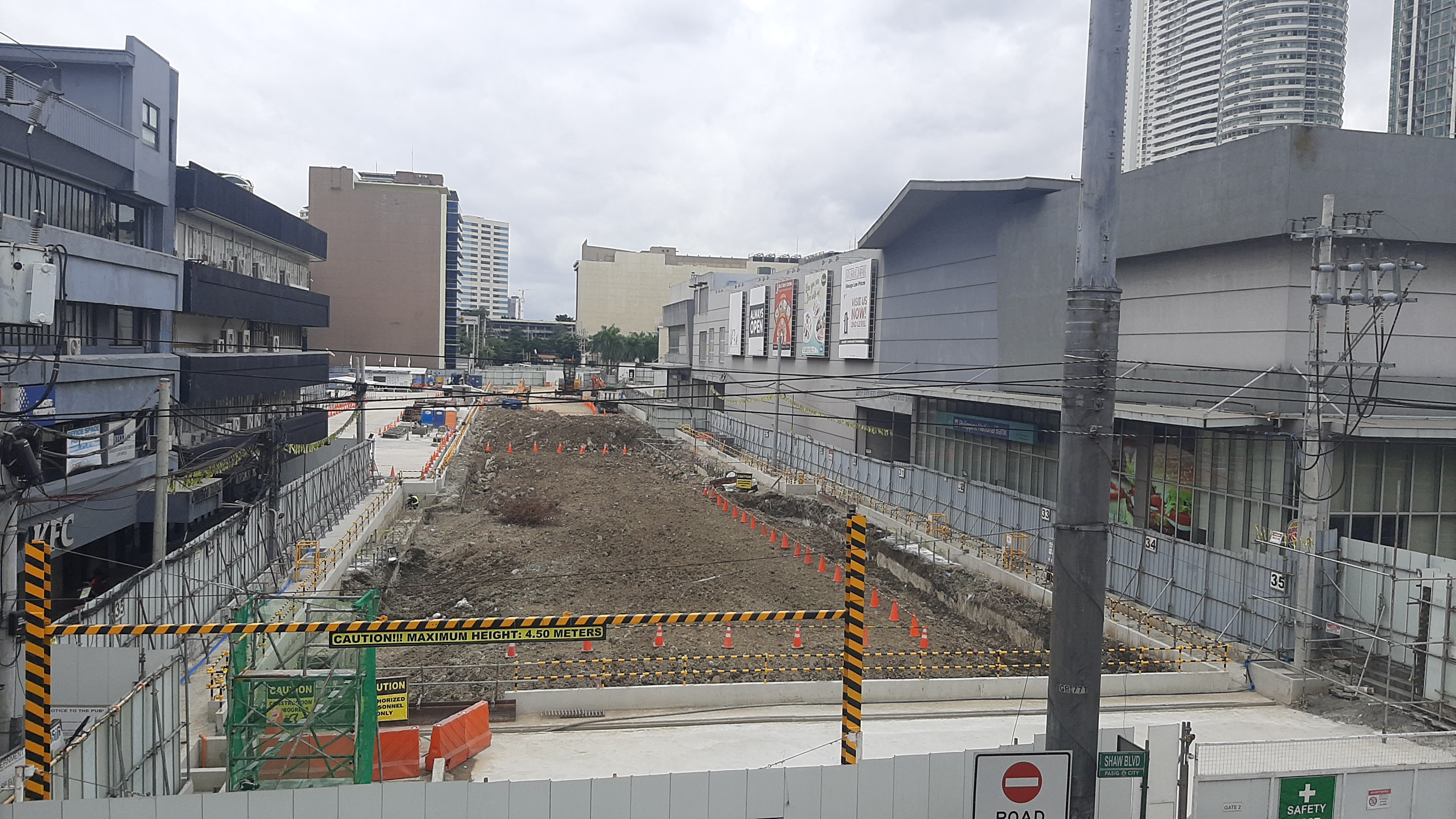
Construction of the Shaw Boulevard station of the Metro Manila Subway in 2025, located along the portion of Meralco Avenue that is closed since 2022.

Due to the construction of the Metro Manila Subway, the portion of the avenue from Shaw Boulevard to Anda Road, adjacent to Capitol Commons, has been closed since October 3, 2022, and is planned to remain closed until 2028.

== Route description ==
Spanning 1.6 kilometers (0.99 mi), the avenue begins at Shaw Boulevard in barangays Oranbo and Kapitolyo in Pasig. It runs between the Capitol Commons development on the east side and a residential village and townhouses of San Antonio to the west. It curves slightly north and intersects with Capt. Henry Javier Street towards the Department of Education complex and PhilSports Complex. A few hundred meters north, the avenue crosses Julia Vargas Avenue via a flyover, then passes through the busy Ortigas Center business district on the west side and Ayala Malls The 30th, Metrowalk, and several other retail establishments on the east. The avenue ends at Ortigas Avenue with the Meralco Building as a terminating vista.

Before August 2012, the approximately 0.5-kilometer (0.31 mi) segment from Capt. Henry Javier Street to Shaw Boulevard was previously a 9.7-meter-wide (32 ft) two-lane road. In anticipation of increased traffic due to the development of Capitol Commons, the segment of the road was widened to a 22.2-meter (73 ft) carriageway with three northbound lanes and two southbound lanes, with a lane width of 3.22 meters (10.6 ft) each as a result of a joint effort between Ortigas and Company and the Pasig government.

== Intersections ==
The entire route is located in Pasig.

km	mi	Destinations	Notes
		N60 (Ortigas Avenue)	Northern terminus. Traffic light intersection.
		North Drive	Northbound access only. Part of Metrowalk Commercial Complex.
		South Drive	Northbound access only. Part of Metrowalk Commercial Complex.
		Onyx Road	Southbound access only.
		North end of Julia Vargas-Meralco Avenue Flyover	
		Julia Vargas Avenue	Traffic light intersection.
		Exchange Road	Southbound access only.
		South end of Julia Vargas-Meralco Avenue Flyover	
		Saint Paul Street	Traffic light intersection.
		General Lim Street / Captain Henry P. Javier Street	Traffic light intersection.
		Saint Paul Street	Traffic light intersection.
		Anda Road	Part of Capitol Commons.
		Road closed to traffic from this point onwards due to the construction of the Metro Manila Subway.	
		General Segundo Road	Access to San Antonio Village.
		Capitol Commons Service Road	Part of Capitol Commons.
		Commons Drive	Part of Capitol Commons. Currently limited to freight delivery access for Unimart.
		General Araneta Road	Southbound access only. Closed access to San Antonio Village.
		N141 (Shaw Boulevard)	Southern terminus. Traffic light intersection.
1.000 mi = 1.609 km; 1.000 km = 0.621 mi: Closed/former; Incomplete access

== Landmarks ==
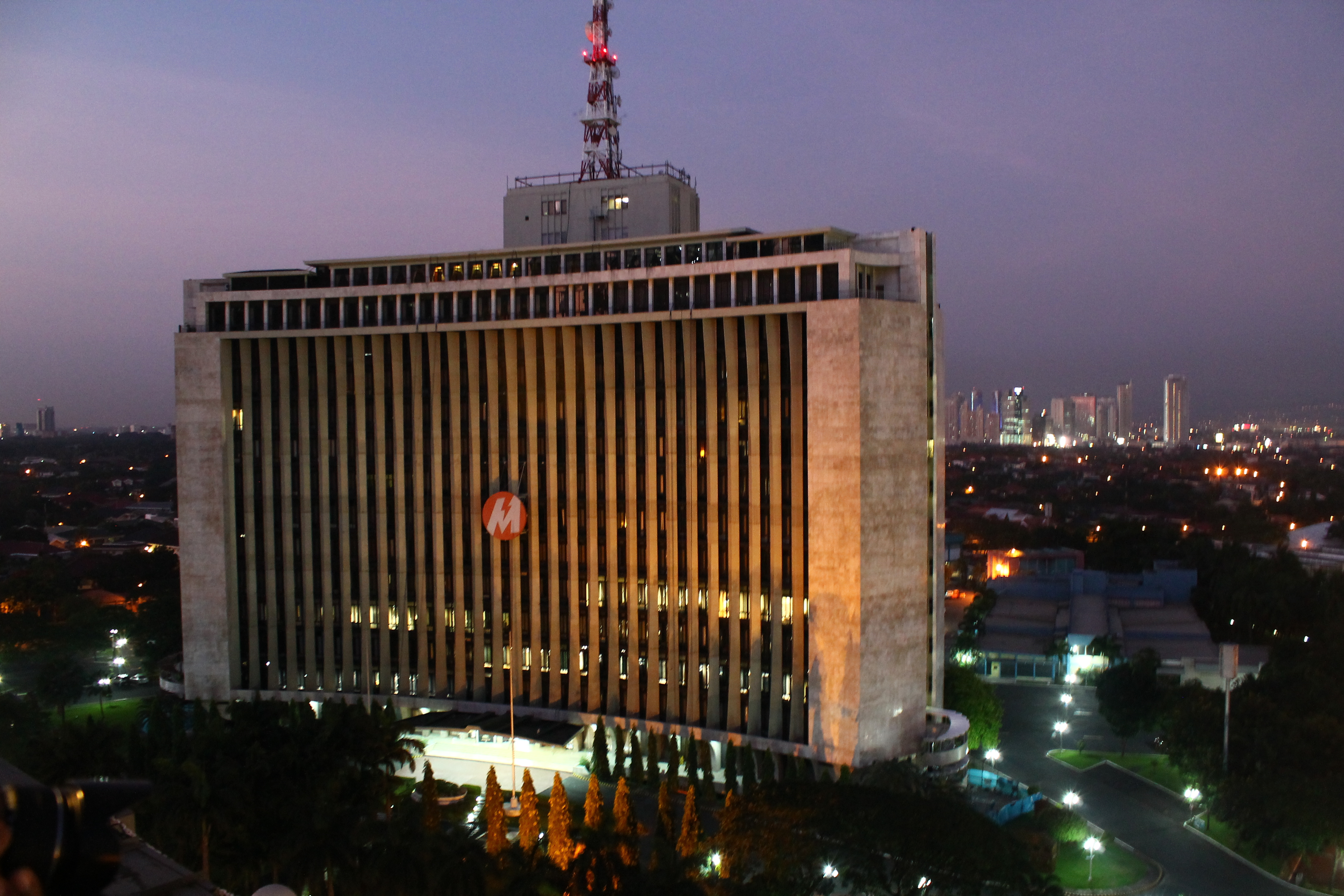
Meralco Building

- Ayala Malls The 30th
- Capitol Commons
- Department of Education complex
- Estancia Mall
- Marco Polo Ortigas Manila
- Megatent Events Venue
- Meralco Center
- Meralco Theater
- Metrowalk
- One Corporate Centre
- PhilSports Complex
- St. Paul College Pasig
- The Exchange Regency Residence Hotel
- UnionBank Plaza
