= Philippine Railways Institute =

Transportation research center

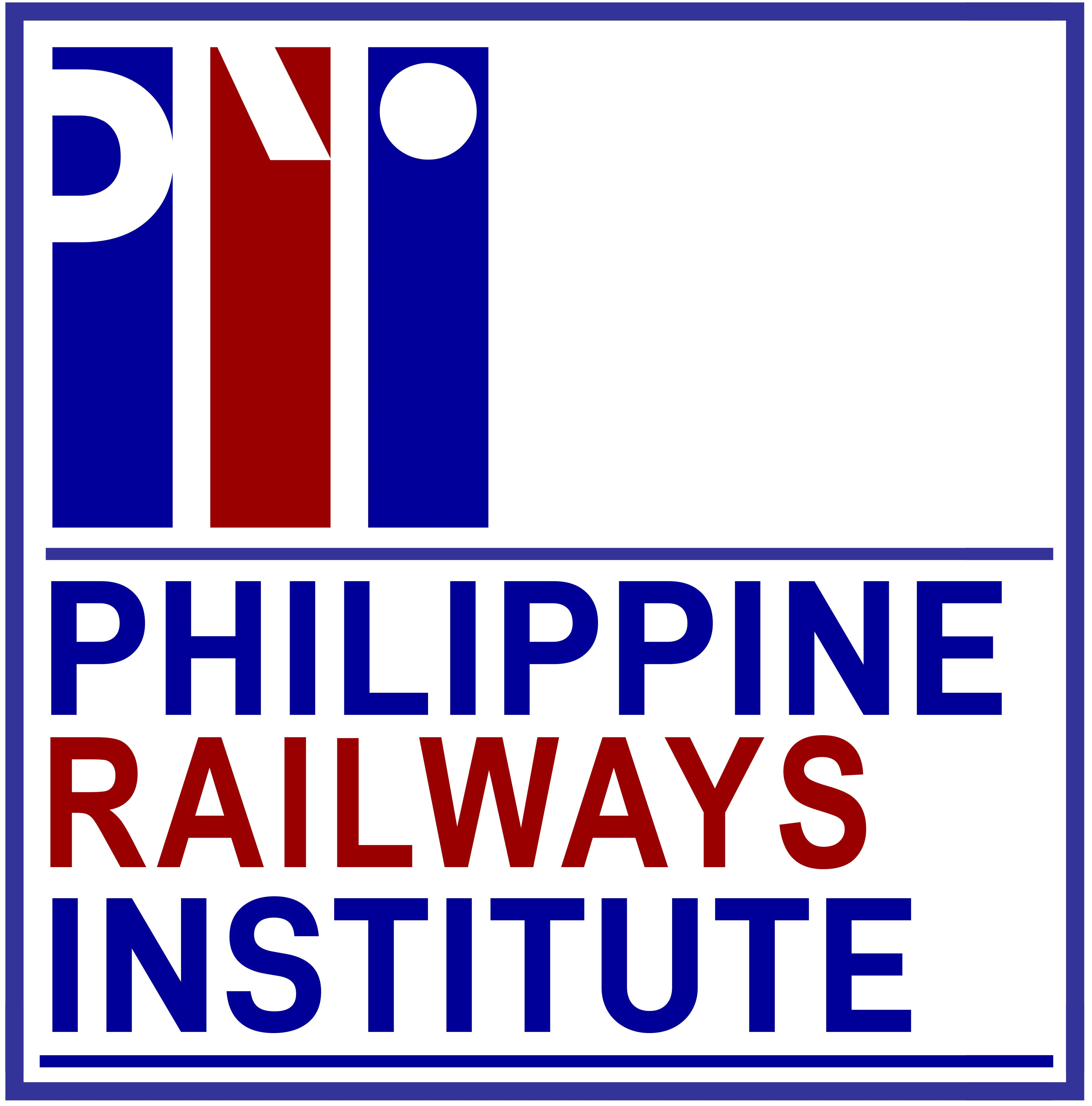
- Established: December 14, 2019; 6 years ago
- Field of research: Rail transportation-related human resources management
- Executive director: Usec. Anneli R. Lontoc, CESO I
- Location: 15th Floor, Unit 156,157, The Columbia Tower, Ortigas Avenue, Mandaluyong, Metro Manila, 1555, Philippines; 14.594635222399004°N 121.05627421534041°E
- Operating agency: Department of Transportation
- Website: https://pri.dotr.gov.ph/

Map
- Location within Metro Manila

The Philippine Railways Institute (PRI) is a rail transportation research and training center in the Philippines. It deals with research and development on the management, operation, and maintenance of railways, and training of personnel in the rail transportation industry.

== History ==
The Philippine Railways Institute was set up as a joint initiative of the Philippine and Japanese governments. The institute's establishment was funded through a grant of ¥690 million from the Japanese government. The curriculum of the PRI was approved in February 2019 during a meeting between the Department of Transportation (DOTr) and the Japan International Cooperation Agency after the groundbreaking of the Metro Manila Subway system. The PRI's first set of personnel was trained in Japan, also through a grant of the Japanese government through batches within the period of July to December 2019.

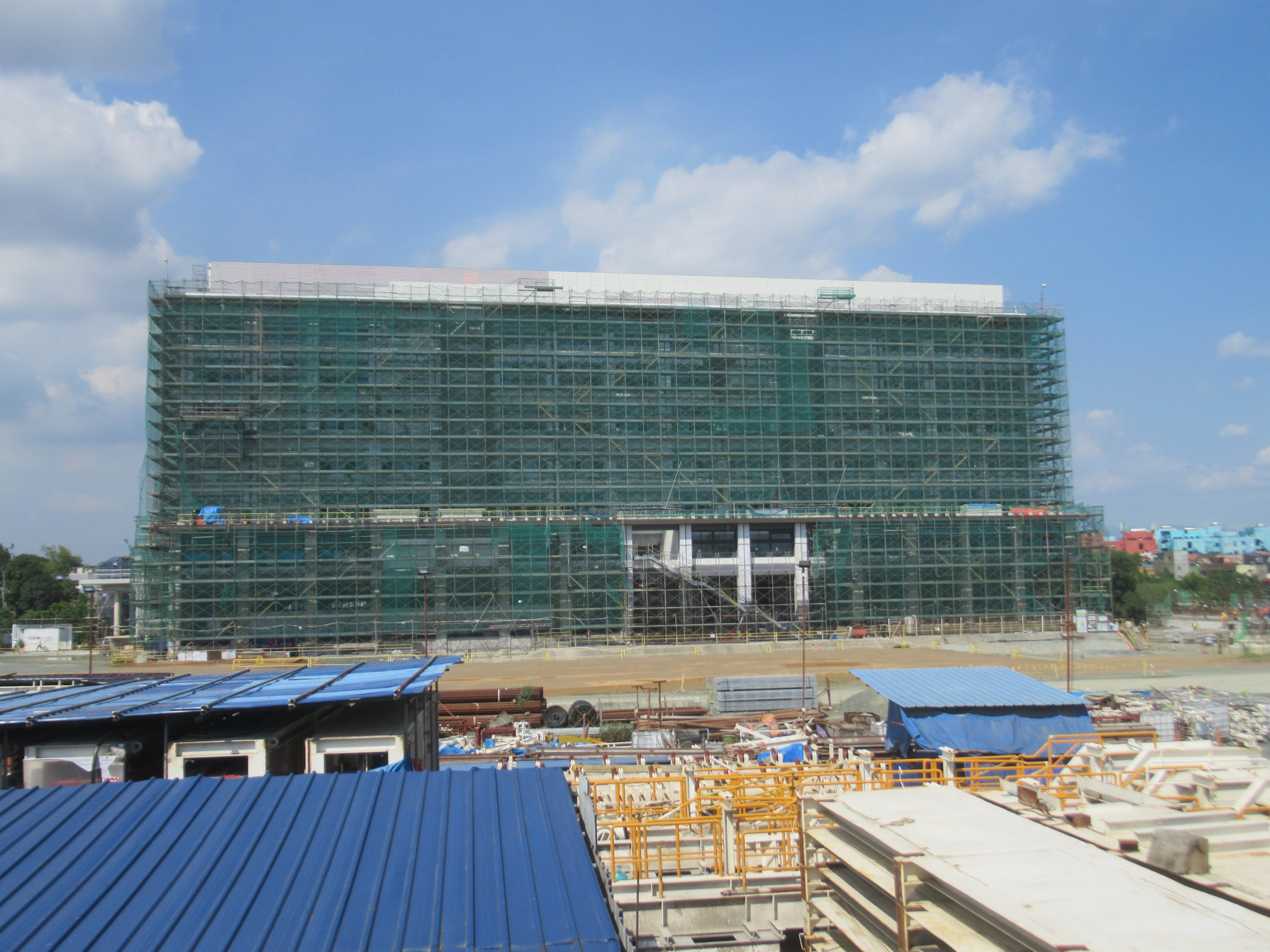
Under-construction Philippine Railways Institute building in Valenzuela, Metro Manila

The PRI was formalized through Executive Order No. 96 signed by President Rodrigo Duterte on November 21, 2019, and took effect on December 14 of the same year. The PRI was established as a research and training center and was placed under the supervision of the DOTr.

== Administration ==
The PRI is to be headed by an executive director which holds a rank of undersecretary and should have a relevant master's degree and experience in transportation capacity development.

== Role ==
The Philippine Railways Institute is a human resources research center on the rail transportation industry in the Philippines. It has two phases: as a learning institution and as a certification body. It is also planned that the institute will be an issuer of licenses for railway drivers and engineers in the Philippines.
