= Ministry of Basic, Higher and Technical Education =

Education ministry of Bangsamoro, Philippines

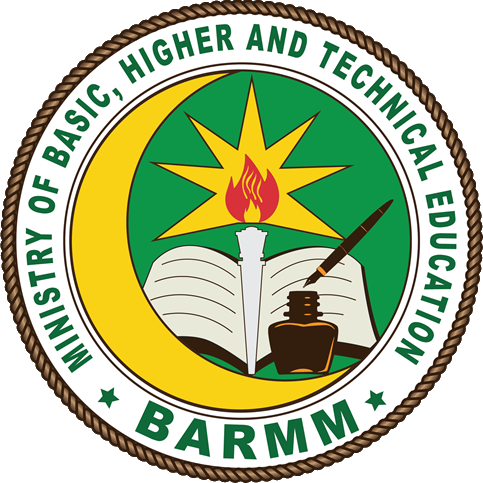
- Seal

- Logo

Agency overview
- Preceding agency: DepEd–ARMM
- Jurisdiction: Regional government of Bangsamoro
- Headquarters: BARMM Complex, Cotabato City
- Minister responsible: Naguib Sinarimbo, Minister of Education
- Website: min-edu.bangsamoro.gov.ph

The Ministry of Basic, Higher and Technical Education (MBHTE) is the regional executive department of the Bangsamoro Autonomous Region in Muslim Mindanao (BARMM) responsible for affairs relating to education in the region. It is tasked to establish, maintain, and support a complete and integrated system of quality education in the Bangsamoro.

== History ==
The Ministry of Basic, Higher and Technical Education (MBHTE) of Bangsamoro was formed by absorbing the function of various regional offices of the Philippine national government for the Autonomous Region in Muslim Mindanao (ARMM). This offices include that of the Department of Education (DepEd), the Commission on Higher Education (CHED), and the Technical Education and Skills Development Authority (TESDA). The ARMM is the predecessor government of the Bangsamoro Autonomous Region in Muslim Mindanao (BARMM).

When the ARMM was succeeded by the Bangsamoro Autonomous Region in Muslim Mindanao (BARMM) in 2019, the regional departments of the former ARMM were reconfigured into ministries of Bangsamoro. Mohagher Iqbal was appointed on February 26, 2019, by interim Chief Minister Murad Ebrahim as the newly reconfigured Bangsamoro department's first minister.

In August 2025, the Commission on Audit ordered a special audit of MBHTE's ₱2.2 billion worth of alleged anomalous disbursements, including ₱1.77 billion paid in a single day and ₱449 million to one supplier.

The MBHTE inaugurated its three-storey office within the Bangsamoro Government Center in Cotabato City on January 15, 2026.

In May 11, 2026, Chief Minister Abdulraof Macacua ordered Iqbal to tender his resignation until May 18 on which he would have deemed "resigned". Iqbal confirmed his removal on May 22 but disputed the manner of his removal alleging he was not given a chance to properly turned over the ministry. Macacua took over the education ministry.

== Relations with national government ==
The Bangsamoro education ministry entered into an agreement with the Commission on Higher Education (CHED) of the Philippine national government in April 2019. Under the agreement CHED will provide technical assistance to BARMM to improve the state and accessibility of higher education in the region.

== Ministers ==
#	Minister	Term began	Term ended	Chief Minister
1	Mohagher Iqbal	February 26, 2019	May 18, 2026	Murad Ebrahim
1	Mohagher Iqbal	February 26, 2019	May 18, 2026	Abdulraof Macacua
–	Abdulraof Macacua	May 18, 2026	November 5, 2026	Himself
2	Naguib Sinarimbo	November 5, 2026	incumbent	Abdulraof Macacua
