= Upper Bicutan National High School =

Public high school in Taguig, Philippines

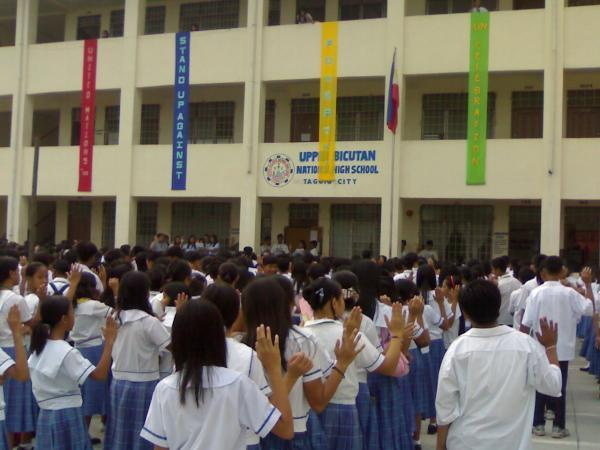

Location
- General Santos Avenue, Barangay Central Bicutan, Taguig City; Philippines; 14°29′26″N 121°03′15″E

Information
- Other name: U.B.N.H.S
- Established: 2005
- Budget: ▲ ₱103.52 million (2025)
- Website: sites.google.com/deped.gov.ph/ubnhs-official/home

Upper Bicutan National High School, commonly abbreviated as U.B.N.H.S is a secondary high school institution located at General Santos Avenue, Barangay Central Bicutan, Taguig City in the Philippines.

== School profile ==
Upper Bicutan National High School is situated at Barangay Central Bicutan, Taguig City.The area was formerly part of Barangay Upper Bicutan until the creation of Barangay Central Bicutan in 2008.

It has 2500 square meters. It is bounded by the Department of Science and Technology Complex to the southwest, Camp Bagong Diwa, Upper Bicutan Elementary School and Division of Taguig City and Pateros to the southeast, and the Justice Hall-DPWH Compound to the northeast.

== History ==
Upper Bicutan National High School was introduced by Congressman Allan Peter Cayetano through House bill no. 5554 entitled “An act establishing a National High School in Barangay Upper Bicutan, Taguig Metro Manila, to be known as Upper Bicutan National High School, appropriating fund therefore”. The bill was approved by the house on December 14, 2005 and was transmitted and received by the senate on December 22, 2005. The 2,500 sq. meter portion of lot behind Upper Bicutan Elementary School was granted by the Department of Science and Technology under Secretary Estrella F. Alabastro under the memorandum of agreement between the Department of Science and Technology and Department of Education - Division of Taguig City and Pateros signed through a usufruct status.

The institution opens its door in the school year 2005–2006 with 11 teachers under the leadership of Nelson S. Quintong. The first seven months was the most difficult time in the history of the academe with no equipment and materials for teaching; students patiently sat on rice sacks just to learn and teachers alternately rest and work in one table with two chairs and one electric fan. The designated principal in his effort to provide quality education to its clientele waste no time to answer the needs of the school. Chairs, tables, books and other materials were borrowed from nearby public schools. He strengthens the link between faculty and parents through collaborative effort to support the necessities of the school.

In January 2006, the school was turned over to the leadership of Mr. Nestor R. Ramos who lifted the school into a new stage of development. Equipment and materials were gradually raised through partnership with the non-governmental organization like the Philippine Business for Social Progress (PBSP), Mead Johnson, GIL@S to name a few. The school during that time, had no Maintenance, Operation and other Expenses (MOOE) but through the effort of Mr. Ramos and with the help of the General Parents-Teachers Association the school was able to purchase its own equipment and was able to construct ancillary offices to reinforce the learning of the students. The first graduating class was in March, 2006 held in as simple ceremony at the school ground.

Mr. Santiago T. Alvis assumed office as principal of the school in July, 2008. In his determination to provide the school with adequate rooms, another extension of the school building was constructed to further expand the school for its growing population. In order to cater the huge enrollment population of the school and its growing number of teachers, the principal organized the function of the school by filling in administrative plantilla of personnel. In his administration seven (7) head teachers, one (1) master teacher and two (2) finance personnel were appointed by the division office.

In July, 2010, there had been a major reshuffling of principals in the Division of Taguig City and Pateros, which appointed Mrs. Guia R. Dela Cruz to the position. The present administration initiated significant changes in physical development, staff improvement, and pursuit of quality education. The principal lit the torch of leadership to enhance learning. All offices were converted to more suitable stations for work and the construction of two fully functional computer rooms. Several activities were line up to achieve the objectives of the school, in addition to this, the school extend it arms to the community where faculty and students actively participated in outreach and giving gifts to the community. The students and the school continue to reap honors and achievement both in academic and extracurricular contest in the division up to the national level. One proof of this is the recognition given to the school by the National Capital Region as one of the highest increment of scores in the National Achievement Test.

== Principals ==
Period	Name
May 2005-December 2005	Nelson S. Quintong
January 2006-July 2008	Nestor R. Ramos
July 2008 – July 2011	Santiago T. Alvis
July 2011 – May, 2014	Guia R. Dela Cruz
May, 2014 – present	Gina R. Poblete
