= Department of Education (Philippines) =

Executive department of the Philippine government

- Kagawaran ng Edukasyon
- Seal

- Logotype

- Department of Education building

Department overview
- Formed: June 23, 1898; 128 years ago
- Preceding agencies: Department of Public Instruction; Department of Public Instruction and Information; Department of Instruction; Department/Ministry of Education and Culture; Ministry/Department of Education, Culture and Sports
- Jurisdiction: Philippines
- Headquarters: DepEd Complex, Meralco Avenue, Pasig, Metro Manila, Philippines; 14°34′44.47″N 121°3′53.57″E
- Employees: ▼977,603 (2023)
- Annual budget: ▲PH₱734.19 billion (2025)
- Department executive: Sonny Angara, Secretary
- Website: deped.gov.ph

The Department of Education (DepEd; Filipino: Kagawaran ng Edukasyon) is the executive department of the Philippine government responsible for ensuring access to, promoting equity in, and improving the quality of basic education.

It is the main agency tasked to manage and govern the Philippine system of basic education. It is the chief formulator of Philippine education policy and responsible for the Philippine primary and secondary school systems. It has its headquarters at the DepEd Complex on Meralco Avenue in Pasig.

The department is currently led by the secretary of education, nominated by the president of the Philippines and confirmed by the Commission on Appointments. The secretary is a member of the Cabinet. The position of Secretary of Education is Sonny Angara since July 19, 2024. Presently, its mission is to provide quality basic education that is equitably accessible to all and lay the foundation for lifelong learning and service for the common good. It has changed its vision statement, removing a phrase that some groups deem to be "too sectarian" for a government institution.

== History ==
Philippine Education has undergone different stages of progress from the pre-Spanish era to the present.

=== Spanish period ===
During the early Spanish period, education in the Philippines was religion-oriented and was primarily for the elite, especially in the first years of Spanish colonization. Access to education by Filipinos was later liberalized through the enactment of the Educational Decree of 1863, which provided for the establishment of at least one primary school for boys and girls in each town under the responsibility of the municipal government, and the establishment of a normal school for male teachers under the supervision of the Jesuits. Primary instruction was secularized and free, and the teaching of Spanish was compulsory. It was also through this decree that the 'Superior Commission of Primary Instruction' was established, the seminal agency of the Department of Education.

The defeat of Spain by United States forces in 1898 paved the way for Aguinaldo's Republic under a Revolutionary Government. The schools maintained by Spain for more than three centuries were closed temporarily but were reopened on August 29, 1898 by the secretary of the interior. A system of free and compulsory elementary education was established by the Malolos Constitution, under Article 23. However, this first sovereign education system was interrupted in 1899 with the start of the Philippine–American War, and was finally dismantled.

=== American period ===
A secularized and free public school system during the first decade of American rule was established upon the recommendation of the Schurman Commission in 1900. Free primary instruction that trained the people for the duties of citizenship was enforced by the Taft Commission as per instructions of US President William McKinley. Chaplains and non-commissioned officers were assigned to teach using English as the medium of instruction.

A highly centralized public school system was instituted in January 1901 by the Taft Commission, by virtue of Act No. 74. This act also established the Department of Public Instruction, headed by a General Superintendent. The implementation of this Act created a heavy shortage of teachers so the Philippine Commission authorized the Superintendent of Public Instruction to bring 500 teachers from the United States to the Philippines. They would later be popularly known as the Thomasites.

In 1908, the Philippine Legislature approved Act No. 1870, creating the University of the Philippines.

The Organic Act of 1916 reorganized the Department of Public Instruction, mandating that it be headed by a secretary. This act also mandated the Filpinization of department secretaries, except that of the secretary of public instruction.

=== World War II ===
During World War II, the department was reorganized once again through the Japanese's Military Order No. 2 in February 1942, splitting the department into the Ministry of Education and the Ministry of Health, Labor and Public Instruction. Under the Japanese, the teaching of Tagalog, Philippine history, and character education was given priority. Love for work and the dignity of labor were also emphasized.

In October 1944, months after President Manuel L. Quezon's death, the department was renamed as the Department of Public Instruction and Information, with Carlos P. Romulo at the helm. Upon the return and resumption of the Commonwealth Government in February 1945, its name was changed to the Department of Instruction.

In 1947, by virtue of Executive Order No. 94 by President Manuel Roxas, the department was reorganized to the Department of Education. During this period, the regulation and supervision of public and private schools belonged to the Bureau of Public and Private Schools.

=== Martial law ===
Ministry of Education and Culture (1978)

Upon the start of Martial Law in September 1972, it became the Department of Education and Culture and subsequently reorganized into the Ministry of Education and Culture in June 1978 by virtue of Presidential Decree No. 1397, due to the shift to a parliamentary system of government. Thirteen regional offices were created and major organizational changes were implemented in the educational system.

The Education Act of 1982 created the Ministry of Education, Culture and Sports, which became the Department of Education, Culture and Sports (DECS) in 1987 via Executive Order No. 117 by President Corazon C. Aquino.

The structure of DECS as embodied in EO 117 has practically remained unchanged until 1994, when the Commission on Higher Education (CHED) was established, and on August 25, 1994, when the Technical Education and Skills Development Authority (TESDA) was established to supervise tertiary degree programs and non-degree technical-vocational programs, respectively. The trifocal education system refocused the department's mandate to basic education, which covers elementary, secondary and non-formal education, including culture and sports. CHED is responsible for tertiary education, while TESDA now administers the post-secondary, middle-level manpower training and development.

In August 2001, the Governance of Basic Education Act was passed, renaming the DECS to the Department of Education (DepEd) and redefining the role of field offices, which include regional offices, division offices, district offices, and schools.

The Act removed the administration of cultural and sports activities from the department. The National Historical Institute, Records Management and Archives Office, and the National Library are now administratively attached to the National Commission for Culture and the Arts (NCCA). All previous functions, programs, and activities related to sports competition were transferred to the Philippine Sports Commission (PSC). In addition, the Bureau of Physical Education and School Sports was abolished.

=== Contemporary period ===
In the new school calendar, DepEd Order No. 3, series of 2024 dated February 19, 2024 “adjusted end of the school year (SY) shall be May 31, 2024.” It urged schools to conduct all end-of-school-year rites from May 29 to 31, as the school break is set from June 1 to July 26 and the start of the SY 2024-2025 is set for July 29 which will then end on May 16, 2025.

== Organizational structure ==
At present, the Department is headed by the secretary of education, with the following undersecretaries and assistant secretaries:

- Undersecretary for Office of the Secretary/Chief of Staff
- Undersecretary for Strategic Management
- Undersecretary for Administration
- Undersecretary for Operations
- Undersecretary for Finance
- Undersecretary for Procurement
- Undersecretary for Legal and Legislative Affairs
- Undersecretary for Human Resource and Organizational Development
- Undersecretary for Learning Systems
- Undersecretary for Support to the Implementation of Public-Private Partnerships
- Assistant Secretary for Strategic Management
- Assistant Secretary for Operations
- Assistant Secretary for Office of the Secretary
- Assistant Secretary for Procurement
- Assistant Secretary for Information and Communications Technology Service
- Assistant Secretary for Learning Systems

Under the Office of the Secretary are the following offices and services:

- External Partnership Service
- Public Affairs Service
- Internal Audit Service

A director is assigned to each of the 18 regions of the Philippines; the Ministry of Basic, Higher and Technical Education (Bangsamoro) (BARRM) is governed by a regional minister. A schools division superintendent, assistant schools division superintendent, chief education supervisor, education program supervisor/specialist, district supervisor, section chief, school principal, and assistant school principal is assigned to each of the school divisions defined by the department. Also teacher, master teacher, head teacher, and non-teaching personnel is assigned to public schools defined by the schools division offices.

=== Bureaus and services ===
DepEd is composed of 18 bureaus and services:

- Administrative Service (AS)
- Bureau of Curriculum Development (BCD)
- Bureau of Education Assessment (BEA)
- Bureau of Human Resources and Organizational Development (BHROD)
- Bureau of Learning Delivery (BLD)
- Bureau of Learning Resources (BLR)
- Bureau of Learner Support Service (BLSS)
- Bureau of Secondary Education (BSE)
- Disaster Risk Reduction and Management Service (DRRMS)
- External Partnerships Service (EPS)
- Finance Service (FS)
- Information and Communications Technology Service (ICTS)
- Legal Service (LS)
- National Educators' Academy of the Philippines (NEAP)
- Planning Service (PS)
- Procurement Service (PROCS)
- Project Management Service (PMS)
- Public Affairs Service (PAS)

== Regional and division offices ==
National Capital Region (NCR)
| Schools Division Office | No. of Public Schools | No. of Private Schools |
|---|---|---|
| Caloocan | 89 | |
| Las Piñas | 39 | |
| Makati | 23 | |
| Malabon | 42 | |
| Mandaluyong | 24 | |
| Manila | 105 | |
| Marikina | 33 | |
| Muntinlupa | 28 | |
| Navotas | 25 | |
| Parañaque | 43 | |
| Pasay | 29 | |
| Pasig | 44 | |
| Quezon City | 159 | |
| San Juan | 13 | |
| Taguig and Pateros | 62 | |
| Valenzuela | 70 | |

Cordillera Administrative Region (CAR)
| Schools Division Office | No. of Public Schools | No. of Private Schools |
|---|---|---|
| Abra | 317 | |
| Apayao | 200 | |
| Benguet | 427 | |
| Ifugao | 266 | |
| Kalinga | 194 | |
| Mountain Province | 266 | |
| Baguio | 68 | |
| Tabuk | 103 | |

Region I – Ilocos Region
| Schools Division Office | No. of Public Schools | No. of Private Schools |
|---|---|---|
| Ilocos Norte | 364 | |
| Ilocos Sur | 506 | |
| La Union | 386 | |
| Pangasinan I | 662 | |
| Pangasinan II | 562 | |
| Alaminos | 46 | |
| Batac | 33 | |
| Candon | 34 | |
| Dagupan | 39 | |
| Laoag | 40 | |
| San Carlos | 76 | |
| San Fernando | 30 | |
| Urdaneta | 64 | |
| Vigan | 21 | |

Region II – Cagayan Valley
| Schools Division Office | No. of Public Schools | No. of Private Schools |
|---|---|---|
| Batanes | 27 | |
| Cagayan | 809 | |
| Cauayan | 80 | |
| Ilagan | 98 | |
| Isabela | 883 | |
| Nueva Vizcaya | 383 | |
| Quirino | 186 | |
| Santiago | 41 | |
| Tuguegarao | 36 | |

Region III – Central Luzon
| Schools Division Office | No. of Public Schools | No. of Private Schools |
|---|---|---|
| Aurora | 176 | |
| Bataan | 215 | |
| Bulacan | 510 | |
| Nueva Ecija | 755 | |
| Pampanga | 565 | |
| Tarlac | | |
| Zambales | 315 | |

Region IV-A (Calabarzon)
| Schools Division Office | No. of Public Schools | No. of Private Schools |
|---|---|---|
| Antipolo | 67 | |
| Bacoor | 43 | |
| Batangas | 739 | |
| Batangas City | 110 | |
| Biñan | 40 | |
| Cabuyao | 29 | |
| Calamba | 72 | |
| Cavite | 334 | |
| Cavite City | 14 | |
| Dasmariñas | 45 | |
| General Trias | 41 | |
| Imus | 38 | |
| Laguna | 345 | |
| Lipa | 85 | |
| Lucena | 54 | |
| Quezon | 958 | |
| Rizal | 304 | |
| San Pablo | 81 | |
| Santa Rosa | 28 | |
| Tanauan | 59 | |
| Tayabas | 35 | |

Mimaropa
| Schools Division Office | No. of Public Schools | No. of Private Schools |
|---|---|---|
| Calapan | 59 | |
| Marinduque | 229 | |
| Occidental Mindoro | 363 | |
| Oriental Mindoro | 540 | |
| Palawan | 828 | |
| Puerto Princesa | 101 | |
| Romblon | 271 | |

Region V – Bicol Region
| Schools Division Office | No. of Public Schools | No. of Private Schools |
|---|---|---|
| Albay | 556 | |
| Camarines Norte | 319 | |
| Camarines Sur | 1,098 | |
| Catanduanes | 268 | |
| Masbate | 703 | |
| Sorsogon | 531 | |
| Iriga | 51 | |
| Legazpi | 58 | |
| Ligao | 67 | |
| Masbate City | 703 | |
| Naga | 43 | |
| Sorsogon City | 83 | |
| Tabaco | 50 | |

Region VI – Western Visayas
| Schools Division Office | No. of Public Schools | No. of Private Schools |
|---|---|---|
| Aklan | 378 | |
| Antique | 538 | |
| Capiz | 471 | |
| Guimaras | 115 | |
| Iloilo City | 66 | |
| Iloilo | 1,172 | |
| Passi | 45 | |
| Roxas City | 50 | |

Negros Island Region (NIR)
| Schools Division Office | No. of Public Schools | No. of Private Schools |
|---|---|---|
| Negros Occidental | 576 | |
| Bacolod | 70 | |
| Bago | 47 | |
| Cadiz | 69 | |
| Escalante | 42 | |
| Himamaylan | 56 | |
| Kabankalan | 93 | |
| La Carlota | 30 | |
| Sagay | 66 | |
| San Carlos | 65 | |
| Silay | 39 | |
| Sipalay | 47 | |
| Talisay | | |
| Victorias | 26 | |

Region VII – Central Visayas
| Schools Division Office | No. of Public Schools | No. of Private Schools |
|---|---|---|
| Bogo | 38 | |
| Bohol | 1,116 | |
| Carcar | 49 | |
| Cebu City | 107 | |
| Cebu | 1,142 | |
| Naga | 55 | |
| Danao | 61 | |
| Lapu-Lapu City | 70 | |
| Mandaue | 48 | |
| Tagbiliran | 26 | |
| Talisay | 43 | |
| Toledo | 63 | |

Region VIII – Eastern Visayas
| Schools Division Office | No. of Public Schools | No. of Private Schools |
|---|---|---|
| Baybay | 82 | |
| Biliran | 143 | |
| Borongan | 58 | |
| Calbayog | 174 | |
| Catbalogan | 58 | |
| Eastern Samar | 466 | |
| Leyte | 1,282 | |
| Maasin City | 78 | |
| Northern Samar | 608 | |
| Ormoc City | 98 | |
| Samar (Western) | 741 | |
| Southern Leyte | 343 | |
| Tacloban City | 60 | |

Region IX – Zamboanga Peninsula
| Schools Division Office | No. of Public Schools | No. of Private Schools |
|---|---|---|
| Dapitan | 61 | |
| Dipolog | 49 | |
| Isabela | 64 | |
| Pagadian | 82 | |
| Zamboanga City | 218 | |
| Zamboanga del Norte | 760 | |
| Zamboanga del Sur | 810 | |
| Zamboanga Sibugay | 508 | |
| Sulu | | |

Region X – Northern Mindanao
| Schools Division Office | No. of Public Schools | No. of Private Schools |
|---|---|---|
| Bukidnon | 652 | |
| Cagayan de Oro | 115 | |
| Camiguin | 66 | |
| Gingoog | 97 | |
| El Salvador | 24 | |
| Illigan | 112 | |
| Lanao del Norte | 383 | |
| Malaybalay | 87 | |
| Misamis Oriental | 422 | |
| Misamis Occidental | 337 | |
| Oroquieta | 51 | |
| Ozamiz | 58 | |
| Tangub | 65 | |
| Valencia | 65 | |

Region XI – Davao Region
| Schools Division Office | No. of Public Schools | No. of Private Schools |
|---|---|---|
| Davao City | 437 | |
| Davao de Oro | 417 | |
| Davao del Norte | 264 | |
| Davao del Sur | 262 | |
| Davao Occidental | 217 | |
| Davao Oriental | 333 | |
| Digos City | 48 | |
| Samal | 75 | |
| Mati | 72 | |
| Panabo | 62 | |
| Tagum | 39 | |

Region XII – Soccsksargen
| Schools Division Office | No. of Public Schools | No. of Private Schools |
|---|---|---|
| Cotabato | | |
| General Santos | 105 | |
| Kidapawan | 76 | |
| Koronadal | 55 | |
| Sarangani | 327 | |
| South Cotabato | 383 | |
| Sultan Kudarat | 406 | |
| Tacurong | 31 | |

Region XIII (Caraga)
| Schools Division Office | No. of Public Schools | No. of Private Schools |
|---|---|---|
| Agusan del Norte | 209 | |
| Agusan del Sur | 518 | |
| Bayugan | 71 | |
| Bislig | 70 | |
| Butuan | 139 | |
| Cabadbaran | 35 | |
| Dinagat Island | 144 | |
| Siargao Island | 146 | |
| Surigao City | 87 | |
| Surigao del Norte | 201 | |
| Surigao del Sur | 453 | |
| Tandag | 31 | |

MBHTE-BARMM
| Schools Division Office | No. of Public Schools | No. of Private Schools |
|---|---|---|
| Basilan | 179 | |
| Cotabato City | 45 | |
| Lamitan | 56 | |
| Lanao del Sur I | 414 | |
| Lanao del Sur II | 392 | |
| Maguindanao del Norte | | |
| Maguindanao del Sur | | |
| Tawi-Tawi | 263 | |

== Attached agencies ==
The following agencies, councils, and schools are attached to DepEd for policy and program coordination:

- Instructional Materials Council (IMC)
- National Academy of Sports (NAS)
- National Book Development Board (NBDB)
- National Council for Children's Television (NCCT)
- National Museum of the Philippines
- National Science Teaching Instrumentation Center (NSTIC)
- Philippine High School for the Arts (PHSA)

The Commission on Higher Education (CHED), the National Commission for Culture and the Arts (NCCA), and the Philippine Sports Commission (PSC) are attached to the Office of the President, while the Technical Education and Skills Development Authority (TESDA) is attached to the Department of Labor and Employment (DOLE).

== Controversies ==
=== Christmas ham and cheese bid ===
The Department of Education drew flak online in November 2020 for an invitation for bidding on its website for the supply and delivery of ham and cheese for the DepEd Central Office worth ₱4.28 million. The invitation read that the cost is equivalent to 4,260 hams and 2,160 cheese supplies for the annual Christmas celebration of the central office.

Netizens criticized the bidding as ill-timed as it was posted during the onset of Typhoon Rolly and Typhoon Ulysses, which at the time, caused extensive damage and casualties to the affected areas. In response, the department has since canceled and retracted the bidding and pledged to reallocate the funds to typhoon relief efforts and for their COVID-19 response.

=== Self-learning modules controversy ===
Due to the COVID-19 pandemic in the Philippines in early 2020, the Department of Education shifted schools into distant learning with the use of online and printed self-learning modules later that year. However, several of these modules were found to have incorrect and questionable content.

In August 2020, a DepEd TV episode used for a test broadcast contained grammatical errors in the sample questionnaire for a Grade 8 English course. Later in October, a math problem on DepEd TV had also gone viral for having an incorrect solution, wherein the solution asked students to divide by zero.

==== Controversial references to the sitting Vice President ====
In April 2022, a month before the 2022 Philippine presidential election, images of a Grade 11 self-learning module initially distributed in 2020 entitled "Introduction to Philosophy of the Human Person" contained exercises that portrayed and addressed Vice President Leni Robredo in a negative light started circulating online. The learning activity in question instructed "students to identify which among the given headlines has no errors in spelling, grammar and content", and another question asked students which statements contained "substantial generalization".

7. Which among these headlines has no errors in terms of spelling, grammar, and content?

- A. Robredo Chides Government for Unclear Communication on New Quarantine Rules.
- B. Robredo Blames the Government as They Don’t Have Clear Rules in Quarantine.
- C. Robredo Charge the Government as Culprit for Confusion in Quarantine.
- D. Robredo blames those in Executive Branch for Communication’s Unclear.

8. Which among the following statements contain substantiated generalizations?

- A. “Drug war a massive failure” – Robredo.
- B. Robredo lies to the world, shames the nation and herself in UN message
- C. The real albatross on Leni Robredo’s neck.
- D. Let Leni plan on her own drug war

After substantial media coverage of the issue, Division of City Schools – Manila released a statement apologizing for the publication and distribution of the module and ordered the module to be removed online and for copies of it to be recalled from students. The office also stated that the module in question did not undergo a proper review and that "more strict mechanisms" would be put in place as well. The Secretary of Education had also released a statement assuring the public that efforts will be made "to warn our officials and personnel, including teachers, against participating in partisan politics." The team responsible for the module will also be subjected to review by the Department of Education to prevent future errors from occurring the future.

=== High price funding of laptops ===
In early August 2022 in the midst of the COVID-19 pandemic, it was reported by the Commission on Audit (COA) That the Department of Education purchased approximately ₱2.4 billion worth of laptops for 39,583 public school teachers.

Due to the influence of the Procurement Service of the Department of Budget and Management (PS-DBM), who made suggestions to increase the anticipated cost from ₱35,046 to ₱58,300 each unit, the initial intended number of laptops to be purchased which is 68,500 units was decreased to only 39,583 units. Because of the high price and the unit purchase decrease, over 28,000 teachers were left without laptops. The laptops have been reported to be powered by “outdated” Intel Celeron processors. The said laptops ended up being more expensive than the M1 MacBook Air which was priced at ₱57,990 at that time.
