= Quirino Highway station =

Station on the Metro Manila Subway

Quirino Highway MMS
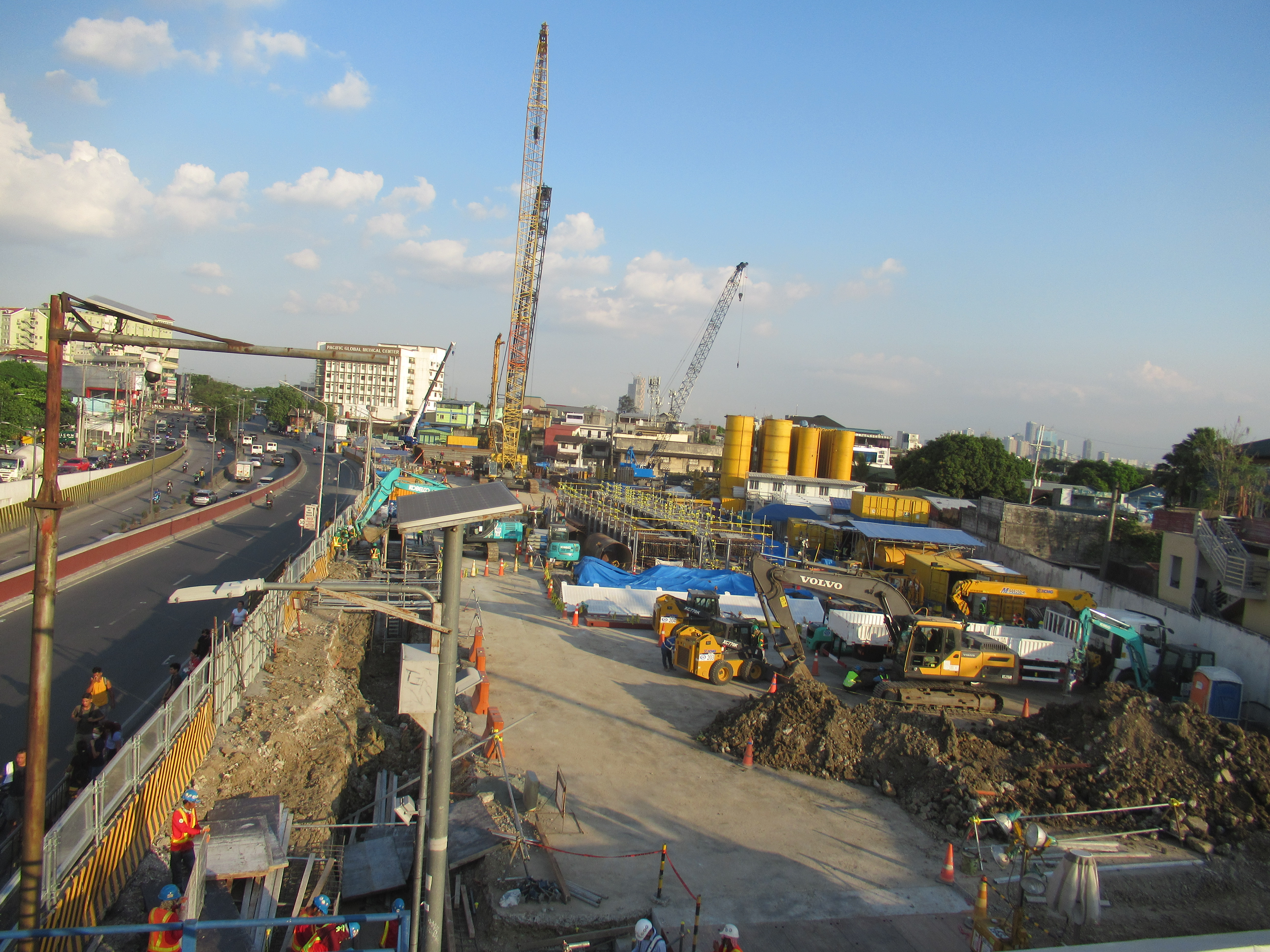
- Quirino Highway station construction in April 2023

General information
- Location: Quirino Highway, Novaliches; Quezon City, Metro Manila; Philippines
- Coordinates: 14°41′22″N 121°01′42″E
- Owner: Department of Transportation
- Operator: Department of Transportation
- Line: Metro Manila Subway
- Tracks: 2
- Connections: Buses and Jeepneys

Construction
- Structure type: Underground
- Accessible: Yes

Other information
- Status: Under construction
- Station code: BL02

History
- Opening: c. 2032

Services
Preceding station	Manila MRT	Following station
East Valenzuela Terminus	Metro Manila Subway	Tandang Sora towards FTI or NAIA Terminal 3
Location

Quirino Highway station is an under-construction Metro Manila Subway station located in Quirino Highway, Barangay Talipapa, Novaliches, Quezon City, Philippines. It is the second station for trains headed northbound towards East Valenzuela and the fourteenth station for trains headed southbound to NAIA Terminal 3.

Serving the Novaliches area, some of the station's closest landmarks include the NLEX Harbor Link, Pacific Global Medical Center, and a Wilcon Depot.

== History ==
In February 2019, the Department of Transportation signed a deal with the joint venture of Shimizu Corporation, Fujita Corporation, Takenaka Civil Engineering Co., Ltd., and EEI Corporation for the design and build contract for the first three stations of the Metro Manila Subway, which includes the Quirino Highway station. The station was initially planned as the northern terminus of the line until East Valenzuela station was added to the proposal in June 2020. The Department of Transportation (DOTr) then began clearing a site for the partial operability section of the Metro Manila Subway to initiate its construction. Construction of the station was delayed by the COVID-19 pandemic, but was continued in late 2021.

== Transportation links ==
Jeepneys, taxis, and buses will be available around the station. It will also have access to buses going northbound and southbound along Mindanao Avenue because of a dedicated bus station outside the station. There are also tricycles near the area, especially within Quirino Highway and Marigold Street.
