= Metro Manila Subway =

Future subway line in the Philippines

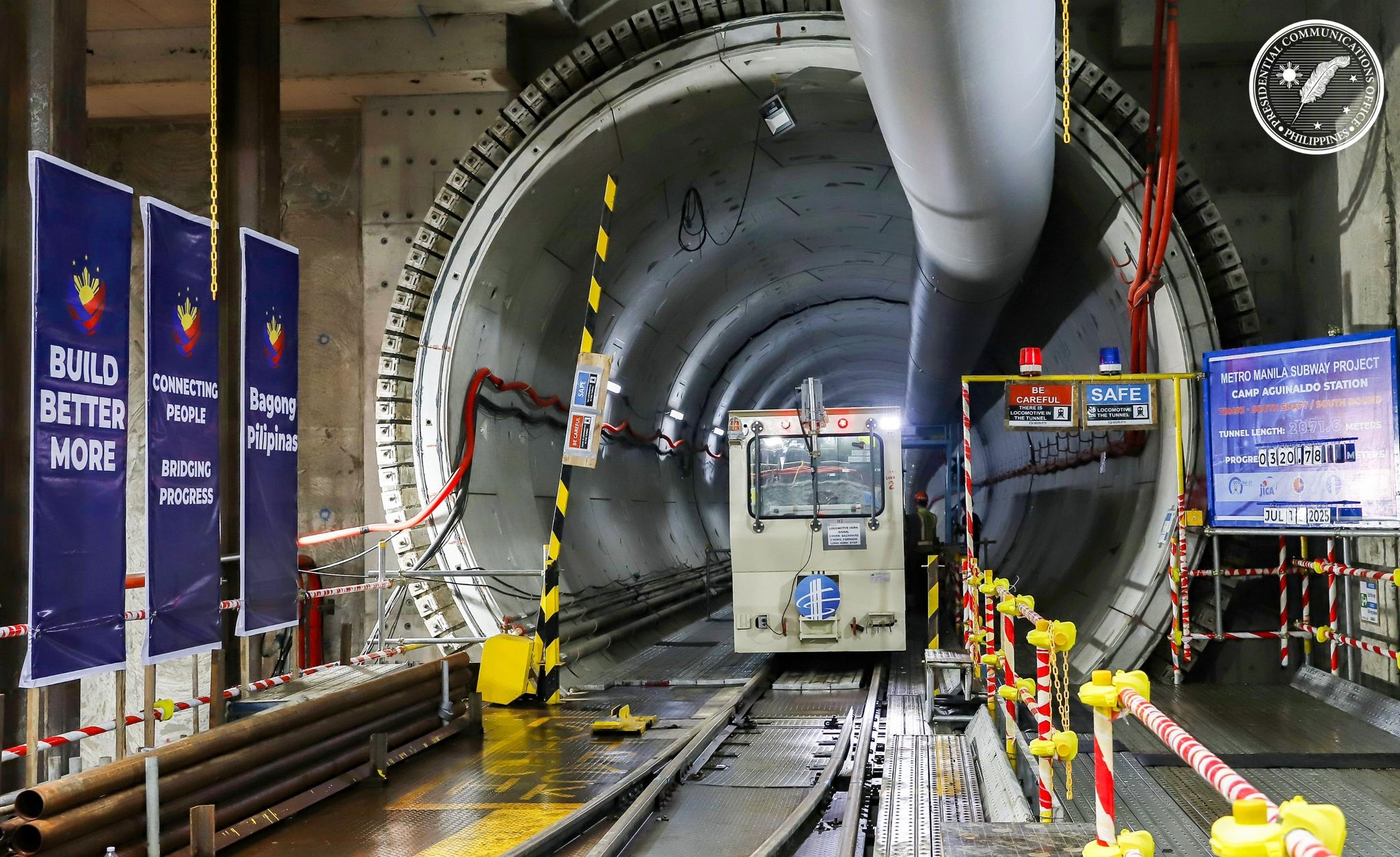
- The subway's Camp Aguinaldo station in Quezon City, under construction in July 2025

Overview
- Other name: Mega Manila Subway
- Status: Under construction (Phase 1); Proposed (Phase 2)
- Owner: Department of Transportation
- Line number: 9
- Locale: Metro Manila (Phase 1); Bulacan and Cavite (Phase 2)
- Termini: East Valenzuela; NAIA Terminal 3 Bicutan
- Stations: 17

Service
- Type: Rapid transit
- System: Manila Metro Rail Transit System
- Operator: Department of Transportation
- Depot(s): Ugong, Valenzuela
- Rolling stock: Sustina electric multiple units
- Daily ridership: 370,000 (projected)

History
- Work began: February 27, 2019; 7 years ago
- Planned opening: 2032; 6 years' time (Phase 1); TBA (Phase 2)

Technical
- Line length: 33 km (21 mi) (Note: Line length from Valenzuela to Bicutan. The proposed line in 2014 is planned to be 57.7 km (35.9 mi) long from San Jose del Monte to Dasmariñas.)
- Number of tracks: Double-track
- Character: Underground
- Track gauge: 1,435 mm (4 ft 8 1/2 in) standard gauge
- Loading gauge: 4,150 mm × 3,000 mm (13 ft 7 in × 9 ft 10 in)
- Minimum radius: Mainline: 160 m (520 ft); Depot: 100 m (330 ft)
- Electrification: 1,500 V DC overhead lines
- Operating speed: 80 km/h (50 mph)
- Signalling: Nippon Signal SPARCS moving block CBTC

The Metro Rail Transit Line 9, or MRT-9, also known the Metro Manila Subway Project (MMSP), or commonly known as the Metro Manila Subway is an under-construction underground rapid transit line in Metro Manila, Philippines. The 33-kilometer (21 mi) line, which will run north–south between Valenzuela, Quezon City, Pasig, Taguig, Parañaque and Pasay, consists of 17 stations between the East Valenzuela and Bicutan stations. It will become the country's second direct airport rail link after the North–South Commuter Railway, with a branch line to Ninoy Aquino International Airport.

Dubbed as the country's "Project of the Century", the Metro Manila Subway broke ground on February 27, 2019, and construction began the following December. Subsequently, suffering delays due to the COVID-19 pandemic, the line was scheduled to fully open in 2029. The project is expected to cost ₱355.6 billion (equivalent to USD7.06 billion in 2017). Much of its cost is covered by a loan provided by the Japan International Cooperation Agency (JICA). However, it is unlikely to be completed during Bongbong Marcos's administration due to right of way problems; operations are expected to begin in 2032.

The Metro Manila Subway is planned to be integrated with the public transit system in Metro Manila. Passengers may take various forms of road-based public transport, such as buses and jeepneys, to and from a station to reach their intended destination. The line is designed to connect with other urban rail transit services in the region; riders may transfer to LRT Line 1, MRT Line 3, and MRT Line 7 at the nearby North Triangle Common Station, which is also currently under construction. Other connections include the existing LRT Line 2 and NSCR, as well as the MRT Line 4 and MRT Line 8.

The line is projected to serve 370,000 passengers per day in the short term, with longer term growth leading to a projected 1.5 million passengers of daily ridership.

== History ==
=== Background ===
Comparison between MMSP and former proposals
1973 UTSMMA				1976 JICA				2014/2015 JICA				MMSP			
Line no.	From	To	Length	Line no.	From	To	Length	Route name	From	To	Length	Scheme	From	To	Length
1	Quezon Memorial, Quezon City	Manila International Airport (now Ninoy Aquino International Airport), Parañaque	21.7 km	1	University of the Philippines, Quezon City	Manila International Airport (now Ninoy Aquino International Airport), Parañaque	25.2 km	Mass Transit System Loop	Bonifacio Global City, Taguig	Taft Avenue, Pasay	20 km (11 km)	2017 proposal	Quirino Highway, Quezon City	FTI, Taguig	25 km
2	Manotoc Subdivision, Novaliches Quezon City	Pasig	25.6 km	2	Novaliches, Quezon City	Guadalupe, Makati	N/A	Mega Manila Subway	Caloocan	Dasmarinas, Cavite	59 km	2019 proposal	Ugong, Valenzuela	FTI, Taguig/NAIA Terminal 3	33 km
3	Sangandaan, Caloocan	Roxas Boulevard, Pasay	23.0 km	3	Malabon	Roxas Boulevard, Pasay	N/A	none							
4	Baclaran, Parañaque	Cubao, Quezon City	19.0 km	4	Baclaran, Parañaque	Cubao, Quezon City	N/A	none							
5	Tutuban, Manila	Marulas, Valenzuela	8.0 km	5	Tutuban, Manila	Marulas, Valenzuela	N/A	none							

==== Early proposals and studies ====
The idea of building a subway in the Greater Manila Area had been forwarded as early as 1973, when the JICA (at the time known as the Overseas Technical Cooperation Agency or OTCA) and former Secretary of Public Works and Highways David Consunji conducted a study on what shall later be Metro Manila (formally constituted on November 7, 1975). The 1973 plan was known as the Urban Transport Study in Manila Metropolitan Area (UTSMMA).

The 1973 plan provided for the construction of five heavy rail subway lines in Metro Manila. The first line (Line 1) would have a length of 27.1 kilometers (16.8 mi), running from Constitution Hills (now Batasan Hills), Quezon City to Talon, Las Piñas. The second line (Line 2), meanwhile, would be 36 kilometers (22 mi) long from Novaliches, Quezon City to Cainta, Rizal, while Line 3 for 24.3 kilometers (15.1 mi) throughout Epifanio de los Santos Avenue. The fourth line (Line 4) would have been 30.1 kilometers (18.7 mi) long from Marikina to Zapote, Bacoor, and the fifth line would have a length of 17.6 kilometers (10.9 mi) from Rizal Avenue, Manila to Meycauayan, Bulacan. The plan would have resolved the traffic problems of Metro Manila and would have taken 15 years to complete, or until 1988.

In 1975, a Reuters report said Manila was having traffic problems as many people feared that the population would grow, the number of commuters would increase, and there would be one day with only people on the streets with no vehicles. Also, it says that the team from JICA is studying the project that recommended the subway system and was expected to cost about US$930 million.

In 1976, JICA conducted a feasibility study of the line, known as Rapid Transit Railway (RTR) Line 1. The study proposed a tentative route from Manila International Airport (MIA), now Ninoy Aquino International Airport (NAIA), to the University of the Philippines in Quezon City, totaling 25.2 kilometers (15.7 mi). With the planned completion dates between 1983 and 2000 for that line with four stages, the other lines would have been constructed as part of the RTR network: Line 2 would connect Novaliches in Quezon City to Guadalupe, Makati; Line 3 would connect Malabon to Roxas Boulevard in Pasay; Line 4 would connect Baclaran in Parañaque to Cubao in Quezon City; and Line 5 would connect Binondo to Marulas in Valenzuela. Also, Pacific Consultants International and the Japan Overseas Consultants participated as a study team. According to some critics of the LRT Line 1 that was built instead of the RTR Line 1, Marcos decided against the subway after being convinced by his advisers that the line could not be completed before Singapore finished its own first line.

It was also proposed to be part of the 1977 Metro Manila Transport, Land Use and Development Planning Project (MMETROPLAN), which was funded by the World Bank. However, the plan was not included and implemented, for some of the areas included in the plan, such as Marikina and Cainta, are prone to flooding. Instead, what was built was the LRT Line 1, opened on December 1, 1984, and completed on May 12, 1985. According to Felino Palafox, the LRT was the most feasible transport system at that time. Nevertheless, the current Manila Light Rail Transit System (mostly elevated) is shorter than the line system forwarded in 1973.

==== Proposals in the 1990s and 2000s ====
In 1995, the Mexican firm Grupo ICA, which also constructed the Mexico City Metro, was in talks with the Department of Public Works and Highways (DPWH) to build a subway in the Philippines. In 1998, the Department of Transportation and Communications (DOTC, later DOTr) signed a memorandum of understanding (MOU) with JK International Ltd. to conduct a feasibility study of a subway project; a route would have been linked between Port of Manila and NAIA. In 2001, Italian firms Grandi Lavori Fincosit and Societa Esecuzione Lavori Idraulici signed an agreement with the DOTC, for a MOU. The 10-kilometer-long (6.2 mi) tunnel section of the subway would connect Bonifacio Global City (BGC), going through EDSA and connecting the Ortigas, Greenhills, and Shaw Boulevard commercial centers. However, when former President Joseph Estrada resigned from office in the same year, the project never materialized.

==== Planning in the 2010s ====
The project was proposed once more in the 2014 Metro Manila Dream Plan as a 57.7-kilometer (35.9 mi) line that would serve as the second north–south mass transit backbone for the newly expanded Greater Capital Region (the first being the North–South Commuter Railway). The Metro Manila Dream Plan (formally titled the Roadmap for Transport Infrastructure Development for Metro Manila and Its Surrounding Areas) is an integrated plan based on recommendations from a study conducted by the Japan International Cooperation Agency (JICA). It was approved by the National Economic and Development Authority (NEDA) Board in June 2014, to last until 2030. The program aims to improve the transport system in Metro Manila with the hope of turning it into a focal point for addressing Metro Manila's interlinked problems in the areas of transportation, land use, and environment.

In September of that year, British subway contractor Arup presented its profile to the DOTC in case the agency decides to build a subway system in Metro Manila, an official of the Makati Business Club said. Applied Planning & Infrastructure Inc., in association with MKL Associates, proposed a version of the subway plan and conducted a business case as a private initiative for the project known as the Manila Central Subway. They lay out the definite alignment of the first 150 km (93 mi), approximate the next 150 km, and guess the last 82 km (51 mi); the first 150 km are to be further subdivided into workable segments of 30 to 40 km (19 to 25 mi) each. Locate optimal sites for subway stations and determine their basic requirements at least for the first 150 km; hire top-level consultants to prepare detailed engineering designs for the initial 150 km of tubes and various stations, optimal performance standards, environmental impact, economic and social benefits, value for money, and geotechnical and other technical analyses. The proposed lines are: the red line would run from North Triangle Common Station to Mall of Asia, while the extensions would lead to Tutuban and Taft Avenue MRT station; the brown line would connect NLEX in Valenzuela to FTI (using the same alignment as MMS Phase 1), and the extension would lead to Alabang; the blue line express would run along between the two lines; and finally, the green line would connect from Manila Bay to Tikling Junction, while the extensions would lead to Taytay and Holy Spirit, Quezon City.

A year later, JICA published an information collection survey for the project, and the subway was to have 59 kilometers (37 mi) of route from Caloocan to Dasmarinas, Cavite, and the C4 route is the most suitable option. Meanwhile, the first phase is 22.6 kilometers (14.0 mi) from Mindanao Avenue and Quirino Highway in Quezon City to FTI in Taguig; Phase 2 leads to Bagong Silang, Caloocan, 10.2 kilometers (6.3 mi) up north; and Governor's Drive, Dasmarinas, is 26.1 kilometers (16.2 mi). Also, the intermodal terminal building was to be located at Market! Market! in BGC and to cater buses, jeepneys, and taxis at this terminal.

=== Development ===
In 2015, the National Economic and Development Authority approved the construction of the Makati-Pasay-Taguig Mass Transit System Loop Line 5 (MTSL Line 5), which would have been a 20-kilometer-long (12 mi) underground railway from BGC to Taft Avenue, as identified in the JICA study. Despite the fact that the route is 11 kilometers (6.8 mi) long, it passes through the central business districts. The project was to be funded through the public-private partnership scheme, but after former President Benigno Aquino III stepped down from office, the project stalled and was revived again by his successor, Rodrigo Duterte. In January 2017, JICA was keen on developing a MTSL project, and in the same year, the Metro Manila Subway (then known as the Mega Manila Subway) was launched and included in the administration's Build! Build! Build! program.

In August of that year, JICA published the preparatory survey for the project, which means the alignment would have run 25 kilometers (16 mi) from Quirino Highway to FTI along C-5. The alignment did not have a route to NAIA before it was revised.

The development of the project was approved by the Investment Coordination Committee (ICC) board of the National Economic and Development Authority on September 6, subject to secondary approval by the NEDA Board. The development was approved by the NEDA Board headed by President Duterte six days later. On March 16, 2018, the Philippine and Japanese governments signed a loan agreement for the subway. The first tranche of the official development assistance from JICA amounted to ¥104.5 billion (₱51.3 billion). The second tranche of the loan, signed on February 10, 2022, amounted to ¥253.3 billion (₱112.1 billion). On March 26, 2024, the third tranche of the loan was signed, amounting to ¥150 billion (₱55.37 billion).

In June 2018, soil testing was conducted along the alignment. In the same month, the Department of Environment and Natural Resources (DENR) decided that the subway would not pass along the fault line because the West Valley Fault passes along C-5 road in Taguig. The following November, OC Global, a Japanese consortium consisting of Oriental Consultants Global Co. Ltd., Tokyo Metro Co. Ltd., Katahira & Engineers International, Pacific Consultants Co Ltd., Tonichi Engineering Consultants, Inc., and Metro Development Co. Ltd., was appointed as the project consultant.

=== Construction ===
List of contractors
Contract package	Scope of work	Contractors	Date awarded	Notes
CP 101	Construction of first three stations	(Japan) Shimizu Corporation (Japan) Fujita Corporation (Japan) Takenaka Corporation (Philippines) EEI Corporation	February 2019	JIM Technology Corporation was appointed to use tunnel boring machines for the construction.
CP 102	Construction of the Quezon Avenue and East Avenue stations	(Japan) Nishimatsu Construction (Philippines) DMCI	September 2022	
CP 103	Construction of Anonas and Katipunan stations	(Japan) Sumitomo Mitsui Construction	September 2022	
CP 104	Construction of Ortigas and Shaw stations	(Philippines) Megawide (Japan) Tokyu Construction (Japan) Tobishima Construction	April 2022	
CP 105	Construction of Fort Bonifacio section and associated stations	(Japan) Nishimatsu Construction (Philippines) DMCI	October 2025	
CP 106	Electrical and mechanical (E&M) systems	(Japan) Mitsubishi Corporation (France) (United Kingdom) Colas Rail (Note: Responsible for the engineering and system integration, railway track and signaling, power distribution, depot equipment and overhead lines) (Japan) Hitachi (formerly Thales) (Note: Responsible for the communications and supervision systems as well as the automated fare collection (AFC) system) (France) Egis (Note: Responsible for the preliminary design of the E&M systems and the installation of >1,300 platform screen doors.) (awarded by Mitsubishi)	September 2021 (Mitsubishi); February 2022 (Colas Rail, Thales (later acquired by Hitachi for ground transportation business in 2024), and Egis)	Subcontractors: (Japan) Nippon Signal (for CBTC signaling)
CP 107	Rolling stock	(Japan) Sumitomo Corporation (Japan) J-TREC	December 2020	
CP 108	Construction of Lawton and Senate–DepEd stations	TBD		Ongoing bidding
CP 109	Construction of NAIA spur line	(Japan) Taisei Corporation (Philippines) DMCI	March 2026	
CP S-03b	Construction of Senate–FTI section	(Hong Kong) Leighton Contractors (Asia) (Philippines) First Balfour	February 2023	This contract package is funded by the Asian Development Bank (ADB), which included FTI and Bicutan stations of the subway as part of packages for the southern segment of the North–South Commuter Railway.

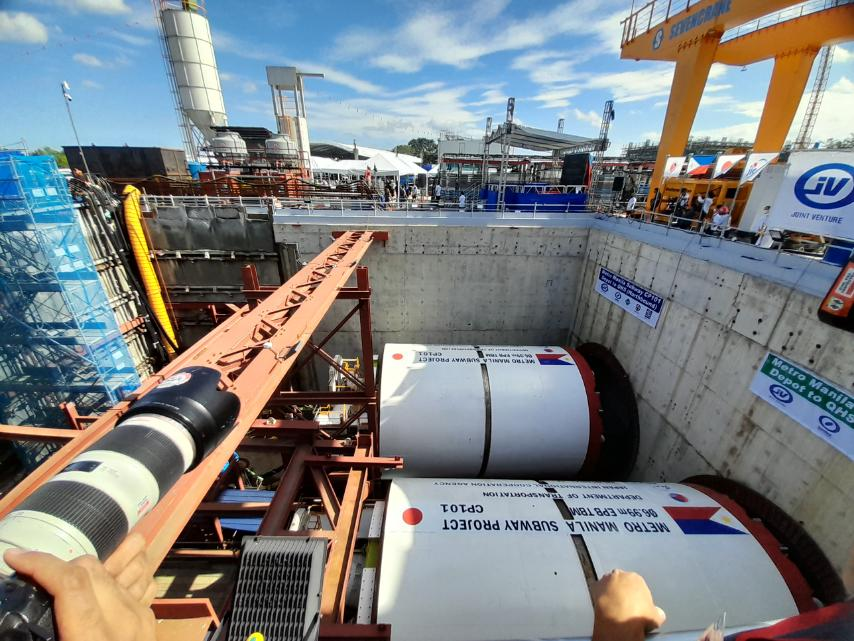
Launch of the Tunnel Boring Machines at Barangay Ugong, Valenzuela. January 9, 2023.

The Metro Manila Subway broke ground on February 27, 2019. Ten months later, construction begun its clearing phase in Valenzuela on December 21. As part of the initial partial operability section (the Qurino Highway, the Tandang Sora, and the North Avenue stations), the first three stations will be built alongside the Philippine Railways Institute (PRI), the country's first-ever railway training center.

Massive tunnel boring machines were to be employed for the project. In September 2020, the Department of Transportation (DOTr) presented one of the six tunnel boring machines in an acceptance test ceremony through a video conference. The first of 25 tunnel boring machines that will be used for the subway's construction was unveiled on February 5, 2021.

On November 11, 2021, a groundbreaking ceremony was held at Camp Aguinaldo to mark the start of pre-construction activities at the Camp Aguinaldo station. Meanwhile, the Ortigas and Shaw stations broke ground on October 3, 2022. Work on the Katipunan and Anonas stations began on February 13, 2023.

The underground and tunnel boring works for the subway were slated to start by the fourth quarter of 2021, but was delayed. The first tunnel boring machine was ceremonially lowered on June 12, 2022, while underground tunnel works began on January 9, 2023.

The line was originally slated to begin partial operations by 2022. However, in April 2022, the DOTr delayed this to 2025, with full operations by 2027, as the COVID-19 pandemic hindered construction. On July 10, 2023, the DOTr scrapped its plan to begin partial operations by 2027, opting instead to fully open the subway by 2029. Challenges related to right of way acquisition have hindered construction progress, with completion as of June 2024 at only 14%. An interagency committee for the two railway projects was established to address issues with the project's alignment. However, during the administration of Bongbong Marcos, it was revealed that these projects, including the subway, were unlikely to be completed by the end of his term in 2028 due to right of way issues. A report indicates that 90% of the land acquisition process was finalized by the end of 2025.

The project is currently undergoing active construction, with the Department of Transportation reporting an overall status of 60% and a physical construction progress of approximately 32% as of July 2026. Significant milestones have been achieved in land acquisition, with the right of way process now 90% complete. Furthermore, tunneling works for the segments spanning from Valenzuela City to Quirino Avenue Station and from North Avenue to Tandang Sora have reached 100% completion. The project remains on track for an initial demonstration run scheduled for 2028, covering the section between Valenzuela and Quirino Station.

== Route ==
Approximate locations of Metro Manila Subway stations

The subway is estimated to be 33 kilometers (21 mi) long. The project involves the construction of 17 stations in its first phase (listed from north to south):

Legend
†	Future terminus

List of stations
Code	Name	Distance (km)		District/Barangay	Connections	Location
Code	Name	Between stations	Total	District/Barangay	Connections	Location
BL01	East Valenzuela †	—	0.000	Ugong	none	Valenzuela
BL02	Talipapa-Sauyo	—	—	Talipapa / Sauyo	Bus routes: 33 Sauyo Road; Quezon City Bus Service: 4 5 Quirino Highway cor. Mindanao Avenue	Quezon City
BL03	St. James	—	—	Tandang Sora/Project 8	Bus routes: 33 Tandang Sora Avenue 33 Road 20; Quezon City Bus Service: 4 5 Tandang Sora Avenue	Quezon City
BL04	Veterans	—	3.886	Project 6	Out-of-station interchange with Manila LRT: North Triangle; Out-of-station interchange with Manila MRT: North Triangle; EDSA Carousel: 1 North Avenue; Bus routes: 18 33 64 North EDSA; Quezon City Bus Service: 4 Road 1	Quezon City
BL05	Quezon Avenue	1.331	5.217	Bagong Pag-asa	Interchange with Manila MRT: Quezon Avenue; EDSA Carousel: 1 Quezon Avenue; Quezon City Bus Service: 6 EDSA	Quezon City
BL06	East Avenue	1.719	6.936	Pinyahan	Bus routes: 6 7 17 34 49 Victoriano Luna Avenue	Quezon City
BL07	Anonas	2.094	9.030	Bagumbuhay	Interchange with Manila LRT: Anonas; Bus routes: 3 Anonas 18 36 39 41 50 51 56 Katipunan Avenue; Quezon City Bus Service: 3 Anonas	Quezon City
BL08	Camp Aguinaldo	1.642	10.672	Camp Aguinaldo	Bus routes: 16 18 36 39 41 50 56 61 Eastwood	Quezon City
BL09	Meralco Avenue	3.075	13.747	Ugong	Out-of-station interchange with Manila MRT: 4 Meralco; Bus routes: 2 Meralco Avenue	Pasig
BL10	Kapitolyo	1.280	15.027	San Antonio/Oranbo	—	Pasig
BL11	Kalayaan Avenue	2.107	17.134	Fort Bonifacio	Bus routes: 4 11th Avenue	Taguig
BL12	Bonifacio Global City	1.075	18.209	Fort Bonifacio	Bus routes: 4 15A 15B 15C 36 39 41 50 61 63 65 Market! Market!	Taguig
BL13	Lawton Avenue	2.199	20.408	Fort Bonifacio	Bus routes: 65 Cyber Sigma	Taguig
BL14	Senate-DepEd	1.734	22.142	Fort Bonifacio	Interchange with PNR: NSCR	Taguig
BL15	FTI	3.988	26.130	Western Bicutan	Interchange with PNR: NSCR; Bus routes: 41 45 62 FTI Taguig City Integrated Terminal Exchange	Taguig
BL16	Bicutan †	3.988	27.825	San Martin de Porres	Interchange with PNR: NSCR; Bus routes: 10 15A 24 36 40 50 Bicutan	Parañaque
↓ Through-services to/from Calamba via North–South Commuter Railway ↓
BL17	Sucat			Sucat	Bus routes: 10 15A 24 36 40 44 50 Sucat	Muntinlupa
BL18	Alabang			Alabang	Bus routes: 10 15A 23 24 36 40 44 50 Vista Terminal Exchange	Muntinlupa
BL19	Muntinlupa			Poblacion	Bus routes: 15B 38 39 46 48 Tunasan	Muntinlupa
BL20	San Pedro			Nueva	Bus routes: 15B 38 39 46 48 United Bayanihan	San Pedro
BL21	Pacita			Pacita 1	Bus routes: 15B 38 39 46 48 Pacita Terminal	San Pedro
BL22	Biñan			San Vicente	Bus routes: 12 25 Biñan Bayan 58 59 Southwoods	Biñan
BL23	Santa Rosa			Tagabo	Bus routes: 11 15C 30 Balibago (Santa Rosa Commercial Complex)	Santa Rosa
BL24	Cabuyao			Barangay I Poblacion	—	Cabuyao
BL25	Banlic			Banlic	—	Calamba
BL26	Calamba †			Real/Halang	—	Calamba
NAIA extension spur line
BW01	NAIA Terminal 3 †	—	—	Villamor	Airports: Ninoy Aquino International Airport Terminal 3; Bus routes: 65 66 NAIA Terminal 3/Runway Manila	Pasay
Stations, lines, and/or other transport connections in italics are either under construction, proposed, unopened, or have been closed.

The following phases of the subway project would involve extending lines up to San Jose del Monte, Bulacan, north of Metro Manila (15.4 kilometers or 9.6 miles from General Luis Avenue in Caloocan), and down to Dasmariñas, Cavite, south of Metro Manila (20.7 kilometers or 12.9 miles from the proposed Ninoy Aquino International Airport station). The entire system, when completed, will serve up to 1.74 million passengers daily.

The initial plan was later modified in June 2020, with DOTr adding the East Valenzuela, Lawton, and Senate stations. The East Valenzuela station will be located in the subway's depot, while the Lawton and Senate stations replaced the Cayetano Boulevard station. However, these modifications are subject to the approval of NEDA and JICA.

DOTr and JICA also propose a physical connection and interoperability between the North–South Commuter Railway and MMS. It proposes MMS rolling stock to switch over to the at-grade NSCR-South tracks around the FTI area, via a physical connection of the tracks and electrical supply, and operate through services to NSCR-South stations from Bicutan towards Calamba and vice versa.

== Design and infrastructure ==
Tunnelling works of the subway from Camp Aguinaldo station

The line will be the fourth heavy rail line in the country, after LRT Line 2, MRT Line 7, and the North–South Commuter Railway, and the first to be mostly underground. It is designed to run trains at 80 kilometers per hour (50 mph). The tunnel diameter inside and outside is projected to be 5.2 meters (17 ft) and 5.65 meters (18.5 ft), respectively. Since there are estimates of an expected magnitude-7.2 earthquake (which can be as powerful as magnitude 7.6) in the Marikina Valley Fault System, it is designed to withstand a magnitude-8.0 earthquake. In addition, it may not be entirely underground. Assessment of the environmental and geographical considerations in the base alignment (initially 74.6 kilometers or 46.4 miles long) recommends 18% of the line to be at-grade and 9% to be running through viaduct. Prior to final approval, some adjustments to the alignment were done so that it would reduce the risk of damage during earthquakes by travelling along solid adobe ground.

On September 5, 2020, in response to questions, Transportation Secretary Arthur Tugade provided assurances that the system would be flood-proof.

=== Stations ===
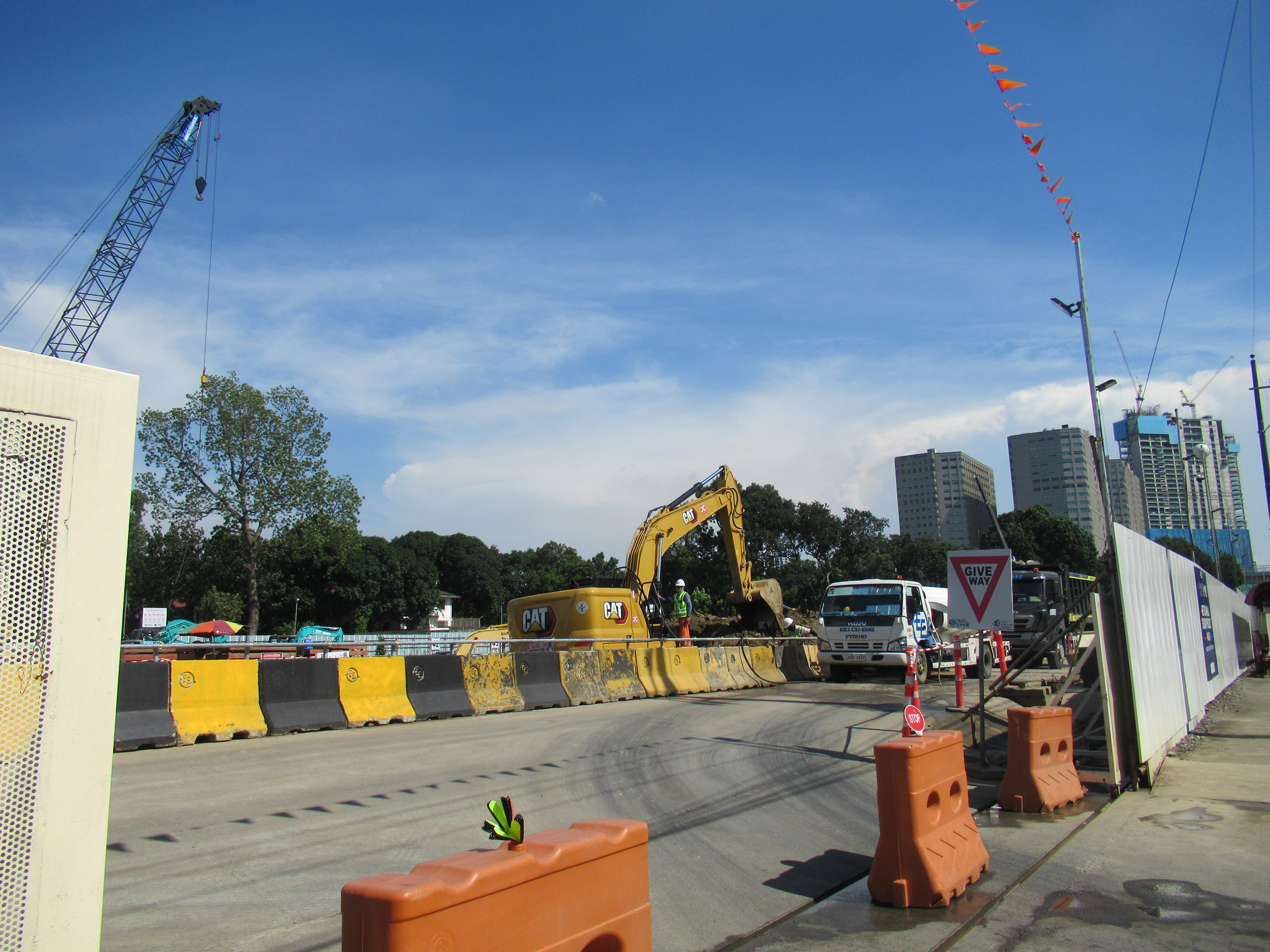
North Avenue Station pre-construction works in Project 6, Quezon City

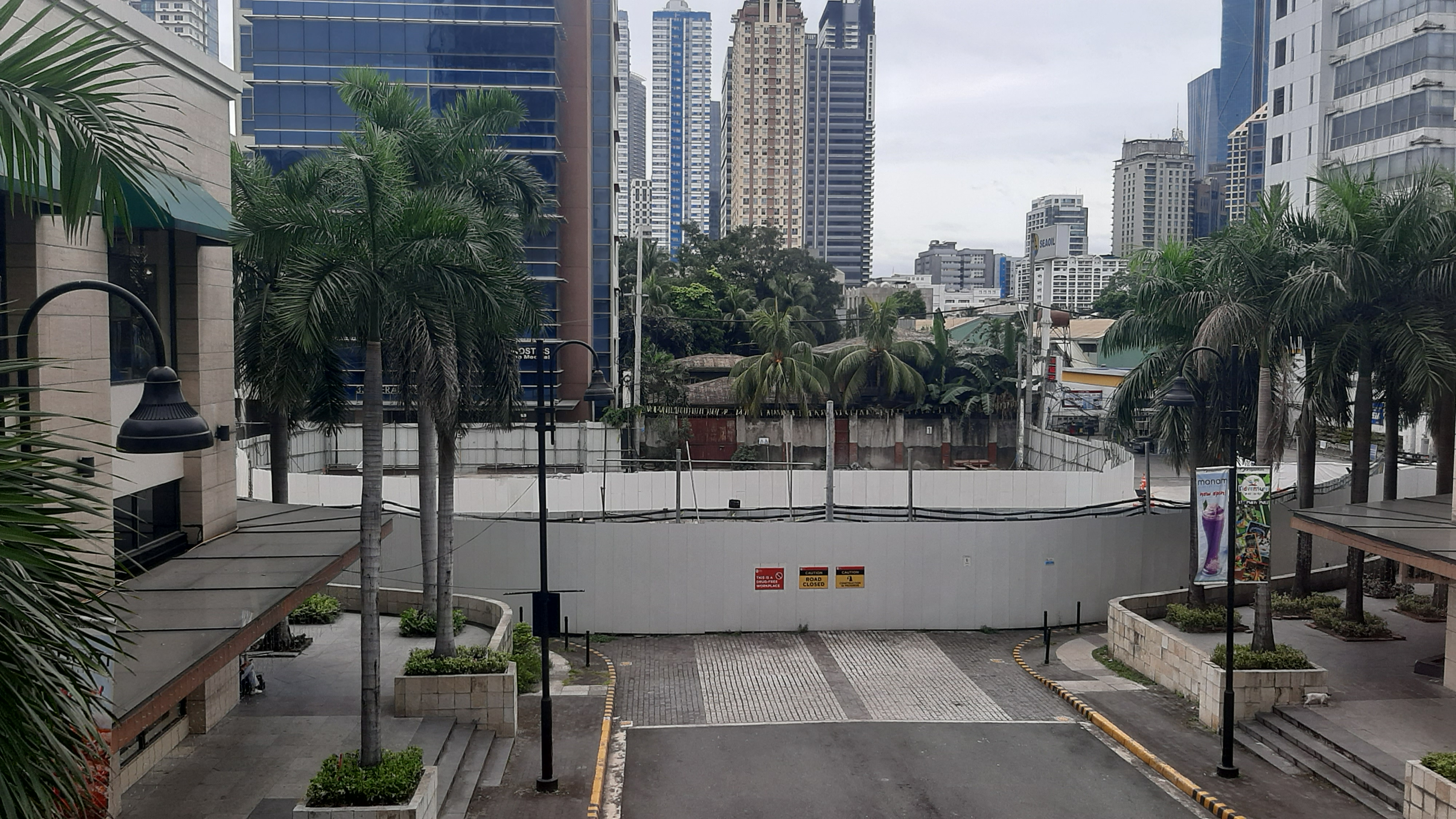
The Shaw Boulevard station of the subway, under construction in January 2025

The stations would have design features such as water-stop panels, a high-level entrance for flood prevention, earthquake detection, and a train stop system, akin to the Tokyo subway. Full-height platform screen doors will also be built in the stations.

The line was planned to feature passing loops at some stations to allow express trains to overtake local trains, however this was removed from later plans and the system is being constructed for a conventional all-stop service pattern.

Seven of the proposed stations, namely NAIA Terminal 3, Bicutan, Senate, Lawton, Katipunan, Quezon Avenue and North Avenue stations will be built on government property in order to boost property values in the surrounding areas.

=== Signalling ===
The line will use a moving block signalling system based on communications-based train control (CBTC), which is the first railway line in the Philippines to use a moving block/CBTC system. Its subsystems include automatic train protection (ATP), automatic train operation (ATO), automatic train supervision (ATS), train detection through track circuits, and computer-based interlocking. Nippon Signal will provide their SPARCS CBTC signalling solution for the line.

=== Tracks ===
Two types of rails will be employed in the subway: 60-kilogram-per-meter (120 lb/yd) rails will be employed in the mainline while 50-kilogram-per-meter (100 lb/yd) rails will be employed in the depot. The rails in the mainline will consist of continuous welded rails while the rails in the depot will be jointed rails with fishplates. The tracks will be supported by concrete sleepers except for the turnouts which will be supported by plastic/fiber-reinforced foam urethane railroad ties.

== Rolling stock ==
The Metro Manila Subway will use Sustina electric multiple units built by the Sumitomo Corporation and Japan Transport Engineering Company (J-TREC). The same type has been ordered by the Philippine National Railways for its North–South Commuter Railway project as the PNR EM1000 class. Hitachi, along with Sumitomo and Mitsubishi, bought bid documents for the design, execution, and completion of 30 train sets in February 2020. An order for 240 railcars, arrangeable into thirty 8-car trainsets, has been finalized by the Department of Transportation on December 21.

Trains will have a capacity of 2,242 passengers, which is more than the normal capacity of the rolling stock of the existing LRT Line 1, LRT Line 2, MRT Line 3, and the PNR Metro Commuter Line. At its base form, it is about twice longer than the 4-car trains of the LRTA 2000 class being used in the LRT Line 2. According to DOTr Undersecretary Timothy John Batan, each 8-car trainset will ease car traffic in Metro Manila equivalent to 1,300 cars, 220 jeepneys, or 60 buses. It will be powered through 1,500 V DC overhead lines similar to those ordered by PNR.

Rolling stock	Sustina EMU
Year	2025–2027
Manufacturer	Sumitomo Corporation; Japan Transport Engineering Company
Model	TBD
Number to be built	240 cars (30 sets)
Formation	8 cars per trainset
Car length	20 m (65 ft 7 in)
Width	2.95 m (9 ft 8 in)
Pantograph lockdown height	4.15 m (13 ft 7 in)
Floor height	1.15 m (3 ft 9 in)
Body material	Lightweight stainless steel
Tare weight	270 t (600,000 lb)
Axle load	16 t (35,000 lb)
Capacity	Leading car: 266 standing, 45 seated Intermediate car: 285 standing, 54 seated Total: 2,242
Seat layout	Rapid transit-style longitudinal seating
Doors per side	4
Traction control	Hybrid SiC–VVVF
Traction power	1,500 V DC overhead catenary
Pantograph type	Single-arm pantograph (Note: Two outward-facing single-arm pantographs shall be used on cars 2 and 6.)
Top speed	120 km/h (75 mph)
Safety system(s)	ATP, ATO
Train configuration	Tc–M–M–T–T–M–M–Tc
Status	Ordered; to be built

=== Depot ===
The line will have a depot in Ugong, Valenzuela, within the vicinity of the East Valenzuela station. It occupies 4 hectares (9.9 acres) of space and serves as the headquarters for the operations and maintenance of the line. The trains are parked on several sets of tracks, which converge onto the spur route and later on to the main network.

A 20,000-square-meter (220,000 sq ft) building will host the Philippine Railways Institute which will also be built within the depot vicinity. In addition, a 900-meter (3,000 ft) test track and mock-ups of the tunnels, stations, and wayside equipment will be constructed for training purposes.

== Future ==
=== Phase 2 and 3 (extensions to Caloocan, Bulacan, Cavite, and Laguna) ===
In the 2023 plan, when the government approves the 194 flagship infrastructure projects, the subway's extension will lead to Bulacan and Cavite. The two routes will cover approximately 40 kilometers (25 mi). Also included in the plan is a 4-kilometer (2.5 mi) extension to Asia World, which will connect to the Paranaque Integrated Terminal Exchange (PITX) and its namesake LRT-1 station. The planned extensions are under study and are expected to be financed by the Asian Development Bank (ADB) under the Infrastructure Preparation and Innovation Facility.

As part of their contract to create a study for the Greater Capital Railways project, South Korean engineering firm Dohwa Engineering Co. Ltd. revealed that the initial scope of the MMSP Phase 2 is divided into 3 projects: a North extension from East Valenzuela station to Langit Road in Caloocan, a south extension from FTI station to Governor's Drive in Dasmariñas, Cavite, and an airport spur extension from the NAIA Terminal 3 station to PITX. Meanwhile, Phase 3 of the project is dubbed "Closing the Loop", where an extension from Phase 2 will lead to the new north and south termini having an interchange with the NSCR in both Bulacan and Laguna.

=== Planned expansions ===
In February 2023, the DOTr announced a collaboration with JICA to add more subways. At the time, transportation secretary Jaime Bautista said that the subways would be expanded to Cavite, and he also said there would be three to four lines. Although it is in the planning stage, it was announced during the state visit of President Marcos to Japan. In the following year, JICA also said there will be future subways, and this time, they also conducted a study for a 30-year railway master plan for the Greater Capital Region.

In January 2026, the DOTr awarded a South Korean-Japanese joint venture, made up of Dohwa Engineering Co. Ltd. and Nippon Koei Co. Ltd., a contract to create a comprehensive study for the Greater Capital Railway master plan, which includes both Phase 2 and Phase 3 of the Metro Manila Subway.
