= East Valenzuela station =

Railway station in Valenzuela, Philippines

East Valenzuela MMS
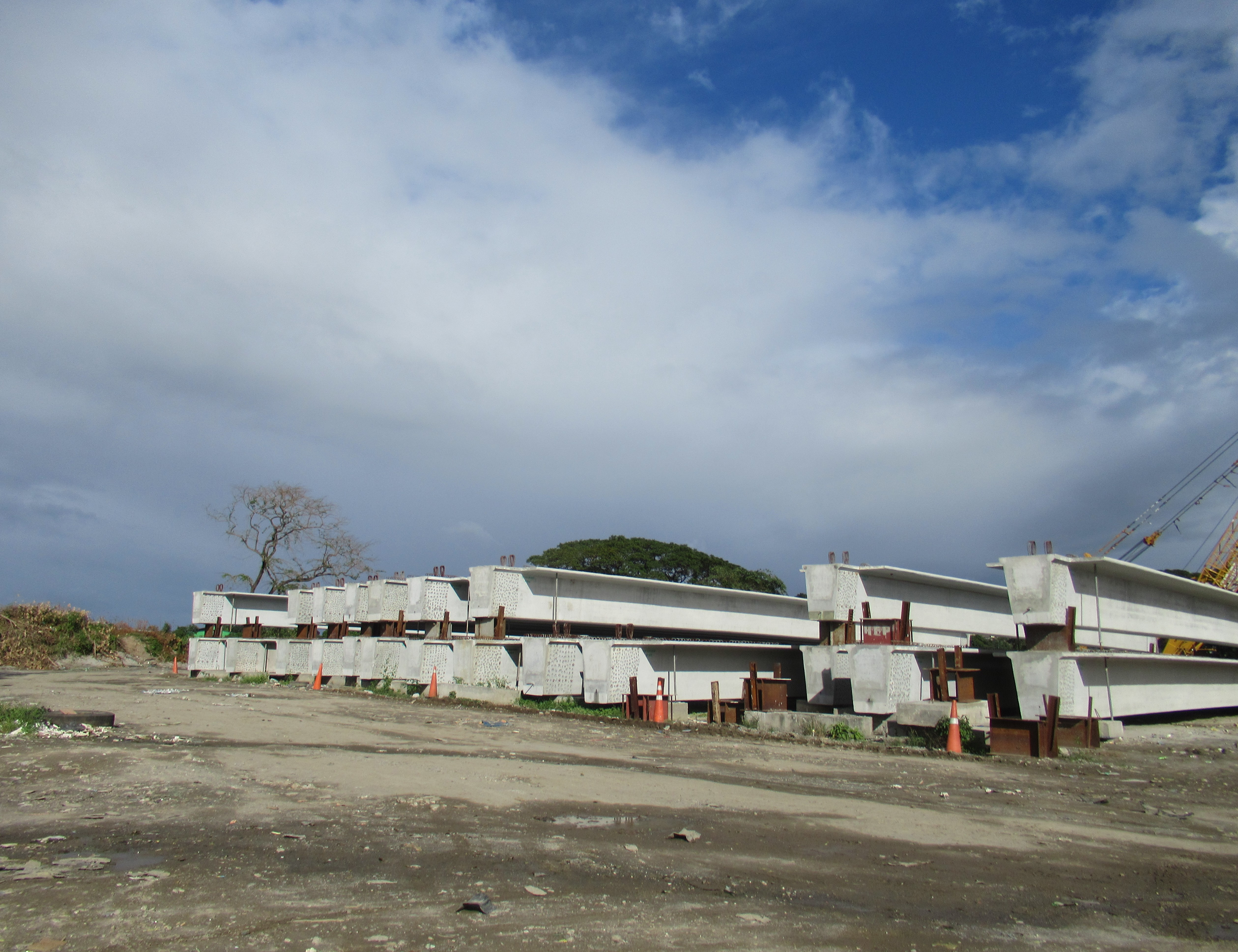
- East Valenzuela station construction along Mindanao Avenue Extension-Ugong Crossing

General information
- Location: Mindanao Avenue; Ugong, Valenzuela, Metro Manila
- Coordinates: 14°42′04″N 121°00′58″E
- Owner: Department of Transportation
- Operator: Department of Transportation
- Line: Metro Manila Subway

Construction
- Structure type: Underground

Other information
- Status: Under construction
- Station code: BL01

History
- Opening: c. 2032

Services
Preceding station	Manila MRT	Following station
Terminus	Metro Manila Subway	Quirino Highway towards FTI or NAIA Terminal 3
Location

East Valenzuela station is an under-construction Metro Manila Subway station located along Mindanao Avenue in Valenzuela, Metro Manila. It will be the northern terminus of the line. It is one of the three stations added to the line when it was modified in June 2020.
