= Iglesia ni Cristo chapel =

Iglesia ni Cristo chapel may refer to:

- Iglesia ni Cristo chapel, Bago Bantay, Quezon City, Philippines
- Iglesia ni Cristo chapel, Capitol, Quezon City, Philippines
- Iglesia ni Cristo chapel, F. Manalo–San Juan, Manila, Philippines
- Iglesia ni Cristo chapel, Makati, Manila, Philippines
- Iglesia ni Cristo chapel, Punta, Santa Ana, Manila, Philippines
- Iglesia ni Cristo chapel, San Francisco del Monte, Quezon City, Philippines
- Iglesia ni Cristo chapel, Tondo, Manila, Philippines
- Iglesia ni Cristo chapel, Washington, D.C., United States
