= Batasan (disambiguation) =

Batasan and Batasang Pambansa commonly refers to the Batasang Pambansa Complex, the seat of the House of Representatives of the Philippines.

Batasan and Batasang Pambansa may also refer to:

- Batasan Hills
- Batasan Road
- Batasan station
- Batasang Bayan
- Batasang Pambansa (legislature)
  - Interim Batasang Pambansa
  - Regular Batasang Pambansa
