= Manggahan station =

Station under construction in Quezon City

ML07	Manggahan
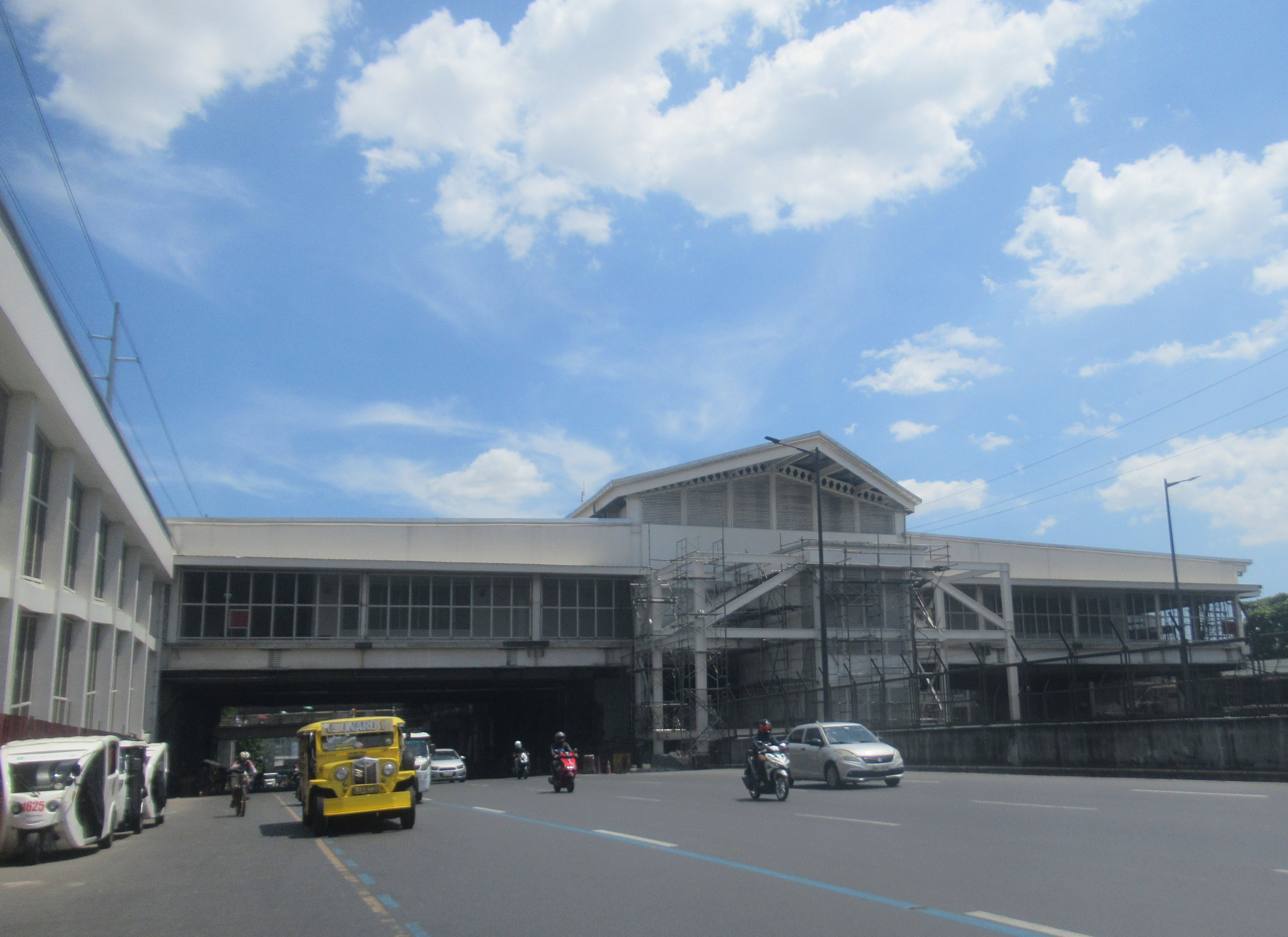
- Construction of Manggahan station as of May 2026

General information
- Location: Commonwealth Avenue; Barangay Commonwealth, Quezon City; Philippines
- Coordinates: 14°41′51″N 121°05′14″E
- Owner: SMC Mass Rail Transit 7 Inc.
- Line: MRT Line 7
- Distance: 8.786 km (5.459 mi)
- Platforms: 1 island platform
- Tracks: 2

Construction
- Structure type: At-grade
- Accessible: Yes

Other information
- Status: Under construction

History
- Opening: 2027
- Former names: North Batasan

Services
Preceding station	Manila MRT	Following station
Batasan towards North EDSA	MRT Line 7	Doña Carmen towards San Jose Del Monte
Location

Manggahan station is an under-construction at-grade Metro Rail Transit (MRT) station served by the MRT Line 7 (MRT-7) located in Quezon City. The station is the seventh station for trains headed to San Jose Del Monte and the eighth station for trains headed to North EDSA.

This is the only at-grade level station in the entire MRT-7 line.

== History ==
The station's previous working name is North Batasan since it is near the north end of the Batasan Road.

As of 31 January 2023, the project is 66.07% complete. The station's construction was scheduled to be finished by June of the same year, but was pushed to the 2026, while the target for full operation is in 2027.

== Nearby landmarks ==
The closest landmarks include the Commonwealth and Litex Public Markets, the Commonwealth Elementary and High School, Iglesia ni Cristo Locale of Capitol, and the under-construction Kristong Hari Parish Church.
