= Commonwealth Avenue (Quezon City) =

Major road in Quezon City, Philippines

Coordinates: 14°39′22″N 121°3′22″E

R-7 Commonwealth Avenue
- Don Mariano Marcos Avenue
- Map of Commonwealth Avenue in Metro Manila

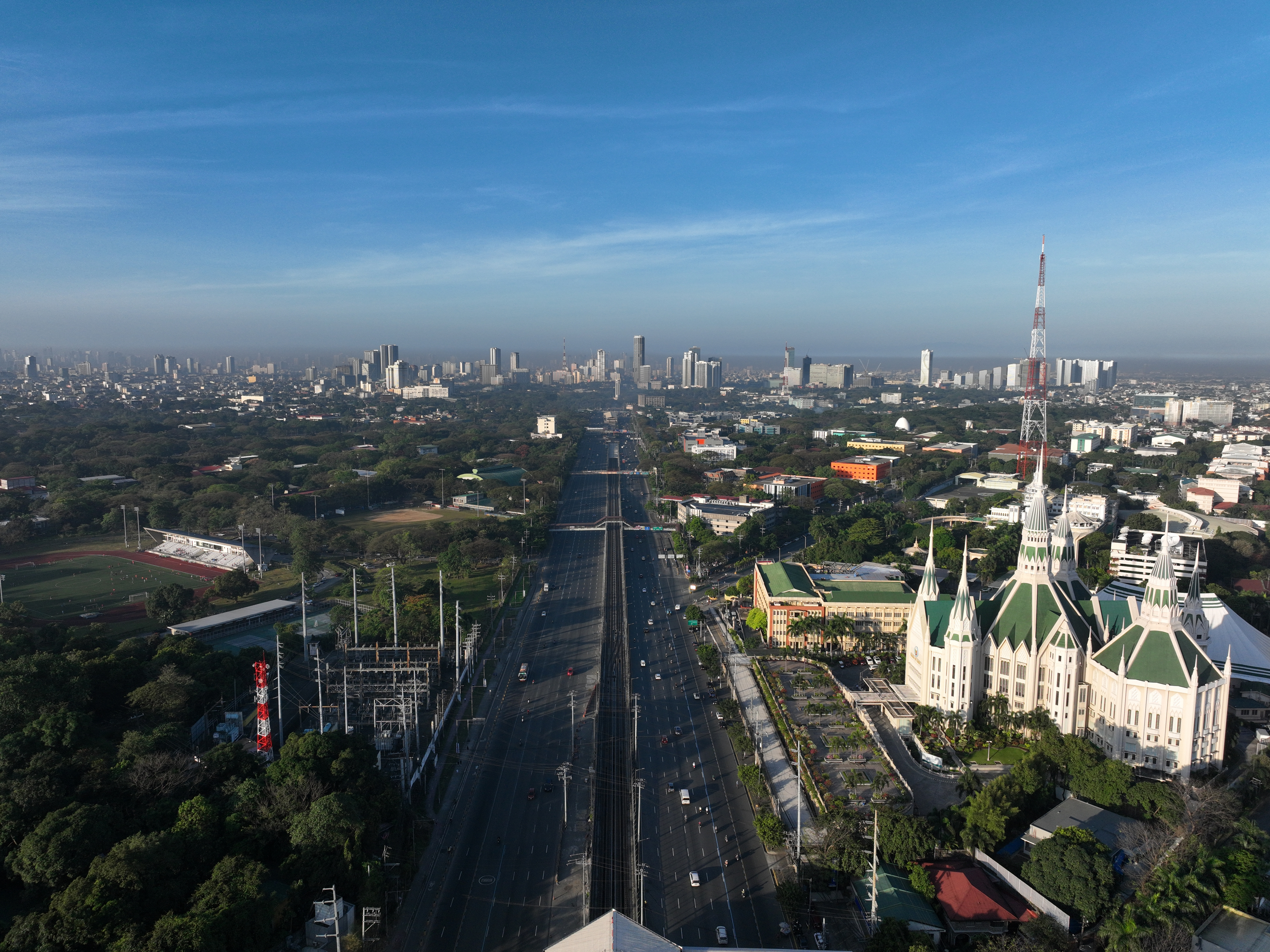
- Aerial view of Commonwealth Avenue (2026)

Route information
- Length: 12.712 km (7.899 mi)
- Existed: 1960s–present
- Component highways: R-7 R-7; N170

Major junctions
- South end: N170 (Elliptical Road)
- N175 (University Avenue); N129 (Tandang Sora Avenue)
- North end: N129 (Quirino Highway)

Location
- Country: Philippines
- Major cities: Quezon City

Highway system
- Roads in the Philippines; Highways; Expressways; List

Commonwealth Avenue, formerly known as Don Mariano Marcos Avenue, (Note: Named after Mariano Marcos, who was the father of President Ferdinand Marcos and the grandfather of President Bongbong Marcos.) is a 12.4-kilometer (7.7 mi) highway located in Quezon City, Philippines. It spans six to eighteen lanes, making it the widest road in the country. The avenue is one of the major roads in Metro Manila and is designated as part of Radial Road 7 (R-7) of the older Manila arterial road system and National Route 170 (N170) of the Philippine highway network.

Commonwealth Avenue starts at Elliptical Road, which encircles the Quezon Memorial Circle. It passes through the areas of Philcoa, Tandang Sora, Balara, Batasan Hills, and Fairview and ends at Quirino Highway in the Novaliches area.

Being located in Quezon City, which is among several cities in Metro Manila with a high incidence of road accidents, the avenue has a high accident rate, particularly due to overspeeding, earning it the nickname "Killer Highway". A speed limit of 60 kilometers per hour (37 mph) is being enforced to reduce accidents on the avenue.

== Route description ==
Commonwealth Avenue follows a curving route from Elliptical Road to Quirino Highway. It is divided into two portions: the eighteen-lane main segment, formerly Don Mariano Marcos Avenue, and the six-to-eight-lane Fairview Avenue. The Fairview Rotonda, a roundabout at the intersection with Doña Carmen Street at the barangay boundary of Commonwealth and Fairview, marks the division between the two segments.

The main segment, formerly Don Mariano Marcos Avenue (after Mariano Marcos, the father of former President Ferdinand Marcos), stretches south of Fairview Rotonda. It features partial access control with interchanges and U-turn slots replacing at-grade intersections and pedestrian crossings placed on overpasses (footbridges). This segment has 18 lanes, with nine lanes per direction, excluding dedicated lanes for motorcycles, buses, jeepneys, and bicycles. An exclusive motorcycle lane, implemented in March 2023, restricts motorcycles to the third lane except when entering or exiting the highway. As of 2025, motorcycles with a engine displacement greater than 400 cubic centimeters (24 cu in) are exempted from the motorcycle lane restriction but are prohibited from lane splitting.

On the other hand, Fairview Avenue, north of Fairview Rotonda, has 6 to 8 lanes, and most intersections are at-grade, usually with traffic lights.

Being located in Quezon City, which has a high number of road accidents, Commonwealth Avenue has a high incidence of accidents along with Quezon Avenue. The number of accidents on the avenue has lent it its nickname, the "Killer Highway".

=== Bicycle lanes ===
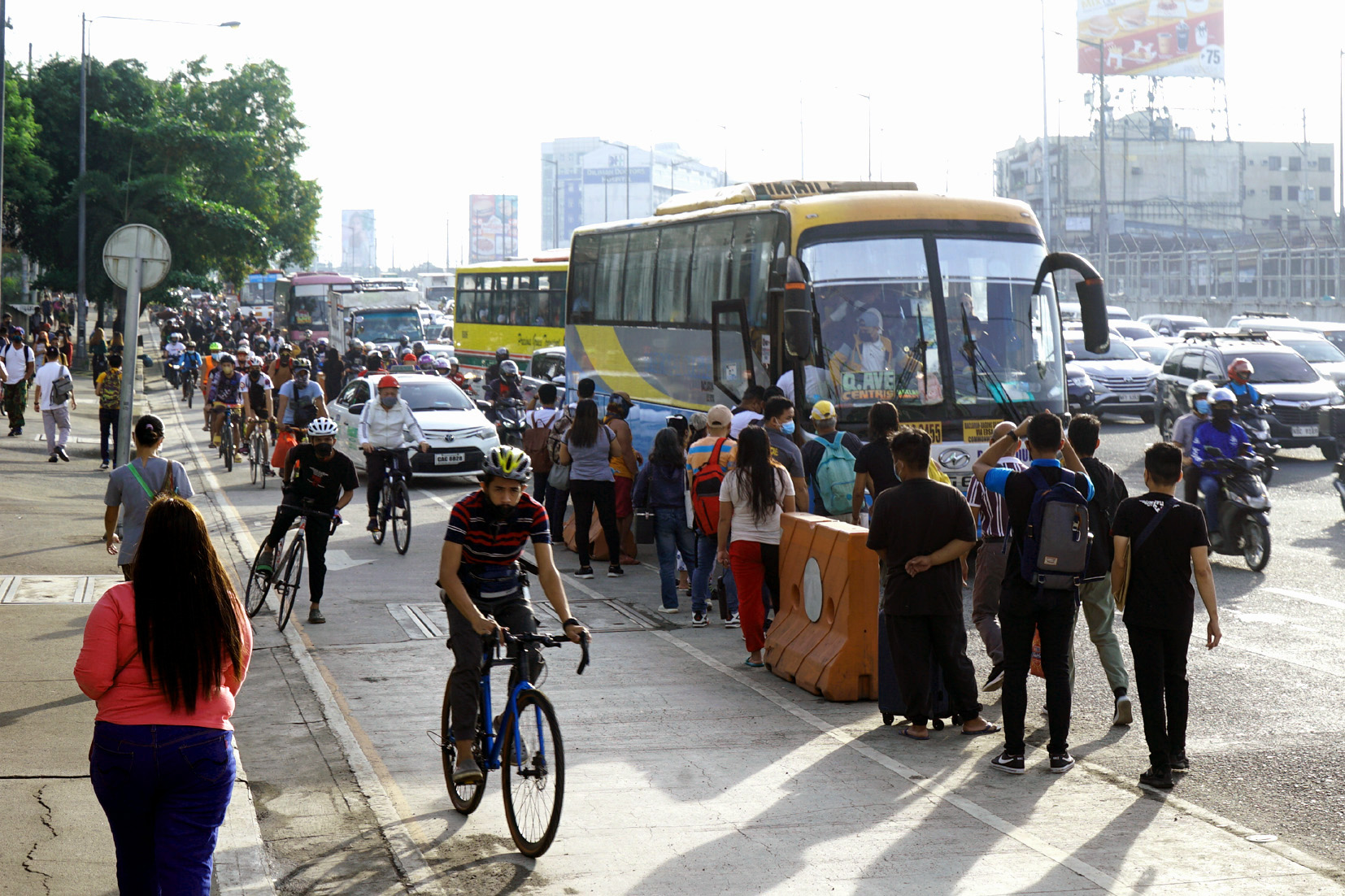
Cyclists using the bike lane along Commonwealth Avenue

The outermost lanes of Commonwealth Avenue from Quezon Memorial Circle to Doña Carmen Avenue are designated as bi-directional bike lanes with plastic barriers and 0.6-meter (2.0 ft) buffer zones on both sides as part of Quezon City's bike lane network. A portion of the bike lane also uses concrete plant boxes instead of plastic barriers, with the city planning to replace plastic barriers with plant boxes.

Before the establishment of the city bike lane network during the COVID-19 pandemic, a bi-directional grade-separated bike lane was established by the MMDA in 2012 along a 2.92-kilometer (1.81 mi) segment of the highway from University Avenue to Tandang Sora.

=== MRT Line 7 ===
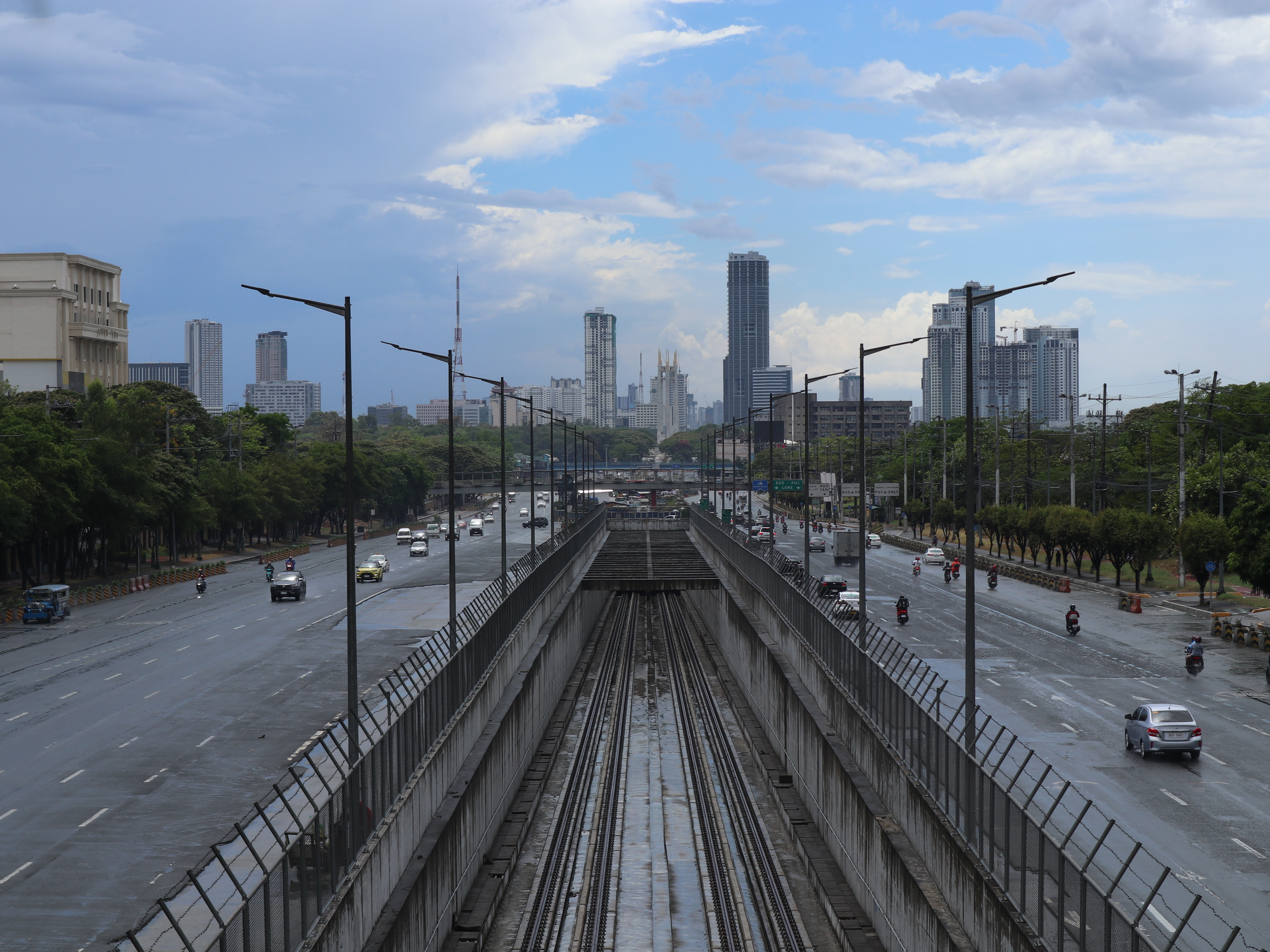
MRT 7 rail tracks near U.P.–Ayala Land TechnoHub

The Metro Rail Transit Line 7 (MRT 7), which will connect with the Metro Rail Transit Line 3 at North Triangle Common Station, began construction in 2016. Most of its alignment will follow the center island of Commonwealth Avenue up to Regalado Highway.

== History ==
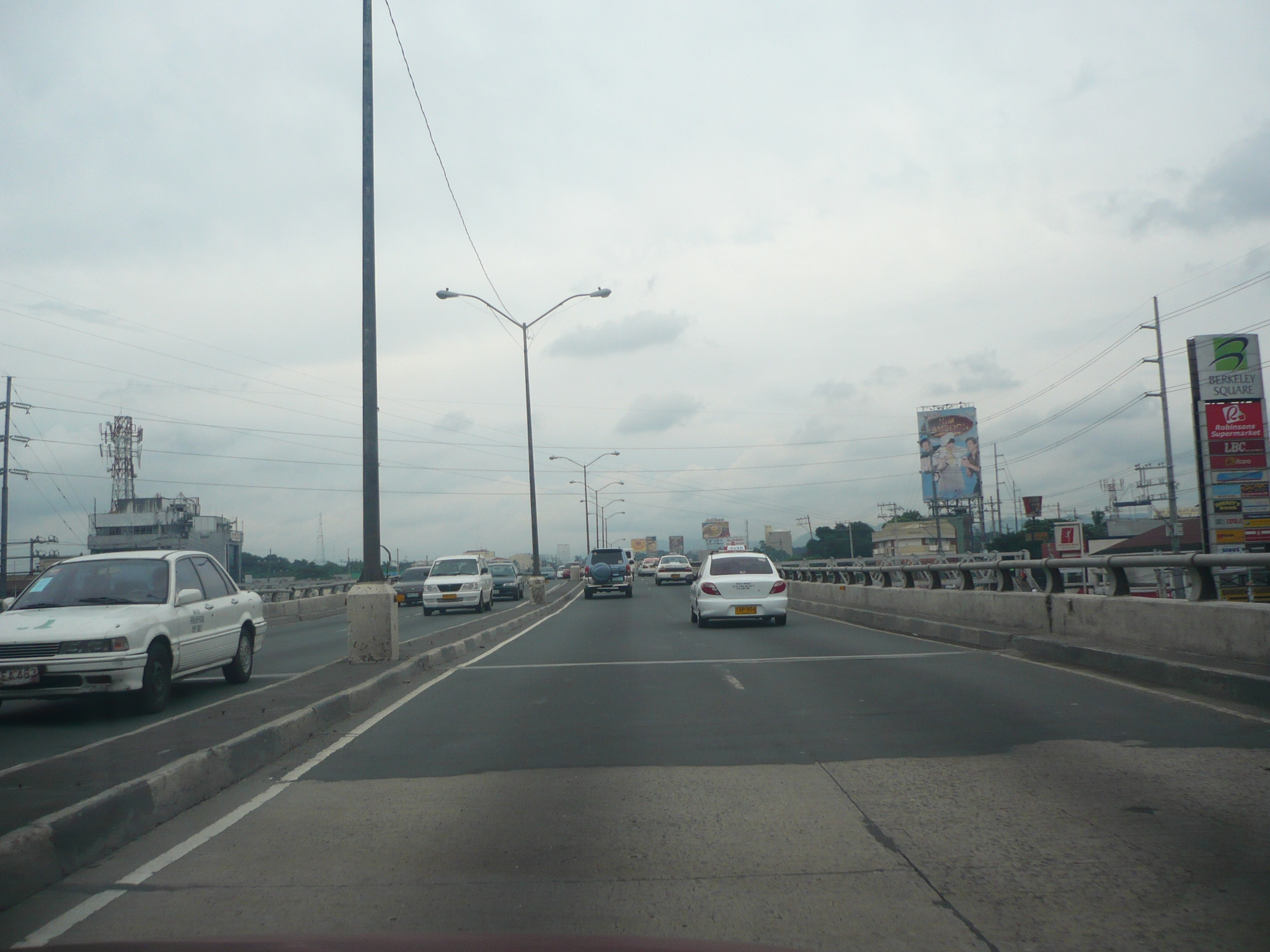
Commonwealth Avenue in Tandang Sora in 2008, prior to the construction of the Commonwealth Avenue–C-5 flyover and the MRT-7

The avenue's origins can be traced back to a segment of a road that connected the proposed site of the National Capitol in what is now Elliptical Road to the University of the Philippines Diliman campus and comprises what is now University Avenue. The original 1941 Frost Plan envisioned a road network connecting the proposed Capitol to the proposed Philippine Military Academy (PMA) through barrio Balara. However, by 1949, the revised Frost Plan shifted focus to constructing a road directly connecting Quezon Memorial Circle, which replaced the original Capitol site that was scrapped after World War II, to the new National Government Center (location of the present-day Batasang Pambansa Complex) at Constitution Hill, which replaced the proposed PMA site.

Originally named Don Mariano Marcos Avenue, the avenue was eventually constructed in the late 1960s as a two-lane highway. The plan connecting Quezon Memorial Circle with the new National Government Center came into fruition, with the road being built up to the present-day Payatas Road. Quezon City was then the capital of the Philippines, and embassies were to be put up on the stretch of highway, as well as judiciary and legislative buildings at Constitution Hill. Because the country's capital was moved back to Manila in 1976, other establishments were put up instead. Don Mariano Marcos Avenue was later renamed into two parts, Commonwealth Avenue and Quezon Avenue. Later, Commonwealth Avenue regained the eight-lane Fairview Avenue, which used to end near Jordan Plains Subdivision in Novaliches. Fairview Avenue was the later addition that occupied the formerly proposed right-of-way of Circumferential Road 6.

In the 1980s, the road was widened into a six-lane highway. During the late 1990s and early 2000s, the avenue was prone to heavy traffic and accidents due to increasing public utility vehicles plying the highway and sidewalk vendors crowding onto the road. In the late 2000s, the Metropolitan Manila Development Authority (MMDA) cleared the sidewalk vendors, especially in the Tandang Sora area, which was prone to heavy rush hour traffic. Fairview Avenue uses stoplights and center island splittings at its intersections, while Don Mariano Marcos Avenue uses interchanges at its intersections.

The avenue is 18 lanes at its widest. It is the widest road in the Philippines, beating the old record set by EDSA.

=== Linking to Quirino Highway ===
On October 1, 2009, Quezon City Mayor Feliciano Belmonte Jr. announced his 15-year-old plan to link Commonwealth Avenue and Quirino Highway at a cost of ₱20 million to ₱140 million, adjacent to the Zabarte Road. The project was completed in May 2011 and is already operational.

=== Speed limit implementation ===
In May 2011, a 60-kilometer-per-hour (37 mph) speed limit was implemented on Commonwealth Avenue following the death of journalist Lourdes Estella-Simbulan in a road accident on the avenue. During the first week of its implementation, 120 violators were apprehended after speeds of over 60 kilometers per hour (37 mph) were recorded through speed guns.

== Renaming proposals ==
The Central Temple along this avenue in Quezon City was completed in 1984, and is the only INC building to date that is called a temple (that is, Templo Central). According to Architect Carlos A. Santos-Viola, in designing INC edifices, he had to create a style that "cannot be mistaken for any other sect except Iglesia." He also related how Felix Manalo considered the Gothic architecture as the "most religious type of architecture" for its verticality, which was interpreted as "pointing towards heaven."

Some members of the House of Representatives filed bills to rename the avenue into Eraño G. Manalo Avenue, after Eraño Manalo, the second Executive Minister of the Iglesia ni Cristo. The church's central temple is located along the avenue, and Manalo is interred there. Meanwhile, the Makabayan bloc wanted to rename the avenue after former Filipino senator Lorenzo Tañada.

== Intersections ==
The entire route is located in Quezon City. The list includes the section of the avenue named "Fairview Avenue". Kilometers are measured from Rizal Park, the Kilometer Zero.

| km | mi | Destinations | Notes |
|---|---|---|---|
| 12.491 | 7.762 | N170 (Elliptical Road) | Quezon Memorial Circle, southern terminus. Continues to Manila as Quezon Avenue. |
| | | Masaya Street | Accessible from southbound lanes via U-turn slot. Access to U.P. Village, Teachers Village and Kalayaan Avenue. |
| 12.879– 13.051 | 8.003– 8.110 | N175 (University Avenue) | Accessible from southbound lanes via U-turn slot. Access to University of the Philippines Diliman. |
| | | Central Avenue | Accessible from northbound lanes via U-turn slot. Access to New Era University and Iglesia Ni Cristo Central Temple |
| | | Tandang Sora Avenue | Right turns only. Flyover closed due to MRT Line 7 construction. |
| | | N129 (Luzon Avenue/C-5 Road) | Access to Luzon Avenue residential areas. |
| | | Zuzuarregui Street | Southern segment has access to Broadcast City |
| | | Holy Spirit Street, Capitol Homes Drive | Holy Spirit Street intersection accessible from northbound lanes via U-turn slot. Capitol Homes Drive intersection accessible from southbound lanes via U-turn slot. Access to Ever Gotesco Commonwealth. |
| | | IBP Road | Accessible from southbound lanes via U-turn slot. Access to Batasang Pambansa on both ends. Access to Payatas Road and the municipality of Rodriguez (Montalban) at the northern end. Future access to Southeast Metro Manila Expressway. |
| 20.382– 20.682 | 12.665– 12.851 | Doña Carmen Street | Roundabout. Access to Don Jose Heights. Name change from Commonwealth Avenue to Fairview Avenue. Change from 18-lane road to 6-lane road. |
| 22.041 | 13.696 | Regalado Avenue | Traffic light intersection |
| 23.242 | 14.442 | Regalado Highway | Traffic light intersection. No left turns from southbound lanes. Access to SM City Fairview. |
| | | Mindanao Avenue | Traffic light intersection |
| 25.203 | 15.660 | N127 (Quirino Highway) | Northern terminus. |
1.000 mi = 1.609 km; 1.000 km = 0.621 mi: Incomplete access

== Landmarks ==
This is from Elliptical Road in its southern end, to Quirino Highway in the northern end, all in Quezon City.

- Philippine Coconut Authority
- University Avenue station
- U.P.–Ayala Land TechnoHub
- Commission on Human Rights
- INC Central Temple
- Tandang Sora station
- Mary the Queen College of Quezon City
- Don Antonio station
- Ever Gotesco Commonwealth
- St. Peter Parish of Quezon City
- Batasan station
- Sandiganbayan
- Commission on Audit
- Litex Market
- Manggahan station
- Commonwealth Elementary School
- Doña Carmen station
- Regalado Avenue station
