= Batasan–San Mateo Road =

Road in the Philippines

Coordinates: 14°41′8″N 121°6′9″E

- IBP–San Mateo Road
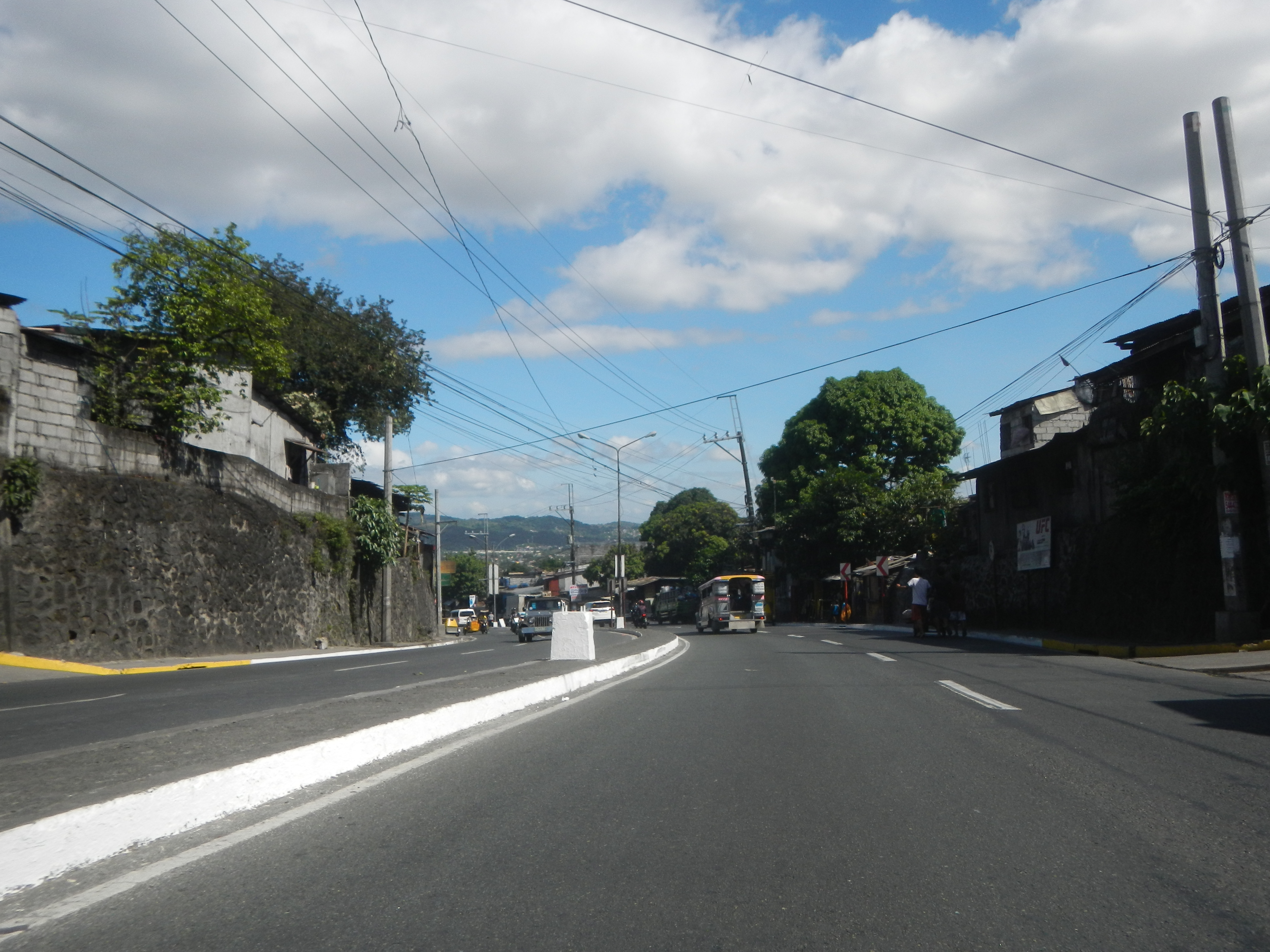
- Batasan–San Mateo Road facing towards San Mateo, Rizal
- Interactive map of Batasan–San Mateo Road
- Former name: Constitutional Road
- Type: National tertiary road
- Maintained by: Department of Public Works and Highways – Quezon City 1st District Engineering Office & Rizal 2nd District Engineering Office
- Length: 2.295 km (1.426 mi); Maximum length (westbound)
- West end: Batasan Road in Quezon City
- East end: General Luna Street & C-6 Kambal Road in San Mateo, Rizal

The Batasan–San Mateo Road (also known as the IBP–San Mateo Road; formerly the Constitutional Road) is a four-lane east–west highway connecting Quezon City and San Mateo, Rizal in the Philippines.

The road begins at the intersection with the Batasan Road in Batasan Hills, Quezon City, adjacent to the Batasang Pambansa complex. It passes through the areas of Filinvest II Subdivision, which also includes Northview I and II, the former site of Batasan Hills Elementary School, San Antonio de Padua Church, a temple of the Church of Jesus Christ of Latter-day Saints, a branch of Puregold Jr. adjacent to the temple, Sunnyside Hills Subdivision, the Batasan-San Mateo Bridge crossing the Marikina River, Felicidad Village in San Mateo and ends at the intersection with General Luna Street. It is continued to the east by C-6 Kambal Road.
