= Batasan station =

Train station in Quezon City, Philippines

ML06	Batasan
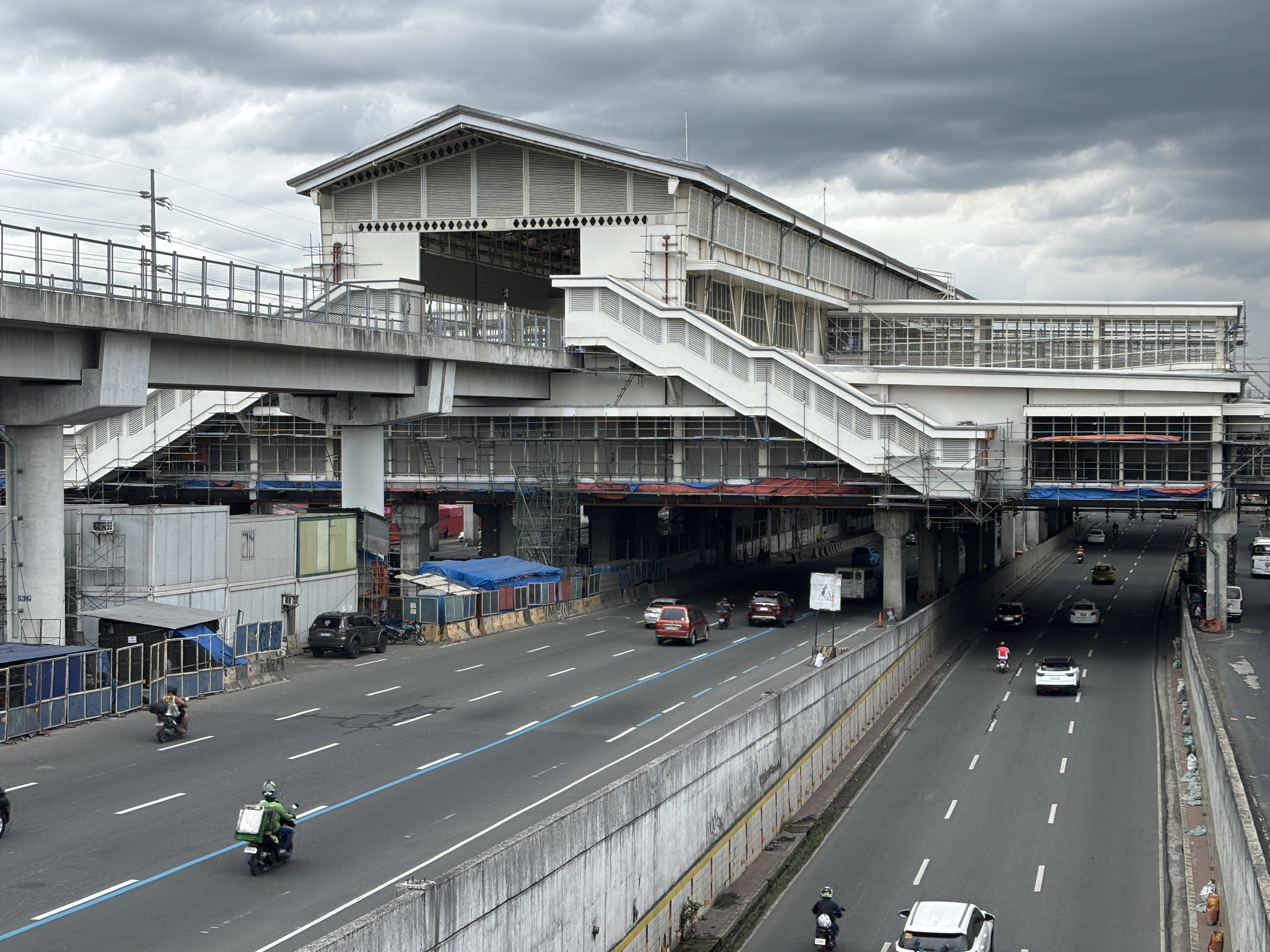
- The station under construction in March 2025

General information
- Other names: South Batasan
- Location: Commonwealth Avenue; Batasan Hills, Quezon City; Philippines
- Coordinates: 14°41′06″N 121°05′11″E
- Owner: SMC-Mass Rail Transit 7 Incorporated
- Line: MRT Line 7
- Platforms: 2 side platforms
- Tracks: 2
- Connections: 6 7 49 Batasan Road; Sandiganbayan; 2 Maclang General Hospital

Construction
- Structure type: Elevated
- Platform levels: 2; one concourse and one platform
- Accessible: yes

Other information
- Status: Under construction

History
- Opening: 2027

Services
Preceding station	Manila MRT	Following station
Don Antonio towards North EDSA	MRT Line 7	Manggahan towards San Jose Del Monte
Location

Batasan station is an under-construction Metro Rail Transit (MRT) station located on the MRT Line 7 (MRT-7) system in Batasan Hills, Quezon City, Philippines. It is near the Sandiganbayan Centennial Building, Public Attorney's Office Building, Batasan TODA Terminal, the Commission on Audit Complex and the Batasan Pambansa Complex. It is the ninth station for trains headed towards the North Triangle Common Station and the sixth station for trains headed to San Jose del Monte.

== History ==
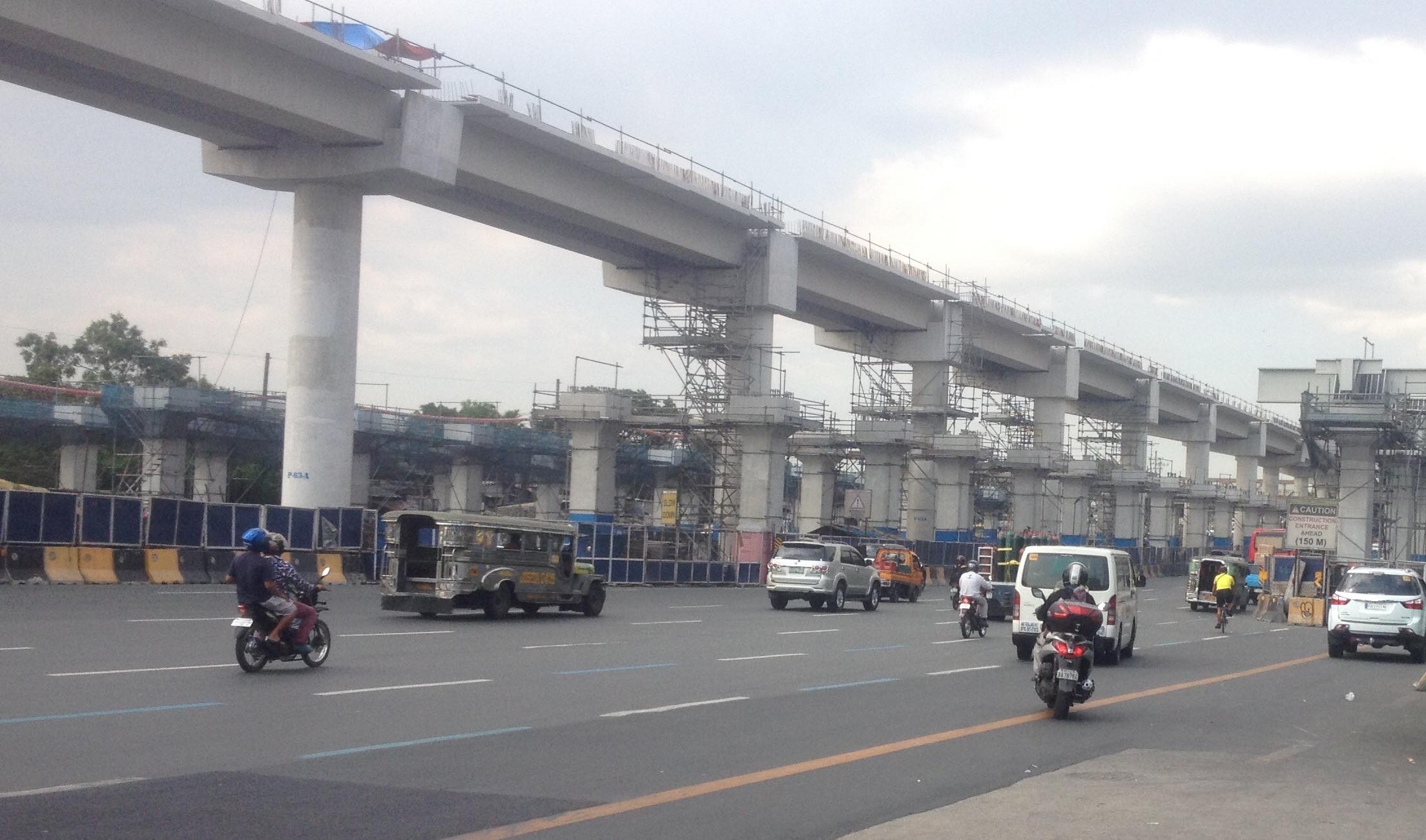
Construction progress of Batasan station as of March 23, 2019.

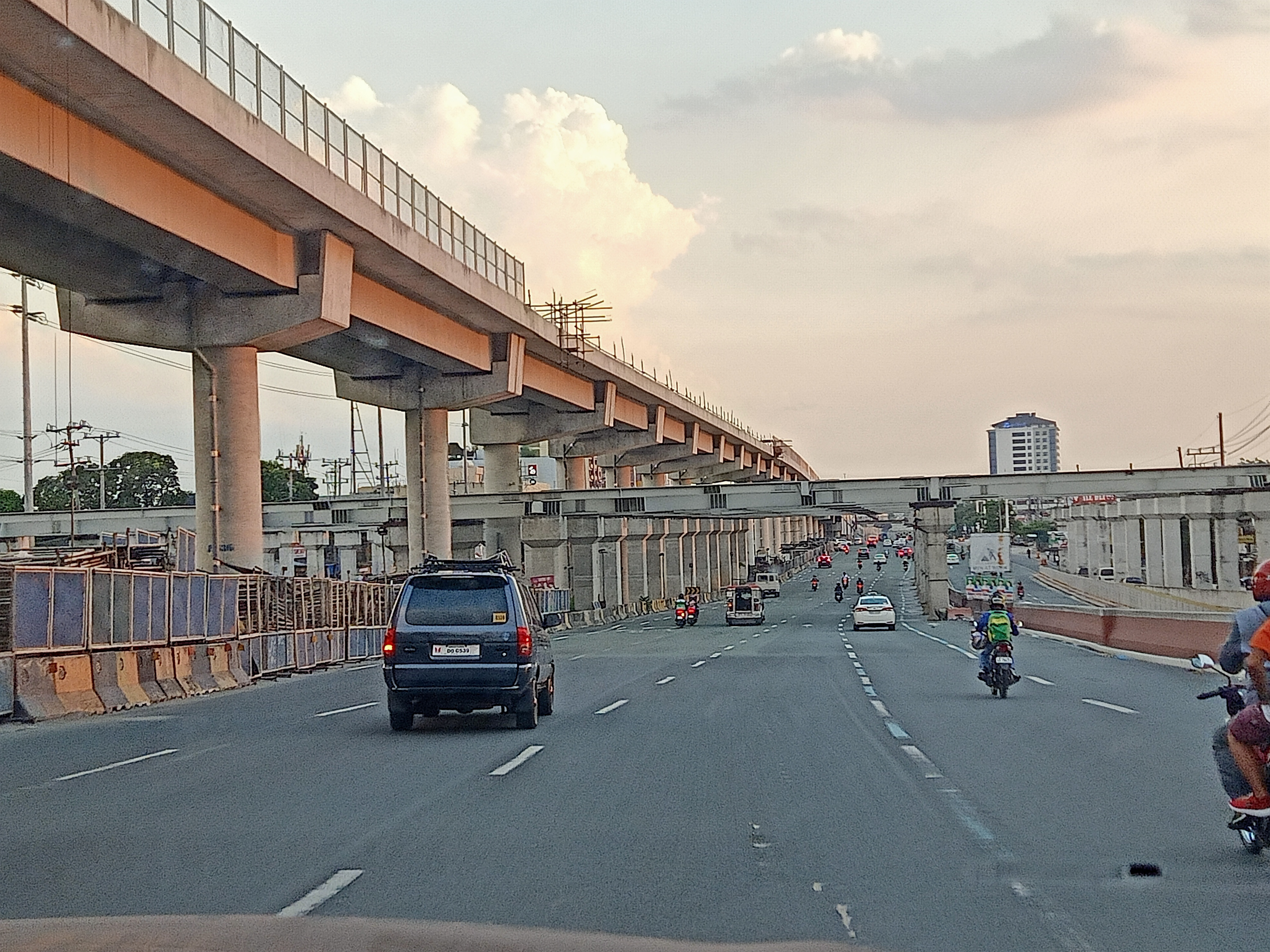
Construction of Batasan station in April 2022

Batasan station is part of the MRT Line 7, which was proposed initially in 2004. The line was supposed to begin its construction in 2005 with a target opening date in 2007. However, construction did not start until 2017, a decade after its target opening date. Groundbreaking of the station began on October 7, 2017, with a simple ceremony being held before the concrete pouring for the station's bored pile foundations.

The official working name of the station during the design phase is Station 6. It is also known by another previous working name: South Batasan. It was named so because it is located at the southern end of Batasan Road while Manggahan station was previously called as North Batasan.

As of 31 January 2023, the project is 66.07% complete; the station's construction is to be finished by June of the same year.

During the southwest monsoon rains of July 2025, the station was flagged by the Metro Manila Development Authority as a possible contributor to the severe flooding along Commonwealth Avenue area, citing obstructions from its columns, footing wall, and manhole over drainage culverts. However, MRT-7 Project Management Office denied this, asserting that all station structures were built outside drainage lines based on approved plans, and blamed the flooding on clogged drains caused by plastic waste and debris.

== Station details ==
Batasan station is a part of the MRT Line 7, which runs from San Jose del Monte, Bulacan up to North Avenue, Quezon City. It is the sixth northbound station from the North Triangle Common Station in Quezon City and the ninth southbound station from San Jose del Monte.

Once completed, Batasan station will be connected to bus and tricycle routes near several government buildings. It will serve the Batasang Pambansa Complex, Commission on Audit Complex, Public Attorneys Office Building, and Sandiganbayan Centennial Building. A tricycle station along the southern end of Batasan Road will provide access to the rest of Batasan Hills. Batasan station will also be connected to the Quezon City Bus Service Route 2 via Maclang General Hospital.
