= National Assembly of the Philippines (disambiguation) =

The National Assembly of the Philippines was the national legislature of the Philippines from 1935 to 1941. It may also refer to:

- Malolos Congress, also known as the National Assembly
- National Assembly (Second Philippine Republic)
- Philippine Assembly, the lower house of the Philippine Legislature from 1907 to 1916
- Batasang Pambansa (legislature), also known as National Assembly

== See also ==
- Batasan (disambiguation)
