= Don Antonio station =

Train station in Quezon City, Philippines

ML05	Don Antonio
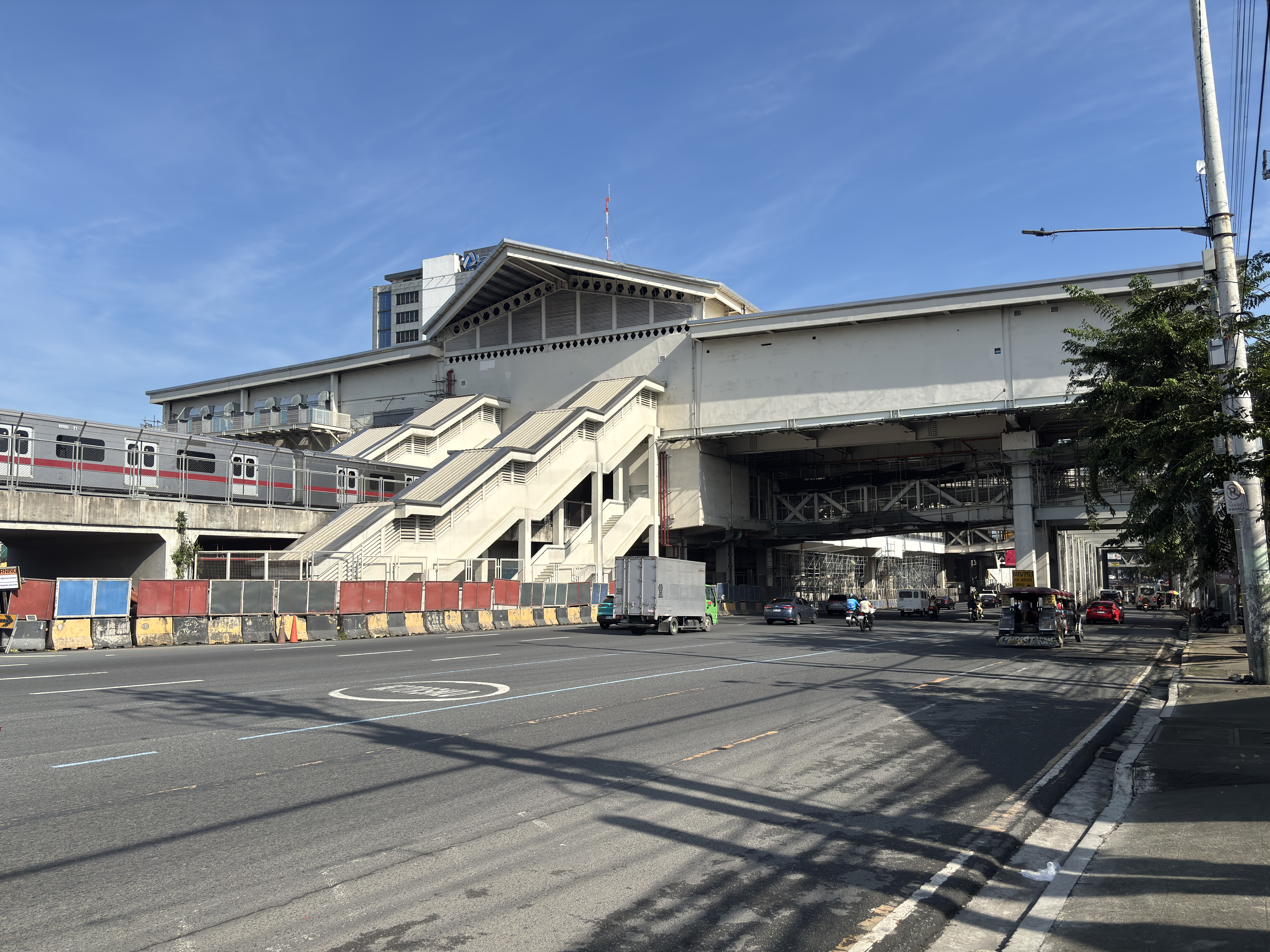
- Don Antonio station construction progress as of November 2025

General information
- Location: Commonwealth Avenue; Matandang Balara and Holy Spirit, Quezon City; Philippines
- Coordinates: 14°40′37″N 121°04′57″E
- Owner: SMC-Mass Rail Transit 7 Incorporated
- Line: MRT Line 7
- Platforms: 2 side platforms
- Tracks: 2
- Connections: 6 7 49 Ever Gotesco

Construction
- Structure type: Elevated
- Platform levels: 2; one concourse and one platform
- Accessible: yes

Other information
- Status: Under construction

History
- Opening: 2027

Services
Preceding station	Manila MRT	Following station
Tandang Sora towards North EDSA	MRT Line 7	Batasan towards San Jose Del Monte
Location

Don Antonio station is an under-construction Metro Rail Transit (MRT) station located on the MRT Line 7 (MRT-7) system along Commonwealth Avenue in Holy Spirit, Quezon City. Its working title was Station 5.

As of 31 January 2023, the project is 66.07% complete. The station's construction is to be finished by 2026, while the target for full operation is in 2027.

== Station details ==
Don Antonio station is located along the barangay boundary of Matandang Balara and Holy Spirit, Quezon City, along Commonwealth Avenue. It is apparently named after the adjacent Don Antonio area. Once completed, it will serve two nearby shopping establishments, such as Shopwise Commonwealth and Ever Gotesco. It will be connected to various local bus routes via the Ever Gotesco bus stop, as well as the Quezon City Bus Service Route 2 via St. Peter Parish.
