= Doña Carmen station =

Train station in Quezon City, Philippines

ML08	Doña Carmen
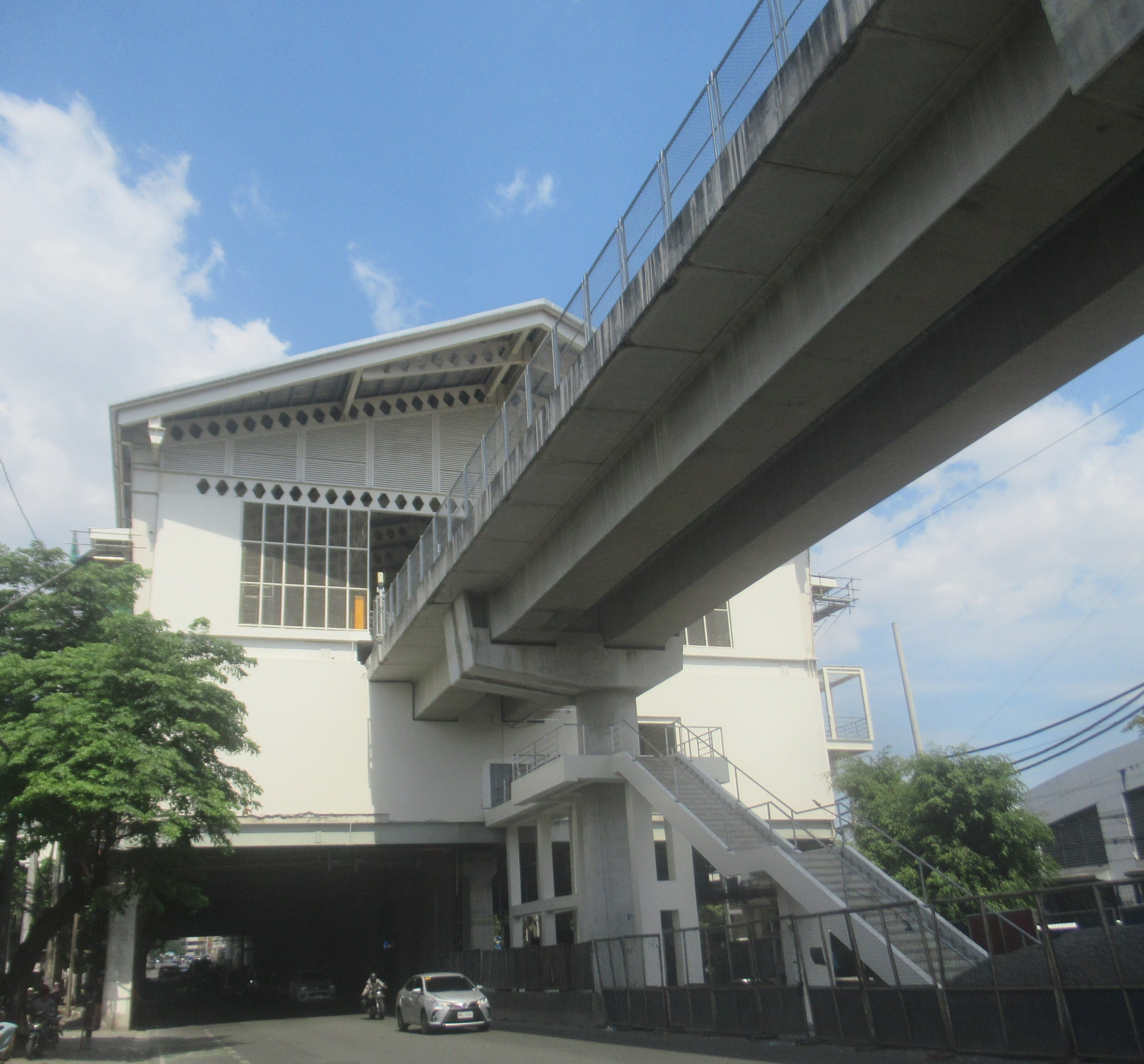
- Construction of Doña Carmen station in May 2026

General information
- Location: Commonwealth Avenue; Fairview, Quezon City; Philippines
- Coordinates: 14°42′18″N 121°04′42″E
- Owner: SMC-Mass Rail Transit 7 Incorporated
- Line: MRT Line 7
- Platforms: 2 side platforms
- Tracks: 2
- Connections: 6 7 49 Winston Street

Construction
- Structure type: Elevated
- Platform levels: 2; one concourse and one platform
- Accessible: yes

Other information
- Status: Under construction

History
- Opening: 2027

Services
Preceding station	Manila MRT	Following station
Manggahan towards North EDSA	MRT Line 7	Regalado Avenue towards San Jose Del Monte
Location

Doña Carmen station is an under-construction Metro Rail Transit (MRT) station located on the MRT Line 7 (MRT-7) system along Commonwealth Avenue in Fairview, Quezon City. It is located on the avenue's intersection with Winston Street and Don Jose Avenue, although its namesake street is located few blocks nearby. When completed, the station will be close to Doña Carmen Subdivision. The station can also provide access to the La Mesa Ecopark.

The station's construction is to be finished by 2026, while the target for full operation is in 2027.
