= Regalado Avenue station =

Train station in Quezon City, Philippines

ML09	Regalado Avenue
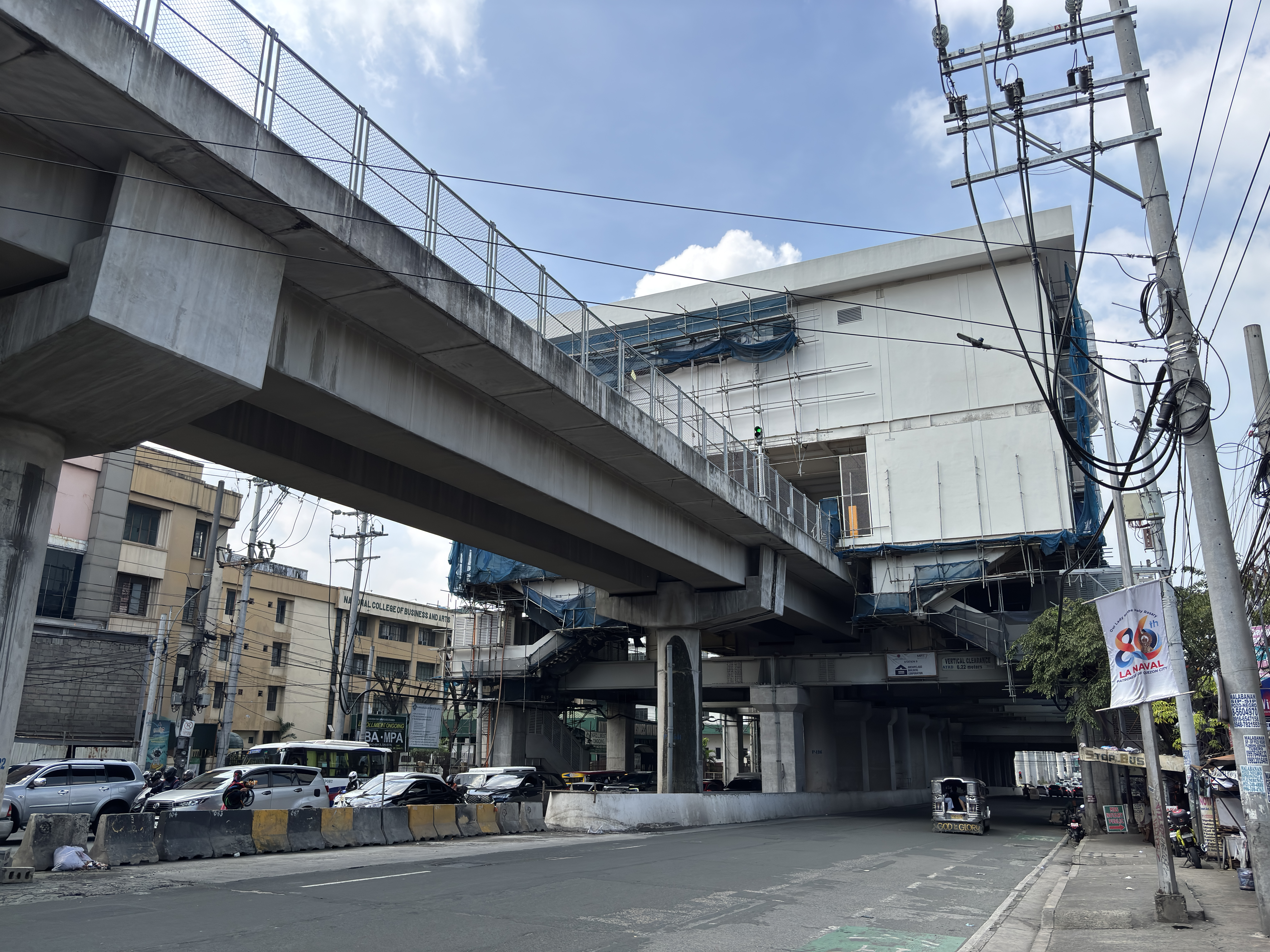
- Construction of Regalado Avenue station on November 2025

General information
- Other names: Regalado
- Location: Commonwealth Avenue; Fairview, Quezon City; Philippines
- Coordinates: 14°42′23″N 121°04′05″E
- Owner: SMC-Mass Rail Transit 7 Incorporated
- Line: MRT Line 7
- Platforms: 2 side platforms
- Tracks: 2
- Connections: 6 7 49 Fairview Center Mall

Construction
- Structure type: Elevated
- Platform levels: 3; one concourse, one platform, one unknown
- Accessible: yes

Other information
- Status: Under construction

History
- Opening: 2027

Services
Preceding station	Manila MRT	Following station
Doña Carmen towards North EDSA	MRT Line 7	Mindanao Avenue towards San Jose Del Monte
Location

Regalado Avenue station is an under-construction Metro Rail Transit (MRT) station located on the MRT Line 7 (MRT-7) system along Commonwealth Avenue in Fairview, Quezon City, Philippines. Named after the nearby Regalado Avenue, the station is nearby the Fairview Center Mall, National College of Business and Arts and the Far Eastern University - Nicanor Reyes Medical Foundation.

There is a pocket track alongside the revenue tracks that leads to Mindanao Avenue station.

== History ==
Construction of Regalado Avenue station began in July 2023 with the installation of the station's steel structure.
