= Batasan Hills National High School =

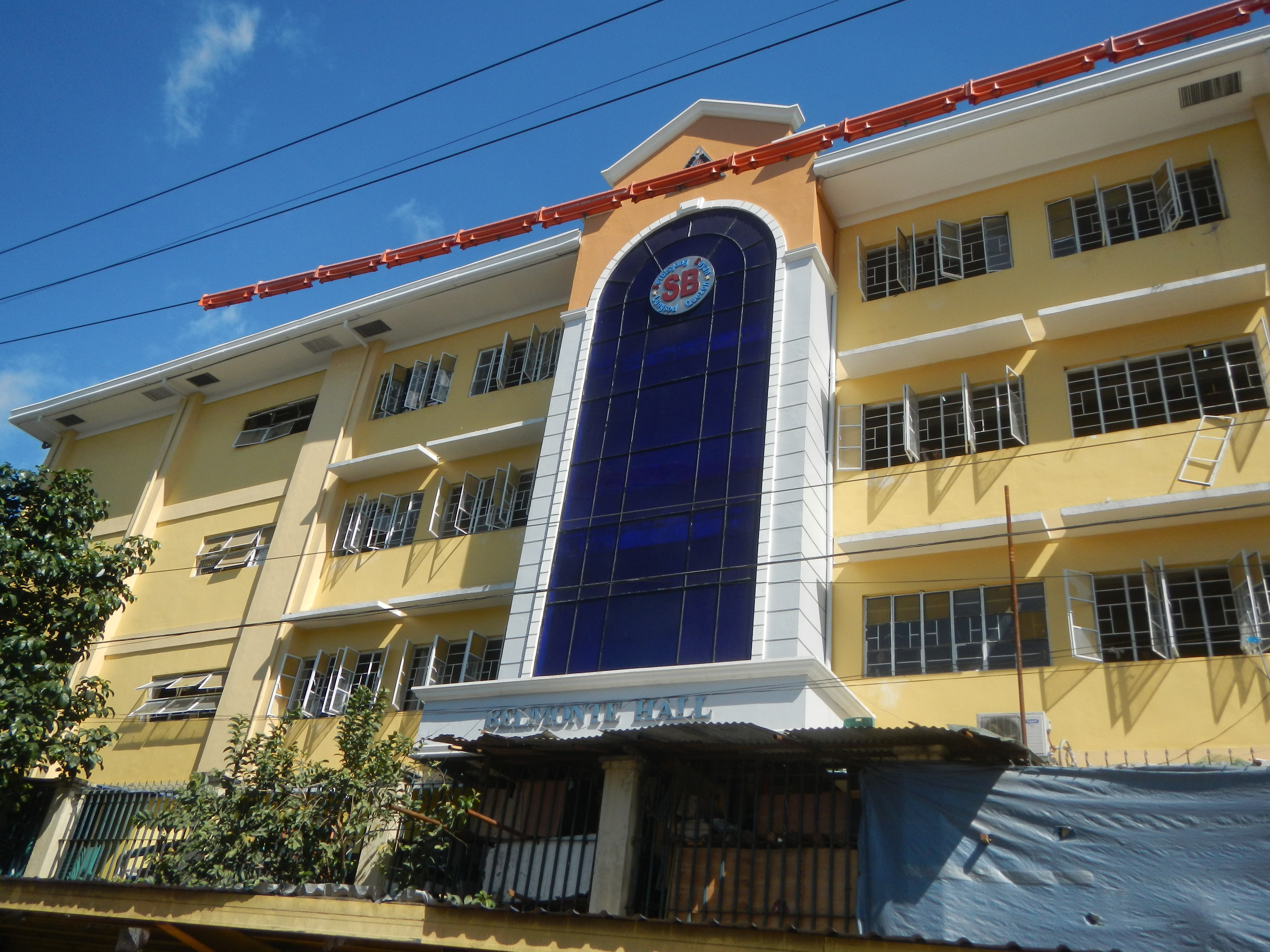

Location
- IBP Road; Batasan Hills; Metro Manila; Quezon City 1126; Philippines
- Coordinates: 14°41′21.02″N 121°5′42.98″E

Information
- Type: Public, National
- Established: April 22, 1996
- Status: Open
- Principal: Dr. Joseph G. Palisoc
- Grades: 7–12
- Enrollment: 19,107 as of August 18, 2022 (June 2018)
- Education system: K-12
- Language: Filipino; English
- Budget: ₱292.1 million (2024)
- Tuition: None

Batasan Hills National High School (BHNHS) is a public high school located in Batasan Hills, Quezon City, Philippines. It is the most populated public high school in the Philippines with nearly 16,000 students.

== History ==
BHNHS was established on April 22, 1996, as a newly legislated Public Secondary School through a House Bill Sponsored by former Quezon City District V Congressman Dante V. Liban. It was then enacted into a law as Republic Act No. 7987. On 1998, the school formally opened with only 20 teachers and 582 students coming from Bagong Silangan High School. Dr. Romulo B. Rocena became the first principal of the school. Republic Act No. 10716, an Act changing the name of BHNHS to Corazon C. Aquino National High School lapsed into law on December 10, 2015. However, the school does not bear that name and continues to be known as Batasan Hills National High School.
