= Iglesia ni Cristo chapel, Punta =

Iglesia ni Cristo Punta Locale
- Lokal ng Punta (Filipino)
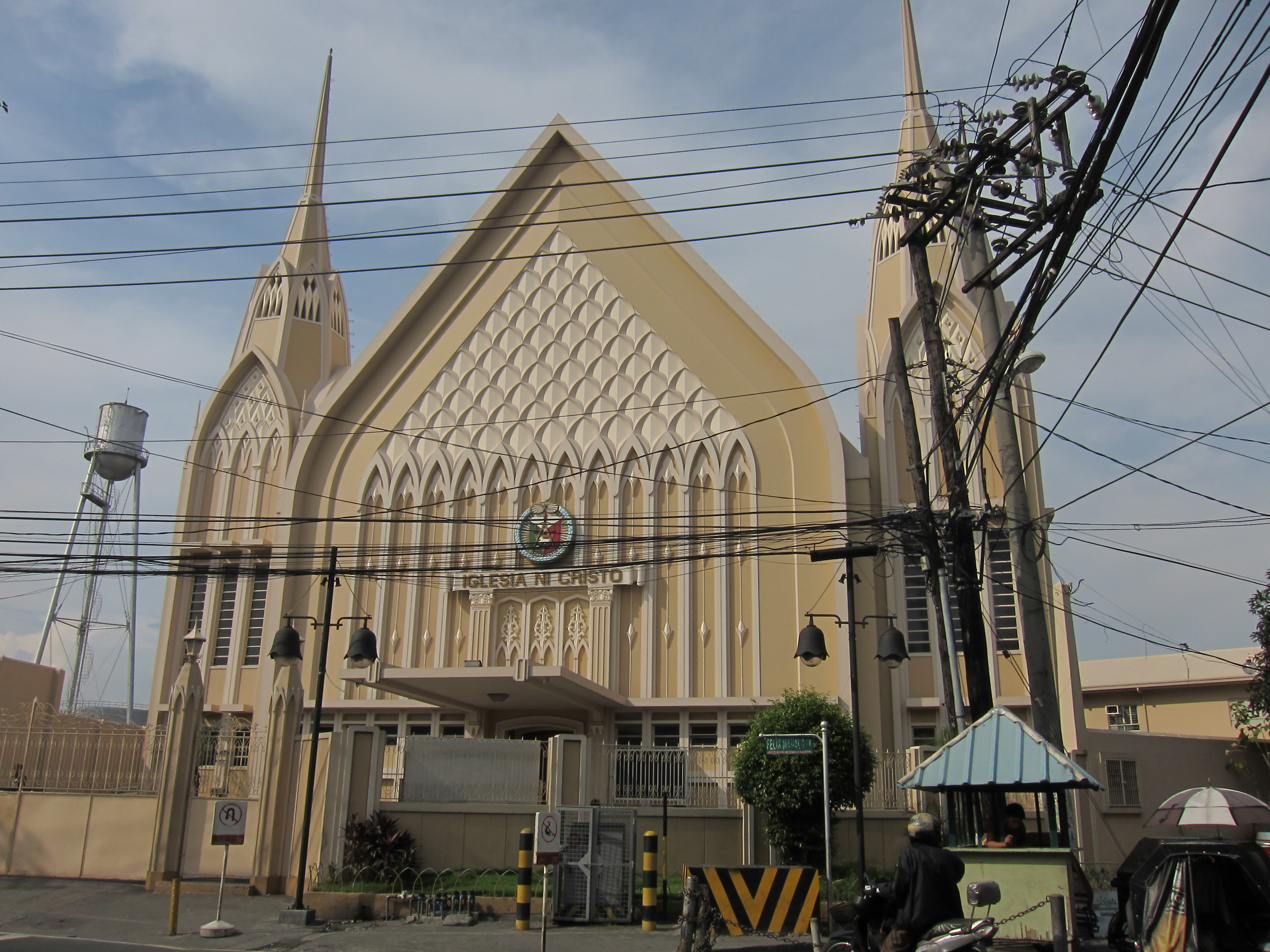
- Iglesia ni Cristo Punta Locale
- 14°35′17″N 121°00′57″E
- Location: 109. Felix Y. Manalo Street, Punta Santa Ana, Manila
- Country: Philippines
- Denomination: Iglesia ni Cristo

History
- Status: Locale Congregation

Architecture
- Functional status: active
- Architect(s): Carlos A. Santos-Viola and INC Construction and Engineering Department
- Completed: July 27, 1989; 36 years ago

Specifications
- Capacity: 1200

Administration
- District: Maynila

The Iglesia Ni Cristo Locale of Punta (Filipino: Lokal ng Punta) is a chapel of the Philippine-based Christian religion, the Iglesia ni Cristo. Located at Punta, Santa Ana, Manila, it was completed on 1989 in commemoration of the 75th anniversary of the church to replace the old chapel (now a museum) meters away from the current chapel, the congregation was the first locale of the church established in 1914. It was designed by architect, Carlos A. Santos-Viola in collaboration with the Iglesia ni Cristo Construction and Engineering Department.

== See also ==
- Iglesia ni Cristo Museum (Santa Ana, Manila)
