= Iglesia ni Cristo chapel, Washington, D.C. =

Iglesia ni Cristo chapel Washington D.C.
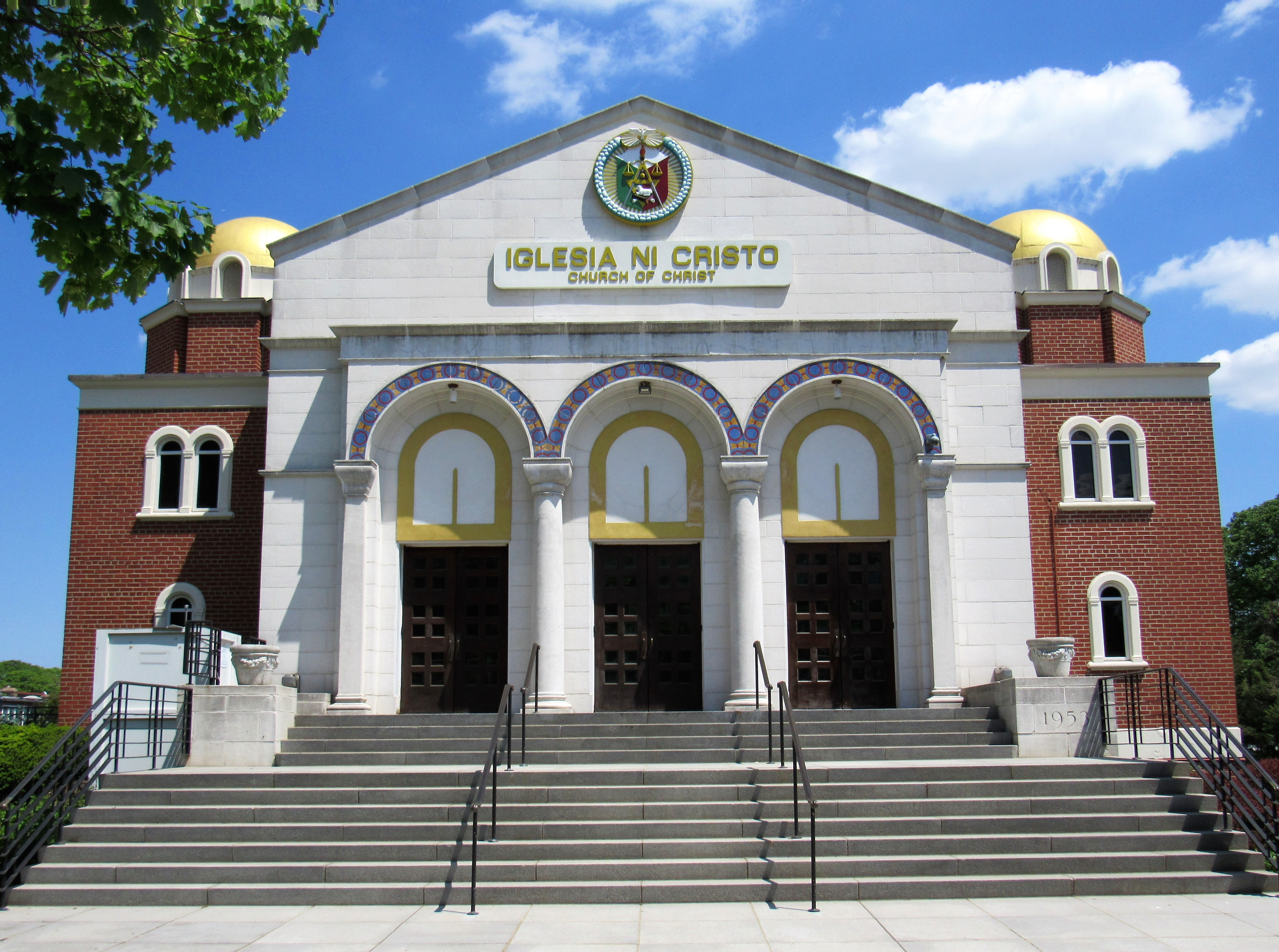
- The house of worship in 2014
- Iglesia ni Cristo chapel Washington D.C.
- 38.941248°N 77.035883°W
- Location: 16th Street, Washington, D.C.
- Country: United States
- Denomination: Iglesia ni Cristo
- Previous denomination: Greek Orthodox Church

History
- Former name(s): Saints Constantine and Helen Church
- Status: kapilya (chapel)

Architecture
- Functional status: active

Administration
- District: Washington D.C

The Iglesia ni Cristo chapel in Washington D.C. in the United States is located along 16th Street. It used to be a place of worship and school of the Saints Constantine and Helen Greek Orthodox Church. The Iglesia ni Cristo through the Allison James Estates & Homes purchased the chapel building from Summit Commercial which represents the Greek Orthodox church for $9.2 million in November 2012. It was renovated by the Iglesia as a house of worship for its own adherents.

The complex composed with two building. The former Orthodox church building has one story and a basement with a land area measuring 14,800 square feet (1,370 m^{2}) is located within a 1.82 hectares (196,000 sq ft; 18,200 m^{2}) parcel of land. The former school building within the complex is three stories high and measures 16,370 square feet (1,521 m^{2}).
