= Iglesia ni Cristo Museum (Santa Ana, Manila) =

Iglesia ni Cristo museum in Manila, Philippines

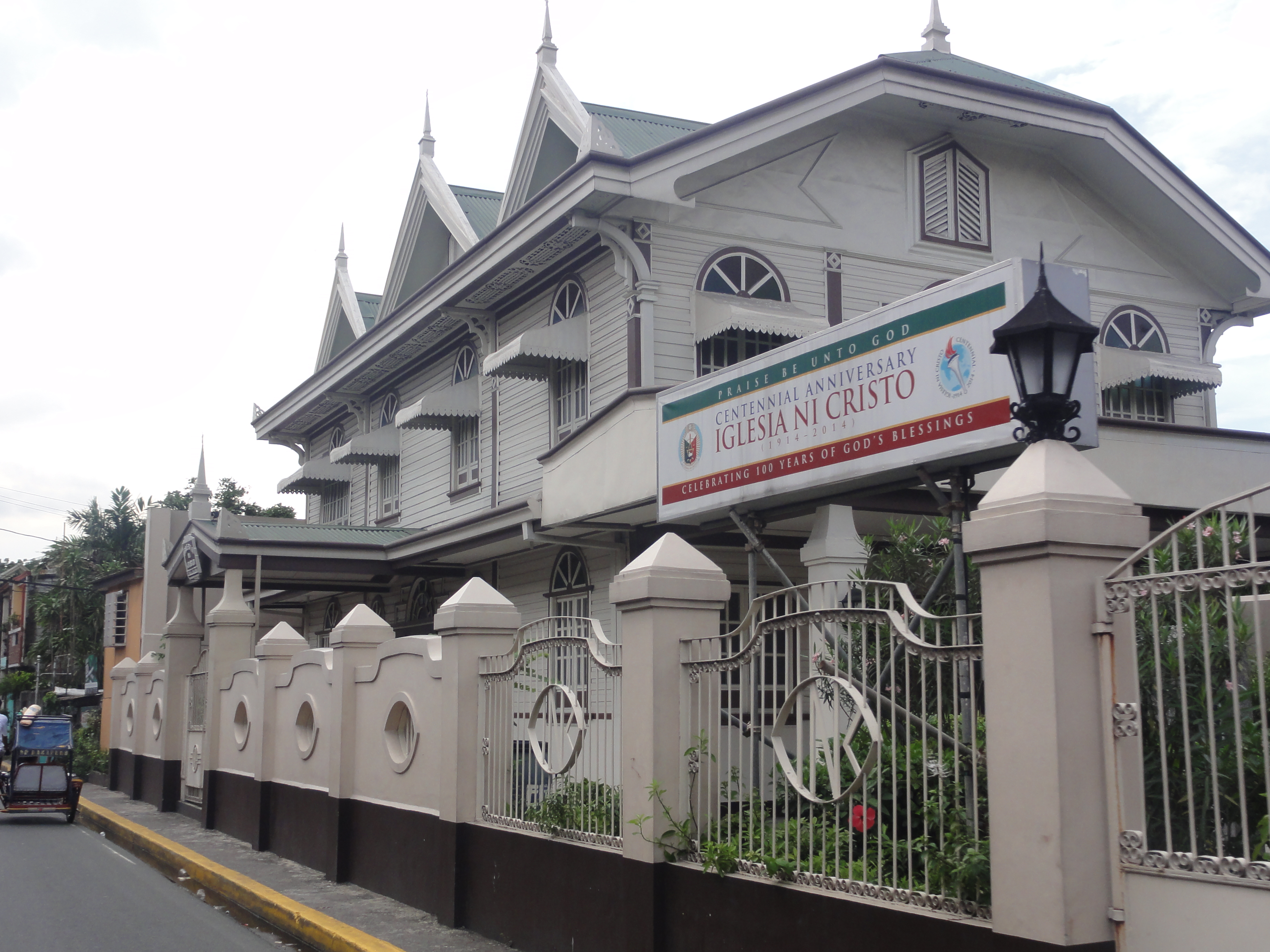
- The Iglesia ni Cristo Museum, 2014
- Iglesia ni Cristo Museum
- 14°35′15″N 121°01′00″E
- Location: Punta, Santa Ana, Manila
- Country: Philippines
- Denomination: Iglesia ni Cristo

History
- Status: kapilya (chapel) before conversion to museum
- Dedicated: 1937

Architecture
- Functional status: museum

Administration
- District: Maynila

The Iglesia ni Cristo Museum is a museum in Punta, Santa Ana, Manila. The museum building was originally a place of worship and was the first local congregation of the Iglesia ni Cristo, where founder Felix Manalo first preached about the Iglesia in 1914. The same church now runs the museum.

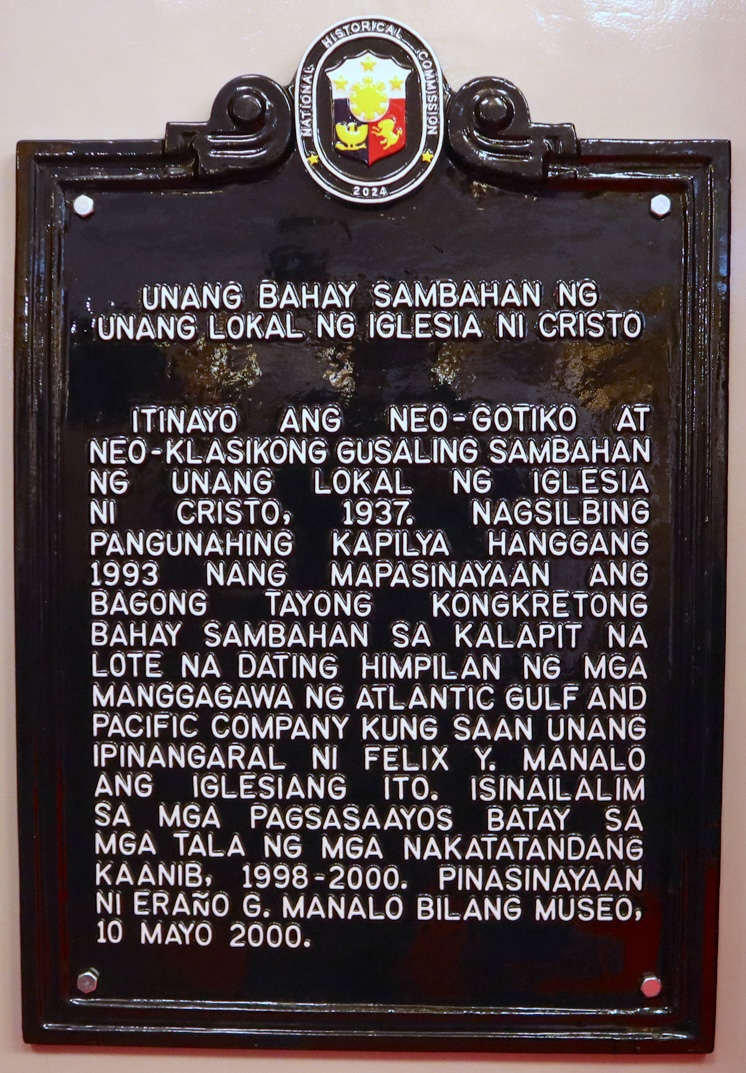
National historical marker installed in 2025
