= Batasan Hills =

Barangay in Quezon City, Metro Manila, Philippines

- Barangay
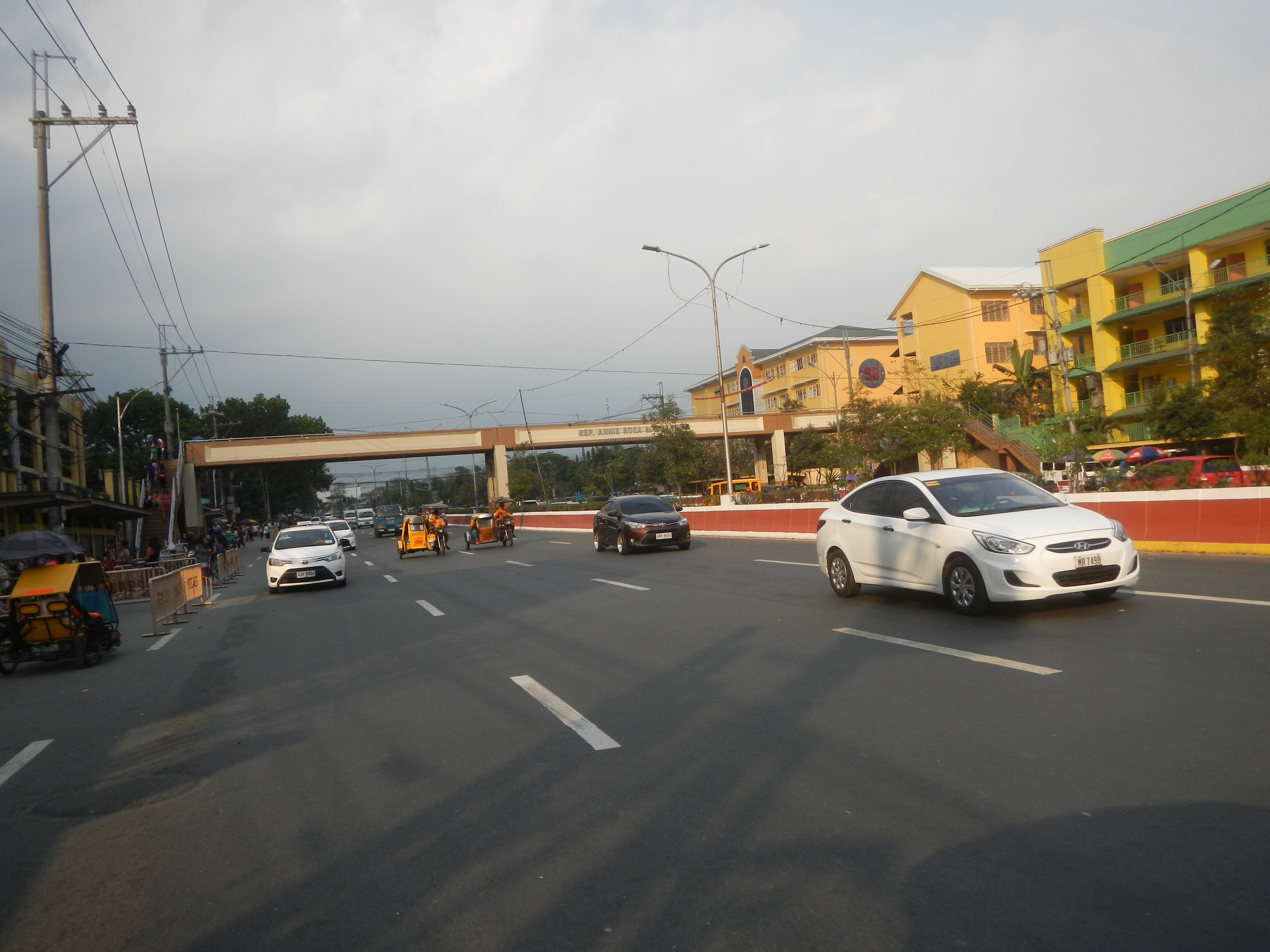
- Batasan Road

- Seal
- Nicknames: Batasan; Constitution Hills
- Interactive map of Batasan Hills
- Location of Batasan Hills within Metro Manila
- Coordinates: 14°41′4″N 121°5′51″E
- Country: Philippines
- Region: National Capital Region
- City: Quezon City
- District: 2nd District
- Established: February 25, 1983

Government
  - Type: Barangay
  - Barangay Captain: Jojo Abad

Population (?)
  - Total: 166,572
- Time zone: UTC+8 (PST)
- Postal Code: 1126
- Area code: 2

Batasan Hills is a barangay of Quezon City, Philippines. The barangay was originally planned as the National Government Center of the Philippines. The Batasang Pambansa Complex, which sits atop the Constitution Hill, is the legislative session hall of the House of Representatives of the Philippines. The Sandiganbayan, a special appellate court, is also located here.

The barangay borders the barangays of Commonwealth and Bagong Silangan to the north, Barangay Holy Spirit to the west, Barangay Matandang Balara to the south, and the municipality of San Mateo, Rizal to the east.

== Background ==
Batasan Hills traces its roots from the adjacent barangay Matandang Balara, formerly known as Balara and a former barrio of Marikina until it became part of Quezon City in 1949. In 1983, it was separated and constituted into a new barangay through the initiative of Ben Morales (President of Filinvest 1 Homeowners Association), Melvin Morallos (Chairman of Tanggol Karapatan Dist.II/August Twenty One Movement) and Manolo Taroy (Congressional Staff of Congressman José M. Alberto of Catanduanes, who sponsored the bill for the creation of Barangay Batasan Hills) by virtue of Batas Pambansa Blg. 343.

A plebiscite was conducted and ratified by the majority of the votes cast by the residents. In 1986, after the People Power Revolution and 3 years after the approval of Batas Pambansa Blg. 343, the first set of barangay officials were appointed by President Corazon C. Aquino through the (then) Secretary of Interior and Local Government Aquilino Pimentel. Manuel D. Laxina was the first appointed Barangay Chairman, along with six Barangay Kagawads.

The barangay was envisioned to be the new home of the National Government Center, an area housing the three branches of the Philippine government (legislative, executive and judicial), as Quezon City was declared the capital of the Philippines in 1948. This government center in Quezon City was originally planned to be at what is now Quezon Memorial Circle, before it was moved north to the area of what is now Batasan Hills. Even as the Batasang Pambansa Complex was being completed, the capital of the country was transferred back to Manila in 1976. Before its creation as a barangay, the area was called "Constitution Hill", referring to the hilly area on where the government center was supposed to rise.

Today, most of Batasan Hills is residential. Although it has one of the largest urban poor populations in the country, it is also home to middle and upper class real estate properties like Filinvest 1 and 2, Northview 1 and 2, and Treviso, which were developed by real estate firm Filinvest Land. Other middle and upper class real estate properties include Vista Real Executive Village and Vista Real Classica Subdivision.

== Government ==
The barangay is part of the Second Legislative district of Quezon City. The current barangay captain is John "Jojo" M. Abad. It is home to several important National Government institutions including the House of Representatives of the Philippines at the Batasang Pambansa Complex, the Sandiganbayan, and the Commission on Audit.

== Buildings and structures ==
Notable buildings and structures within the barangay include the Batasang Pambansa Complex, which houses the House of Representatives, and the Sandiganbayan Centennial Building, home of the Sandiganbayan, which is one of the appellate courts of the Philippine judiciary. Other government agencies in the area include the headquarters of the Civil Service Commission, the Commission on Audit, and the Department of Social Welfare and Development.

Also located within the barangay is Ever Gotesco Commonwealth and St. Peter's Parish along Commonwealth Avenue.

=== Residential Subdivisions/Villages ===
The barangay is mostly residential with a number of subdivisions and villages, which include:

- Sugartowne Subdivision
- Filinvest 1 Subdivision
- Filinvest 2 Subdivision
- Filinvest Heights
- Luzviminda Village
- Ciudad Regina
- Doña Pilar Subdivision
- Northview 1 Subdivision
- Northview 2 Subdivision
- Sugartowne Housing Project
- Serra Monte Villas
- Treviso
- Spring Country Subdivision
- Capitol Ridge Executive Subdivision
- New Capitol Estates 1
- New Capitol Estates 2
- Sunnyside Heights Subdivision
- Nelson Ville I
- Villa Amor Uno
- Vista Real Executive Village
- Vista Real Classica Subdivision
- Violago Homes
- Woodcrest Homes
- Garland Subdivision
- Señorita Subdivision
- Ohana Homes 2

=== Schools ===
There are schools located in the barangay namely:

- Imelda Operio's Learning School
- Advanced Seminary Of Leadership (JCITA-ASOL)
- Foothills Christian School
- Anima Christi Academy
- Young Scholars Academy
- Caroline Learning Center
- PICA-Peacemaker International Christian Academy
- Batasan Hills National High School
- Benz-On School
- Pres. Corazon C. Aquino Elementary School
- San Diego Elementary School
- Diliman Preparatory School
- Capitol Hills Christian School
- Our Lady of Mercy School
- Our Lord Saviour Academy
- Mary the Queen College
- Mary the Queen Academy English-Chinese School
- Quezon City Polytechnic University-Batasan Campus
- Sto. Niño Institute of Science and Technology - Talanay Branch
- Fairhope Academy
- Paul Christian Academy [Elementary School]
- Kumdang Jungang Christian School Inc.
- Royal Kids Academy of Arts

=== Churches ===
- St. Peter's Parish
- San Antonio De Padua Parish
- Jesus Is Lord Church- Batasan
- Members Church of God International (Ang Dating Daan)
- Capitol Hills Christian Church
- Christ Commission Fellowship - Commonwealth
- Christ to the Philippines-Batasan Hills Chapter (CTTP)
- Christ the King Parish
- Christ Life Prayer Ministry International
- Protestant Parishes
- The Church of Jesus Christ of Latter-day Saints (LDS church)
- Batasan Hills International Baptist Church
- Jesus Christ Is The Answer Church International
- Jesus Christ Saves Global Outreach - Batasan Family
- Pentecostal Missionary Church of Christ
- Manila Oh Jung Church
- Mt. Zion Baptist Church
- Bastion Of Truth Reformed Church
- The Living God (Full Gospel Christian Church)
- Good News Family Worship Center
- Park Baptist Church and Missions
- Presentation of our Lord Parish (located in Filinvest 1)
- Iglesia Ni Cristo Locale Congregation of Batasan Hills
- ACTS-Evangelism Assemblies of the Lord Jesus Christ Phils. Inc. (Apostolic Church)

==== Sub-Parishes ====
- Mary the Queen Sub-Parish
- Santo Nino Sub-Parish (Villa Amor Uno subdivision)
- Our Lady of Assumption
- Banal na Puso
- Our Lady of Fatima

== Transportation ==
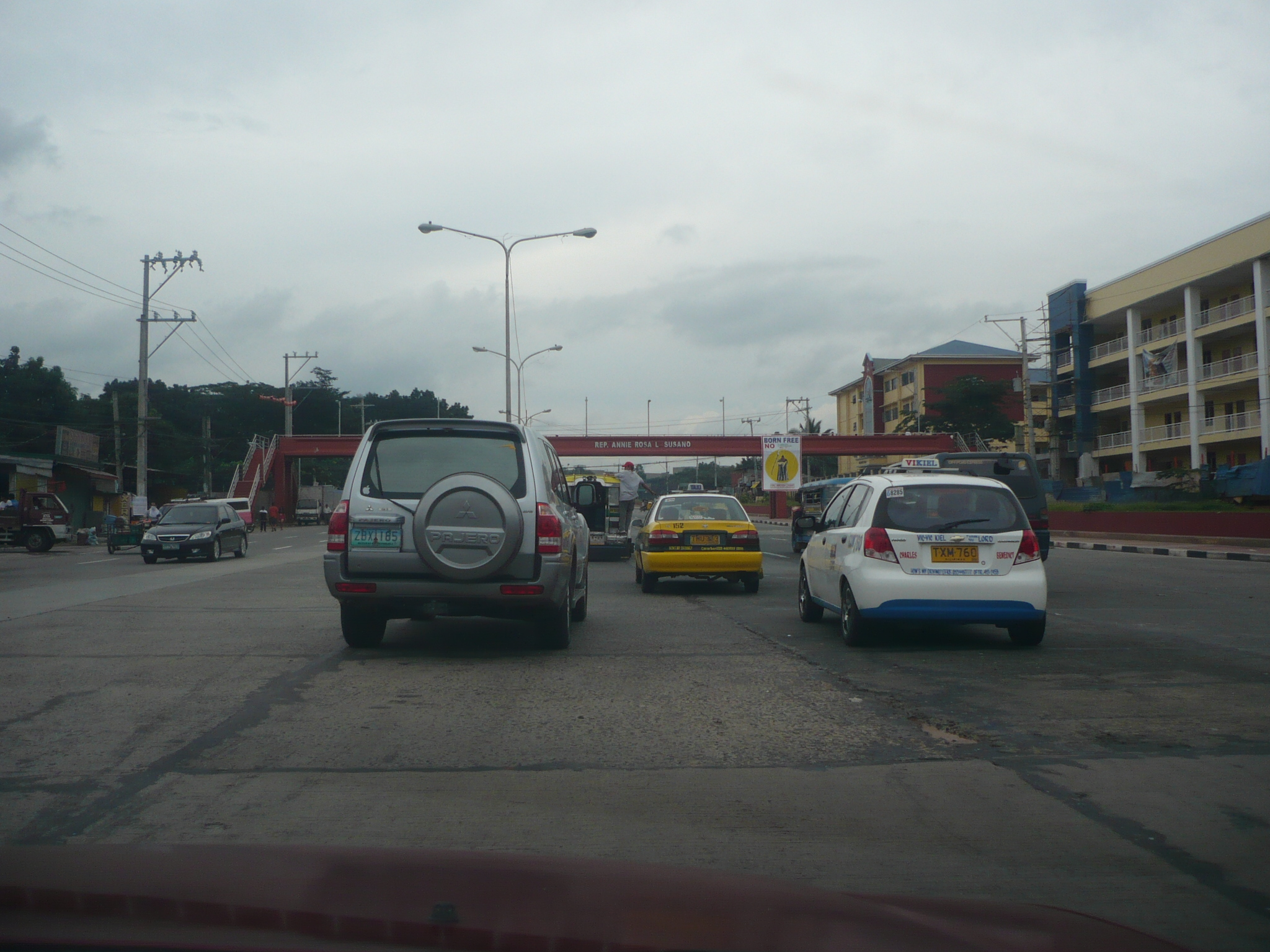
Batasan Road, one of the major roads of Batasan Hills.

There are three major roads in Batasan Hills: Commonwealth Avenue (Radial Road 7/N170), Batasan (IBP) Road and the Batasan-San Mateo Road. In the future, Batasan will be served by the Batasan Station of MRT Line 7 located a few meters south of the junction of Commonwealth Avenue and IBP Road near the Sandiganbayan Centennial Building.

Tricycles are a popular form of transportation that ply the neighborhoods of Batasan Hills. The Batasan Tricycle Terminal is located near the Sandiganbayan. It is a popular pick-up/drop-off site for passengers of PUV and UV Express. Tricycle routes serves Filinvest, Talanay, Sitio Taniman and also nearby barangays such as Bagong Silangan and Payatas.

== Incidents ==
- Batasang Pambansa bombing. On November 13, 2007, an explosion occurred on South Wing of the Batasan Complex killing four people including Congressman Wahab Akbar of Basilan and injuring six more including Representatives Luzviminda Ilagan of GABRIELA and Pryde Henry Teves of Negros Oriental.
