= Iglesia ni Cristo chapel, Capitol =

Iglesia ni Cristo chapel in Quezon City, Philippines

Iglesia ni Cristo Capitol Locale
- Lokal ng Capitol (Filipino)
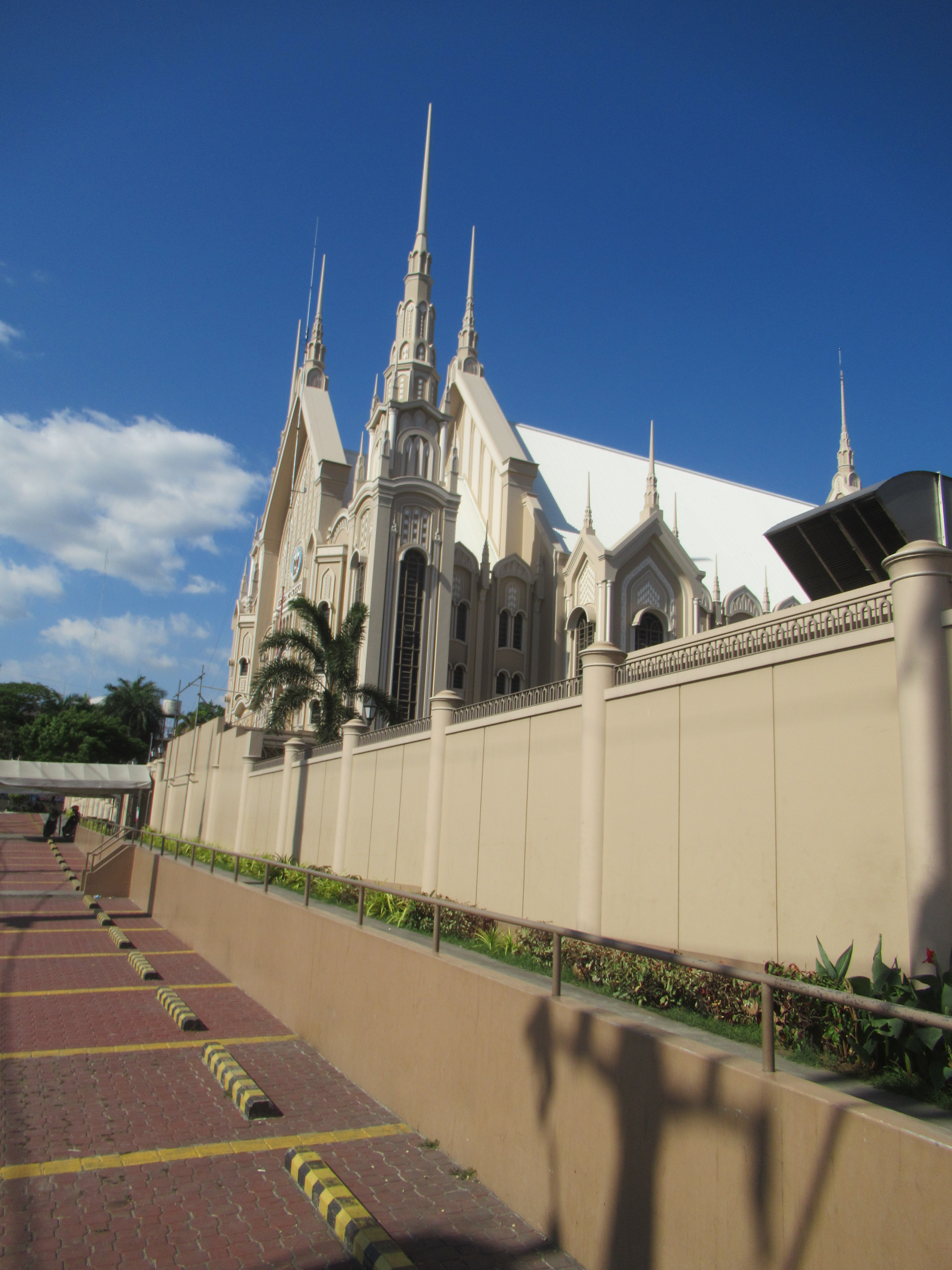
- Locale Congregation of Capitol, Located at Commonwealth Avenue, Quezon City
- Iglesia ni Cristo Capitol Locale
- 14°41′48″N 121°05′17″E
- Location: Barangay Commonwealth, Quezon City, Metro Manila
- Country: Philippines
- Denomination: Iglesia ni Cristo

History
- Status: Locale Congregation

Architecture
- Functional status: active
- Architect(s): Iglesia ni Cristo Construction and Engineering Department
- Architectural type: Neo Gothic
- Years built: 3
- Completed: July 19, 2014; 11 years ago
- Construction cost: ₱300,000,000 ($6,250,000)

Specifications
- Capacity: 3,500

Administration
- District: Quezon City

The Iglesia Ni Cristo Locale of Capitol (Filipino: Lokal ng Capitol) is a chapel of the Philippine-based church, the Iglesia ni Cristo. Located along Commonwealth Avenue in Quezon City, it was completed on July 19, 2014, and is one of the largest chapels ever built by the church, with the capacity of 3000. Also in the compound, where the District Office of the Ecclesiastical District of Quezon City located.

Built on the 7,500 square lot acquired by the church from National Housing Authority (Philippines), the chapel was erected 43 years after the establishment of locale congregation of Capitol in 1971, which has also having a former chapel nearby which seats 200 worshippers at a time. It was designed to hold around 3,000 worshippers, accommodating some 1,300 in the main hall plus 200 in choir loft and 1,200 in its three-level balcony which designed for accommodating worshippers. The compound features, a two-story multi-level parking building which is the first in the INC church architecture.

On July 19, 2014, a week before the centennial celebrations of the church, the edifice was dedicated by Brother Eduardo V. Manalo which was coincided with the church's mid-year thanksgiving.

== Gallery ==
View of chapel in 2016

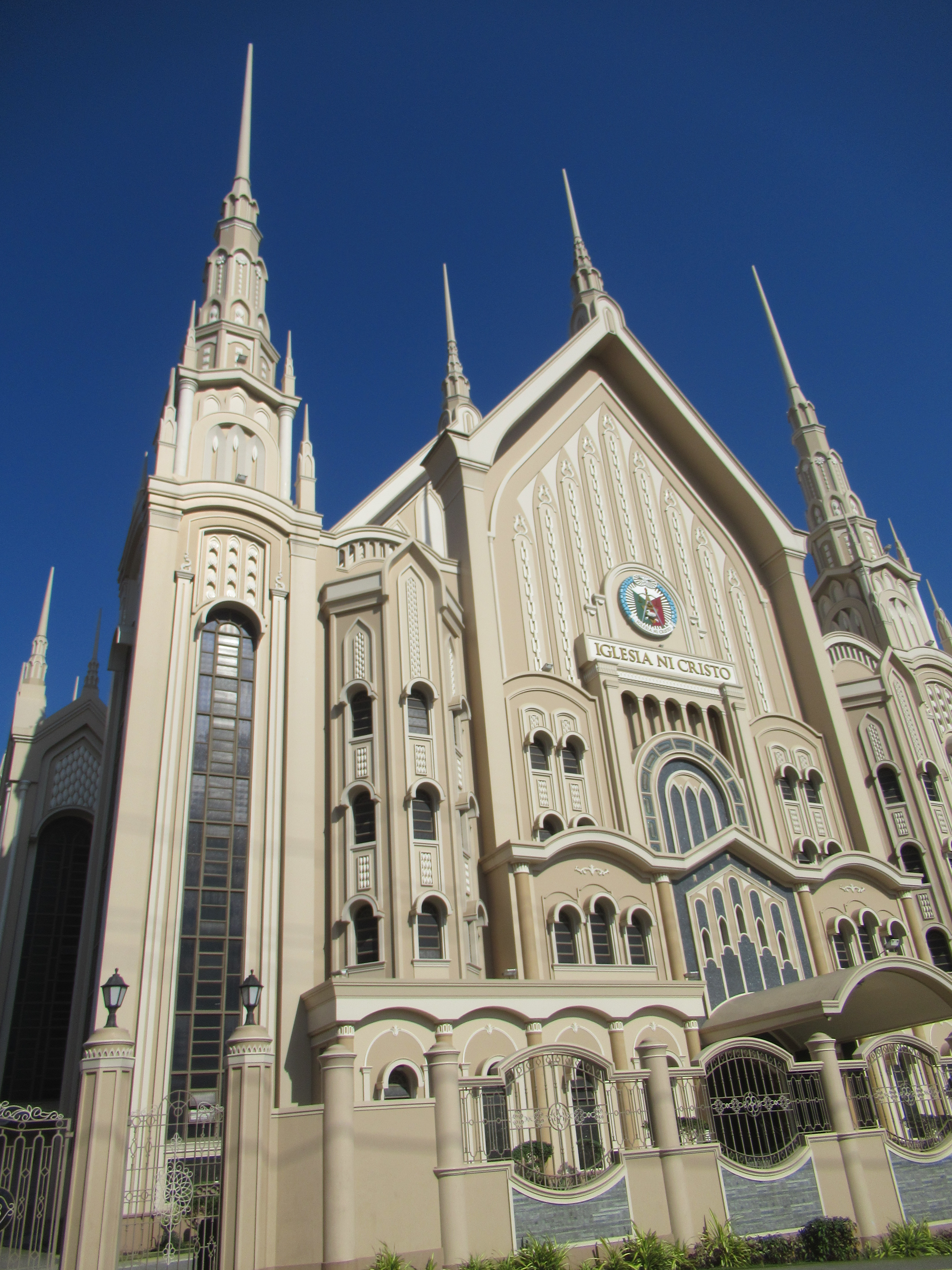
Facade in 2023
