= Commonwealth Elementary School =

Public elementary school in Quezon City, Philippines

Coordinates: 14°41′51″N 121°05′18″E

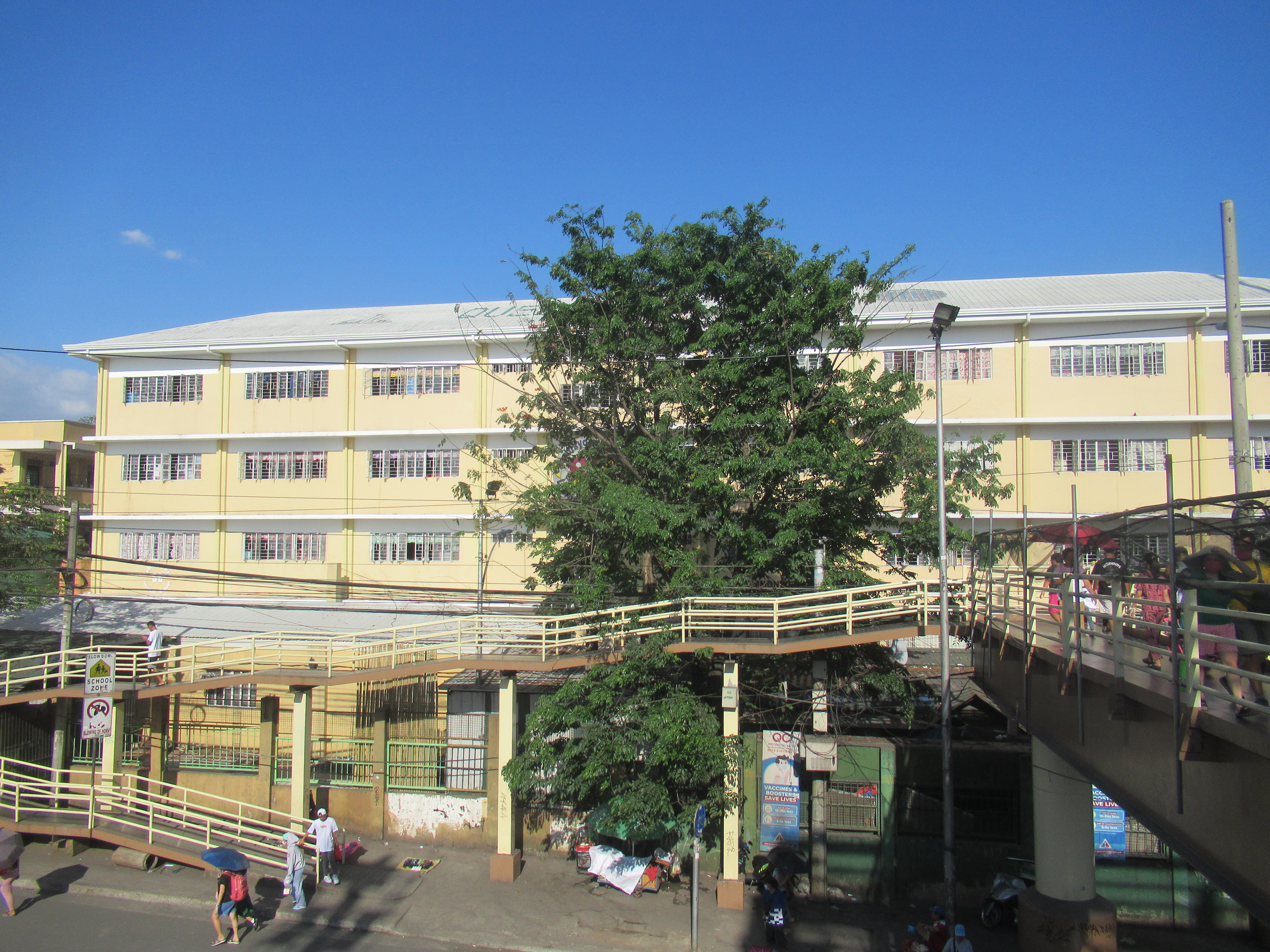
- Quezon City; Philippines

Information
- Type: Grade school
- Established: 1973
- Founder: Ma. Deyro-Galang

Commonwealth Elementary School, located in Quezon City, Philippines, is a grade school with the largest student enrolment in the city with approximately 13,000 students in 2007. The school is one of the biggest elementary schools in the country, and is one of the world's most populous grade schools.
