= Batasan Road =

Road in Quezon City, Philippines

Coordinates: 14°41′48″N 121°5′39″E

- Constitution Hill Road; Litex Road
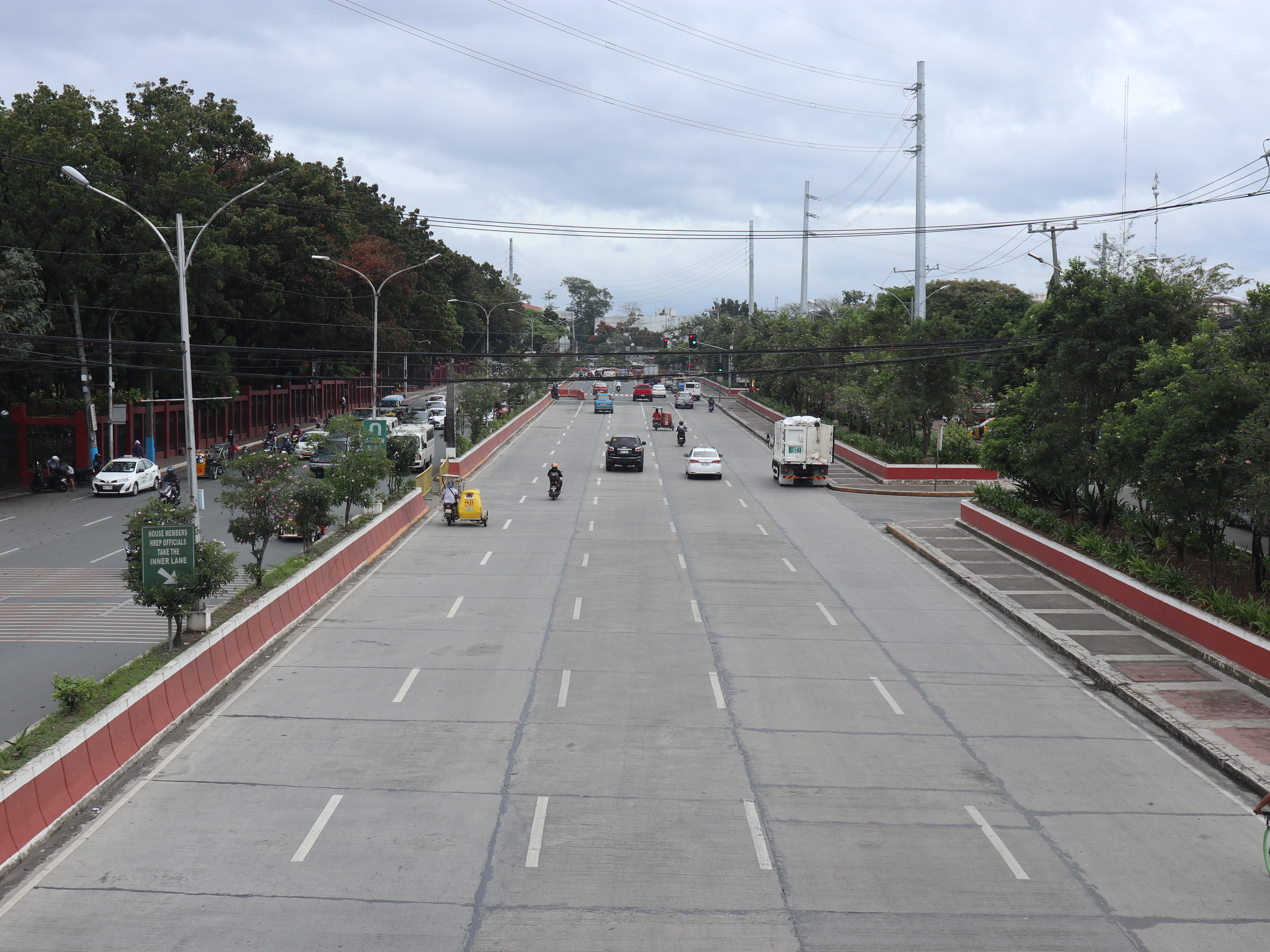
- Batasan Road near the Batasang Pambansa Complex
- Interactive map of Batasan Road
- Former name: IBP Road
- Maintained by: Department of Public Works and Highways (DPWH) – Quezon City 1st District Engineering Office
- Length: 2.8 km (1.7 mi); Approximate length measured via Google Maps
- Location: Quezon City
- North end: N170 (Commonwealth Avenue) in Commonwealth
- South end: N170 (Commonwealth Avenue) in Batasan Hills

Batasan Road (formerly and still known as IBP Road) is a six-to-ten-lane circumferential highway in the barangays of Batasan Hills, Bagong Silangan, Payatas, and Commonwealth, all in Quezon City, Philippines. The road serves as a route towards the Batasang Pambansa Complex, where the House of Representatives of the Philippines is located.

== Route description ==
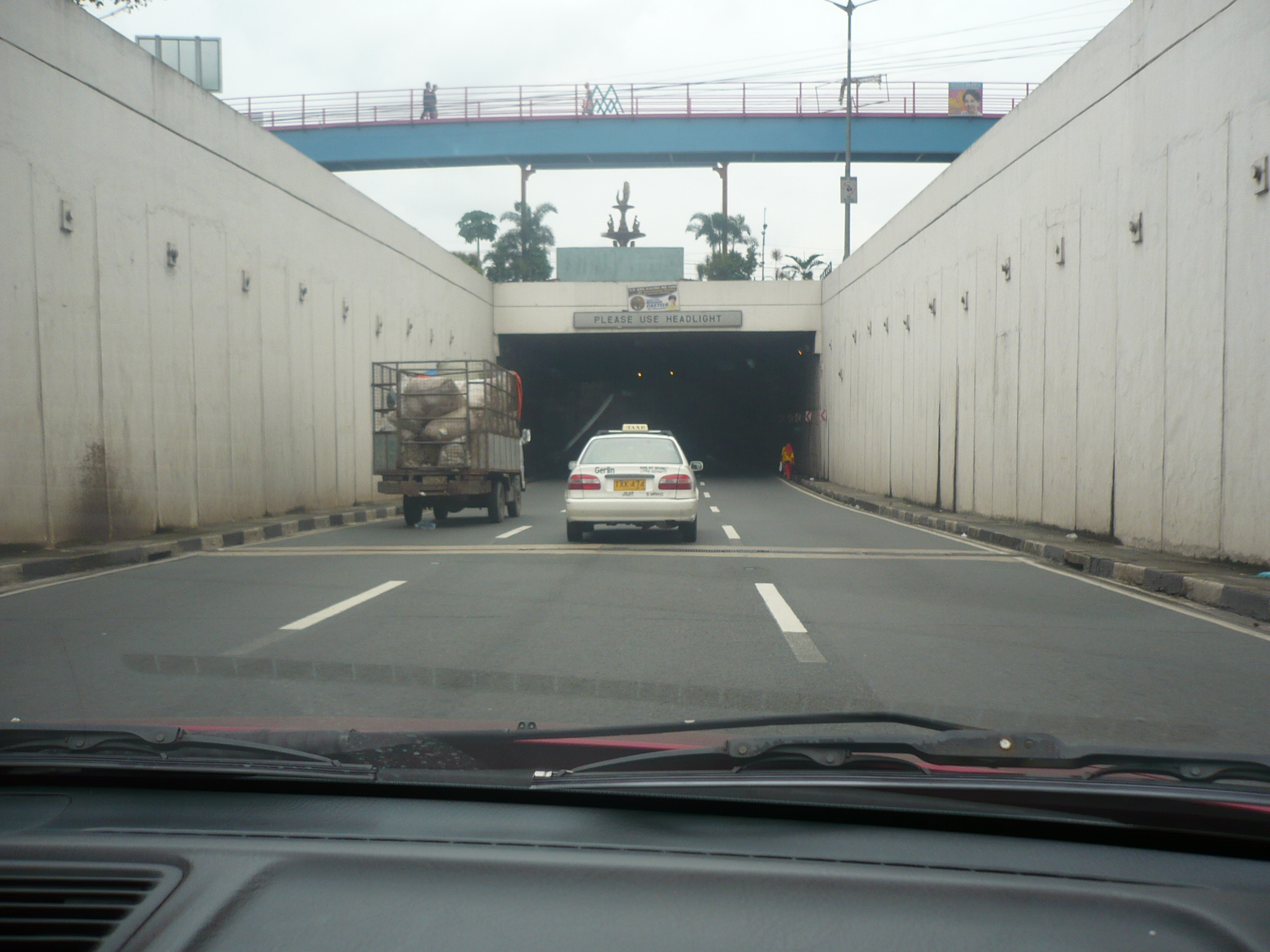
Batasan Tunnel

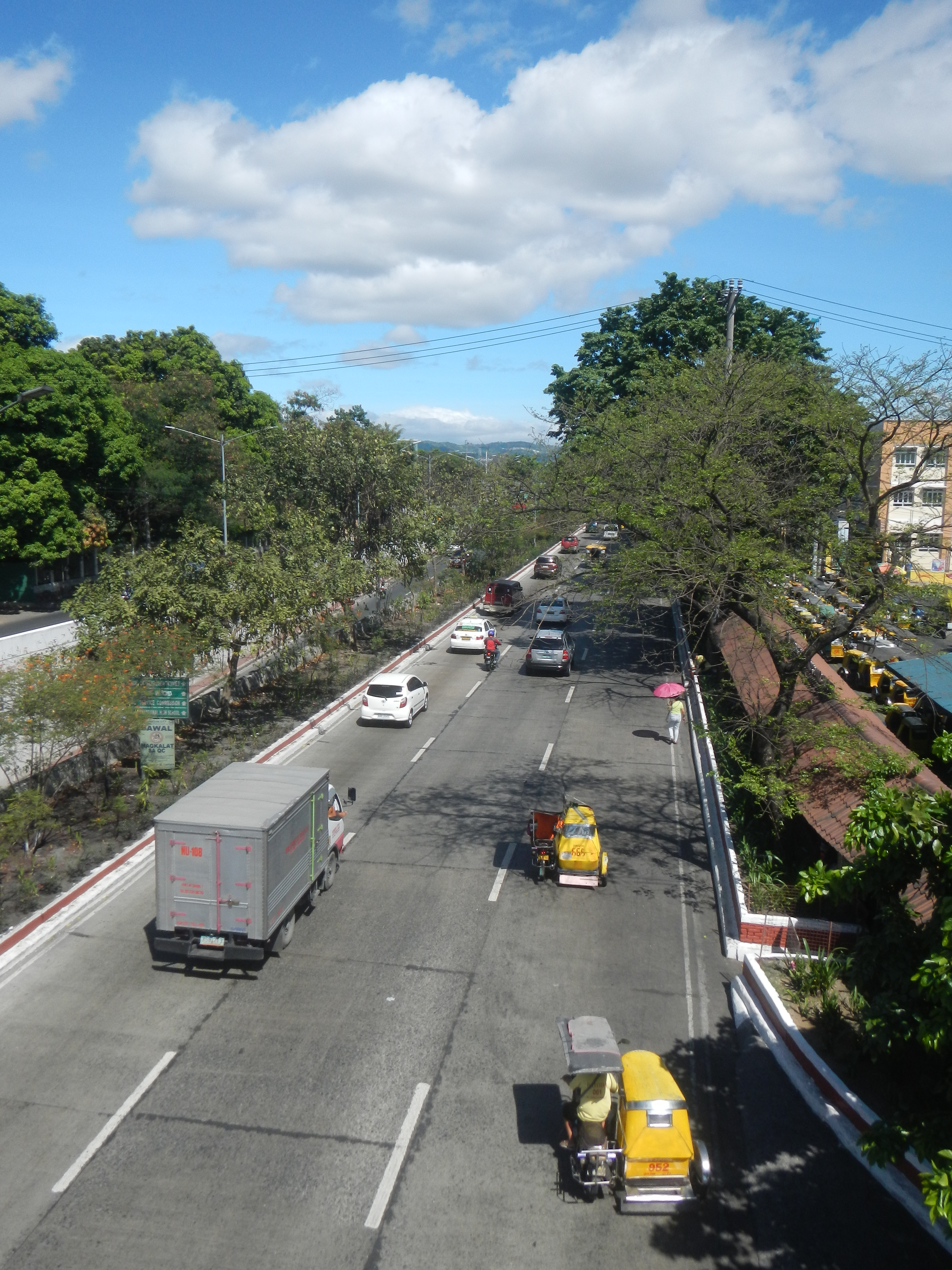
Batasan Road near Sandiganbayan

The road begins at the intersection with Commonwealth Avenue near the Sandiganbayan and the Batasan Tricycle Operators and Drivers Association (BATODA) terminal as a 6-lane highway. A tunnel named the Batasan Tunnel, completed in 2001, is used by southbound motorists turning left towards Commonwealth Avenue. The road then continues towards the intersection with the Filinvest 1 Road, which connects the road towards the Filinvest 1 Subdivision. The road continues as a ten-lane highway, which was completed in 2008, passing towards the Batasan Hills National High School and the South Gate of the Batasang Pambansa, which was used as an entrance for visitors until the 2007 Batasang Pambansa bombing, where only House Members can use the entrance. At the intersection with the Batasan–San Mateo Road, the road returns into a 6-lane highway and passes towards the Civil Service Commission, the Department of Social Welfare and Development, and the North Gate of the Batasang Pambansa which is now used as an entrance for the media, visitors, and House employees. The road then passes through homes located along the Payatas area, and after the intersection with Payatas Road (Manila Gravel Pit Road), the road ends in the Litex area and rejoins with Commonwealth Avenue. Ramps to the Southeast Metro Manila Expressway that will bring motorists to Rizal will also terminate there.

== Buildings and structures ==
The road has numerous major government establishments like the Batasang Pambansa Complex, where the House of Representatives is located, Sandiganbayan, Commission on Audit, Department of Social Welfare and Development, and the House and Senate Electoral Tribunals. There are other major establishments located within the whole stretch of the avenue, like the Batasan Hills Super Health Center, which serves the five barangays of Batasan Hills, Commonwealth, Payatas, Holy Spirit and Bagong Silangan is located within the avenue. Police Station 6 of the Quezon City Police Department is located adjacent to the South Entrance of the Batasang Pambansa Complex. Most of the avenue is surrounded by homes which are cramped and small, but there are some residential subdivisions along the area. The Batasan Hills National High School is also located on the avenue, and the Batasan Tricycle Operators and Drivers Association (BATODA) has its main terminal adjacent to the Sandiganbayan.
