= Batasang Pambansa Complex =

Headquarters of the House of Representatives of the Philippines

- The east front of the main building

- Location within Metro Manila Location within Luzon Location within Philippines

General information
- Location: Quezon City, Philippines
- Coordinates: 14°41′36″N 121°5′40″E
- Completed: 1978; 48 years ago

Design and construction
- Architect: Felipe M. Mendoza

Other information
- Parking: 300

The Batasang Pambansa Complex, or simply the Batasan (lit. 'legislature'), is the seat of the House of Representatives of the Philippines. It is located along the Batasan Road in Batasan Hills, Quezon City.

The complex was initially the home of the Batasang Pambansa, the former legislature of the Philippines which was established as an interim assembly in 1978 and finally as an official body in 1984. Under the 1973 Constitution, it replaced the bicameral Congress of the Philippines established under the 1935 Constitution.

When the bicameral Congress was restored in 1987, the complex was set aside as the home of the House of Representatives. The main building of the complex is still often referred to as the Batasang Pambansa.

The Senate, the upper house of Congress, does not meet in the Batasan, but in the GSIS Building located at Jose W. Diokno Boulevard in Pasay.

== History ==
=== Construction ===
Following the naming of Quezon City as the new capital city of the Philippines in 1948, a cornerstone for a Capitol building was laid on Constitution Hill, now Batasan Hills, in Quezon City on October 22, 1949. Originally reserved for the Philippine Military Academy as per the 1941 Frost Plan, the location was part of a larger National Government Center, which was intended to house the three branches of the Philippine government–legislative, executive, and judicial. In 1956, architect Federico S. Ilustre laid out the master plan for the location, which was set aside to be the new home of the Congress (made up of the Senate and the House of Representatives). Ilustre had also designed the buildings for the new legislative center. Public reception to the building's design was lukewarm, so a newer design by the National Planning Commission under architect Anselmo Alquinto replaced the Ilustre-designed one. By 1963, however, only the concrete foundations and steel frame were laid out. Ultimately, due to lack of funding, the Capitol was never completed. The uncompleted structure sat in the area for more than a decade before being torn down.

During the presidency of Ferdinand E. Marcos, the plans for a legislative complex were revived. By that time, the 1973 constitution had replaced the bicameral Congress with the Batasang Pambansa, a unicameral parliament. The new complex was accordingly designed to house only one legislative body. Felipe M. Mendoza was designated as the architect of the complex and its surrounding area. The uncompleted structure for the Capitol building was torn down to make way for the new complex. The North and South Wing Buildings were completed in December 1977. Meanwhile, the Main Building itself finally opened on May 31, 1978. However, the rest of the intended government buildings and public spaces around the complex were never built.

The legislative body, known as the Interim Batasang Pambansa, first convened at the Main Building on June 12, 1978.

=== Turnover to the House of Representatives ===
However, under the 1987 Constitution, the legislative branch again became bicameral. The numerically larger House of Representatives retained the session hall and offices of the old Batasang Pambansa on the grounds of the complex. The smaller, newly reinstated Senate returned to the original legislative building in Manila (reinstated as capital city in 1976) and held their plenary sessions there until the building was turned over to the National Museum of the Philippines under the presidency of Fidel V. Ramos. The Senate has since moved to the GSIS Building on reclaimed land on Manila Bay in Pasay, holding their plenary sessions there since May 1997.

=== Expansion ===
Apart from designing the core buildings of the complex, Felipe M. Mendoza and his office also allotted a master plan for possible expansion of the complex. These included:

- A Senate Building, containing the Senate Session Hall and Offices, on the open area at the eastern side of the Main Building
- The Library of Congress, Museum, and Archives on the western side of the complex
- Several other ancillary buildings

Plans and scale models for the expansion were developed in 1978, but were not implemented.

In March 2001, the Ramon V. Mitra Jr. Building was completed. Currently headquartered in the building are the Legislative Library, the Committee offices, the Reference and Research Bureau, and the conference rooms.

The South Wing Annex Building started construction in 2008 and was inaugurated on June 29, 2010.

In January 2025, Speaker Martin Romualdez led the opening ceremony of the Jose de Venecia Building and Museum.

=== 2007 bombing ===
On the evening of November 13, 2007, a bomb attached to a motorcycle exploded near the south wing of the complex. Basilan representative Wahab Akbar was killed in the explosion alongside five congressional staffers, while representative Pryde Henry Teves of Negros Oriental's 3rd district was injured. Among the suspects arrested, Ikram Indama was later found guilty by the Quezon City Regional Trial Court Branch 83 in perpetrating the attack, being sentenced in 2017 to life imprisonment without parole.

== Interior ==
=== Session Hall ===
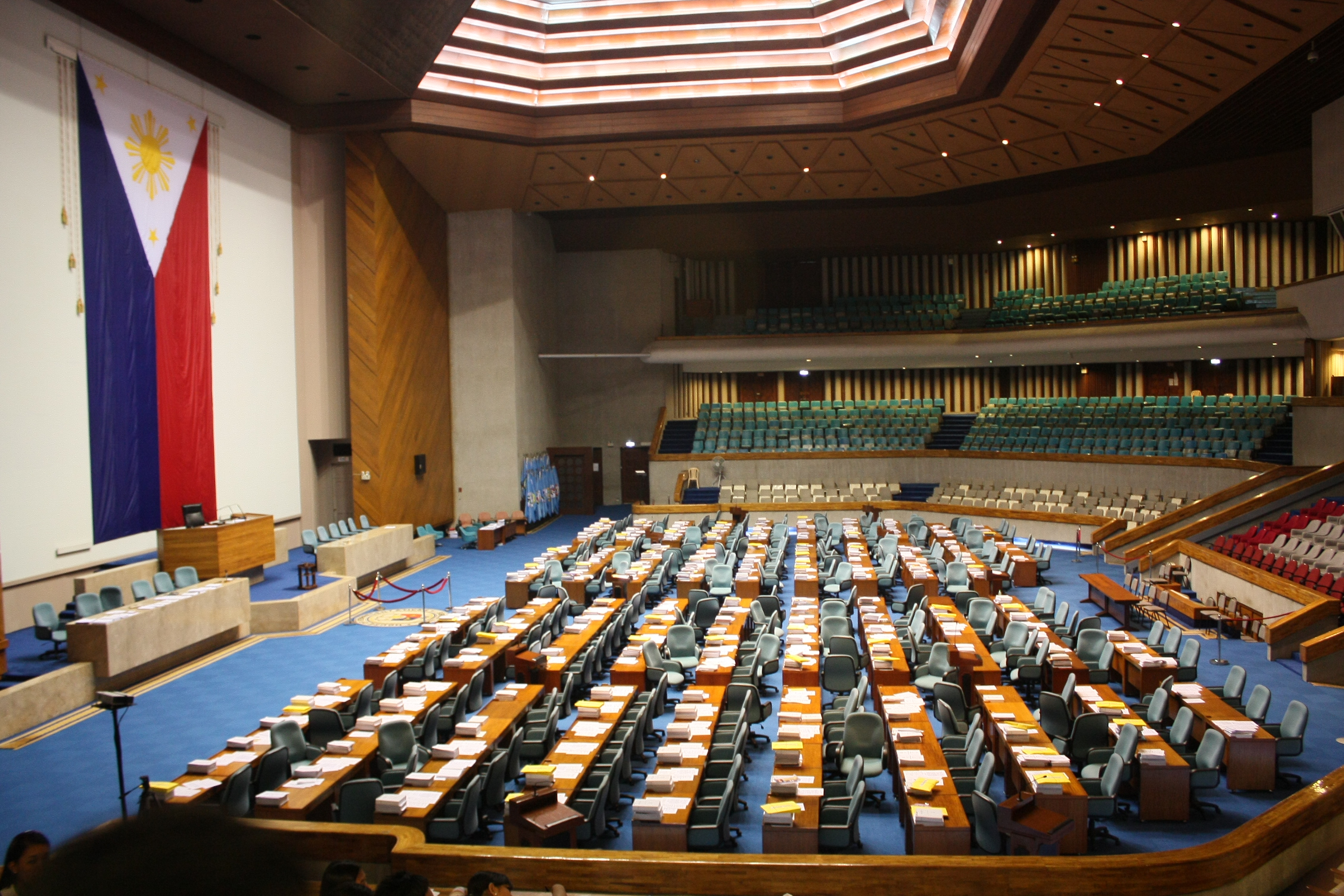
The Session Hall before 2022

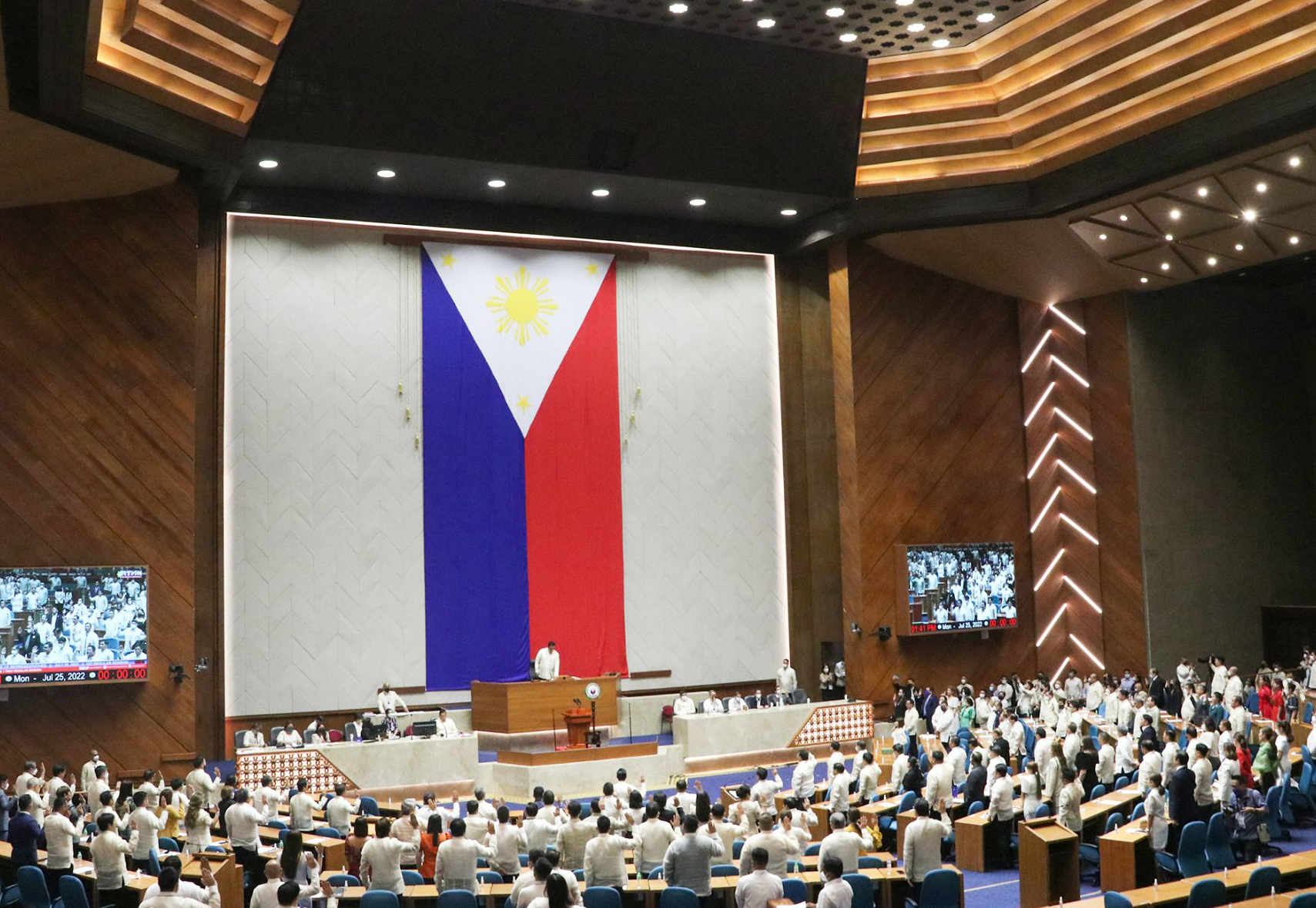
The Session Hall after the 2022 renovations

Members of the House of Representatives hold their plenary sessions at the Session Hall, located inside the Main Building. Comprising more than 200 members elected by first past the post and more than 50 members elected by closed party list, the legislators debate economic, social and other issues inside the complex.

The Session Hall is also used for joint sessions of the Congress, such as election results, confirmation meetings, and addresses by the president of the Philippines or other guests of honor. The president's annual State of the Nation Address delivered to a joint session of Congress is one example of such a speech.

The Session Hall has a seating capacity for about 1,500 people.

At the start of President Bongbong Marcos's administration in 2022, the session hall was redesigned into a hemicycle layout to accommodate up to 350 members.

The plenary hall comprises five galleries:

- First and Second Galleries: Open to the general public who wish to observe plenary proceedings
- Middle Gallery: Reserved for special guests of members of the House, VIPs, high-ranking government officials, and the diplomatic corps
- Speakers Gallery (North and South Wings): Exhibits the portraits of the incumbent and previous speakers of the House made by artist Edwin Sion

== Exterior ==
The eastern grounds of the complex

=== Grounds ===
The complex is composed of five main structures and has a total area of 16 hectares. The Main Building is the central feature of the complex, and is bounded by the other buildings.

The buildings include:

- Main Building: The Main Building houses the Plenary Hall and the offices of the speaker, deputy speakers, and the majority and minority floor leaders.
- North Wing Building: The North Wing serves as the location of the officers of House members and the Secretariat.
- South Wing Building: Other offices of House members and the Secretariat are also located in the South Wing Building.
- Ramon V. Mitra (RVM) Building: The building, named after Ramon Mitra Jr. who served as speaker of the reestablished House of Representatives from 1987 to 1992, hosts the offices of the members of the House, conference rooms, and several committee officers.
- South Wing Annex Building: The annex of the South Wing contains some conference rooms and offices of the House Secretariat.
- Jose de Venecia Building and Museum: Used to be known as the "People's Center", the building was inaugurated on January 28, 2025, named after and houses a museum in honor of five-term former speaker Jose de Venecia.

=== Other facilities ===
Aside from the offices of the House, the facilities at the Batasang Pambansa include a medical and dental clinic, two banks, a post office, two telegraph offices, two motor pools, a fire station, a gas station, security barracks for the marines, parking space for 300 cars and a police detachment. It also includes recreational facilities like the tennis and basketball courts, a gym and fitness center, a day care center, and a clubhouse and fast food center.
