= List of bus routes in Metro Manila =

This list of bus routes in Metro Manila includes all commercially operated local bus routes in the National Capital Region and surrounding areas, as well as the contracted express bus service operated under the Premium Point-to-Point Bus Service branding. Bus services in Metro Manila are regulated by the Department of Transportation in partnership with the Metropolitan Manila Development Authority and operated by private bus operators, individually licensed by the Land Transportation Franchising and Regulatory Board. As of August 2020, of the more than 300 public transport routes available in Metro Manila, 64 routes are being serviced by public utility buses in the metropolitan region.

== Routes ==
=== Local service ===
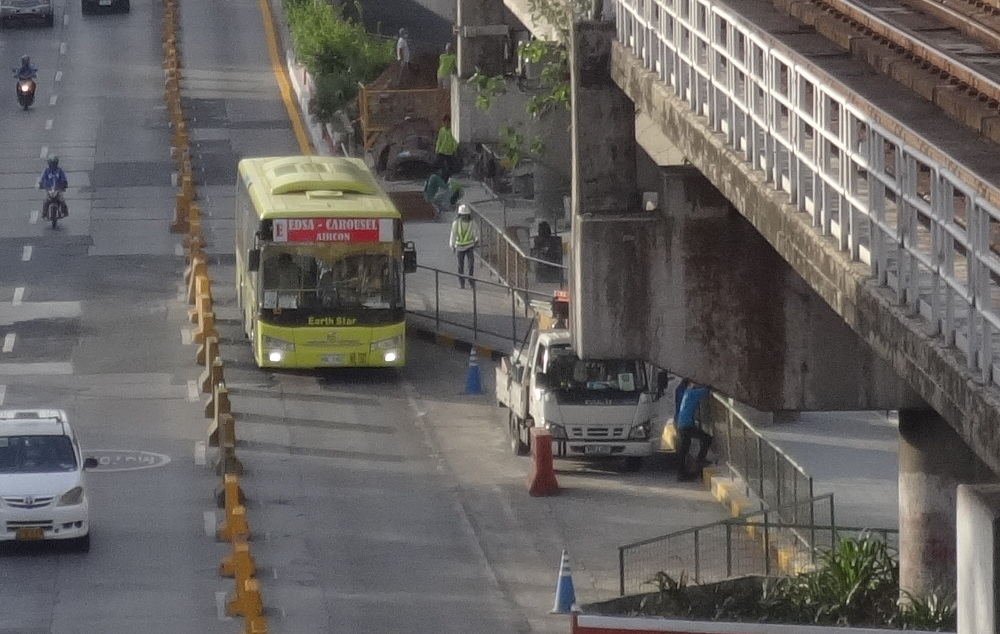
The EDSA Carousel services Route E along Metro Manila's main thoroughfare.

All Metro Manila's local or city bus services are contracted out to private firms. Prior to the 2020 Philippine coronavirus lockdowns, the region had more than 900 public transport routes operated by 830 bus franchises and more than 43,000 jeepney franchises competing with each other. This extremely deregulated public transport environment has made managing public transport services a challenge for the government for many years. The oversupply of public utility vehicles as well as redundant and overlapping transport routes have also led to severe road congestion.

In June 2020, the Department of Transportation launched the Metro Manila Bus Rationalization Program in a complete overhaul of Manila's bus transport network. The program was a follow through of the 2017 Public Utility Vehicle Modernization Program and coincided with the government's gradual and calibrated resumption of Manila's public transport following more than two months under coronavirus restrictions.

On July 1, the EDSA Carousel line (Route E) started its interim operations with a total of fifteen stops in dedicated bus lanes completed by the Metropolitan Manila Development Authority. On August 17, 2020, the Land Transportation Franchising and Regulatory Board added four more city bus routes.

Due to the further easing of COVID-19 pandemic restrictions, the LTFRB noted that the rationalized bus routes were "not responsive to the existing demand of passengers". Furthermore, in anticipation of increased passenger volume due to the return of full onsite classes and onsite work, the LTFRB announced through LTFRB Memorandum Circular No. 67 series of 2022 on August 19, 2022, the reopening of many pre-pandemic route franchises for public buses, jeepneys, and the UV Express. Based on this, the 39 existing bus routes under the rationalized bus routes program were modified to include 32 pre-pandemic bus routes and retain rationalized bus routes that "were found to be responsive to passenger demand". On September 29, 2022, an additional 20 bus route franchises were also approved through LTFRB Memorandum Circular No. 74 series of 2022. On December 15, 2022, modifications were made to seven of the existing routes through LTFRB Memorandum Circular No. 82 series of 2022, while six new routes were opened through LTFRB Memorandum Circular No. 83 series of 2022. Both changes were made effective on December 26, 2022. In June 2023, the LTFRB announced new bus routes to serve Philippine National Railways passengers once the construction of the North-South Commuter Railway commences. In August 2023, modification of some pre-pandemic routes were made through LTFRB Board Resolution No. 55 series of 2023, and LTFRB Board Resolution No. 57 series of 2023.

As of November 2024, there are a total of 68 local bus routes in Metro Manila franchised out to private bus operators.

Route		Terminals			Route Structure	Length	Service area	Notes
1	EDSA Carousel	Caloocan; Monumento	↔	Bay City; Parañaque Integrated Terminal Exchange	All trips: Monumento; EDSA; Globe Rotonda; Macapagal Boulevard	28.0 km (17.4 mi)	Caloocan, Makati, Mandaluyong, Parañaque, Pasay, Quezon City	Still called as EDSA Carousel or Route E
2	Angono – Quiapo via Ortigas, Sta. Mesa	Angono; SM Center Angono	↔	Quiapo; Quiapo Church	All trips: Manila East Road; Ortigas Avenue; Granada Street; N. Domingo Street; Gregorio Araneta Avenue; Magsaysay Boulevard; Legarda Street; Quezon Boulevard; Westbound trips: P. Casal Street; C. Palanca Street; Eastbound trips: Recto Avenue	27.9 km (17.3 mi)	Angono, Cainta, Mandaluyong, Manila, Pasig, Quezon City, San Juan, Taytay	Originally Route 11: Gilmore-Taytay, and pre-pandemic Cainta-Quiapo and Taytay-Quiapo routes. Most buses terminate at Taytay.
3	Antipolo – Quiapo via Cubao, Sta. Mesa	Antipolo; Robinsons Antipolo	↔	Quiapo; Quiapo Church	All trips: Sumulong Highway; Marikina–Infanta Highway; Aurora Boulevard; Magsaysay Boulevard; Legarda Street; Quezon Boulevard; Westbound trips: P. Casal Street; C. Palanca Street; Eastbound trips: Recto Avenue	28.4 km (17.6 mi)	Antipolo, Cainta, Manila, Marikina, Pasig, Quezon City, San Juan	Originally Route 8: Cubao-Montalban, Route 9: Cubao-Antipolo, Route 10: Cubao-Doroteo Jose, and pre-pandemic Montalban-Divisoria via Sumulong route. Buses still terminate at Farmers Plaza Also serves as augmentation for LRT Line 2.
4	PITX – BGC via Buendia	McKinley Hill; Venice Grand Canal Mall	↔	Bay City; Parañaque Integrated Terminal Exchange	All trips: McWest Boulevard; Upper McKinley Road; Circumferential Road 5; 32nd Street; Kalayaan Flyover; Gil Puyat Avenue; Macapagal Boulevard; Jose W. Diokno Boulevard; Westbound trips: Chateau Road; Lombard Street; EDSA; Globe Rotonda; Eastbound trips: Seaside Drive	15.6 km (9.7 mi)	Parañaque, Pasay, Taguig	Originally Route 13: Buendia – BGC, and pre-pandemic MOA-C5 Buting route. The sole operator, Green Frog Hybrid Bus, terminates most units at Kalayaan instead of proceeding to Venice.
5	Sta. Maria – PITX via Balintawak, Quiapo	Santa Maria; Caypombo	↔	Bay City; Parañaque Integrated Terminal Exchange	All trips: Norzagaray–Santa Maria Road; Santa Maria Bypass Road; Fortunato Halili Avenue; North Luzon Expressway; Andres Bonifacio Avenue; Blumentritt Road; Dimasalang Street; Laon Laan Street; A. Mendoza Street; Quezon Boulevard; Padre Burgos Avenue; Taft Avenue; Gil Puyat Avenue; Macapagal Boulevard; Northbound trips: Retiro Street; Southbound trips: Aurora Boulevard; Roxas Boulevard; EDSA; Globe Rotonda	37.8 km (23.5 mi)	Bocaue, Manila, Parañaque, Pasay, Quezon City, Santa Maria	Originally Route 39, but still focuses on the same route
6	Sapang Palay – PITX via Commonwealth, Quiapo	Norzagaray; Sapang Palay	↔	Bay City; Parañaque Integrated Terminal Exchange	All trips: Balasing–San Jose Road; Roquero Avenue (Briefly); Bagong Buhay Avenue; Roquero Avenue; Del Monte–Norzagaray Road; Quirino Highway; Mindanao Avenue; Commonwealth Avenue; Elliptical Road; Quezon Avenue; España Boulevard; Lerma Street; Quezon Boulevard; Padre Burgos Avenue; Taft Avenue; Gil Puyat Avenue; Macapagal Boulevard; Northbound trips: Regalado Highway; Southbound trips: Belfast Street; EDSA; Globe Rotonda	59.4 km (36.9 mi)	Caloocan, Manila, Norzagaray, Parañaque, Pasay, Quezon City, San Jose del Monte	Originally Route 5: Quezon Ave-Angat, and pre-pandemic Norzagaray-Baclaran, Sapang Palay-Baclaran, Grotto-Baclaran via Commonwealth-EDSA and Marilao Exit routes. In October 2025, the route was extended to include northern SJDM areas between Quirino Highway and Sapang Palay.
6A	Sapang Palay – NIA via Commonwealth	Norzagaray; Sapang Palay	↔	Triangle Park; Eton Centris	All trips: Balasing–San Jose Road; Roquero Avenue (briefly); Bagong Buhay Avenue; Roquero Avenue; Del Monte–Norzagaray Road; Quirino Highway; Mindanao Avenue; Commonwealth Avenue; Elliptical Road; East Avenue; Internal Road; NIA South Road; Northbound trips: EDSA; NPO Road; BIR Road; Regalado Highway; Southbound trips: Belfast Street; EDSA	38.2 km (23.7 mi)	Caloocan, Norzagaray, Quezon City, San Jose del Monte	The route was created in October 2025 by splitting Route 6 into two, with Route 6 ending at PITX and Route 6A ending at NIA South Road.
7	Fairview – PITX via Commonwealth, Quiapo	Novaliches; SM City Fairview	↔	Bay City; Parañaque Integrated Terminal Exchange	All trips: Quirino Highway; Mindanao Avenue; Commonwealth Avenue; Elliptical Road; Quezon Avenue; España Boulevard; Lerma Street; Quezon Boulevard; Padre Burgos Avenue; Taft Avenue; Gil Puyat Avenue; Roxas Boulevard; Macapagal Boulevard; Northbound trips: Seaside Drive; Regalado Highway; Southbound trips: Belfast Street; EDSA; Globe Rotonda	38.5 km (23.9 mi)	Manila, Parañaque, Pasay, Quezon City	Originally Route 6: Quezon Ave-EDSA Taft, and pre-pandemic Novaliches-Baclaran via EDSA, and SM Fairview-Baclaran via Commonwealth-EDSA and Quezon Avenue routes. Also known as SM Fairview-PITX. Until October 2025, Route 7 traversed East Avenue and Timog Avenue until it was modified to go directly to Quezon Avenue from Elliptical Road.
8	Angat – Divisoria via Sta. Maria, Balintawak	Angat; Angat Public Market	↔	Tondo; Divisoria	Matias Fernando Avenue; Norzagaray–Santa Maria Road; Santa Maria Bypass Road; Fortunato Halili Avenue; North Luzon Expressway; Andres Bonifacio Avenue; 5th Avenue; Rizal Avenue; Abad Santos Avenue; Recto Avenue	53.4 km (33.2 mi)	Angat, Bocaue, Caloocan, Manila, Norzagaray, Quezon City, Santa Maria	Originally a provincial bus route
9	Angat – Monumento via Sta. Maria, Balintawak	Angat; Angat Public Market	↔	Caloocan; Monumento	Matias Fernando Avenue; Norzagaray–Santa Maria Road; Santa Maria Bypass Road; Fortunato Halili Avenue; North Luzon Expressway; EDSA	41.2 km (25.6 mi)	Angat, Bocaue, Caloocan, Norzagaray, Santa Maria	Originally Route 22, but still focuses on the same route
10	Ayala – Alabang	Makati CBD; One Ayala	↔	Alabang; Vista Terminal Exchange	All trips: Manila South Road; South Luzon Expressway; EDSA; Northbound trips: East Service Road; Osmeña Highway; Gil Puyat Avenue; Ayala Avenue	19.4 km (12.1 mi) (northbound); 17.0 km (10.6 mi)(southbound)	Makati, Muntinlupa, Parañaque	Originally Route 14, but still focuses on the same route Reinalyn Bus Line units terminate at Festival Alabang or South Station Terminals
11	Balibago – Buendia via Ayala	Pasay; Gil Puyat station	↔	Santa Rosa; Target Mall	All trips: Francisco A. Canicosa Avenue; Santa Rosa–Tagaytay Road; South Luzon Expressway; Gil Puyat Avenue; Taft Avenue; Northbound trips: Pearl Road; EDSA; Ayala Avenue; Malugay Street; Zuellig Loop; Southbound trips: Osmeña Highway; Turquoise Road; Diamond Road; Zircon Road; Chalcedony Road	40.1 km (24.9 mi) (northbound); 39.6 km (24.6 mi) (southbound)	Makati, Pasay, Santa Rosa	Originally Route 35: Ayala-Balibago
11	Balibago – Buendia via Ayala	Makati CBD; One Ayala	↔	Santa Rosa; Target Mall	All trips: Santa Rosa–Tagaytay Road; South Luzon Expressway; EDSA; Northbound trips: Pearl Road; Southbound trips: Francisco A. Canicosa Avenue; Turquoise Road; Diamond Road; Zircon Road; Chalcedony Road	34.5 km (21.4 mi) (northbound); 35.2 km (21.9 mi) (southbound)	Makati, Santa Rosa	Originally Route 35: Ayala-Balibago
12	Biñan – Buendia via Ayala, Susana	Pasay; Gil Puyat station	↔	Biñan; JAC Liner Biñan Terminal	All trips: Santo Domingo Street; A. Bonifacio Street; Manila South Road; Susana Heights Access Road; South Luzon Expressway; Gil Puyat Avenue; Taft Avenue; Northbound trips: EDSA; Ayala Avenue; Malugay Street; Zuellig Loop; Southbound trips: Osmeña Highway	31.1 km (19.3 mi) (northbound); 34.2 km (21.3 mi) (southbound)	Biñan, Makati, Muntinlupa, Pasay, San Pedro	Originally Route 15. Most Biñan-bound buses exit at South Luzon Expressway's Carmona Exit, while buses that exit at Susana Heights Exit terminate at Pacita Complex.
12	Biñan – Buendia via Ayala, Susana	Makati CBD; One Ayala	↔	Biñan; JAC Liner Biñan Terminal	All trips: Santo Domingo Street; A. Bonifacio Street; Manila South Road; Susana Heights Access Road; South Luzon Expressway; Northbound trips: Osmeña Highway; Gil Puyat Avenue; Ayala Avenue; Southbound trips: EDSA	32.7 km (20.3 mi) (northbound); 29 km (18 mi) (southbound)	Biñan, Makati, Muntinlupa, San Pedro	Originally Route 15. Most Biñan-bound buses exit at South Luzon Expressway's Carmona Exit, while buses that exit at Susana Heights Exit terminate at Pacita Complex.
13	Bagong Silang – Sta. Cruz via Malinta, Balintawak	Caloocan; Bagong Silang	↔	Santa Cruz; Avenida Bus Terminal	All trips: Old Zabarte Road; Zabarte Road; Quirino Highway; General Luis Street; Bagbaguin Road; North Luzon Expressway; Andres Bonifacio Avenue; Blumentritt Road; Dimasalang Street; Northbound trips: Oroquieta Road; San Lazaro Street; Maria Elena Street; Retiro Street; Buenamar Street; Sarmiento Street; Phase 1 Package 1; Langit Road; Southbound trips: Aurora Boulevard; Laon Laan Road; A. Mendoza Street; Fugoso Street; Tomas Mapua Street	26.7 km (16.6 mi)	Caloocan, Manila, Quezon City, Valenzuela	Originally a pre-pandemic route
14	Balagtas – PITX via Monumento, Quiapo	Balagtas; Metrolink Bus Corp. Terminal	↔	Bay City; Parañaque Integrated Terminal Exchange	All trips: MacArthur Highway; Rizal Avenue; Padre Burgos Avenue; Taft Avenue; Gil Puyat Avenue; Macapagal Boulevard; Seaside Drive; Northbound trips: Carriedo Street; Southbound trips: Ronquillo Street; Plaza Santa Cruz Road; Jose W. Diokno Boulevard; EDSA; Globe Rotonda	42.6 km (26.5 mi)	Balagtas, Bocaue, Caloocan, Malabon, Manila, Marilao, Meycauayan, Parañaque, Pasay, Valenzuela	Originally Route 1: Monumento-Balagtas, and pre-pandemic Malanday-Baclaran and Malanday-NAIA via EDSA Ayala Avenue routes.
15	BGC – Alabang	Bonifacio Global City; Market! Market!	↔	Alabang; Vista Terminal Exchange	Carlos P. Garcia Avenue; South Luzon Expressway	17.2 km (10.7 mi)	Muntinlupa, Taguig	Originally Route 25: BGC-Alabang, and pre-pandemic Express Connect routes. BGC - Pacita was originally via Pacita Avenue but was revised into Carmona Exit via General Malvar Street and Governor's Drive.
15	BGC – Pacita via Susana	Bonifacio Global City; Market! Market!	↔	San Pedro; Pacita Complex	All trips: Carlos P. Garcia Avenue; South Luzon Expressway; Susana Heights Access Road; Manila South Road; Northbound trips: General Malvar Street; Governor's Drive; Southwoods Avenue; Ecocentrum Avenue; Southbound trips: South Station; Alabang-Zapote Road; Susana Heights Access Road	27.3 km (17.0 mi)	Biñan, Carmona, Muntinlupa, San Pedro, Taguig	Originally Route 25: BGC-Alabang, and pre-pandemic Express Connect routes. BGC - Pacita was originally via Pacita Avenue but was revised into Carmona Exit via General Malvar Street and Governor's Drive.
16	Balibago – Cubao via BGC	Santa Rosa; Target Mall	↔	Araneta City; Farmers Plaza	Times Square Avenue; P. Tuazon Boulevard; 20th Avenue; Bonny Serrano Avenue; Eulogio Rodriguez Jr. Avenue Avenue; Carlos P. Garcia Avenue; South Luzon Expressway; Santa Rosa–Tagaytay Road	46.2 km (28.7 mi)	Pasig, Quezon City, Santa Rosa, Taguig	Originally Route 25: BGC-Alabang, and a pre-pandemic route
17	Fairview – Ayala via Commonwealth, Quiapo	Novaliches; SM City Fairview	↔	Makati CBD; One Ayala	All trips: Quirino Highway; Commonwealth Avenue; Elliptical Road; Quezon Avenue; España Boulevard; Lerma Street; Quezon Boulevard; Padre Burgos Avenue; Taft Avenue; Gil Puyat Avenue; Ayala Avenue; Northbound trips: Ayala Avenue; Malugay Street; Zuellig Loop; Southbound trips: Belfast Street; Mindanao Avenue	34.5 km (21.4 mi)	Makati, Manila, Pasay, Quezon City	Originally a pre-pandemic SM Fairview-Baclaran via EDSA Ayala Avenue route. Buses terminate at Eton Centris
18	North EDSA – PITX via Katipunan, BGC	Diliman; SM North EDSA	↔	Bay City; Parañaque Integrated Terminal Exchange	All trips: EDSA; Congressional Avenue; Luzon Avenue; Tandang Sora Avenue; Katipunan Avenue; Bonny Serrano Avenue; Eulogio Rodriguez Jr. Avenue; Carlos P. Garcia Avenue; Upper McKinley Road; Venezia Drive; Turin Street; Lawton Avenue; Andrews Avenue; Domestic Road; NAIA Road; Seaside Drive; Macapagal Boulevard; Northbound trips: Junction Road; Eastwood Ave; Orchard Drive; Mindanao Avenue; North Avenue; Southbound trips: Park Avenue; Campus Avenue	32.7 km (20.3 mi)	Parañaque, Pasay, Pasig, Quezon City, Taguig	Originally Route 19: North EDSA-BGC, and pre-pandemic SM Fairview-Buendia via EDSA Ayala route Venice Grand Canal Mall acts as a semi-terminus, with most buses turning back north, instead of proceeding to PITX, or making PITX-Venice Grand Canal Mall and Venice Grand Canal Mall-North EDSA separate trips.
19	Norzagaray FVR – Sta. Cruz via Marilao, Balintawak	Norzagaray; Sapang Palay	↔	Santa Cruz; Avenida Bus Terminal	All trips: Balasing–San Jose Road; Roquero Avenue (Briefly); Matiyaga Street; Maginhawa Street; Roquero Avenue; Bagong Buhay Avenue; Norzagaray; San Ignacio Street; Paso Street (To San Jose Del Monte and Briefly); San Jose Street (To San Jose Del Monte); JP Rizal Street (To San Jose Del Monte); San Ignacio Street; Villarica Road; Patubig Road; North Luzon Expressway; Andres Bonifacio Avenue; Blumentritt Road; Dimasalang Street; Doroteo Jose Street; Northbound trips: Oroquieta Road; San Lazaro Street; Maria Clara Street; Retiro Street; Roquero Avenue; Southbound trips: Aurora Boulevard; Laon Laan Street; A. Mendoza Street; Fugoso Street; Tomas Mapua Street	36.3 km (22.6 mi)	Manila, Marilao, Norzagaray, Quezon City, San Jose del Monte	Originally Route 21: Monumento-SJDM, and a pre-pandemic route
20	Sapang Palay – Sta. Cruz via Malinta, Balintawak	San Jose del Monte; Sapang Palay	↔	Santa Cruz; Avenida Bus Terminal	All trips: Roquero Avenue; Bagong Buhay Avenue; Norzagaray; San Ignacio Street; Paso Street (To San Jose Del Monte); San Jose Street (To San Jose Del Monte); JP Rizal Street (To San Jose Del Monte); San Ignacio Street; San Jose del Monte-Marilao Road; Santa Maria–Tungkong Mangga Road; Quirino Highway (To San Jose Del Monte and Briefly); Bocaue Road(To San Jose Del Monte); Quirino Highway; General Luis Street; Bagbaguin Road; Paso De Blas Road; North Luzon Expressway; Andres Bonifacio Avenue; Blumentritt Road; Dimasalang Street; Northbound trips: Oroquieta Road; San Lazaro Street; Maria Clara Street; Retiro Street; Buenamar Street; Sarmiento Street; Belfast Street; Mindanao Avenue; Apayao Street; J.P. Rizal Street; San Jose Street; Paso Street; Southbound trips: Mahogany Street; Acacia Street; Aurora Boulevard; Laon Laan Street; A. Mendoza Street; Fugoso Street; Tomas Mapua Street	40.2 km (25.0 mi)	Caloocan, Manila, Quezon City, San Jose del Monte, Valenzuela	Originally a pre-pandemic route
21	Sapang Palay – Sta. Cruz via Sta. Maria, Balintawak	San Jose del Monte; Sapang Palay	↔	Santa Cruz; Avenida Bus Terminal	All trips: Bagong Buhay Avenue; San Ignacio Street; Santa Maria–San Jose Road; Santa Maria Bypass Road; Fortunato Halili Avenue; North Luzon Expressway; Andres Bonifacio Avenue; Blumentritt Road; Dimasalang Street; Doroteo Jose Street; Northbound trips: Oroquieta Road; San Lazaro Street; Maria Clara Street; Retiro Street; Southbound trips: Aurora Boulevard; Laon Laan Street; A. Mendoza Street; Fugoso Street; Tomas Mapua Street	44.0 km (27.3 mi)	Bocaue, Manila, Quezon City, San Jose del Monte, Santa Maria	Originally a pre-pandemic route.
22	Sta. Maria – PITX via Balintawak, Manila Pier	Santa Maria; Caypombo	↔	Bay City; Parañaque Integrated Terminal Exchange	Santa Maria Bypass Road; Fortunato Halili Avenue; North Luzon Expressway; Andres Bonifacio Avenue; 5th Avenue; C-3 Road; Radial Road 10; Mel Lopez Boulevard; Bonifacio Drive; Roxas Boulevard; Seaside Drive; Macapagal Boulevard	43.2 km (26.8 mi)	Bocaue, Manila, Parañaque, Pasay, Quezon City, Santa Maria	Originally Route 2: Monumento-PITX, Route 22: Monumento-Angat, and a pre-pandemic Sta.Maria-Baclaran via McArthur Highway, EDSA route
23	Alabang – Lawton via PITX, Zapote	Alabang; Vista Terminal Exchange	↔	Ermita; Lawton	All trips: Padre Burgos Avenue; Taft Avenue; Gil Puyat Avenue; Roxas Boulevard; Seaside Drive; Macapagal Boulevard; Pacific Avenue; Manila–Cavite Expressway; Alabang–Zapote Road; Bridgeway Avenue; Manila South Road; Southbound trips: Jose W. Diokno Boulevard	24.0 km (14.9 mi)	Bacoor, Las Piñas, Manila, Muntinlupa, Parañaque, Pasay	Originally Route 24: PITX-Alabang, and a pre-pandemic route
24	Alabang – Lawton via Magallanes	Alabang; Vista Terminal Exchange	↔	Ermita; Lawton	Alabang–Zapote Road; South Luzon Expressway; Gil Puyat Avenue; Taft Avenue; Padre Burgos Avenue	25.1 km (15.6 mi)	Makati, Manila, Muntinlupa, Parañaque, Pasay	Originally a pre-pandemic route
25	Biñan – Lawton via Magallanes	Biñan; JAC Liner Biñan Terminal	↔	Ermita; Lawton	Santo Domingo Street; A. Bonifacio Street; Manila South Road; South Luzon Expressway; Osmeña Highway; Gil Puyat Avenue; Taft Avenue; Padre Burgos Avenue	36.0 km (22.4 mi)	Biñan, Makati, Manila, Muntinlupa, San Pedro	Originally a pre-pandemic route
26	Cavite City – PITX via Noveleta	Cavite City; Saulog Transit Terminal	↔	Bay City; Parañaque Integrated Terminal Exchange	All trips: Dra. Salamanca Street; Manila–Cavite Road; Magdiwang Highway; Tirona Highway; Manila–Cavite Expressway; Macapagal Boulevard; Westbound trips: Pacific Avenue; Julian Felipe Boulevard; M. Gregorio Road; Eastbound trips: Lopez Jaena Street; Miranda Street; Covelandia Road; Seaside Drive	24.7 km (15.3 mi) (westbound) 26.9 km (16.7 mi) (eastbound)	Cavite City, Kawit, Noveleta, Parañaque	Originally Route 30, but still focuses on the same route
27	Dasmariñas – Lawton via PITX, Imus	Dasmariñas; SM City Dasmariñas	↔	Ermita; Lawton	Pala-Pala Road; Aguinaldo Highway; Manila–Cavite Expressway; Pacific Avenue; Macapagal Boulevard; Jose W. Diokno Boulevard; Gil Puyat Avenue; Taft Avenue; Padre Burgos Avenue	40.4 km (25.1 mi)	Bacoor, Dasmariñas, Imus, Manila, Parañaque, Pasay	Originally Route 28: PITX-Dasmariñas, and a pre-pandemic route
28	Naic – PITX via Kawit	Naic; Naic Grand Central Terminal	↔	Bay City; Parañaque Integrated Terminal Exchange	All trips: Poblete Street; Antero Soriano Highway; Manila–Cavite Expressway; Pacific Avenue; Macapagal Boulevard; Eastbound trips: Covelandia Road	34.5 km (21.4 mi)	General Trias, Kawit, Naic, Noveleta, Parañaque, Tanza	Originally Route 26, but still focuses on the same route
29	Silang – Lawton via PITX, Imus	Silang; Acienda Outlet Mall	↔	Manila; Lawton	Aguinaldo Highway; Manila–Cavite Expressway; Pacific Avenue; Macapagal Boulevard	47.6 km (29.6 mi)	Bacoor, Dasmariñas, Imus, Silang, Parañaque, Pasay	Originally Route 28: PITX-Dasmariñas, and a pre-pandemic route
30	Balibago – Buendia via Magallanes	Santa Rosa; Target Mall	↔	Pasay; Gil Puyat station	All trips: Pearl Road; Francisco A. Canicosa Avenue; Santa Rosa–Tagaytay Road; South Luzon Expressway; Osmeña Highway; Gil Puyat Avenue; Northbound trips: Emerald Road; Southbound trips: Turquoise Road; Diamond Road; Zircon Road; Amethyst Road	38 km (24 mi) (northbound); 38 km (24 mi) (southbound)	Makati, Pasay, Santa Rosa	Originally Route 34: PITX-SRIT, and pre-pandemic Balibago-Buendia via SLEX route
31	Trece Martires - Lawton via PITX, Imus	Trece Martires; SM City Trece Martires	↔	Ermita; Lawton	Capitol Road; Governor's Drive; Aguinaldo Highway; Aguinaldo Boulevard; Manila–Cavite Expressway; Macapagal Boulevard; Gil Puyat Avenue; Roxas Boulevard; Quirino Avenue; Taft Avenue; Padre Burgos Avenue	49.1 km (30.5 mi)	Bacoor, Dasmariñas, General Trias, Imus, Manila, Parañaque, Pasay, Tanza, Trece Martires	Originally Route 27 but still focuses on the same route except Don Aldrin Transport. Don Aldrin Transport operates in One Ayala - Trece Martires route. Most buses use Aguinaldo Highway
31	Trece Martires – Ayala via Imus	Trece Martires; SM City Trece Martires	↔	Makati CBD; One Ayala	All trips: Capitol Road; Governor's Drive; Aguinaldo Highway; Aguinaldo Boulevard; Manila–Cavite Expressway; Roxas Boulevard; Gil Puyat Avenue; Ayala Avenue; EDSA; Westbound trips: Governor's Drive; Malugay Street; Zuellig Loop	47.9 km (29.8 mi)	Bacoor, Dasmariñas, General Trias, Imus, Makati, Pasay, Parañaque,Tanza, Trece Martires	Originally Route 27 but still focuses on the same route except Don Aldrin Transport. Don Aldrin Transport operates in One Ayala - Trece Martires route. Most buses use Aguinaldo Highway
32	Gen. Mariano Alvarez – PITX via Molino, Paliparan	General Mariano Alvarez; GMA Central Terminal	↔	Bay City; Parañaque Integrated Terminal Exchange	Congressional Road; Governor's Drive; Molino–Paliparan Road; Bacoor Boulevard; Aguinaldo Boulevard; Manila–Cavite Expressway; Pacific Avenue; Macapagal Boulevard	31.5 km (19.6 mi)	Bacoor, Dasmariñas, General Mariano Alvarez, Parañaque, Silang	Originally Route 29, but still focuses on the same route
33	Fairview – North EDSA via Novaliches	Diliman; SM North EDSA	↔	Novaliches; SM City Fairview	All trips: EDSA; Congressional Avenue; Mindanao Avenue; Quirino Highway; Northbound trips: Belfast Street; Regalado Highway; Southbound trips: North Avenue	12.2 km (7.6 mi)	Quezon City	Originally Route 4: North EDSA-Fairview, and pre-pandemic Novaliches-Baclaran, and Novaliches-Alabang via EDSA, Mindanao Avenue routes. Buses still terminate at SM City Fairview or Nova Stop.
33	Fairview – One Ayala via Novaliches, EDSA Carousel	Novaliches; SM City Fairview	↔	Makati CBD; One Ayala	All trips: Quirino Highway; Mindanao Avenue; North Avenue; Senator Miriam P. Defensor-Santiago Avenue; Quezon Avenue; EDSA; Northbound trips: Belfast Street; Regalado Highway	24.5 km (15.2 mi)	Makati, Mandaluyong, Quezon City	A new experimental bus route to be operated by buses under Route 33: North EDSA-Fairview/SJDM
34	Montalban – PITX via Batasan, Quiapo	Rodriguez; San Rafael	↔	Bay City; Parañaque Integrated Terminal Exchange	All trips: Rodriguez Highway; Jose P. Rizal Street; General Luna Avenue; Batasan–San Mateo Road; Batasan Road; Commonwealth Avenue; Elliptical Road; Quezon Avenue; España Boulevard; Lerma Street; Quezon Boulevard; Padre Burgos Avenue; Taft Avenue; Gil Puyat Avenue; Roxas Boulevard; Macapagal Boulevard; Northbound trips: Seaside Drive; Southbound trips: Jose W. Diokno Boulevard; EDSA; Globe Rotonda	40.5 km (25.2 mi)	Manila, Parañaque, Pasay, Quezon City, Rodriguez, San Mateo	Originally Route 7: Quezon Ave-Montalban, Route 8: Cubao-Montalban, and pre-pandemic San Mateo-Baclaran via EDSA, Batasan route. Buses still terminate at Eton Centris.
35	Balagtas – PITX via Monumento, Manila Pier	Balagtas; Metrolink Bus Corp. Terminal	↔	Bay City; Parañaque Integrated Terminal Exchange	MacArthur Highway; Rizal Avenue; 5th Avenue; C-3 Road; Radial Road 10; Mel Lopez Boulevard; Bonifacio Drive; Roxas Boulevard; Seaside Drive; Macapagal Boulevard	45.1 km (28.0 mi)	Balagtas, Bocaue, Caloocan, Malabon, Manila, Marilao, Meycauayan, Navotas, Parañaque, Pasay, Valenzuela	Originally Route 1: Monumento-Balagtas, Route 2: Monumento-PITX, Route 10: Cubao-Doroteo Jose, and a pre-pandemic Malanday-NAIA via EDSA route Most units currently terminate at 5th Avenue.
36	Fairview – Alabang via Commonwealth, BGC	Novaliches; Robinsons Novaliches	↔	Alabang; Vista Terminal Exchange	All trips: Mindanao Avenue; Commonwealth Avenue; Tandang Sora Avenue; Katipunan Avenue; Bonny Serrano Avenue; Eulogio Rodriguez Jr. Avenue; Carlos P. Garcia Avenue; South Luzon Expressway; Manila South Road; Northbound trips: East Service Road; Regalado Highway; Southbound trips: Belfast Street	45.9 km (28.5 mi)	Muntinlupa, Pasig, Quezon City, Taguig	Originally a pre-pandemic SM Fairview-Alabang via EDSA, Commonwealth route. Buses terminate at Market! Market!.
37	Fairview – Monumento via Malinta	Novaliches; Robinsons Novaliches	↔	Caloocan; Monumento	Rizal Avenue Extension; 5th Avenue; Andres Bonifacio Avenue; North Luzon Expressway; Bagbaguin Road; General Luis Street; Quirino Highway	19.6 km (12.2 mi)	Caloocan, Quezon City, Valenzuela	Originally Route 3: Monumento-VGC. Buses still terminate at VGC.
38	Fairview – Pacita via Commonwealth, Quiapo, Ayala	Novaliches; SM City Fairview	↔	San Pedro; Pacita Complex	All trips: Quirino Highway; Mindanao Avenue; Commonwealth Avenue; Elliptical Road; Quezon Avenue; España Boulevard; Lerma Street; Quezon Boulevard; Padre Burgos Avenue; Taft Avenue; Quirino Avenue; Osmeña Highway; South Luzon Expressway; Susana Heights Access Road; Manila South Road; Northbound trips: Ayala Boulevard; San Marcelino Street	57.4 km (35.7 mi)	Makati, Manila, Muntinlupa, Quezon City, San Pedro	Originally a pre-pandemic Novaliches-Pacita Complex via EDSA, Mindanao Avenue route Buses terminate at One Ayala, Gil Puyat Avenue or Lawton.
39	Fairview – Pacita via Commonwealth, Katipunan, BGC	Novaliches; SM City Fairview	↔	San Pedro; Pacita Complex	All trips: Mindanao Avenue; Commonwealth Avenue; Tandang Sora Avenue; Katipunan Avenue; Bonny Serrano Avenue; Eulogio Rodriguez Jr. Avenue; Carlos P. Garcia Avenue; South Luzon Expressway; Manila South Road; Susana Heights Access Road; Pacita Avenue; Northbound trips: Regalado Highway; Southbound trips: Belfast Street	55.7 km (34.6 mi) (northbound); 57 km (35 mi) (southbound)	Muntinlupa, Pasig, Quezon City, San Pedro, Taguig	Originally a pre-pandemic SM Fairview-Pacita Complex via EDSA, Commonwealth route. Buses terminate at Market! Market!.
40	Fairview – Alabang via Commonwealth, Quiapo, Ayala	Novaliches; Robinsons Novaliches	↔	Alabang; Vista Terminal Exchange	All trips: Quirino Highway; North Luzon Expressway; Andres Bonifacio Avenue; Blumentritt Road; Dimasalang Street; Laon Laan Road; A. Mendoza Street; Quezon Boulevard; Padre Burgos Avenue; Taft Avenue; Gil Puyat Avenue; Ayala Avenue; EDSA; South Luzon Expressway; Manila South Road; Northbound trips: Retiro Street; East Service Road; Southbound trips: Aurora Boulevard; Ayala Boulevard; San Marcelino Street	47.3 km (29.4 mi)	Makati, Manila, Muntinlupa, Pasay, Parañaque, Quezon City	Originally a pre-pandemic Novaliches-Alabang via EDSA, Mindanao Avenue route. Most units still terminate at One Ayala, Gil Puyat Avenue or Lawton. Malanday Metrolink, an operator at this route, operates via Commonwealth Avenue and Quezon Avenue, instead of Quirino Highway and A. Bonifacio.
41	Fairview – FTI via Commonwealth, BGC	Novaliches; Robinsons Novaliches	↔	Western Bicutan; Arca South	All trips: Quirino Highway; Mindanao Avenue; Commonwealth Avenue; Tandang Sora Avenue; Katipunan Avenue; Bonny Serrano Avenue; Eulogio Rodriguez Jr. Avenue; Carlos P. Garcia Avenue; East Service Road; Arca Boulevard; Northbound trips: Regalado Highway; Southbound trips: Belfast Street	36.8 km (22.9 mi)	Pasig, Quezon City, Taguig	Originally a pre-pandemic SM Fairview-FTI Complex via EDSA route
42	Malanday – Ayala via Monumento, Quiapo	Malanday; Malanday Transport Terminal	↔	Makati CBD; One Ayala	All trips: MacArthur Highway; Rizal Avenue; Aurora Boulevard; Blumentritt Road; Dimasalang Road; Laong-Laan Road; A. Mendoza Street; Quezon Boulevard; Padre Burgos Avenue; Taft Avenue; Gil Puyat Avenue; Northbound trips: Carriedo Street; Southbound trips: Ronquillo Street; Plaza Santa Cruz Road	24.4 km (15.2 mi)	Caloocan, Makati, Malabon, Manila, Pasay, Valenzuela	Originally Route 17: Monumento-EDSA Taft, and pre-pandemic Malanday-Baclaran via EDSA Ayala Avenue route Gil Puyat Avenue acts as a semi-terminus, with most buses turning back south, instead of proceeding to Malanday, or making separate Malanday-LRT Buendia and LRT Buendia-Ayala Loop trips. Also serves as augmentation for LRT Line 1. There are certain instances that the route may be extended to SM Mall of Asia.
43	PITX – NAIA	Bay City; Parañaque Integrated Terminal Exchange	↔	Ninoy Aquino International Airport	Macapagal Boulevard; Seaside Drive; NAIA Road; Ninoy Aquino Avenue; Domestic Road; Andrews Avenue	9.1 km (5.7 mi)	Parañaque, Pasay	Originally Route 18, but still focuses on the same route
44	Alabang – Buendia via Ayala	Pasay; Gil Puyat station	↔	Alabang; Vista Terminal Exchange	Gil Puyat Avenue; Ayala Avenue; EDSA; South Luzon Expressway; Manila South Road; Northbound trips: Ayala Avenue; Malugay Street; Zuellig Loop	17.8 km (11.1 mi)	Manila, Muntinlupa, Navotas, Parañaque, Pasay,	Originally Route 2: Monumento-PITX, and a pre-pandemic Navotas-Alabang via EDSA route
45	FTI – Buendia via Ayala	Pasay; Gil Puyat station	↔	Western Bicutan; Arca South	All trips: Gil Puyat Avenue; EDSA; South Luzon Expressway; Lawton Avenue; East Service Road; Arca Boulevard; Northbound trips: Ayala Avenue; Malugay Street; Zuellig Loop	10.2 km (6.3 mi)	Makati, Manila, Navotas, Pasay, Taguig	Originally Route 16: Ayala-FTI Complex, and pre-pandemic Navotas-FTI Complex via EDSA route. Most buses terminate at One Ayala or Gil Puyat Avenue.
46	Pacita – Buendia via Ayala	Pasay; Gil Puyat station	↔	San Pedro; Pacita Complex	All trips: Gil Puyat Avenue; EDSA; South Luzon Expressway; Susana Heights Access Road; Manila South Road; Pacita Avenue; Northbound trips: Ayala Avenue; Malugay Street; Zuellig Loop	24.8 km (15.4 mi)	Makati, Manila, Muntinlupa, Navotas, Pasay, San Pedro	Originally Route 2: Monumento-PITX, and pre-pandemic Navotas-Pacita Complex via EDSA route. Buses terminate at One Ayala or Gil Puyat Avenue. Route 46 was initially via Alabang-Zapote Road, but was revised into via Ayala Avenue.
47	Monumento – PITX via Manila Pier	Caloocan; Monumento	↔	Bay City; Parañaque Integrated Terminal Exchange	Samson Road; C-4 Road; R-10 Road; Mel Lopez Boulevard; Bonifacio Drive; Roxas Boulevard; Seaside Drive; Macapagal Boulevard	22.2 km (13.8 mi)	Manila, Navotas, Parañaque, Pasay,	Originally Route 2: Monumento-PITX, but still focuses on the same route
48	Pacita – Lawton via Magallanes	San Pedro; Pacita Complex	↔	Ermita; Lawton	Manila South Road; Susana Heights Access Road; South Luzon Expressway; Osmeña Highway; Gil Puyat Avenue; Taft Avenue; Padre Burgos Avenue	36.9 km (22.9 mi)	Makati, Manila, Muntinlupa, Pasay, San Pedro	Originally a pre-pandemic route. Some buses terminate at One Ayala or Gil Puyat Avenue.
49	SJDM – PITX via Commonwealth, Quiapo	San Jose del Monte; Starmall San Jose del Monte	↔	Bay City; Parañaque Integrated Terminal Exchange	All trips: Quirino Highway; Mindanao Avenue; Commonwealth Avenue; Elliptical Road; Quezon Avenue; España Boulevard; Lerma Street; Quezon Boulevard; Padre Burgos Avenue; Taft Avenue; Gil Puyat Avenue; Roxas Boulevard; Macapagal Boulevard; Northbound trips: Seaside Drive; Regalado Highway; Southbound trips: Belfast Street; EDSA; Globe Rotonda	46.8 km (29.1 mi)	Caloocan, Manila, Parañaque, Pasay, Quezon City, San Jose del Monte	Originally Route 5: Quezon Ave-Angat, Route 6: Quezon Ave-EDSA Taft, and pre-pandemic Grotto-NAIA, SJDM-NAIA, and Norzagaray-NAIA routes. Buses terminate at Eton Centris, Gil Puyat Avenue, or PITX.
50	VGC – Alabang via Katipunan, BGC	Valenzuela; Valenzuela Gateway Complex	↔	Alabang; Vista Terminal Exchange	All trips: North Luzon Expressway; Mindanao Avenue; Congressional Avenue; Luzon Avenue; Tandang Sora Avenue; Katipunan Avenue; Bonny Serrano Avenue; Eulogio Rodriguez Jr. Avenue; Carlos P. Garcia Avenue; South Luzon Expressway; Manila South Road; Northbound trips: East Service Road	45.3 km (28.1 mi)	Muntinlupa, Pasig, Quezon City, Taguig, Valenzuela	Originally pre-pandemic Malanday-Alabang via EDSA and Novaliches-Alabang via EDSA Malinta Exit routes
51	VGC – Cubao via Katipunan	Valenzuela; Valenzuela Gateway Complex	↔	Araneta City; Farmers Plaza	North Luzon Expressway; Mindanao Avenue; Congressional Avenue; Luzon Avenue; Tandang Sora Avenue; Katipunan Avenue; P. Tuazon Boulevard; EDSA; Aurora Boulevard	15.2 km (9.4 mi)	Quezon City, Valenzuela	Originally Route 32: North EDSA-VGC, and Route 38: NLET-Cubao. Most buses still terminate at SM North EDSA Route modified to VGC-DSWD Batasan under the Love Bus program.
52	VGC – PITX via Balintawak, Quiapo	Valenzuela; Valenzuela Gateway Complex	↔	Bay City; Parañaque Integrated Terminal Exchange	North Luzon Expressway; Andres Bonifacio Avenue; Blumentritt Road; Dimasalang Street; Laong Laan Road; Andalucia Street; Quezon Boulevard; Padre Burgos Avenue; Roxas Boulevard; EDSA; Macapagal Boulevard	30.6 km (19.0 mi)	Manila, Parañaque, Pasay, Quezon City, Valenzuela	Originally Route 39: NLET-PITX, and a pre-pandemic Malanday-Baclaran via EDSA route Route 52 was initially via R-10 and Roxas Boulevard but was revised into via A. Bonifacio and Quezon Boulevard. Route also operates under the Love Bus program.
53	Cubao – Pacita via Quiapo, Magallanes	Araneta City; Farmers Plaza	↔	San Pedro; Pacita Complex	All trips: Times Square Avenue; Aurora Boulevard; E. Rodriguez Sr. Avenue; España Boulevard; Lerma Street; Quezon Boulevard; Padre Burgos Avenue; Taft Avenue; Quirino Avenue; Osmeña Highway; South Luzon Expressway; Susana Heights Access Road; Manila South Road; Northbound trips: D. Tuazon Street; Southbound trips: General Aguinaldo Avenue; General MacArthur Avenue	44.4 km (27.6 mi)	Makati, Manila, Muntinlupa, Quezon City, San Pedro	Originally a pre-pandemic route
54	Quiapo – Pandacan	Quiapo; Carriedo station	↔	Pandacan; Pandacan Transport Terminal	All trips: Carlos Palanca Street; Ayala Boulevard; United Nations Avenue; Paz Mendoza Guazon Street; Jesus Street; Palumpong Street; Beata Street; Lorenzo De La Paz Street; Northbound trips: Romualdez Street; Padre Burgos Avenue; Southbound trips: Natividad Lopez Street; San Marcelino Street	12.8 km (8.0 mi)	Manila	Originally a pre-pandemic Pandacan – Quiapo via C. Palanca route. Initially revised to Navotas - Pandacan, but was reverted to its original route and changed its denomination into a Modern PUJ.
55	Lancaster – PITX	General Trias; Lancaster New City	↔	Bay City; Parañaque Integrated Terminal Exchange	Advincula Avenue; Antero Soriano Highway; Covelandia Road; Manila–Cavite Expressway; Pacific Avenue; Macapagal Boulevard	19.9 km (12.4 mi)	General Trias, Imus, Kawit, Parañaque	Originally a point-to-point bus route
56	Antipolo – BGC via Ortigas	Antipolo; Robinsons Antipolo	↔	Bonifacio Global City; Venice Grand Canal Mall	Sumulong Highway; Marcos Highway; FVR Road; Eulogio Rodriguez Jr. Avenue; Carlos P. Garcia Avenue; Upper McKinley Road	26.9 km (16.7 mi)	Antipolo, Cainta, Marikina, Pasig, Quezon City, Taguig	
57	Antipolo – BGC via Bicutan, Taytay	Antipolo; Robinsons Antipolo	↔	Bonifacio Global City; Venice Grand Canal Mall	L. Sumulong Memorial Circle; Ortigas Avenue Extension; Taytay Diversion Road; Highway 2000; Ejercito Avenue; C-6 Road; General Santos Avenue; South Luzon Expressway; Carlos P. Garcia Avenue; Upper McKinley Road	30.6 km (19.0 mi)	Antipolo, Parañaque, Pasig, Taguig, Taytay	
58	Alabang – Naic via Carmona, Pala-Pala	Alabang; Vista Terminal Exchange	↔	Naic; Naic Grand Central Terminal	South Luzon Expressway; Governor's Drive; Antero Soriano Highway	50.0 km (31.1 mi)	Carmona, Dasmariñas, General Mariano Alvarez, General Trias, Muntinlupa, Naic, Silang, Tanza, Trece Martires	
59	Dasmariñas – Cubao via Carmona, Alabang, BGC	Dasmariñas; Robinsons Dasmariñas	↔	Araneta City; Farmers Plaza	Times Square Avenue; P. Tuazon Boulevard; 20th Avenue; Bonny Serrano Avenue; Eulogio Rodriguez Jr. Avenue; Carlos P. Garcia Avenue; South Luzon Expressway; Governor's Drive	56.2 km (34.9 mi)	Carmona, Dasmariñas, General Mariano Alvarez, Muntinlupa, Pasig, Quezon City, Taguig	Originally a provincial bus route. There are certain bus trips, particularly in the evening, that drop-off further west in FCIE.
60	BGC – Southwoods	Bonifacio Global City; Venice Grand Canal Mall	↔	Biñan; Southwoods Mall	Upper McKinley Road; Carlos P. Garcia Avenue; South Luzon Expressway; Southwoods Avenue	27.5 km (17.1 mi)	Biñan, Taguig	
61	Ayala – Southwoods	Makati CBD; One Ayala	↔	Biñan; Southwoods Mall	All trips: EDSA; Gil Puyat Avenue; South Luzon Expressway; Southwoods Avenue; Ecocentrum Avenue; Northbound trips: Osmeña Highway; Gil Puyat Avenue; Ayala Avenue	30.2 km (18.8 mi) (northbound); 26.4 km (16.4 mi) (southbound)	Biñan, Makati	
62	Buendia – FTI via BGC	Pasay; Gil Puyat station	↔	Western Bicutan; Arca South	Taft Avenue; Gil Puyat Avenue; Ayala Avenue; McKinley Road; 5th Avenue; 26th Street; Carlos P. Garcia Avenue; South Luzon Expressway; East Service Road; Arca Boulevard	15.3 km (9.5 mi)	Makati, Pasay, Taguig	Originally Arca South-BGC route of BGC Bus which remains operational, but does not terminate at Gil Puyat Avenue.
63	Ayala – BGC	Makati CBD; RCBC Plaza	↔	Bonifacio Global City; Market! Market!	Northbound trips: 26th Street; 5th Avenue; McKinley Road; Ayala Avenue; Southbound trips: Gil Puyat Avenue; Kalayaan Flyover; 32nd Street	10.9 km (6.8 mi)	Makati, Taguig	Originally pre-pandemic Ayala Express and East Express routes of BGC Bus. Most buses still terminate at EDSA-Ayala (McKinley Exchange Corporate Center) and/or Market! Market!, depending on the route.
64	Sta. Maria – North EDSA via Balintawak	Diliman; SM North EDSA	↔	Santa Maria; Caypombo	All trips: Norzagaray–Santa Maria Road; Santa Maria Bypass Road; Fortunato Halili Avenue; North Luzon Expressway; Andres Bonifacio Avenue; 5th Avenue; Sgt. Rivera Street; Gregorio Araneta Avenue; Quezon Avenue; Senator Miriam P. Defensor-Santiago Avenue; EDSA; Northbound trips: Congressional Avenue; Mindanao Avenue; Southbound trips: North Avenue	39.8 km (24.7 mi)	Bocaue, Caloocan, Quezon City, Santa Maria	Originally a pre-pandemic Sta. Maria-Santolan via EDSA route
65	Antipolo – PITX via C-5	Antipolo; Robinsons Antipolo	↔	Bay City; Parañaque Integrated Terminal Exchange	L. Sumulong Memorial Circle; Corazon C. Aquino Avenue; Ortigas Avenue Extension; Eulogio Rodriguez Jr. Avenue; Carlos P. Garcia Avenue; Upper McKinley Road; Park Avenue; Campus Avenue; Turin Street; Venezia Drive; Lawton Avenue; Sales Road; Andrews Avenue; Domestic Road; NAIA Road; Seaside Drive; Macapagal Boulevard	30.0 km (18.6 mi)	Antipolo, Cainta, Parañaque, Pasay, Pasig, Taguig, Taytay	
66	Antipolo – PITX via C-6	Antipolo; Robinsons Antipolo	↔	Bay City; Parañaque Integrated Terminal Exchange	L. Sumulong Memorial Circle; Corazon C. Aquino Avenue; Taytay Diversion Road; Rizal Avenue; Market Road (Westbound); Don Hilario Cruz Avenue (Eastbound); Sitio Malabon Road (Eastbound); Highway 2000; Ejercito Avenue; Sampaguita Street; Circumferential Road 6 General Santos Avenue; East Service Road; Arca Boulevard; East Service Road; Sales Road; Andrews Avenue; Domestic Road; NAIA Road; Seaside Drive; Macapagal Boulevard	35.2 km (21.9 mi)	Antipolo, Parañaque, Pasay, Pasig, Taguig, Taytay	Originally Route 57: Antipolo-BGC via C6. Route modified and awarded to new operator. New operator Malanday Metrolink will reuse buses from closed down Routes 40: Fairview (Nova Stop) – Alabang via Ayala Avenue and 41:Fairview Robinson – FTI via C5. Buses enter the Arca South Terminal to pick-up and drop-off passengers
Routes in italics are either proposed or have been closed.

==== PNR augmentation service ====
In 2023, following the closure of PNR Metro Commuter Line services in Metro Manila to make way for the construction of the North–South Commuter Railway, the LTFRB and Philippine National Railways has introduced three augmentation routes serving the affected stations, two of which are bus routes. These two bus routes have not been assigned a bus number and are only referred to as Route 1 and Route 2.

Route		Terminals			Route Structure	Length	Service area	Notes
1	FTI – Divisoria via Magallanes	Western Bicutan; Arca South	↔	Tondo; Divisoria	All trips: Mayhaligue Street; Abad Santos Avenue; Tayuman Street; Rizal Avenue; Blumentritt Road; España Boulevard; Lacson Avenue; Mabini Flyover; Quirino Avenue; Osmeña Highway; East Service Road; Arca Boulevard; Northbound trips: Earnshaw Street; Southbound trips: Aurora Boulevard; Retiro Street; Nagtahan Flyover; Lawton Avenue	19.9 km (12.4 mi)	Makati, Manila, Taguig	Augmentation for the Tutuban–FTI route of the PNR Metro Commuter Line
2	Alabang – Divisoria via Magallanes	Alabang; Vista Terminal Exchange	↔	Tondo; Divisoria	All trips: Manila South Road; South Luzon Expressway; Osmeña Highway; Quirino Avenue; Nagtahan Street; Legarda Street; Recto Avenue; Abad Santos Avenue; Northbound trips: East Service Road	26.4 km (16.4 mi)	Makati, Manila, Muntinlupa, Parañaque	Augmentation for the Tutuban–Alabang route of the PNR Metro Commuter Line
Routes in italics are either proposed or have been closed.

=== Express service ===
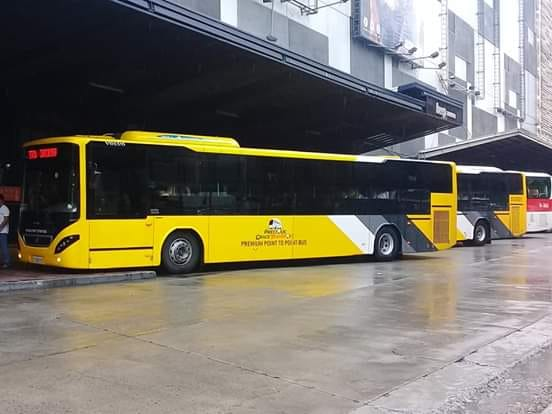
Premium P2P buses at the Trinoma terminal

Launched in March 2015, the Premium Point-to-Point (P2P) Bus Service, formerly known as Express Connect, is an express bus service connecting the suburbs to the central business districts and the international gateways. It initially operated between Quezon City and Makati, with a third route to SM Mall of Asia in Pasay. A third P2P service was introduced in April 2016 connecting Greenbelt in Makati and Alabang Town Center in Muntinlupa operated by RRCG Transport.

Route	Terminals			via	Operator
—	Alabang; Vista Terminal Exchange	↔	Batangas City; Batangas International Port	Batangas City; Batangas City Grand Terminal (northbound pick-up & southbound drop-off)	ALPS The Bus, Inc.
—	Alabang; Vista Terminal Exchange	↔	Lipa; SM City Lipa		ALPS The Bus, Inc.
—	Bay City; Parañaque Integrated Terminal Exchange	↔	Baguio; SM City Baguio		Pangasinan Solid North Transit, Inc.
—	Bay City; Parañaque Integrated Terminal Exchange	↔	Batangas City; Batangas International Port	Batangas City; Batangas City Grand Terminal (northbound pick-up & southbound drop-off)	ALPS The Bus, Inc.
—	Bay City; Parañaque Integrated Terminal Exchange	↔	Lipa; SM City Lipa		ALPS The Bus, Inc.
—	Bay City; Parañaque Integrated Terminal Exchange	↔	San Juan; ALPS Terminal	Turbina; Turbina Bus Terminal	ALPS The Bus, Inc.
—	Bonifacio Global City; Market! Market!	↔	Ayala Alabang; Alabang Town Center		HM Transport, Inc.
—	Bonifacio Global City; Market! Market!	↔	Calamba; Calamba Crossing		Saint Rose Transit, Inc.
—	Bonifacio Global City; Market! Market!	↔	Santa Rosa; Nuvali		HM Transport, Inc.
—	Diliman; Trinoma	↔	Balagtas; San Juan		Riding Public First Joint Venture, Inc.
—	Diliman; Trinoma	↔	Bocaue; Turo		Riding Public First Joint Venture, Inc.
—	Diliman; Trinoma	↔	Clark International Airport	Clark; SM City Clark	Genesis Transport Service, Inc.
—	Diliman; Trinoma	↔	Malolos; Robinsons Malolos		Precious Grace Transport Services
—	Diliman; Trinoma	↔	Pandi; Mapulang Lupa		Riding Public First Joint Venture, Inc.
—	Diliman; SM North EDSA	↔	Plaridel; Primark Town Center Plaridel		Riding Public First Joint Venture, Inc.
—	Diliman; Trinoma	↔	Santa Maria; Caypombo		Precious Grace Transport Services
—	Diliman; Trinoma	↔	Santa Maria; Santa Clara		Precious Grace Transport Services
—	Ermita; Robinsons Manila	↔	Alabang; Vista Terminal Exchange		N Dela Rosa Liner
—	Ermita; Lawton	↔	Calamba; Calamba Crossing	Calamba; Paciano Rizal (northbound pick-up and alternative southbound route)	Saint Rose Transit, Inc.
—	Greenhills; Greenhills Mall	↔	Ayala Alabang; Alabang Town Center		RRCG Transport System Co. Inc.
—	Makati CBD; One Ayala	↔	Las Piñas; Robinsons Las Piñas		San Agustin Transport, Corp.
—	Makati; Circuit Makati	↔	Santa Rosa; Nuvali	Makati CBD; Robinsons Summit Center (northbound drop-off); One Ayala (northbound drop-off & southbound pick-up); Santa Rosa; Laguna BelAir (northbound pick-up & southbound drop-off)	TAS Trans, Corp.
—	Makati CBD; Greenbelt 5	↔	Alabang; South Park Center		RRCG Transport System Co. Inc.
—	Makati CBD; One Ayala	↔	Antipolo; SM City Masinag	Antipolo; Robinsons Antipolo (special eastbound drop-off); Pasig; Ayala Malls Feliz (eastbound drop-off and westbound pick-up); Makati CBD; Rustan's Makati (special westbound drop-off); Robinsons Summit Center (special westbound drop-off); RCBC Plaza (special westbound drop-off)	RRCG Transport System Co. Inc.
—	Makati CBD; Greenbelt 5	↔	Ayala Alabang; Alabang Town Center		RRCG Transport System Co. Inc.
—	Makati CBD; One Ayala	↔	Bacoor; NOMO – A Vista Lifestyle Center	Bacoor; Talaba (pick-up); Makati CBD; Robinsons Summit Center (northbound drop-off); Makati; Circuit Makati (northbound drop-off)	MetroExpress Connect, Inc.
—	Makati CBD; One Ayala	↔	Bacoor; SOMO – A Vista Mall	Las Piñas; Evia Lifestyle Center (southbound drop-off); Makati CBD; Robinsons Summit Center (northbound drop-off); Makati; Circuit Makati (northbound drop-off)	MetroExpress Connect, Inc.
— (Note: Combination of the Makati–Alabang (Greenbelt 5 to South Park) P2P route and the Batangas (Starmall Alabang/Vista Terminal Exchange to Batangas Port) route)	Makati CBD; Greenbelt 5	→	Batangas City; Batangas International Port	Alabang; South Park Center (drop-off); Vista Terminal Exchange (pick-up and drop-off); Batangas City; Batangas City Grand Terminal (drop-off)	RRCG Transport System Co. Inc.
—	Makati CBD; Greenbelt 5	→	Lipa; SM City Lipa	Alabang; South Park Center (drop-off); Vista Terminal Exchange (pick-up)	RRCG Transport System Co. Inc.
—	Makati CBD; One Ayala	↔	Cainta; Sierra Valley		RRCG Transport System Co. Inc.
—	Makati CBD; One Ayala	↔	Calamba; Calamba Crossing		Saint Rose Transit, Inc.
—	Makati CBD; One Ayala	↔	Dasmariñas; Robinsons Dasmariñas		MetroExpress Connect, Inc. -->
—	Makati CBD; One Ayala	↔	Imus; Lancaster New City		LNC Link, Inc.
—	Makati CBD; One Ayala	↔	Imus; The District Imus (Note: There are also Imus–Makati P2P bus trips, particularly in the evening, that drop-off further south in Dasmariñas.)	Makati CBD; The Landmark (northbound drop-off); Robinsons Summit Center (northbound drop-off); Makati; Circuit Makati (northbound drop-off)	San Agustin Transport, Corp.
—	Makati CBD; One Ayala	↔	Novaliches; Robinsons Novaliches		RRCG Transport System Co. Inc.
—	Makati CBD; One Ayala	↔	Noveleta; Puregold Noveleta	Kawit; Vista Mall Kawit (northbound pick-up); Imus; Lancaster New City (northbound pick-up); Makati; Circuit Makati (southbound pick-up)	San Agustin Transport, Corp.
—	Ninoy Aquino International Airport	↔	Alabang; South Park Center		UBE Express, Inc.
—	Ninoy Aquino International Airport	↔	Araneta City; Araneta City Bus Port		UBE Express, Inc.
—	Ninoy Aquino International Airport	↔	Bay City; Parañaque Integrated Terminal Exchange		UBE Express, Inc.
—	Ninoy Aquino International Airport; Terminal 3	↔	Clark International Airport	Clark; SM City Clark	Genesis Transport Services, Inc.
—	Ninoy Aquino International Airport	↔	Ermita; Robinsons Manila		UBE Express, Inc.
—	Ninoy Aquino International Airport	↔	Imus; The District Imus		UBE Express, Inc.
—	Ninoy Aquino International Airport	↔	Makati CBD; One Ayala		UBE Express, Inc.
—	Ninoy Aquino International Airport	↔	Pasay; Victory Liner Pasay Terminal		UBE Express, Inc.
—	Ninoy Aquino International Airport	↔	Santa Rosa; Robinsons Santa Rosa		UBE Express, Inc.
—	Ortigas Center; Starmall EDSA-Shaw	↔	Ayala Alabang; Alabang Town Center	Ortigas Center; SM Megamall (northbound drop-off); Robinsons Galleria (special northbound pick up & drop-off); South Station (southbound drop-off)	RRCG Transport System Co. Inc.
—	Ortigas Center; Starmall EDSA-Shaw	↔	Alabang; Vista Terminal Exchange	Ortigas Center; SM Megamall (northbound drop-off); Robinsons Galleria (special northbound pick up & drop-off); South Station (southbound drop-off)	RRCG Transport System Co. Inc.
— (Note: Combination of the EDSA-Shaw–Alabang (Starmall EDSA-Shaw to Starmall Alabang/Vista Terminal Exchange) P2P route and the Batangas (Starmall Alabang/Vista Terminal Exchange to Batangas Port) route)	Ortigas Center; Starmall EDSA-Shaw	→	Batangas City; Batangas International Port	Alabang; Vista Terminal Exchange (pick-up); Batangas City; Batangas City Grand Terminal (northbound pick-up & southbound drop-off)	RRCG Transport System Co. Inc.
—	Ortigas Center; Starmall EDSA-Shaw	→	Lipa; SM City Lipa	Alabang; Vista Terminal Exchange (pick-up)	RRCG Transport System Co. Inc.
—	Ortigas Center; SM Megamall	↔	Batangas City; Batangas International Port	Batangas City; Batangas City Grand Terminal (northbound pick-up & southbound drop-off) Ortigas Center; Robinsons Galleria (southbound pick-up)	ALPS The Bus, Inc.
—	Ortigas Center; SM Megamall	↔	Lipa; SM City Lipa	Ortigas Center; Robinsons Galleria	ALPS The Bus, Inc.

== BGC Bus ==
BGC Bus, a subsidiary of the Fort Bonifacio Development Corporation (FBDC) under Ayala Corporation, operates bus routes plying Bonifacio Global City, as well as the Makati Central Business District.

== Love Bus ==
In August 2025, the Marcos administration announced that it would revive the Love Bus, a premium bus service previously operated by the state-owned Metropolitan Manila Transit Corporation (MMTC). The revived service aims to offer free rides in Metro Manila, Metro Cebu, and Metro Davao.

Since September 2025, two routes have been launched in Metro Manila, which mainly connect the Valenzuela Gateway Complex to the cities of Manila, Pasay, and Quezon City. Both routes in Metro Manila are each served by a fleet of five 20-seater electric minibuses operated by the Department of Transportation and Global Electric Transportation (GET) Philippines. The two routes are free of charge throughout September. From October onwards, the service will remain free for senior citizens and persons with disabilities at all times and for other passengers during peak hours from 6:00 am to 9:00 am and 5:00 pm to 8:00 pm.

=== Routes ===
Route	Terminals			Route Structure
Valenzuela Gateway Complex – DSWD Batasan	Valenzuela; Valenzuela Gateway Complex	↔	Quezon City; Batasan Road	All trips: East Service Road; North Luzon Expressway; Mindanao Avenue Extension; Tandang Sora Avenue; Luzon Avenue; Commonwealth Avenue; Batasan Road; Eastbound trips: Katipunan Avenue
Valenzuela Gateway Complex – PITX	Valenzuela; Valenzuela Gateway Complex	↔	Bay City; Parañaque Integrated Terminal Exchange	All trips: East Service Road; North Luzon Expressway; NLEX Harbor Link; España Boulevard; Quezon Boulevard; Quezon Bridge; Padre Burgos Avenue; Roxas Boulevard; EDSA; Jose W. Diokno Boulevard; Coral Way; Macapagal Boulevard
Robinsons Galleria – Eastwood City	Quezon City; Robinsons Galleria	↔	Eastwood City; Eastwood Mall	All trips: Meralco Avenue; Julia Vargas Avenue; E. Rodriguez Jr. Avenue; Westbound trips: Park Drive; Central Avenue; Sapphire Road; Eastbound trips: Ortigas Avenue; Lanuza Avenue; Eastwood Avenue; Orchard Road

== Quezon City Bus Service ==
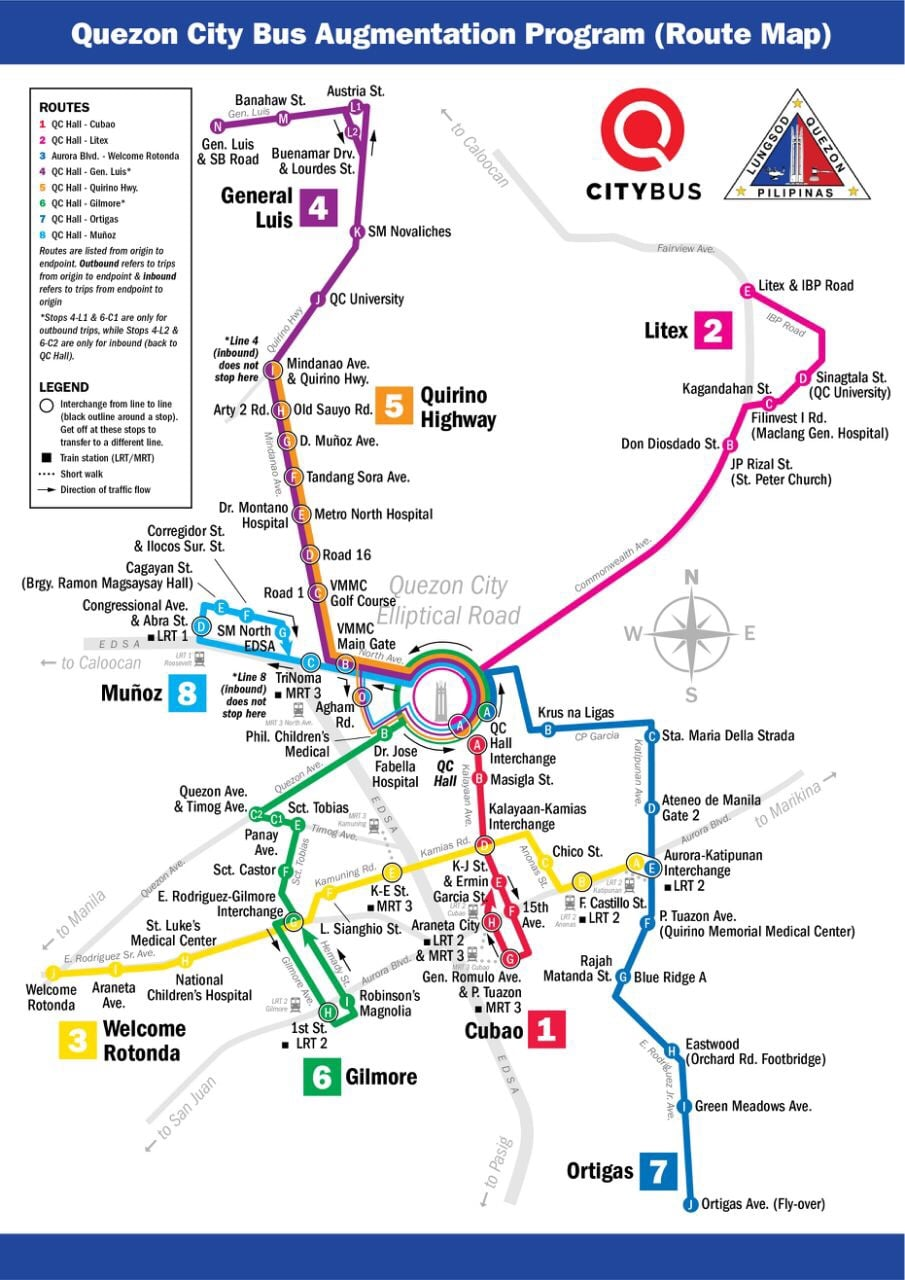
QCity Bus Service map as of December 2020.

In 2021, under the Quezon City Bus Augmentation Program, the Quezon City government began operating eight city-wide bus routes with the approval of the Land Transportation and Franchising Regulatory Board. The service is also referred to as City Bus and the QCity Bus Service. On June 24, 2022, Quezon City mayor Joy Belmonte announced that the city's bus services will continue to be offered for free amidst the return of onsite work and classes and high fuel prices. On April 28, 2023, the bus service was made permanent through Quezon City Ordinance No. SP-3184, series of 2023, or the "Q City Bus Ordinance", placing the program under the Quezon City Traffic and Transport Management Department.

As of May 2023, over 12 million passengers have been served by the city's bus services.

In June 2024, the Quezon City Government announced faster waiting intervals and expanded operating hours for its eight routes. In October 2024, eight electric low-floor buses were procured by the Quezon City government. Each bus has a seating capacity of 41 seats, wheelchair ramps, and onboard closed-circuit television cameras.

=== Routes ===
Route		Terminals			Route Structure
1	Quezon City Hall – Cubao	Elliptical Road; Quezon City Hall	↔	Araneta City; Ali Mall	All trips: Kalayaan Avenue; K-J Street; Ermin Garcia Avenue; General Romulo Avenue; Northbound trips: Yale Street; New York Avenue; Southbound trips: 15th Avenue; P. Tuazon Boulevard
2	Quezon City Hall – Litex	Elliptical Road; Quezon City Hall	↔	Commonwealth; Litex Market	All trips: Kalayaan Avenue; Elliptical Road; Commonwealth Avenue; Batasan Road
3	Welcome Rotonda – Katipunan	Welcome Rotonda	↔	Loyola Heights; Katipunan station	All trips: Aurora Boulevard; Anonas Street; Kamias Road; Kamuning Road; Tomas Morato Avenue; Eulogio Rodriguez Sr. Avenue
4	Quezon City Hall – General Luis	Elliptical Road; Quezon City Hall	↔	Novaliches; General Luis Street	All trips: North Avenue; Mindanao Avenue; Quirino Highway; General Luis Street
5	Quezon City Hall – Mindanao Avenue via Visayas Avenue	Elliptical Road; Quezon City Hall	↔	Talipapa; Quirino Highway	All trips: Kalayaan Avenue; Visayas Avenue; Tandang Sora Avenue; Mindanao Avenue
6	Quezon City Hall – Gilmore	Elliptical Road; Quezon City Hall	↔	New Manila; Robinsons Magnolia	All trips: Quezon Avenue; Timog Avenue; Boy Scout Circle; Tomas Morato Avenue; Scout Lozano Street; Scout Reyes Street; Scout Chuatoco Avenue; Doña Hemady Avenue; Eulogio Rodriguez Sr. Avenue; Southbound trips: N. Domingo Street; Gilmore Avenue
7	Quezon City Hall – Bridgetowne	Elliptical Road; Quezon City Hall	↔	Ugong Norte; Opus Mall	All trips: Kalayaan Avenue; Carlos P. Garcia Avenue; Katipunan Avenue; Eulogio Rodriguez Jr. Avenue; Westbound trips: Maginhawa Street; Eastbound trips: Commonwealth Avenue; University Avenue
8	Quezon City Hall – Muñoz	Elliptical Road; Quezon City Hall	↔	Bago Bantay; Fernando Poe Jr. station	All trips: Kalayaan Avenue; Elliptical Road; North Avenue; Mindanao Avenue; Congressional Avenue; Westbound trips: EDSA; Eastbound trips: EDSA; Mindanao Avenue; Senator Miriam P. Defensor-Santiago Avenue; Quezon Avenue

== Pasig Libreng Sakay ==
In 2016, the Pasig city government established the Pasig Bus Service to provide free public transportation within Ortigas Center. The service was initially launched with four routes that operated on weekdays during peak hours with a fleet of eight 25-seater minibuses.

In 2018, the Pasig Bus Service was expanded with four additional routes connecting various parts of the city with the Pasig City Hall and Pasig Mega Market. These routes were branded as the Pasig City Hall Shuttle Service, while the existing Ortigas Center routes were branded as the Pasig CBD Shuttle Service, consisting of north-south and a east-west loops serving the central business district.

In 2020, the Pasig Bus Service was rebranded as the city's Libreng Sakay (lit. 'Free Rides') program. The program would operate temporary routes for specific purposes and during disruptions to public transportation, including transport strikes.

In 2024, following the transfer of city government offices to a temporary city hall in Bridgetowne, a point-to-point shuttle service was launched between Caruncho Avenue and the temporary city hall.

In 2026, regular Libreng Sakay routes were reintroduced. The first route integrated the existing City Hall shuttle route and included three additional intracity routes with designated pick-up and drop-off routes and operates on weekdays except on holidays.

=== Routes ===
Route		Terminals			Route Structure	Notes
1	SPED to Temporary Pasig City Hall	SPED; Caruncho Avenue	↔	Temporary Pasig City Hall; E. Amang Rodriguez Avenue	All trips: Caruncho Avenue; Dr. Sixto Antonio Avenue; Ortigas Avenue; E. Amang Rodriguez Avenue; Northbound trips: C. Raymundo Avenue; Pasig Boulevard Extension; Bernal Street; Tramo Street; West Bank Road	Point-to-point service
2	SPED to Ligaya	SPED; Caruncho Avenue	↔	Puregold Ligaya; E. Amang Rodriguez Avenue	All trips: Caruncho Avenue; Dr. Sixto Antonio Avenue; Ortigas Avenue; E. Amang Rodriguez Avenue; Northbound trips: C. Raymundo Avenue; Pasig Boulevard Extension; Southbound trips: A. Mabini Street; Market Avenue	Designated stops only
3	SPED to One San Miguel Avenue	SPED; Caruncho Avenue	↔	One San Miguel Avenue; San Miguel Avenue	All trips: Caruncho Avenue; Market Avenue; Dr. Sixto Antonio Avenue; C. Raymundo Avenue; Pasig Boulevard Extension; Pasig Boulevard; Shaw Boulevard; Westbound trips: C. Raymundo Avenue; Eastbound trips: A. Mabini Street	Designated stops only
4	SPED to Nagpayong	SPED; Caruncho Avenue	↔	Nagpayong; Kenneth Road (Eusebio Avenue)	All trips: Caruncho Avenue; Urbano Velasco Avenue; Sandoval Avenue; Westbound trips: San Agustin Street	Designated stops only

== See also ==
- Transportation in Metro Manila
