= VGC =

VGC may refer to:

- Valenzuela Gateway Complex
- Video Graphics Controller
- Video Games Chronicle, a gaming website
- Flemish Community Commission (Vlaamse Gemeenschapscommissie)
- Volkswagen Group China
- Pokémon Video Game Championships, see Pokémon World Championships § Video Game Championships (VGC)
