= Valenzuela Gateway Complex =

Transit hub in Valenzuela, Philippines

Coordinates: 14°42′39″N 120°59′39″E

Valenzuela Gateway Complex Terminal Valenzuela Gateway Complex Central Integrated Terminal
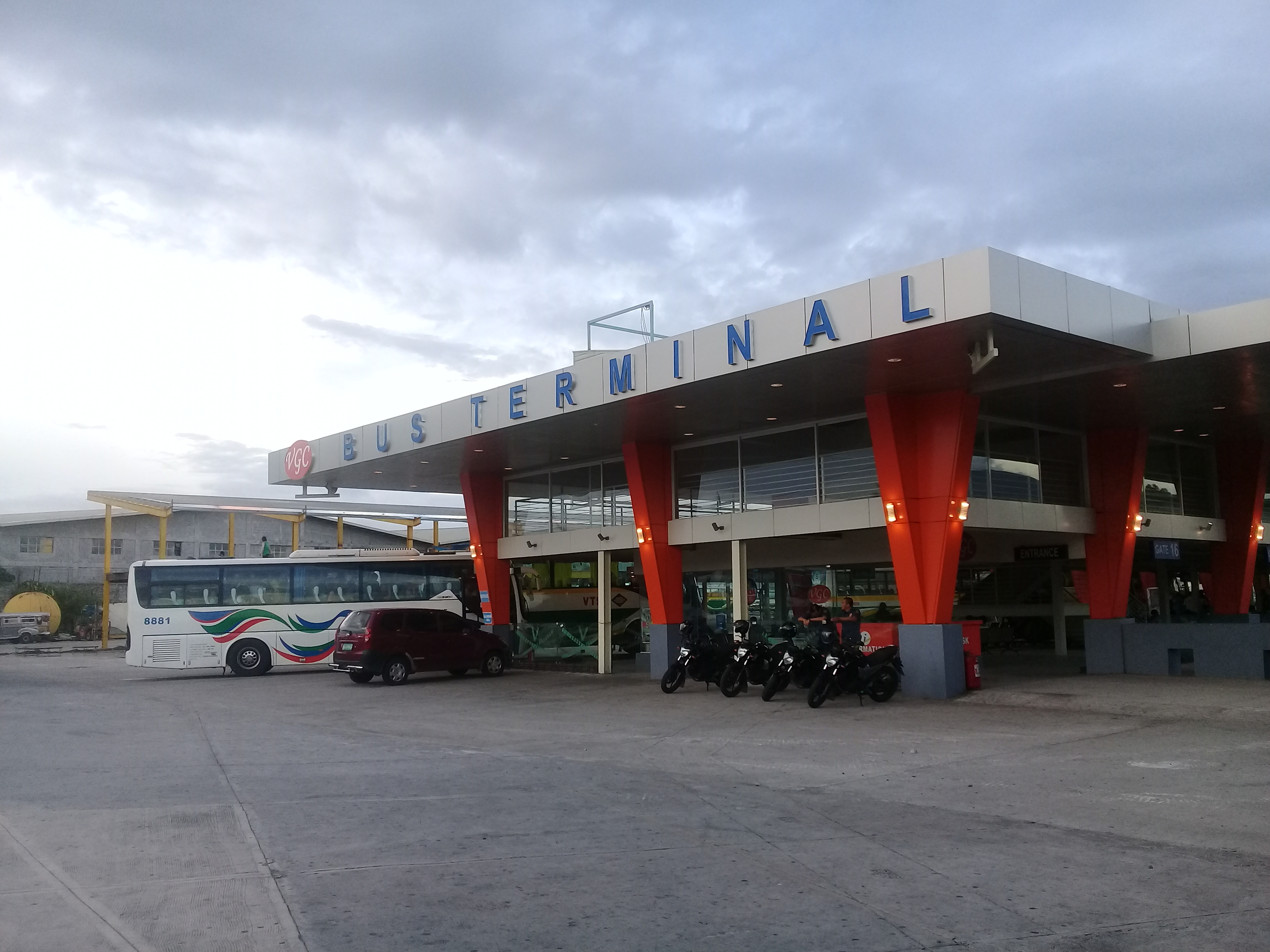
- The Valenzuela terminal in June 2019

General information
- Location: Paso de Blas, Valenzuela, Metro Manila; Philippines
- System: Intermodal
- Owner: Valenzuela Gateway Complex Corporation
- Bus routes: 50 51 52; 13 20 37 Paso De Blas
- Bus operators: Various Bus Operators
- Connections: Transfers to intercity and provincial buses, jeepneys, and UV Express

History
- Opened: August 15, 2018
Location

The Valenzuela Gateway Complex, also known as the Valenzuela Gateway Complex Terminal or Valenzuela Gateway Complex (VGC) Central Integrated Terminal, is an inter-regional intermodal transit hub in Valenzuela, Metro Manila, Philippines. It is planned to be one of three provincial bus stations serving Metro Manila and the main terminal for province-bound and incoming buses from the Central and Northern Luzon regions.

== Location ==
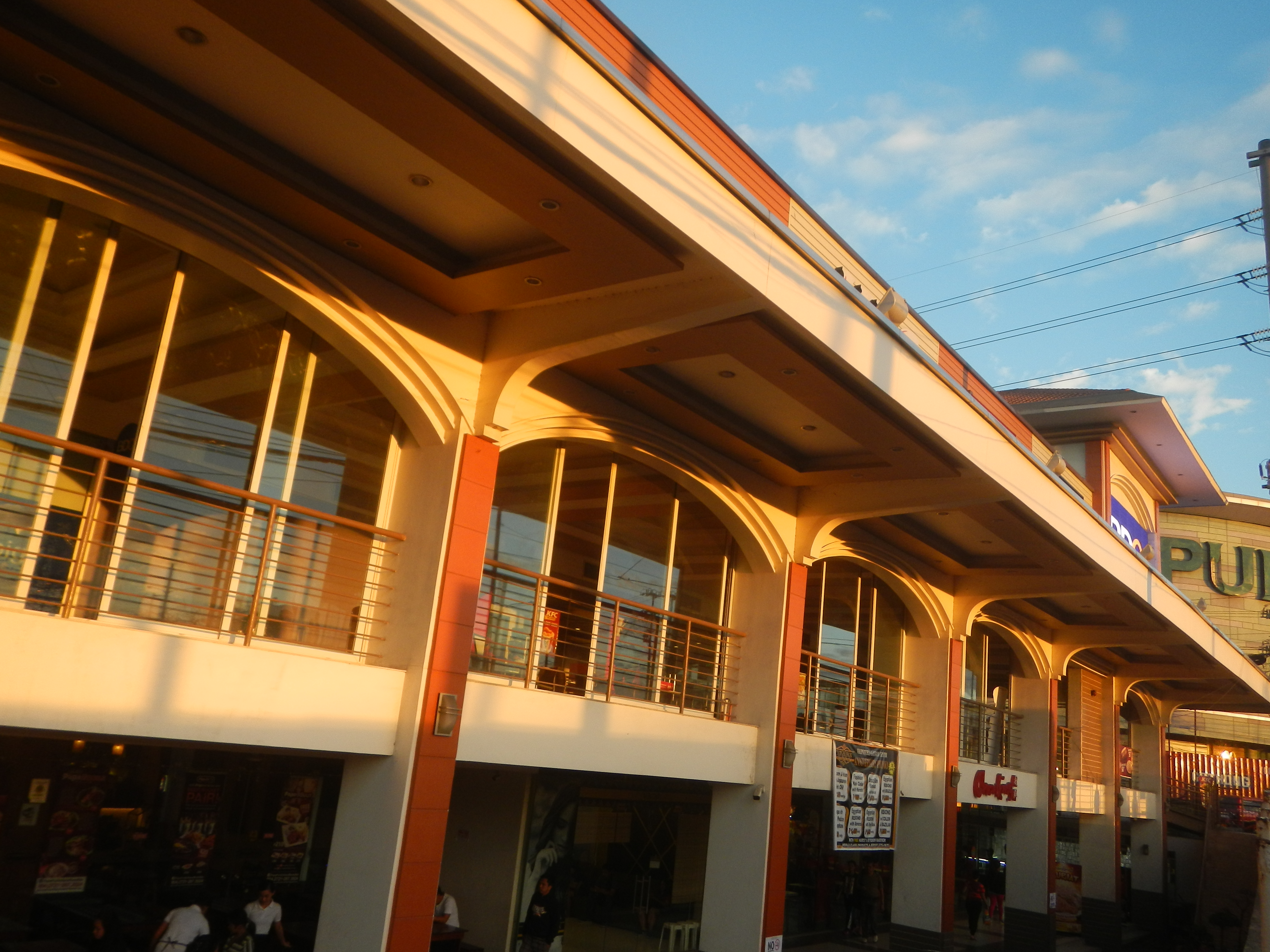
Valenzuela Gateway Complex in Paso de Blas, Valenzuela

The Valenzuela Gateway Complex Terminal is located on a 5-hectare (12-acre) site in Paso de Blas, east-central Valenzuela. It is situated alongside the East Service Road of the North Luzon Expressway, at its junction with Paso de Blas Road at the Paso de Blas (Valenzuela City) Interchange, and opposite Puregold Paso de Blas. Nearby landmarks include the Malinta Market and the 60-hectare (150-acre) former Plastic City manufacturing estate, which is being redeveloped by Ayala Land into a mixed-use urban complex.

== History ==
The Valenzuela terminal started its interim operation on August 15, 2018. A provincial bus ban on EDSA was announced earlier in the month, with the Metropolitan Manila Development Authority (MMDA) announcing that nine bus companies serving the provinces of Bataan, Bulacan, Pampanga, Zambales, Pangasinan, Baguio, Ilocos Sur, and Cagayan Valley, along with 1,954 buses, would be accommodated at the new terminal. The terminal is part of a traffic reduction plan by the MMDA, which aims to free up the busy highway of approximately 2,276 northbound provincial buses. The plan also includes the construction of two other provincial bus terminals in the southern part of the region for southbound provincial buses and the eventual closure of all 46 bus terminals along EDSA.

The ban on provincial buses along EDSA was deferred until the completion of certain facilities and infrastructure at the Valenzuela terminal. The House of Representatives of the Philippines also expressed its concern over the designation of the Valenzuela terminal as Metro Manila's northern terminal, citing its limited space, lack of infrastructure, and narrow streets, among other issues.

In March 2019, the MMDA announced the relocation of all provincial bus operators to the three designated provincial bus terminals, including Valenzuela, and the permanent closure of all EDSA bus terminals starting in June 2019.

== Services ==
VGC services the following routes:

=== Buses ===
- Mega Manila Consortium Corporation operates three bus routes of the rationalized bus transit, going to and from Alabang, Araneta City Cubao, and PITX, respectively. ES Transport, Inc operates buses going to and from SM North EDSA. and Central Luzon Routes.
- Buses passing through Bagong Silang, Monumento, Novaliches, Sapang Palay, and Santa Cruz also stop at this terminal.

=== Jeepneys ===
- Modern and traditional jeepneys operate routes to and from Monumento, Bocaue, Marilao,Santa Maria (Caypombo), TriNoma, and to PITX.

== See also ==
- Parañaque Integrated Terminal Exchange
