= Venice Grand Canal Mall =

Venice Grand Canal

- Location: Taguig, Metro Manila, Philippines
- Coordinates: 14°32′1″N 121°3′4″E
- Address: McKinley Hill Garden Villas, Cluster B, Upper McKinley Road, Pinagsama
- Opened: September 18, 2015; 11 years ago
- Developer: Megaworld Corporation
- Manager: Megaworld Lifestyle Malls
- Owner: McKinley
- Num. of anchor tenants: 2
- Floors: 3 upper + 1 basement
- Parking: 1,000
- Public transit: 4 18 61 Venice Grand Canal Mall
- Website: Official website

Venice Grand Canal, also known as Venice Grand Canal Mall, is a lifestyle mall development under Megaworld Lifestyle Malls located inside the 50-hectare (120-acre) McKinley Hill township of Megaworld Corporation in Taguig, Philippines.

The mall architecture is inspired by the Grand Canal in Venice, Italy. Megaworld consulted the Rome-based architectural firm Paolo Marioni Architetto for the mall's Italian-inspired architectural design. The mall has a replica of the Venetian grand canal with gondola ride tours available for visitors. The canal is 200 meters (660 ft) long and 15 meters (49 ft) wide. The gondolas are stationed underneath the Rialto Bridge replica.

The mall also has replicas of St Mark's Campanile in Piazza San Marco, the Rialto Bridge, and the Ponte de Amore Bridge, which includes an interactive love locks installation.

Venice Grand Canal has been described as the "most romantic mall" in the country. It was awarded the Best Retail Architectural Design during the 2017 Philippine Property Awards.

== Features ==
=== Amenities ===
Venice Grand Canal in 2026

The mall offers a diverse dining mix including Italian restaurants Ponte Amore and Toni and Sergio, along with international options like Tim Hortons and Mitsuyado Sei-Men.

Venice Grand Canal also hosts several shopping brands, a supermarket, lifestyle stores, a bookstore, services shops, novelty shops, and wellness and fitness centers. The country’s first Fundador Café can also be found at the mall.

Venice Grand Canal is a pet-friendly mall, hosting facilities and amenities tailored for pet owners through its Pet Pass system.

At the mall’s third level are Venice Cineplex (equipped with Dolby Atmos), an Ultra Cinema (with remote-operated high end twin seats), and a Roman Catholic chapel called St. Raphael the Archangel Chapel.

The mall also hosts events such as Venetian mimes, conciertos and the McKinley Hill Grand Christmas Parade.

=== Gondolas at Venice Grand Canal ===
Venice Grand Canal provides gondola rides for families and couples.

=== Venice Piazza ===
Venice Piazza is an open space in Venice Grand Canal inspired by Piazza San Marco in Venice, Italy. The space contains a replica of St Mark’s Tower. The Piazza offers pigeon feeding activities every late afternoon.

== Gallery ==
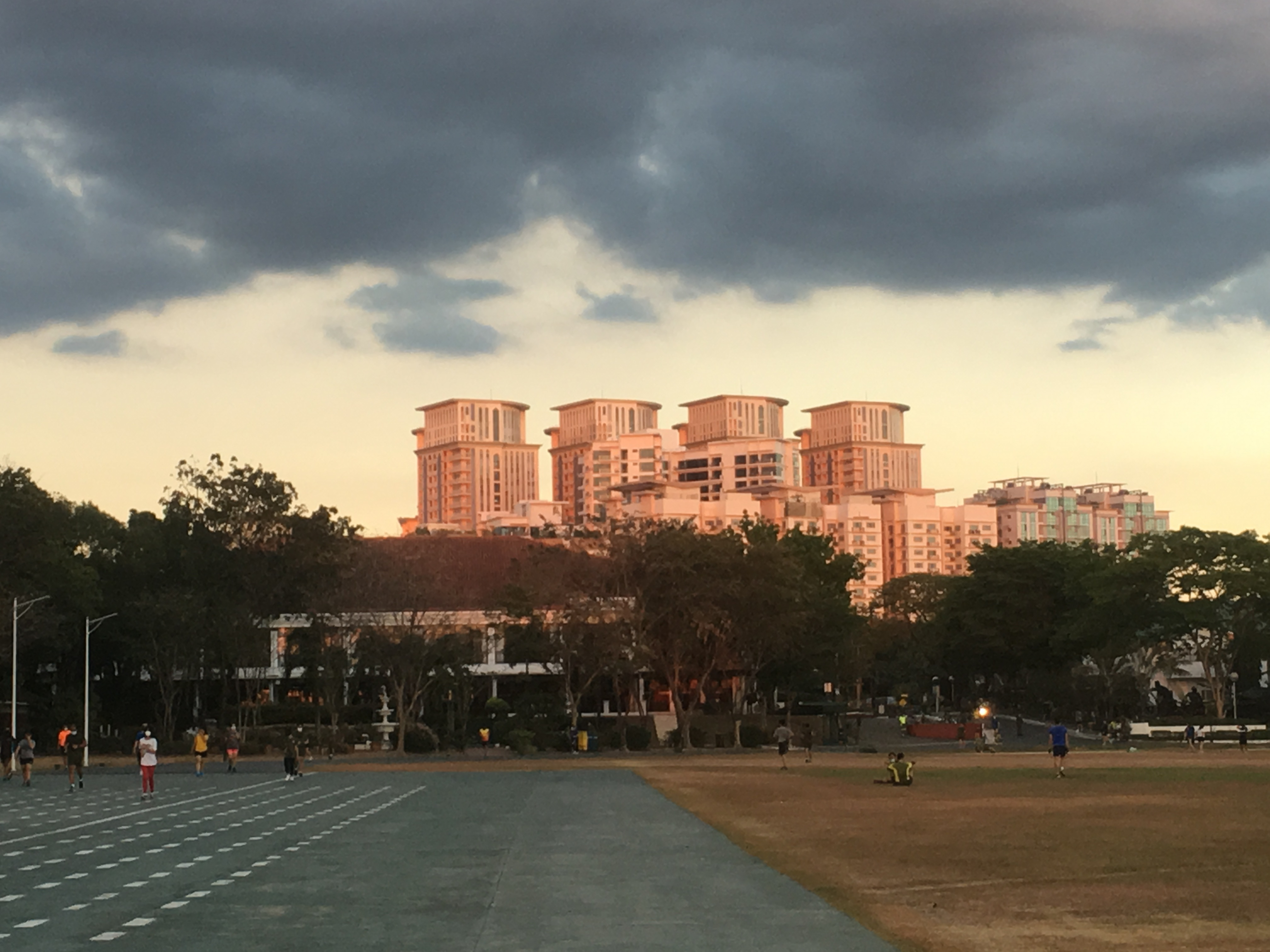
Façade of Venice Grand Canal visible along the grandstand of Philippine Army Headquarters (HPA)

Façade

The Rialto Bridge replica

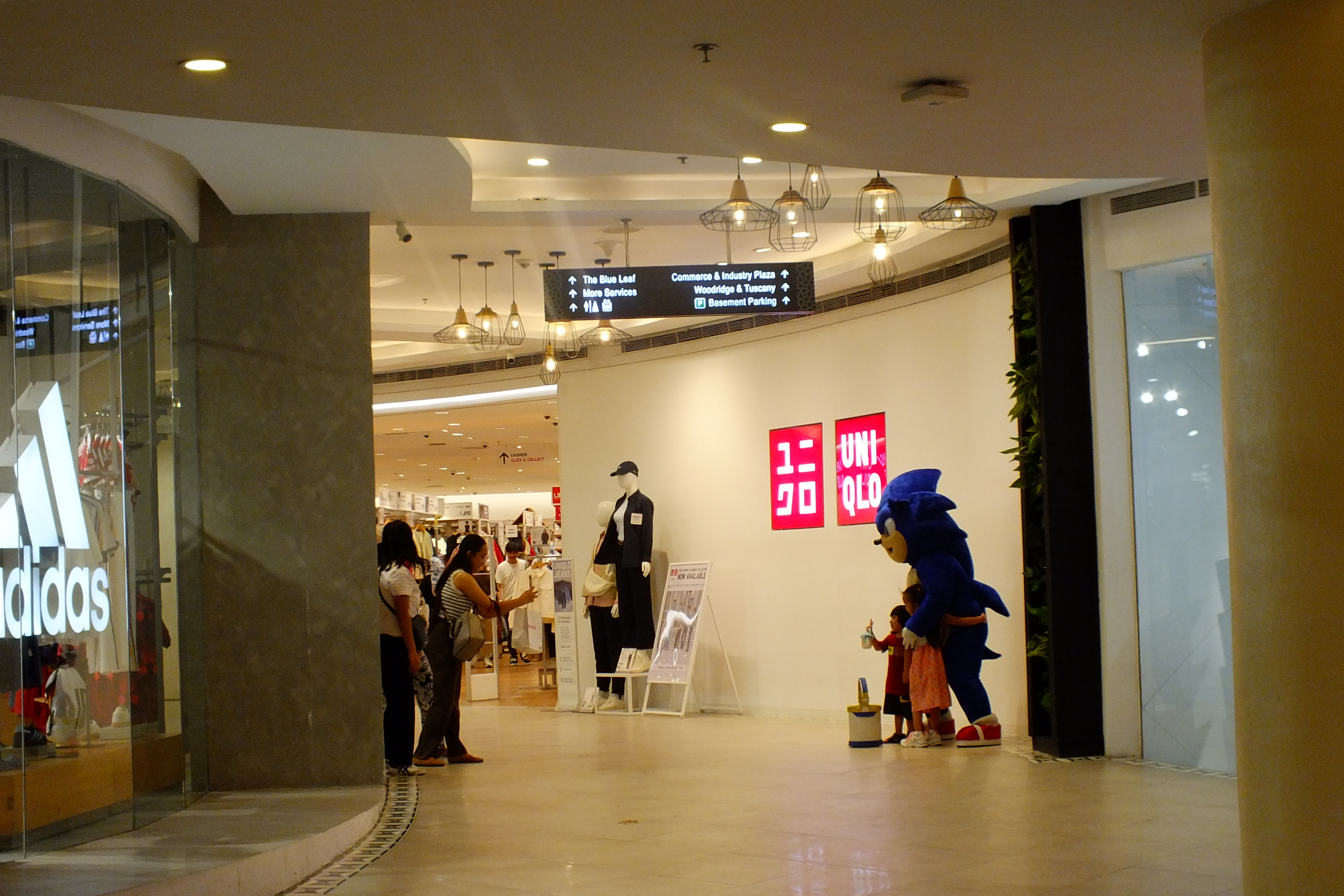
Mall interior

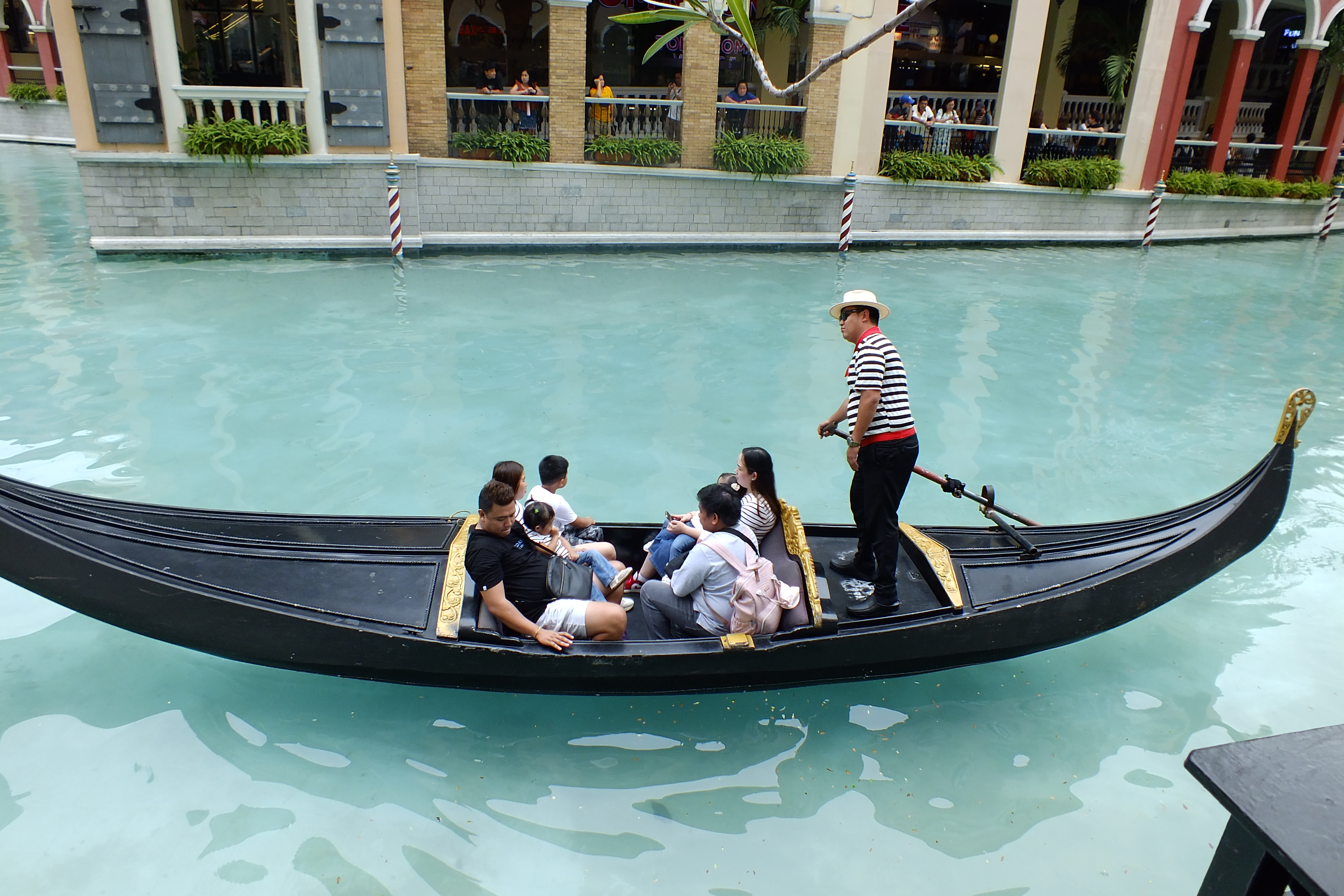
A gondola ride

St. Raphael the Archangel Chapel

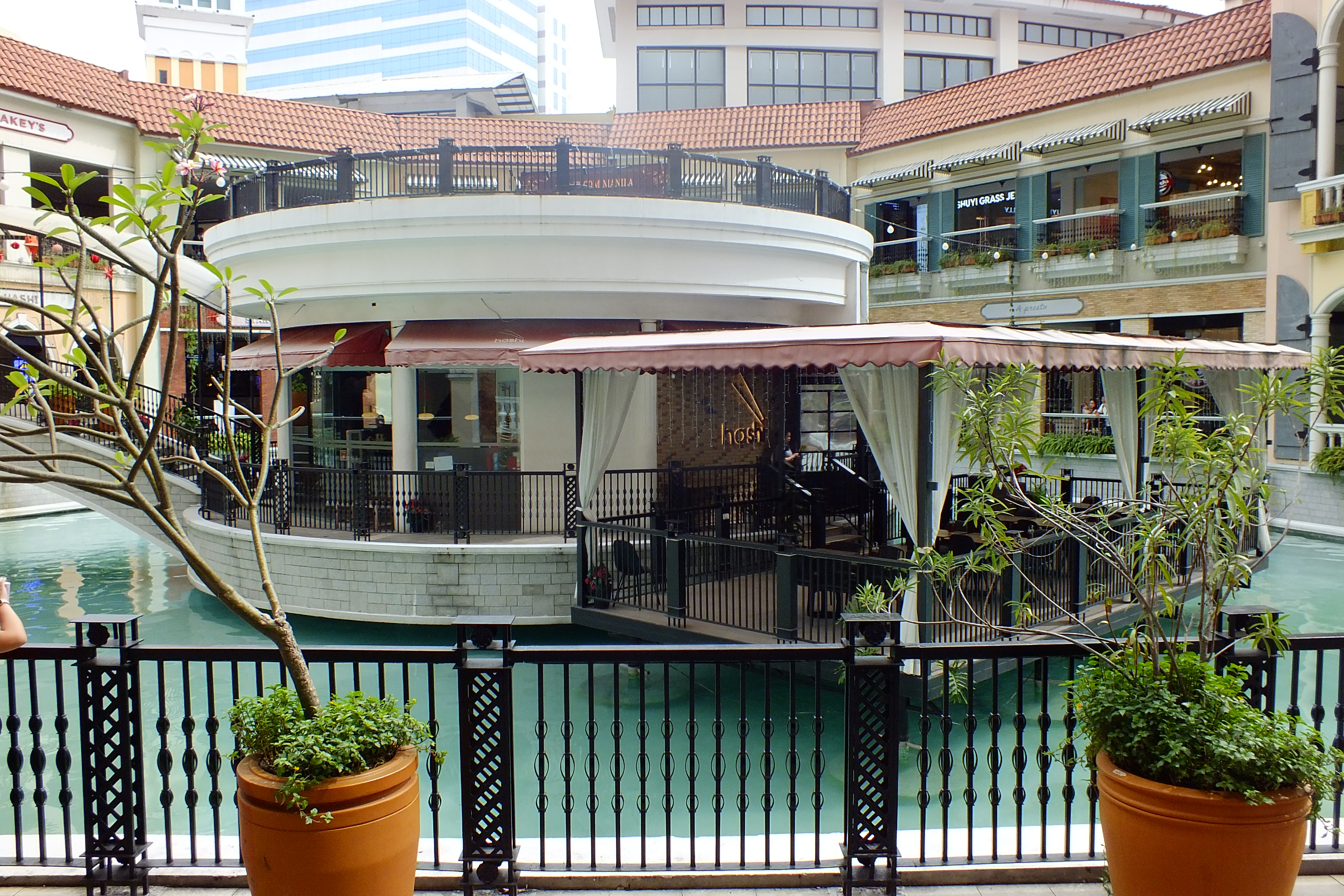
Hashi Pan-Asian Restaurant

== See also ==
- Grand Canal (Venice)
- Megaworld Lifestyle Malls
- Bonifacio Global City
