= Robinsons Summit Center =

- Robinsons Summit Center as seen from Ayala Avenue in 2022.
- Interactive map of the Robinsons Summit Center area

General information
- Status: Completed
- Type: Office
- Location: 6783 Ayala Avenue, Makati, Philippines
- Coordinates: 14°33′26.86″N 121°1′14.58″E
- Construction started: 1997
- Completed: 2001
- Opening: 2001
- Owner: Robinsons Land Corporation

Height
- Roof: 174 m (570.87 ft)

Technical details
- Floor count: 38

Design and construction
- Architects: Hellmuth, Obata + Kassabaum; W.V. Coscoluella & Associates
- Developer: Robinsons Land Corporation
- Structural engineer: R.S. Caparros Associates & Company
- Main contractor: D.M. Consunji, Inc.

Robinsons Summit Center, formerly known as the JG Summit Center, is an office skyscraper located in Makati, Philippines. It is owned by JG Summit Holdings, Inc., and developed by its real estate arm, Robinsons Land Corporation. It stands at 174 meters (571 ft), is currently the 9th-tallest complete building in Makati, and is one of the tallest buildings in the Philippines.

== Design ==
The Robinsons Summit Center was designed and masterplanned by the international architectural firm Hellmuth, Obata + Kassabaum (HOK), in cooperation with the Filipino architectural firm W.V. Coscolluela & Associates. The building's structural frame was designed by R.S. Caparros Associates & Company. The building has an unobstructed view of the Makati skyline from all floors. It has a double-height main lobby and double-height glass wall frontage and a three-zone vertical movement configuration for optimum elevator performance. A rooftop master antenna serves as an architectural highlight.

== Location ==
Located along Ayala Avenue near the corner of Paseo de Roxas, the Robinsons Summit Center is accessible near every other major destination in Makati. In its vicinity are the Glorietta Mall, Greenbelt, and Ayala Center, as well as educational institutions like the Asian Institute of Management, the Ateneo Graduate School of Business, and the Ateneo Law School. It is also a few blocks away from deluxe hotels like Makati Shangri-La, The Peninsula Manila, and Dusit Thani Manila, plus the service facilities of the Makati Medical Center and the Central Post Office.

The Robinsons Summit Center has been chosen as a location for major call centers and a telecommunications company.

== Amenities ==
The building is designed to comprise only 6 units per floor, with an average floor plate of only 1,200 square meters (13,000 sq ft). On the 8th and 9th floors is a branch of Fitness First. On the 37th floor are the Philippine operations of Hewlett-Packard Philippines Corporation. The building also has a helipad located on its roof deck, 10-level parking with over 390 slots, and is equipped with a state-of-the-art building management and communications system.

== See also ==
- List of tallest buildings in Metro Manila
