= Bagong Silang =

Former barangay in Caloocan, Metro Manila, Philippines

Bagong Silang Barangay 176
- Barrio (1971–1974); Barangay (1974–2024)
- Area
  - 2020: 5.24 km^{2} (2.02 sq mi)
- Population
  - 2020: 261,729
- Government
  - Type: Barangay
- Barangay Captain
  - 2013–2024: Joel Bacolod
- History
  - Established: 20 May 1971
Preceded by
Tala Estate
Succeeded by
176-A
176-B
176-C
176-D
176-E
176-F
- Today part of: Barangays 176-A, 176-B, 176-C, 176-D, 176-E, and 176-F

Bagong Silang or Barangay 176 was a barangay in Caloocan, Metro Manila, Philippines that existed from 1971 until its division in 2024. Part of the city's Zone 15, it was known for being the most populous barangay in the Philippines, with a population of 261,729 according to the 2020 census, with a land area measuring 574 hectares (1,420 acres). Due to its large population, there were calls to divide it. Following a plebiscite on August 31, 2024, it was divided into six distinct barangays: 176-A, 176-B, 176-C, 176-D, 176-E, and 176-F, though the area is still informally referred to as Bagong Silang.

Bagong Silang was also the northernmost barangay of Metro Manila, located in the northern section of the city bordering the province of Bulacan.

== History ==
Bagong Silang occupied parts of land originally of Tala Estate, which is historically under the jurisdiction of the town of Novaliches before it was absorbed by Caloocan in 1903. The 808-hectare (2,000-acre) estate was reserved and acquired by the government in 1938 primarily for a leprosarium, which turned out to be the Central Luzon Sanitarium (now the Dr. Jose N. Rodriguez Memorial Hospital); however, only one-third of the land was used for such purpose. Due to advancements in medical science that no longer required the segregation of hansenites, the leprosarium needed lesser land, paving the way for housing and urban development and plans for a tree plantation to supply logs for low-cost housing in present-day Metro Manila, which was ultimately abandoned due to administrative issues under President Ferdinand Marcos.

Bagong Silang was established as a barrio during the term of President Ferdinand Marcos in 1971. The name of the barangay is a Tagalog phrase corresponding to the English word newborn, meant to signify renewed hope for its residents who were resettled from their original slum areas in Manila, Commonwealth in Quezon City, and San Juan. It was converted into a barangay in 1974, following the nationwide implementation of the Integrated Reorganization Plan (IRP) under Presidential Decree No. 557.

=== Partitions ===
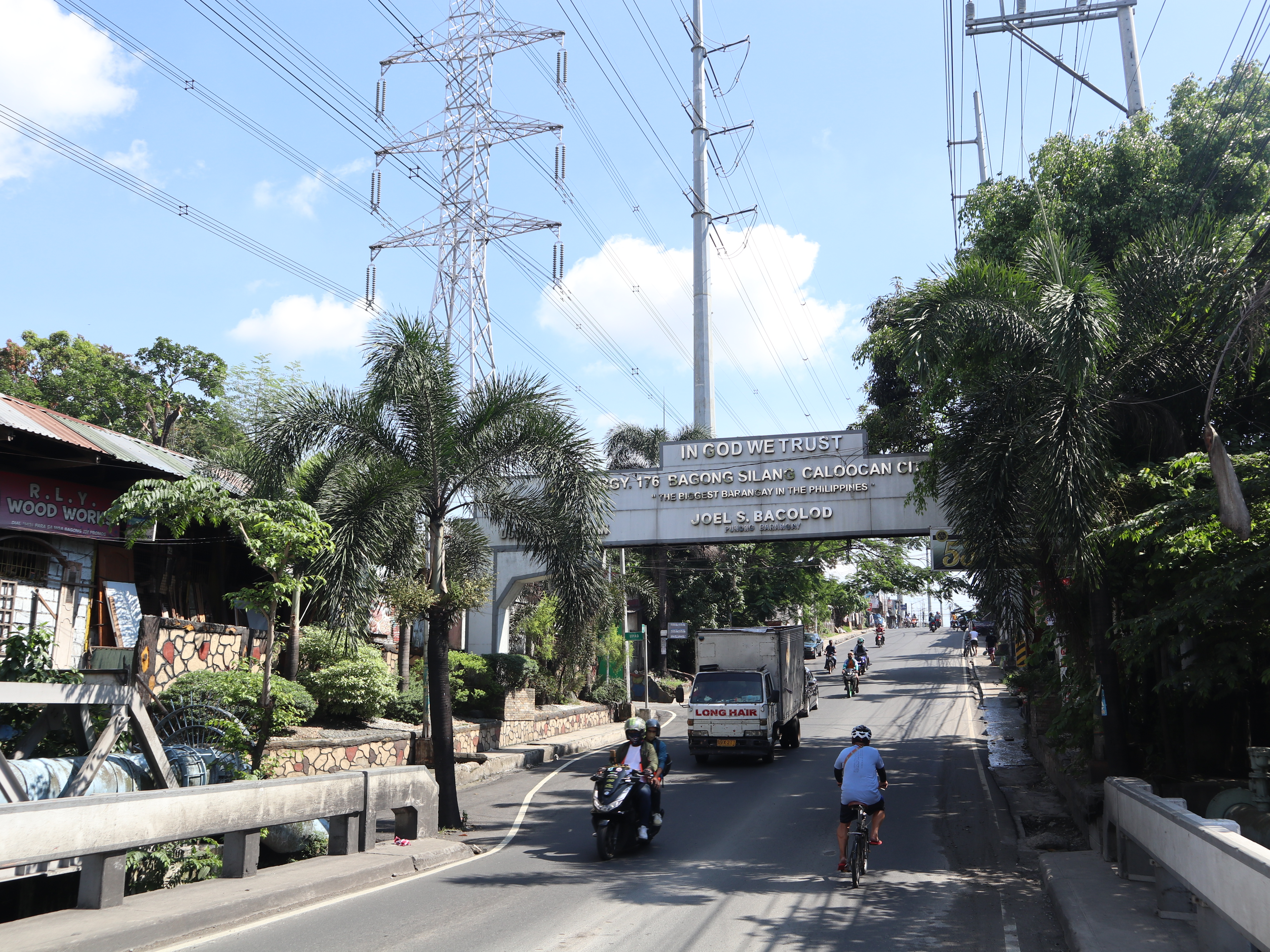
Bagong Silang Welcome Arch

In February 1989, President Corazon Aquino approved Republic Act (RA) No. 6714, reducing the number of barangays in Caloocan from 188 to 60. As part of this plan, Barangay 176 (Bagong Silang) was slated to be divided into five smaller barangays. A plebiscite was held on March 10; with only 10% of the city's voters participating. Majority of the participated voters reportedly opposed the proposal, thus the existing barangays continued as independent entities.

In September 2013, the barangay was proposed to be divided into seven smaller barangays to alleviate perceived issues in its administration. It was reported that residents complained that due to the barangay's size, both in terms of land area and population, government services were spread thin.

=== 2024 Division Plebiscite ===
In November 2022, Caloocan 1st district representative Oscar Malapitan introduced a bill for the partition. On April 3, 2024, President Bongbong Marcos signed Republic Act No. 11993, which divides the barangay into six smaller barangays designated with letters (from 176-A to 176-F), whose territories would consist of at least one existing "phases". The plebiscite, which was supposed to be done 90 days from the effectivity of the law, was held on August 31 in five public schools used as voting centers. A majority voted in favor of splitting the barangay.

The partition was organized by phases:

Partition by Phases
Barangay	Phases
176-A	Phases 1 and 4
176-B	Phases 2, 3 and 5
176-C	Phase 7
176-D	Phase 8
176-E	Phase 9
176-F	Phase 10

Plebiscite for Republic Act No. 11993
Choice	Votes	%
For	22,854	89.84
Against	2,584	10.16
Required majority		50.00
Total	25,438	100.00
Registered voters/turnout		29.63%
Source: COMELEC, via Manila Bulletin

== Geography ==
The barangay was located in North Caloocan. The Marilao River flowed along the northern and western borders of the barangay, separating it from Bulacan. Barangays 174, 175 and 178 lie south of Bagong Silang, while Barangays 187 and 188 lie on the east. Due to its large population, addresses in the barangay were formatted as Phase (Phases 1 to 10), Package, Block and Lot.

== Demographics ==
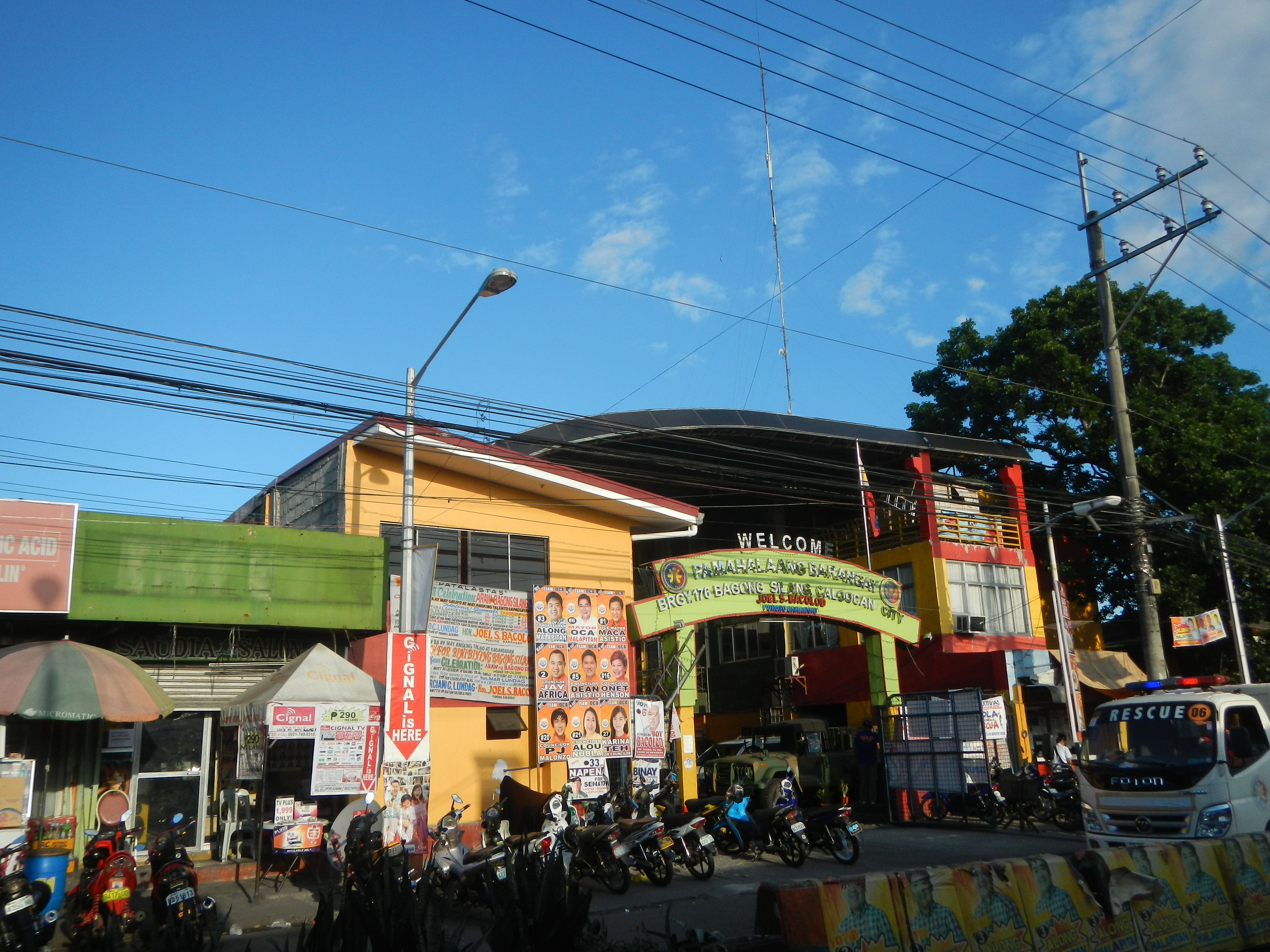
Barangay hall (Barangay 176)

Bagong Silang was the largest barangay in terms of population with 261,729 people, which accounts for about 15.75% of Caloocan's total population as of 2020. It was more populous than about two-thirds of the cities in the country. It became the relocation site of people living in slum areas across the present-day Metro Manila since the 1970s greatly contributing to the barangay's population.

== Schools ==
There were seven public elementary schools and four public high schools in Bagong Silang.

=== Elementary ===
1. Bagong Silang Elementary School – Phase 1
2. Sto. Niño Elementary School – Phase 1
3. Gabriela Silang Elementary School (former Bagong Silang Elementary School – Annex) – Phase 1
4. Rene Cayetano Elementary School – Phase 8B
5. Pag-asa Elementary School – Phase 7B
6. Silanganan Elementary School – Phase 3
7. Kalayaan Elementary School – Phase 10B

=== High School ===
1. Bagong Silang High School – Phase 3
2. Benigno Aquino Jr. High School – Phase 2
3. Kalayaan National High School – Phase 10B
4. Tala High School – Phase 5

== Gallery ==
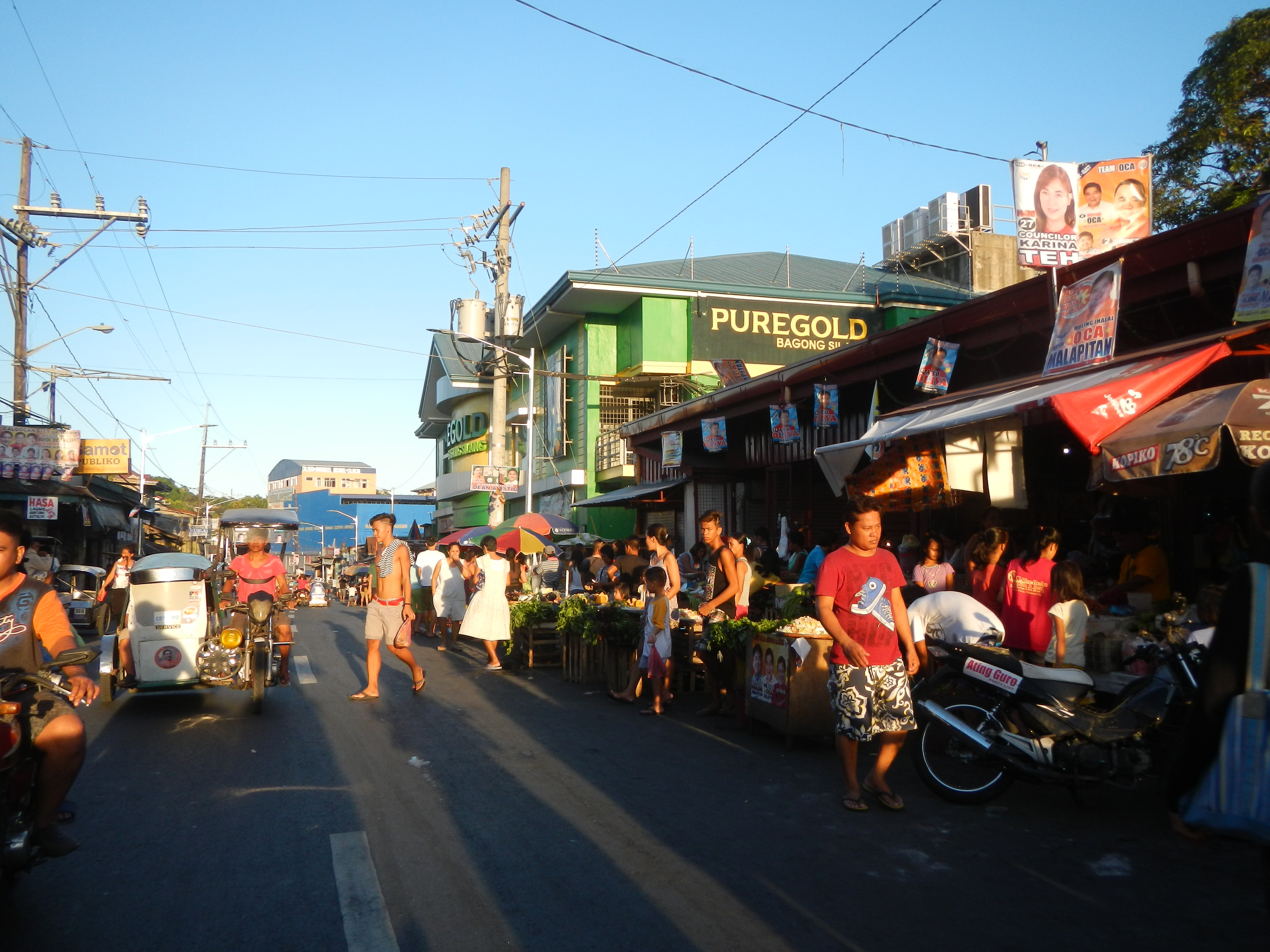
Langit Road

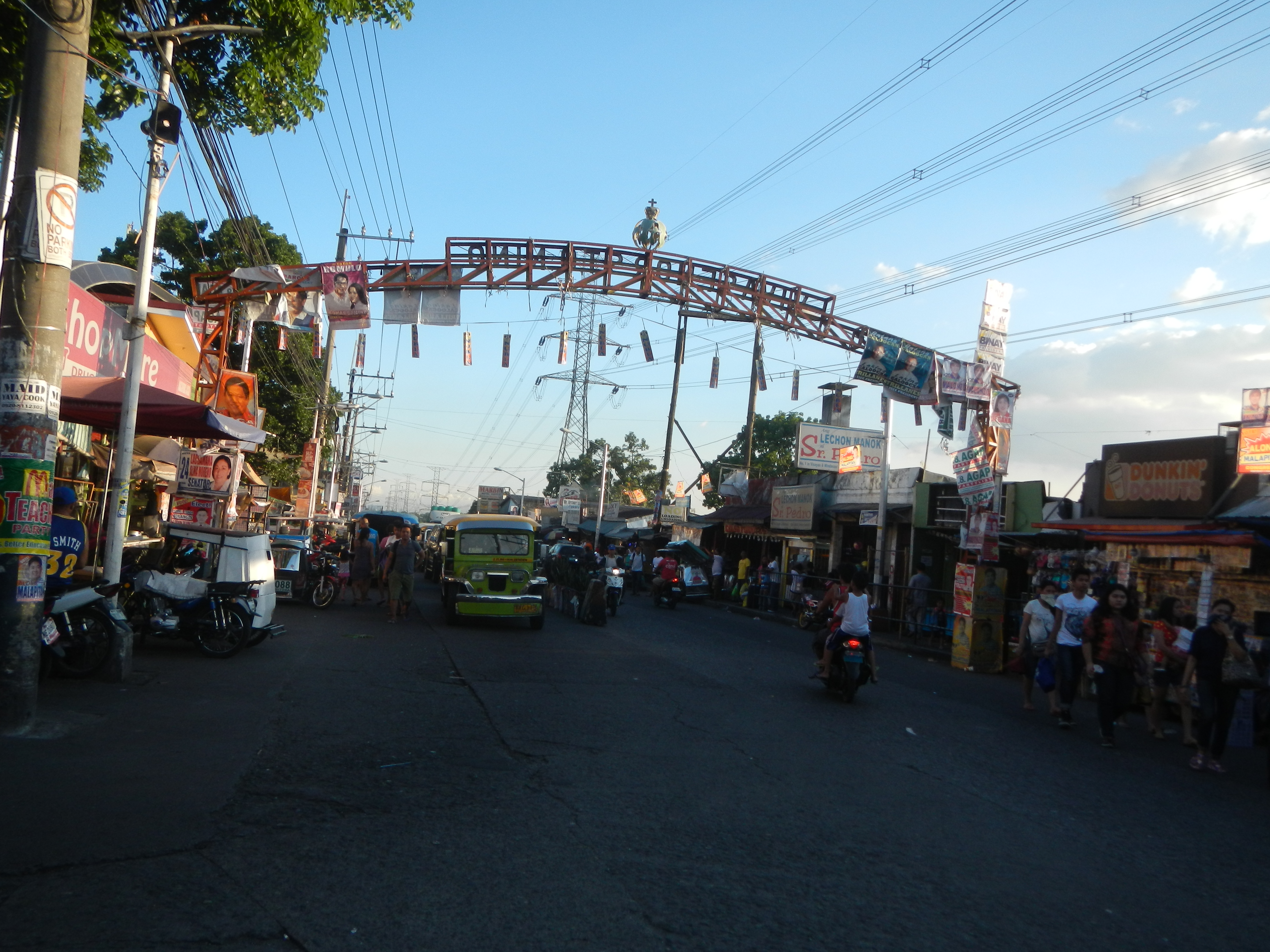
Zabarte Road

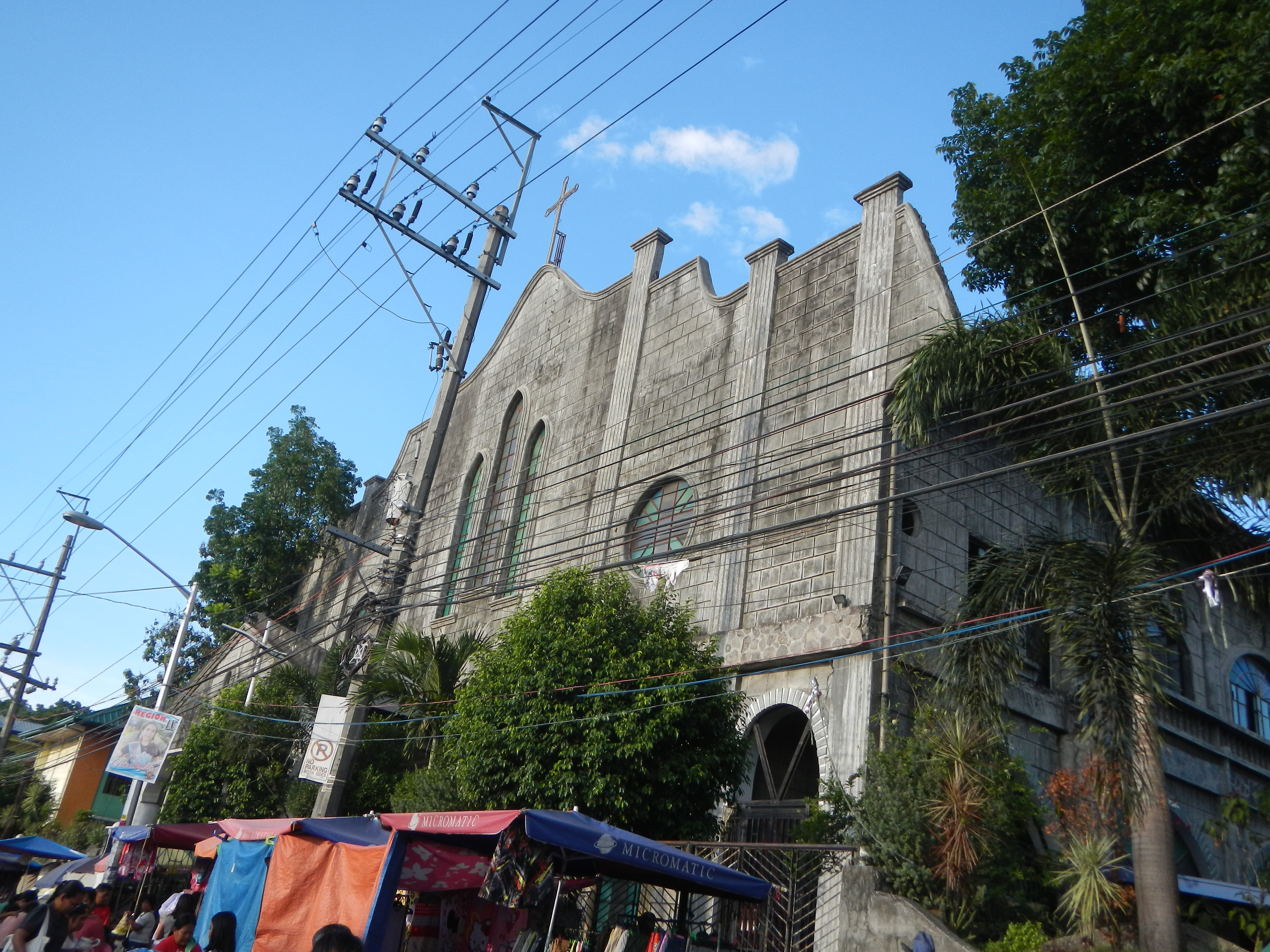
Santo Niño Parish Church

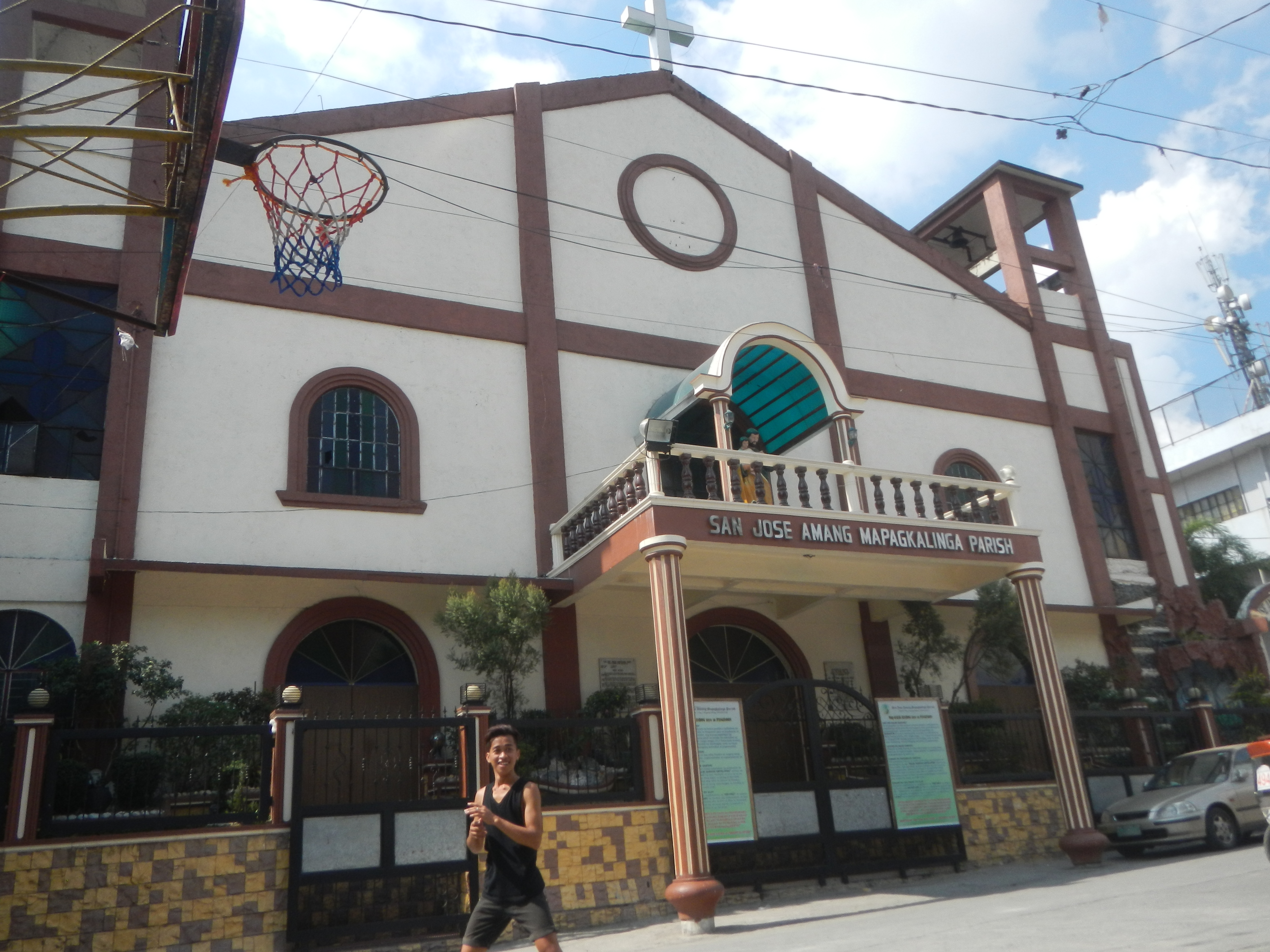
San Jose Amang Mapagkalinga Parish Church

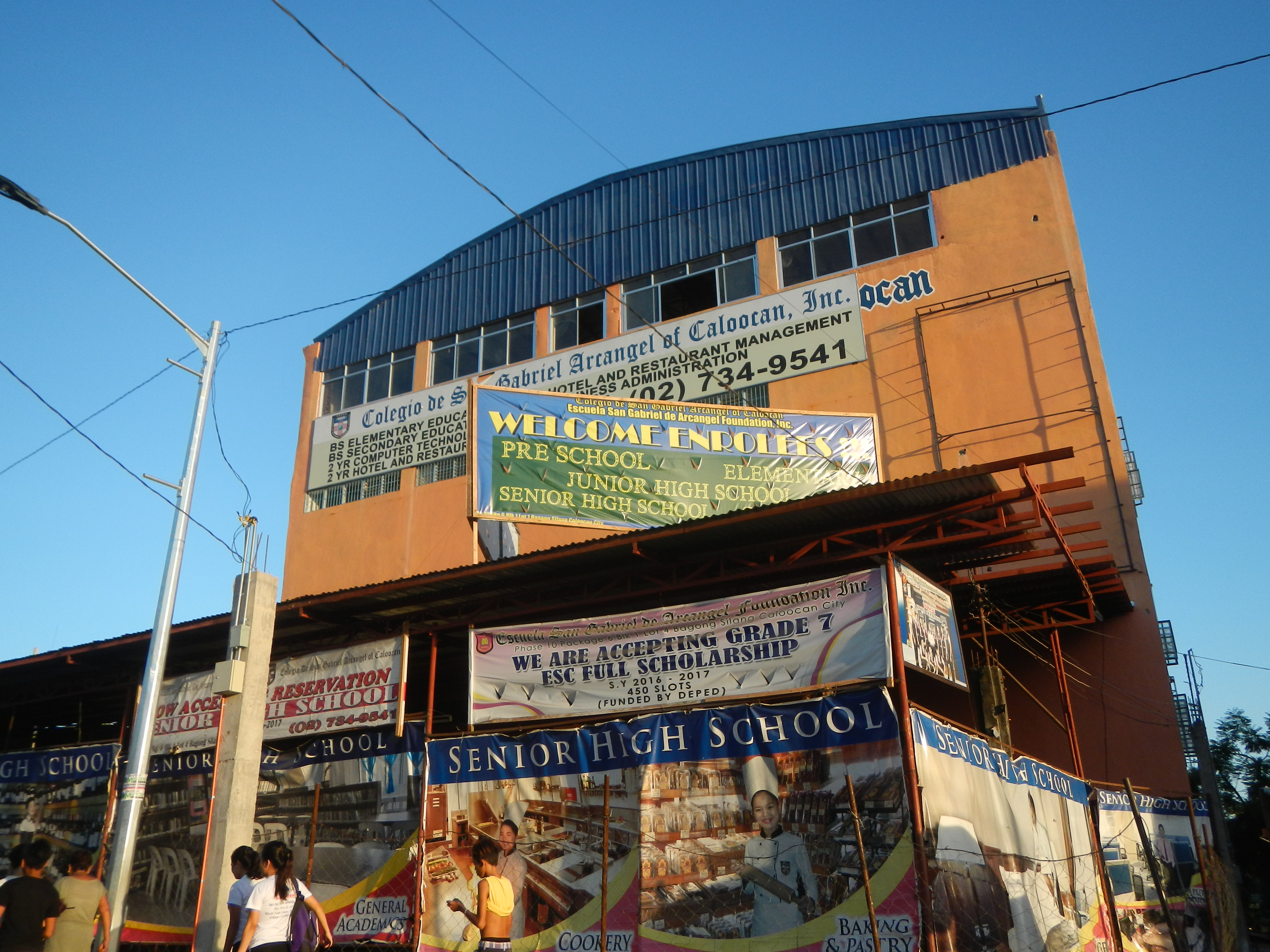
Colegio de San Gabriel Arcangel of Caloocan

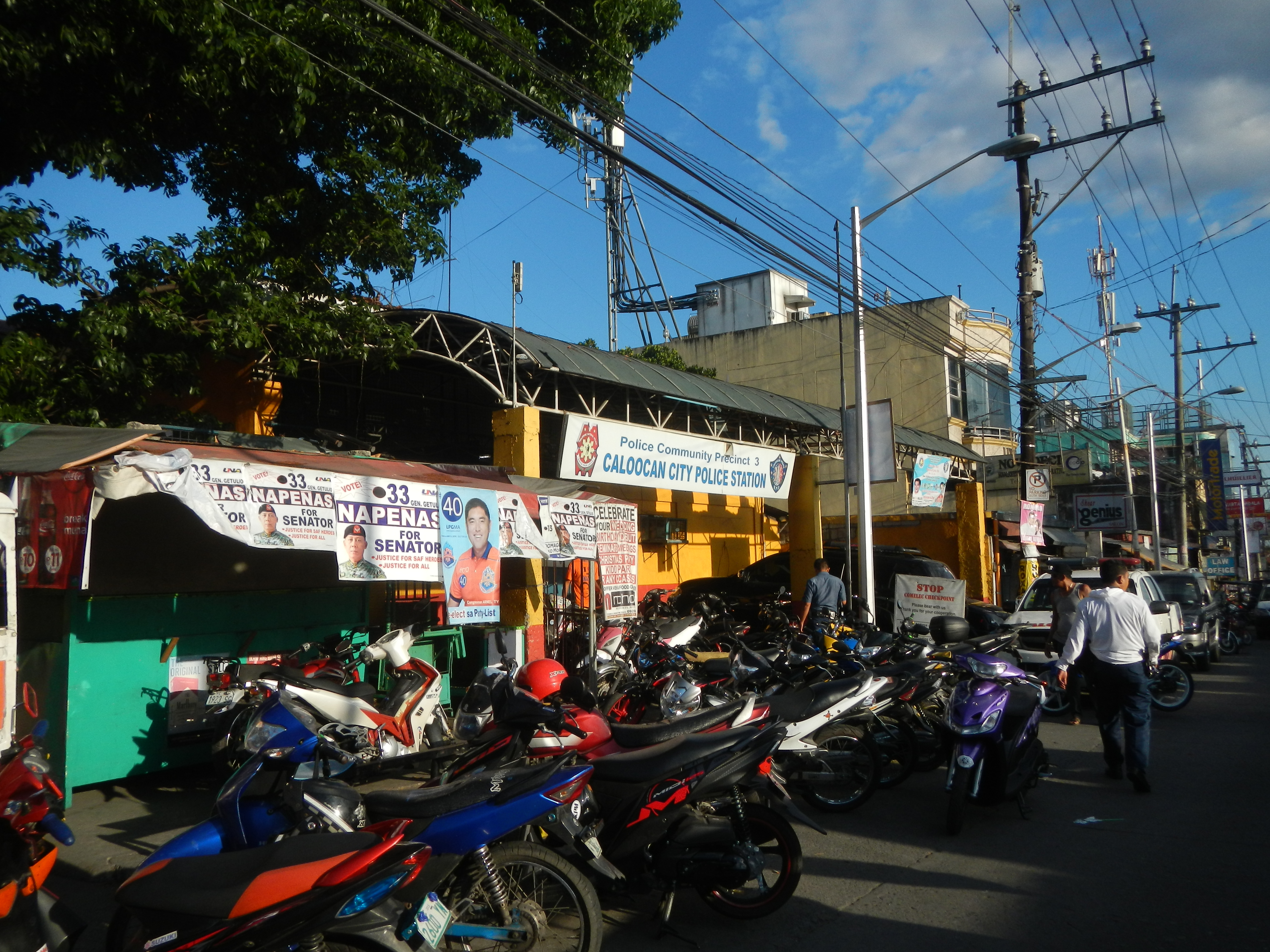
Police Community Precinct 3
