= Magallanes station =

Train station in Makati, Philippines

Coordinates: 14°32′30.43″N 121°01′09.24″E

Magallanes	YL12
- Magallanes station in October 2026

General information
- Location: EDSA; Makati, Metro Manila; Philippines
- Owner: Department of Transportation
- Operator: Department of Transportation
- Line: MRT Line 3
- Platforms: 2 (2 side)
- Tracks: 2
- Connections: EDSA; Future: E Magallanes

Construction
- Structure type: Elevated
- Parking: Yes (Alphaland Southgate, San Lorenzo Place)
- Accessible: Concourse: All entrances Platforms: All platforms

History
- Opened: July 20, 2000; 26 years ago

Services
Preceding station	Manila MRT	Following station
Ayala towards North Avenue	MRT Line 3	Taft Avenue Terminus
Out-of-system interchange
Preceding station	PNR	Following station
Dela Rosa towards Governor Pascual	North Shuttle transfer at EDSA	FTI towards Bicutan
Pasay Road towards Tutuban	Metro South Commuter transfer at EDSA	Nichols towards IRRI
Track layout
Location

Magallanes station is an elevated Metro Rail Transit (MRT) station located on the MRT Line 3 (MRT-3) system in Makati. The station is adjacent to the Magallanes Interchange and barangay Magallanes of Makati, which is in turn is named after Ferdinand Magellan. Although the station is named after Magallanes, it also serves passengers from Kayamanan-C and barangays Dasmariñas, Pio del Pilar, and San Lorenzo in Makati, and those from Taguig.

The station is the twelfth station for trains headed to Taft Avenue and the second station for trains headed to North Avenue. It is the last station in Makati before it crosses over to Pasay.

== History ==
Magallanes station was opened on July 20, 2000, when MRT's operation was extended south to Taft Avenue, after previously operating between Buendia to North Avenue beginning in 1999. Its opening was delayed due to inclusion of additional work orders by the Department of Transportation and Communications (DOTC), including the Tramo Flyover in Pasay. Links to Alphaland Southgate Mall and San Lorenzo Place Mall, respectively, were later added to the station as these malls opened in 2009 and in 2013, respectively.

== Nearby landmarks ==
The station is the closest MRT station to the South Luzon Expressway, as well as to Chino Roces Avenue. It is also located near Dasmariñas Village and Ecology Village, two major residential areas in the Makati area. It is also close to some prominent business headquarters and institutions, like those of the Philippine operations of Levi's and GlaxoSmithKline, schools such as Assumption College San Lorenzo, Makati Hope Christian School, and Colegio San Agustin-Makati, the upscale Paseo de Magallanes, Wilcon IT Hub, and Studio 300 bowling alley. The station is directly connected to Alphaland Southgate Mall and Tower, Teleperformance Building within the building, and San Lorenzo Place Mall.

== Transportation links ==
The transport terminal outside the station serves tricycles, taxis, jeepneys, and buses. Buses that ply the EDSA and South Luzon Expressway routes (both city and provincial) stop near the station. Passengers may board jeepneys under the Magallanes Interchange, wherein these go to various locations in Metro Manila, such as northern and western Makati, Makati Central Business District, Taguig, Pasay, Parañaque, and Muntinlupa, and at San Lorenzo Place, where northbound jeepneys plying Chino Roces Avenue depart. Taxis are also available near the station and the taxi stands are located.

Passengers may also take a short walk to EDSA railway station, located below the Magallanes Interchange and west of Chino Roces Avenue, to take the PNR Metro Commuter Line. However, this was closed to give way for the construction of the North–South Commuter Railway (NSCR), which has its new station connected to that station.

== Gallery ==
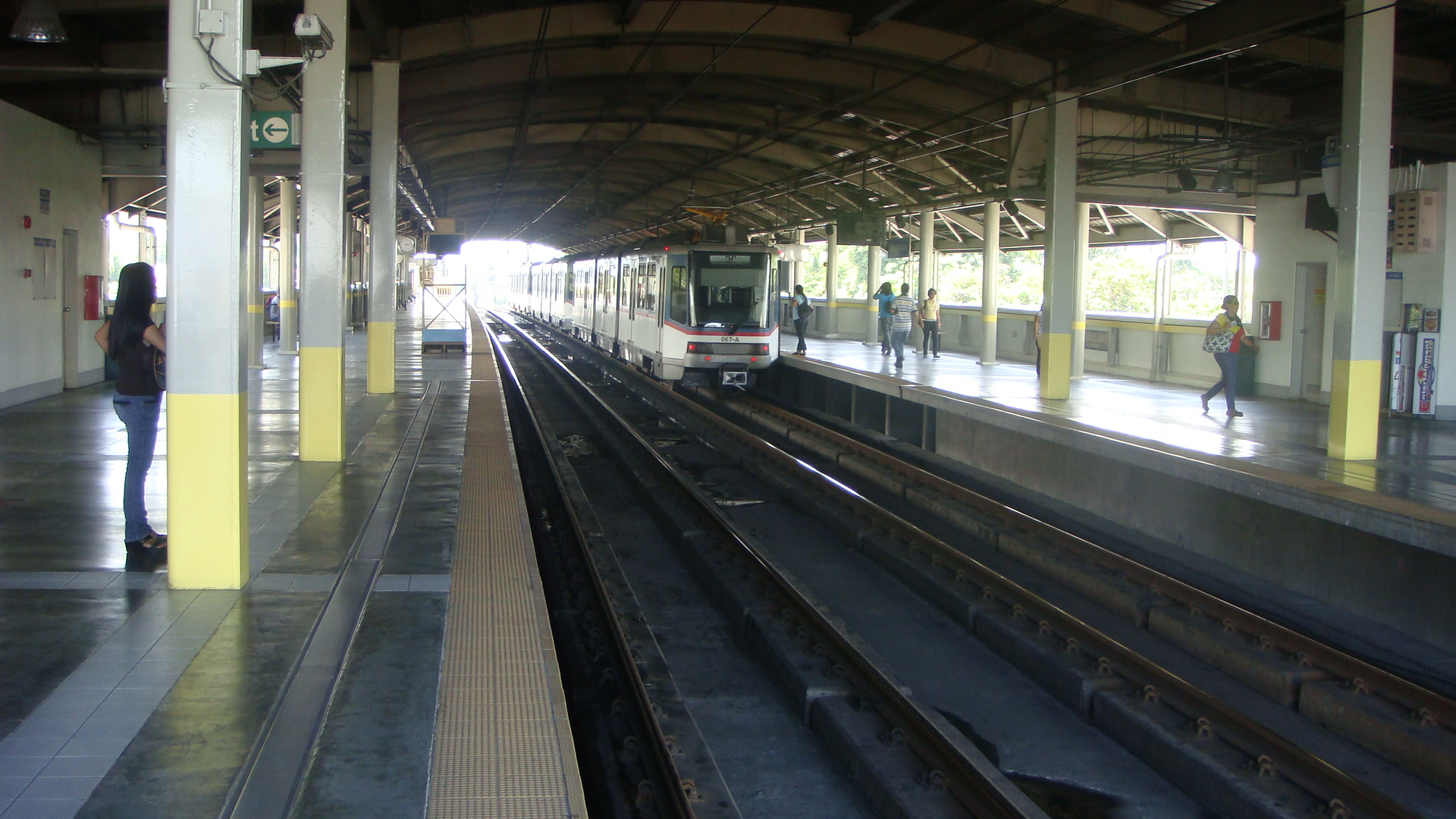
Panoramic view of the station

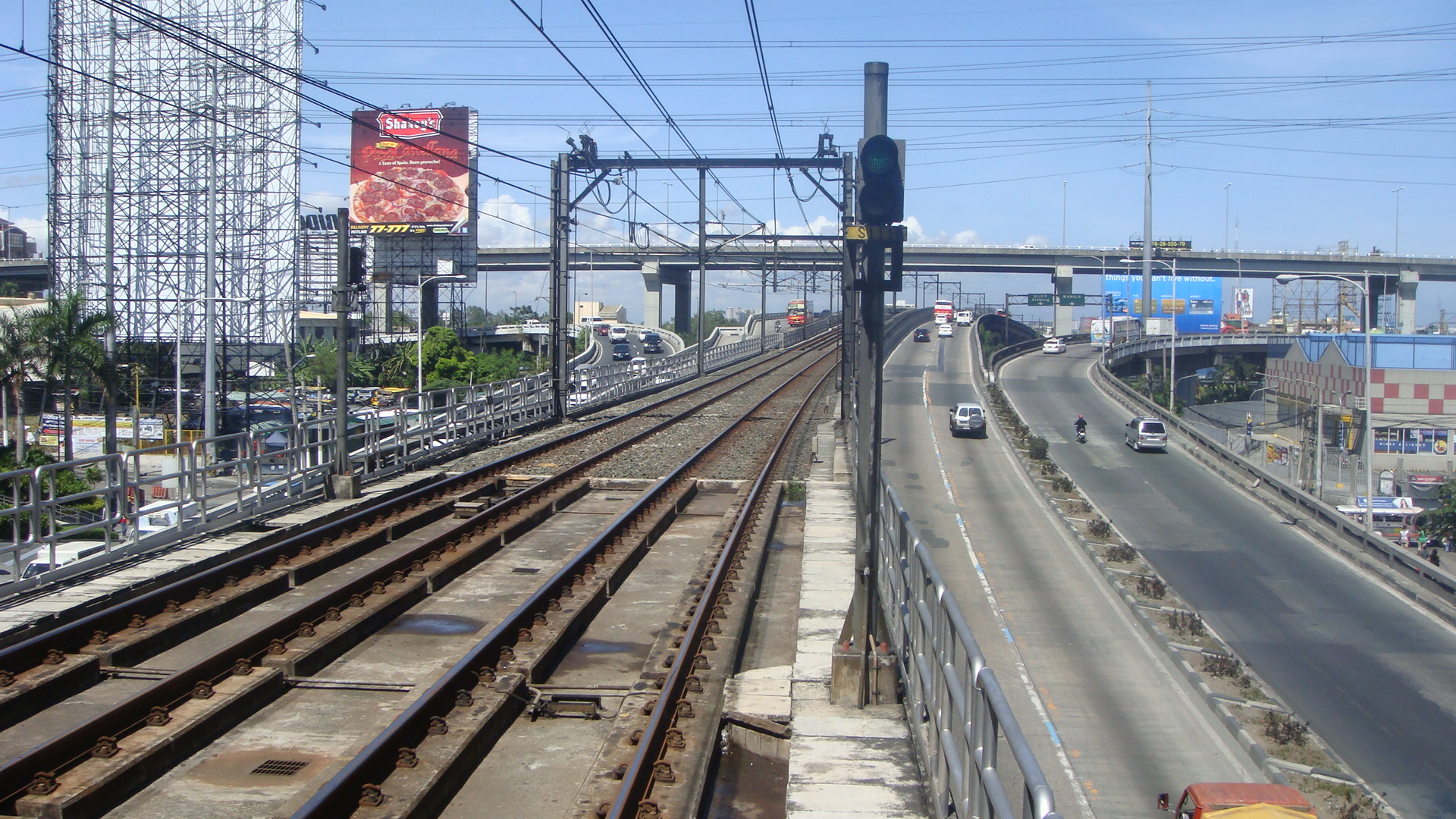
View of the rails

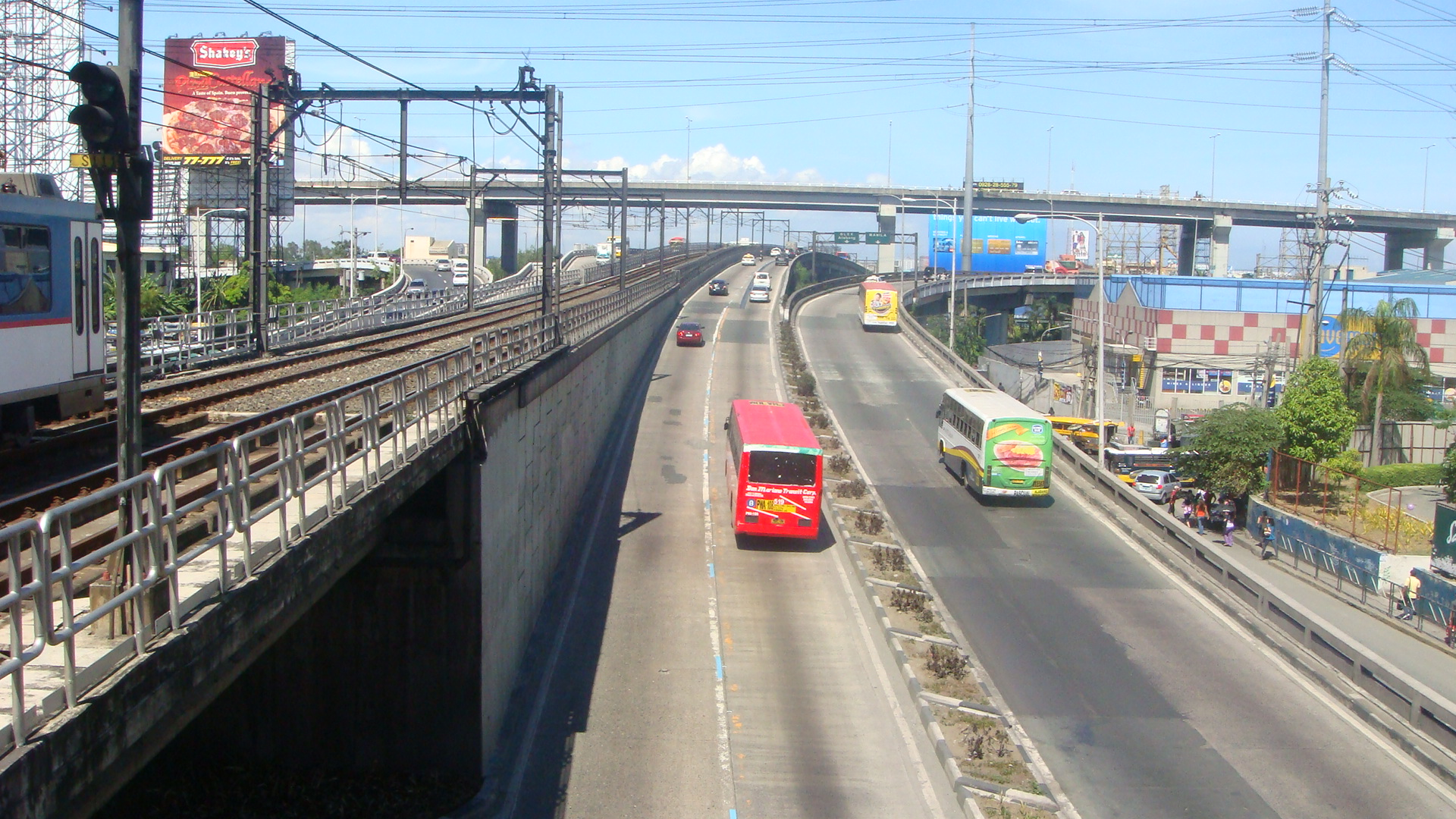
Overview of Makati from the station

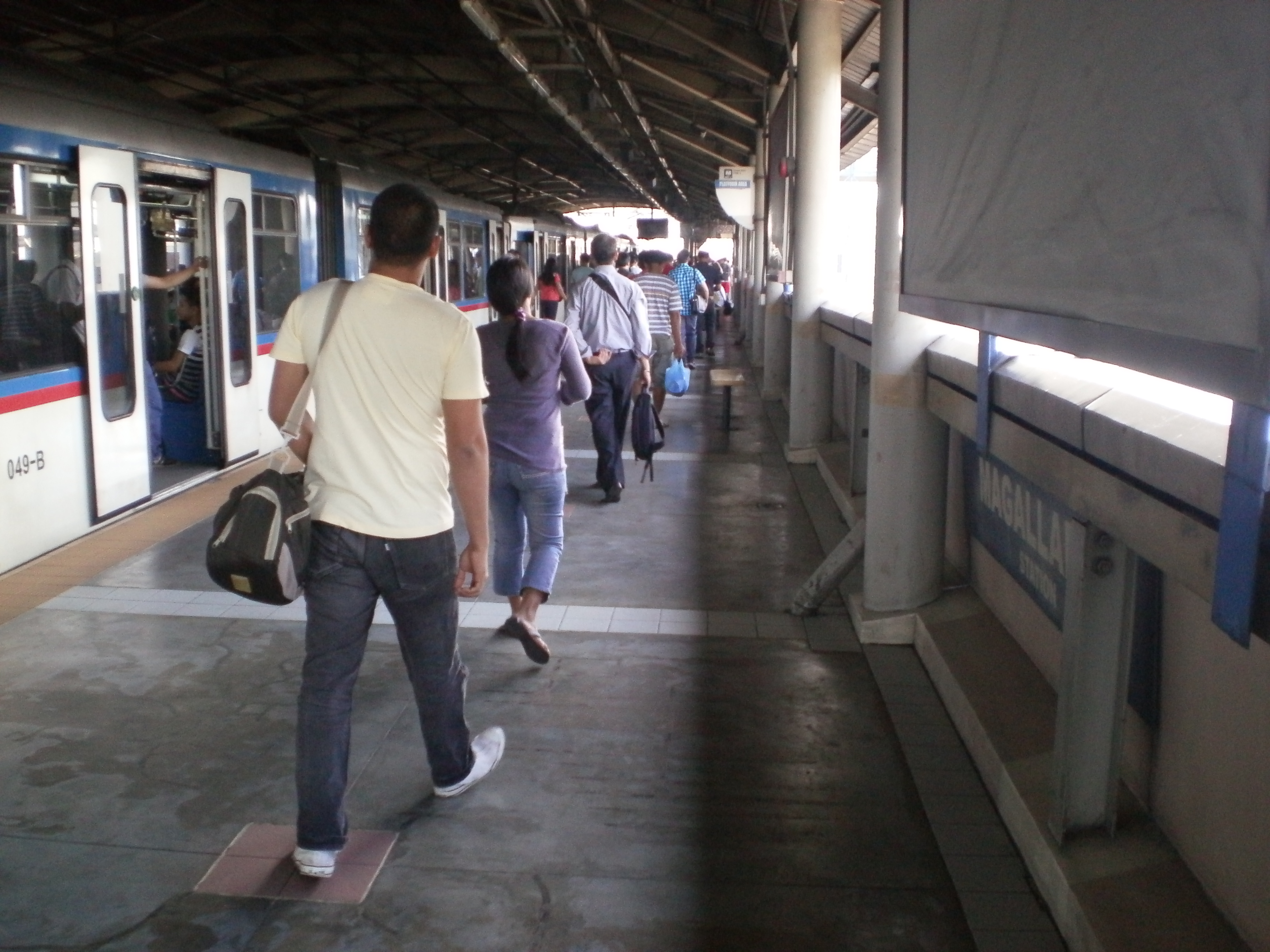
Vast platform area with a train in the station

== See also ==
- List of rail transit stations in Metro Manila
- MRT Line 3 (Metro Manila)
