= Buendia station (PNR) =

Railway station in Makati, Philippines

Buendia
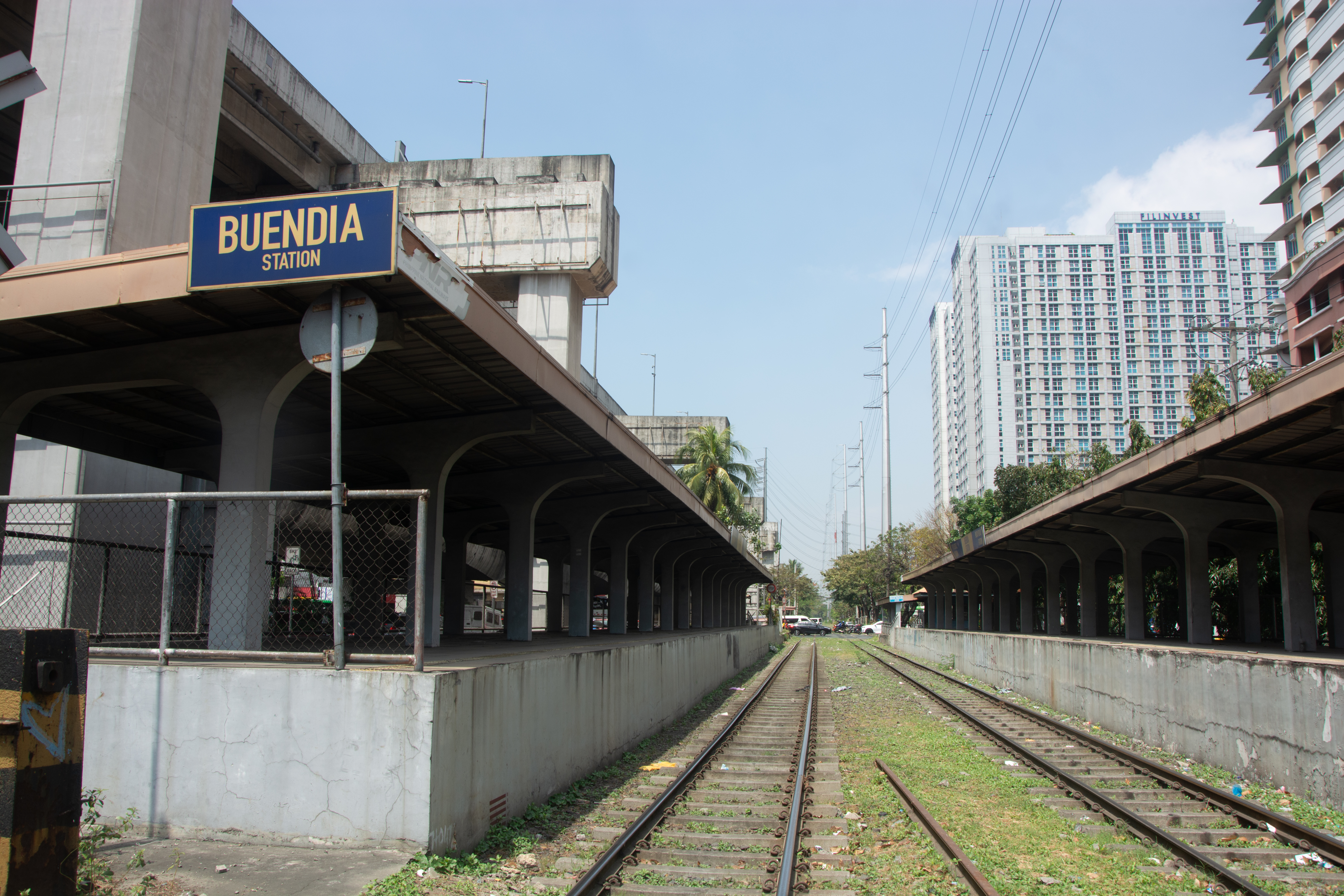
- The station in 2024

General information
- Location: Osmeña Highway, Pio del Pilar; Makati, Metro Manila; Philippines
- Coordinates: 14°33′26.47″N 121°0′29.17″E
- Owner: Philippine National Railways
- Operator: Philippine National Railways
- Lines: Planned: South Commuter; Former: South Main Line
- Platforms: Side platforms
- Tracks: 2

Construction
- Structure type: At grade
- Accessible: Yes

Other information
- Station code: DIA

History
- Opened: November 24, 1975; 50 years ago
- Opening: c. 2024–28 (NSCR)
- Closed: September 8, 2017; 8 years ago
- Rebuilt: 1990, 2009
- Former names: Buendia Crossing

Services
Preceding station	PNR	Following station
Vito Cruz towards Tutuban	Metro South Commuter	Dela Rosa towards IRRI
Nichols towards Tutuban	Metro South Commuter	Bicutan towards IRRI
Future services
Preceding station	PNR	Following station
Clark International Airport Terminus	Airport Limited Express	FTI towards Alabang
Paco towards Clark International Airport	NSCR Commuter CIA–Calamba	EDSA towards Calamba
Paco towards Tutuban	NSCR Commuter Tutuban–Calamba	EDSA towards Calamba
Santa Mesa towards Clark International Airport	Commuter Express CIA–Calamba	EDSA towards Calamba
Santa Mesa towards Tutuban	Commuter Express Tutuban–Calamba	EDSA towards Calamba
Location
- Location within Metro Manila Location within Luzon Location within Philippines

Buendia station is a former railway station located on the South Main Line in Makati, Metro Manila, Philippines.

Buendia was the ninth station from Tutuban and is one of three stations serving Makati, the other two being Pasay Road and EDSA. It was permanently closed in favor of a newly constructed, more spacious Dela Rosa station located south across Dela Rosa Street.

== History ==
Buendia station was opened on November 24, 1975 as part of the 83rd anniversary of PNR coincided with the track duplication from Paco to Pasay Road, the station was renovated from 1989 to 1990 for the Metrotren Commuter service.

During the Northrail–Southrail Linkage Project, the platforms were raised with renovation of the station area and formally reopened on July 14, 2009.

On September 8, 2017, the station was closed due to short platforms where four to five-car trains do not fit. A new station, called Dela Rosa station, was built south of the former station.

The station will be repurposed as an elevated station and reopened as a major stop on the North–South Commuter Railway. The opening date is set beyond 2030.

== Gallery ==
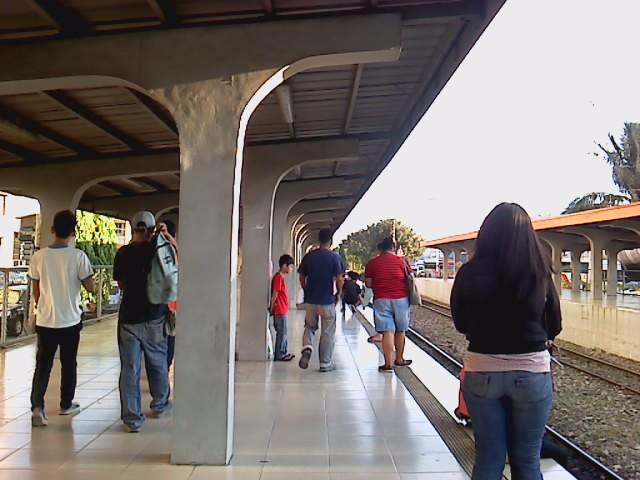
MSC 1645

== Nearby landmarks ==
The station is near Cash and Carry Mall in Barangay Palanan and an SM Hypermarket on the other side of the Osmeña Highway in Barangay San Isidro. Further away from the station are Makati Central Square (formerly Makati Cinema Square) and Exportbank Plaza. Nearby schools are San Antonio National High School, Pio Del Pilar Elementary School and San Isidro National High School. A cluster of Cityland condominiums is located right behind the station.

== Transportation links ==
Buendia station is accessible by jeepneys and buses plying the Taft Avenue and South Luzon Expressway routes. A terminal for San Antonio cycle rickshaws is located across the station on the other side of Gil Puyat Avenue, while Pio del Pilar cycle rickshaws also drop commuters off at the station.

The station was located roughly midway between Buendia MRT station, at the intersection with EDSA, also in Makati, and Gil Puyat LRT station, at the intersection with Taft Avenue in Pasay.
