= Dela Rosa station =

Railway station in the Philippines

Dela Rosa
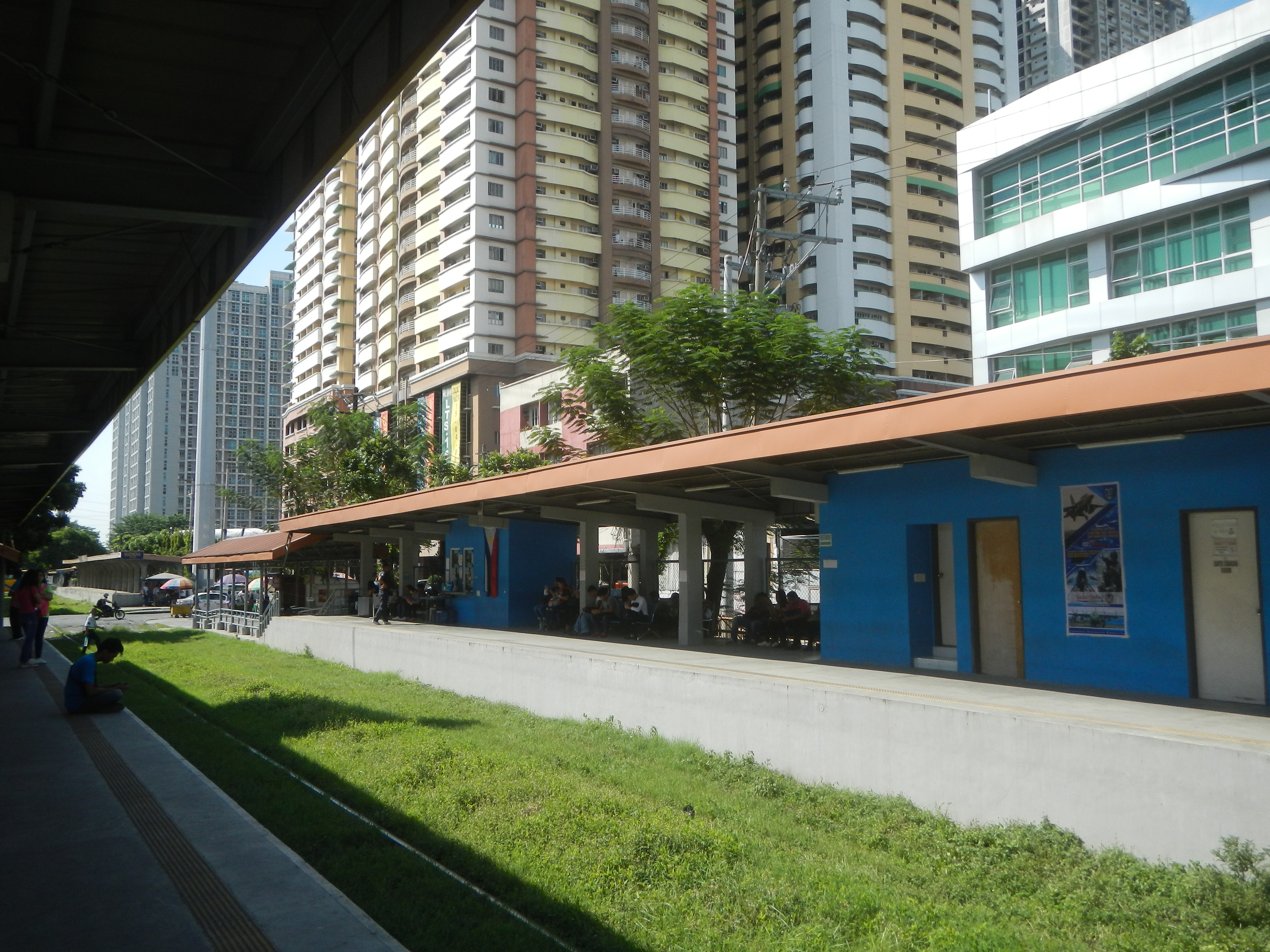

General information
- Location: Osmeña Highway corner Dela Rosa Street, Pio del Pilar
- Coordinates: 14°33′22.34″N 121°0′31.26″E
- Owner: Philippine National Railways
- Operator: Philippine National Railways
- Line: South Main Line
- Platforms: Side platforms
- Tracks: 2
- Connections: Buses, jeepneys, tricycles

Construction
- Structure type: At grade
- Accessible: Yes

Other information
- Station code: DLR

History
- Opened: September 8, 2017; 8 years ago
- Closed: March 24, 2024; 2 years ago

Services
Preceding station	PNR	Following station
Paco towards Governor Pascual	North Shuttle	EDSA railway towards Bicutan
Vito Cruz railway towards Tutuban	Metro South Commuter	Pasay Road towards IRRI
Location
- Location within Metro Manila Location within Luzon Location within Philippines

Dela Rosa station is a railway station located on the South Main Line in Makati, Metro Manila, Philippines.

Dela Rosa is the ninth station from Tutuban and is one of three PNR stations serving Makati, the other two being Pasay Road and EDSA.

Dela Rosa station is the replacement of Buendia station, which closed on September 7, 2017.

On August 1, 2018, Dela Rosa station became part of newly opened Caloocan shuttle line until September 10 when the line was extended to FTI railway station as the new terminus of the said line. The station was closed on March 28, 2024, as part of the Tutuban–Alabang segment, to make way for the construction of the North–South Commuter Railway.

== Nearby landmarks ==
The station is near the Cash & Carry Mall in Palanan and an SM Hypermarket in San Isidro, both across the Osmeña Highway. Further away from the station are Exportbank Plaza and the San Antonio and San Isidro national high schools, and Hen. Pio del Pilar Elementary School I. A cluster of Cityland condominiums is also located right behind the station.

== Transportation links ==
Dela Rosa station is accessible by jeepneys and buses plying the Gil Puyat Avenue and South Luzon Expressway routes. A terminal of jeepneys bound to Ayala MRT station & One Ayala (Ayala), Buendia MRT station (Bel-Air), and Magallanes MRT station (Mantrade); could be found along Medina Street beside the station, as well as Libertad LRT station (Libertad) could also be found along Dela Rosa Street. A tricycle terminal plying the adjacent San Antonio is located on Gil Puyat Avenue, while those plying Pio del Pilar also drop commuters off at the station.

The station is located roughly midway between Buendia MRT station at the intersection with Epifanio de los Santos Avenue and Gil Puyat LRT station at the intersection with Taft Avenue.
