= EDSA station (PNR) =

Southrail stop in Makati, Philippines

EDSA
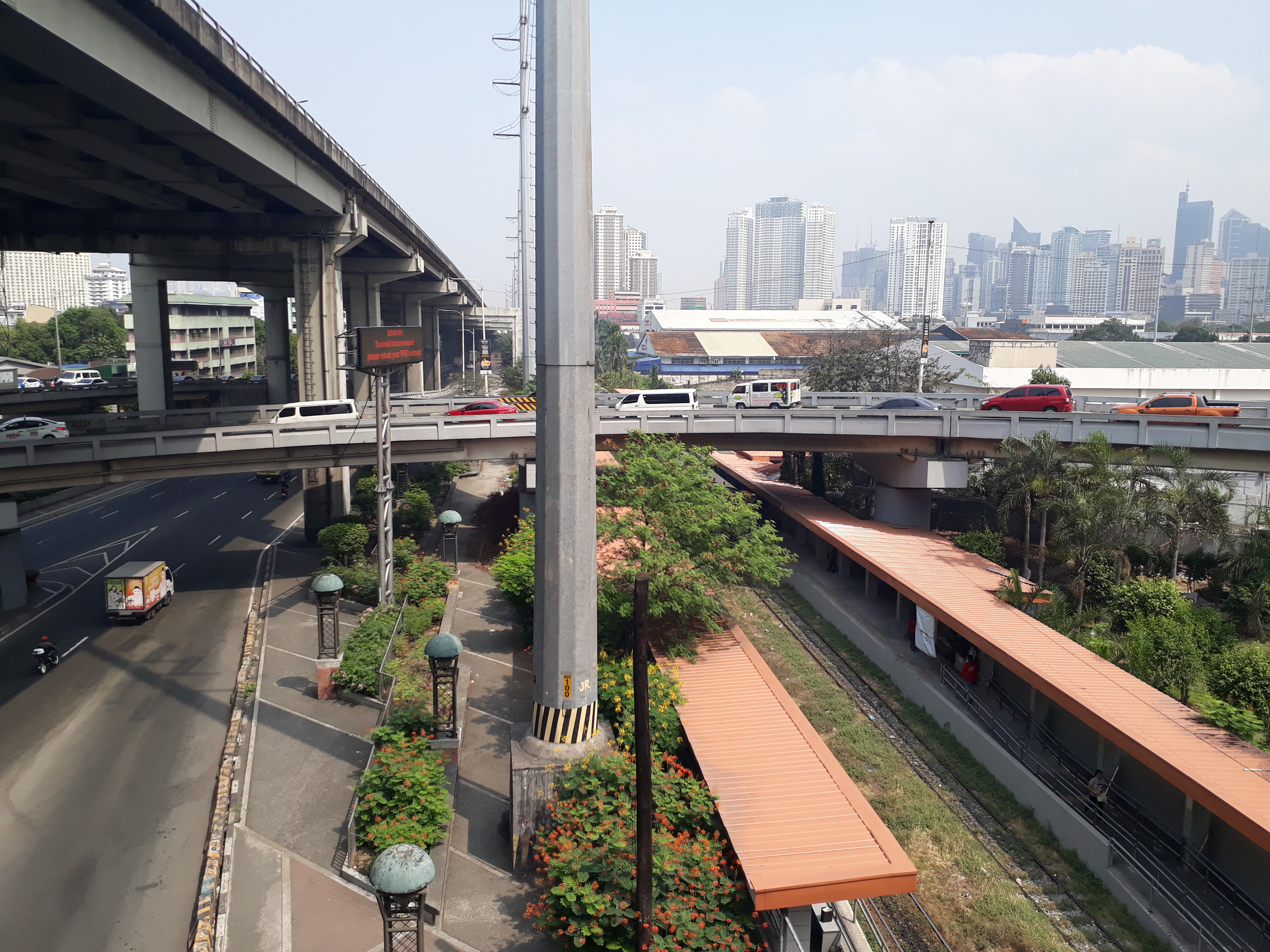
- EDSA Station in 2018

General information
- Location: Osmeña Highway, Bangkal, Makati, Metro Manila, Philippines
- Coordinates: 14°32′30.33″N 121°0′59.39″E
- Owner: Philippine National Railways
- Operator: Philippine National Railways
- Lines: South Main Line; Planned: South Commuter
- Platforms: Side platforms
- Tracks: 2
- Connections: Magallanes; Buses, jeepneys, and taxis

Construction
- Structure type: At grade
- Parking: Yes (San Lorenzo Place)
- Accessible: Yes

Other information
- Station code: EDS

History
- Closed: March 28, 2024
- Rebuilt: 2005

Services
Preceding station	PNR	Following station
Dela Rosa towards Governor Pascual	North Shuttle	FTI towards Bicutan
Pasay Road towards Tutuban	Metro South Commuter	Nichols towards IRRI
Out-of-system interchange
Preceding station	Manila MRT	Following station
Ayala towards North Avenue	MRT Line 3 transfer at Magallanes	Taft Avenue Terminus
Future services
Preceding station	PNR	Following station
Buendia towards Clark International Airport	NSCR Commuter CIA–Calamba	Senate–DepEd towards Calamba
Buendia towards Tutuban	NSCR Commuter Tutuban–Calamba	Senate–DepEd towards Calamba
Buendia towards Clark International Airport	Commuter Express CIA–Calamba	FTI towards Calamba
Buendia towards Tutuban	Commuter Express Tutuban–Calamba	FTI towards Calamba
Location
- Location within Metro Manila Location within Luzon Location within Philippines

EDSA station is a railway station located on the South Main Line in Makati, Metro Manila, Philippines. It derives its name from the nearby Epifanio de los Santos Avenue.

EDSA is the eleventh station from Tutuban and is one of three stations serving Makati, the other two being Buendia and Pasay Road, and is the last station to be physically located in Makati before entering Taguig.

The station was rebuilt in 2005 by the Makati City Government as part of the overall redevelopment and beautification of the Magallanes Interchange Park which sits below the interchange. As a result, unlike other stations, EDSA station was not included in the 2009 remodeling of stations as part of PNR's rehabilitation efforts. A product of the prior rehabilitation are the station's lower platforms, which are designed only to accommodate older long-distance trains. For the convenience of passengers, the station has staircases to facilitate the boarding and alighting of passengers on PNR diesel multiple unit trains.

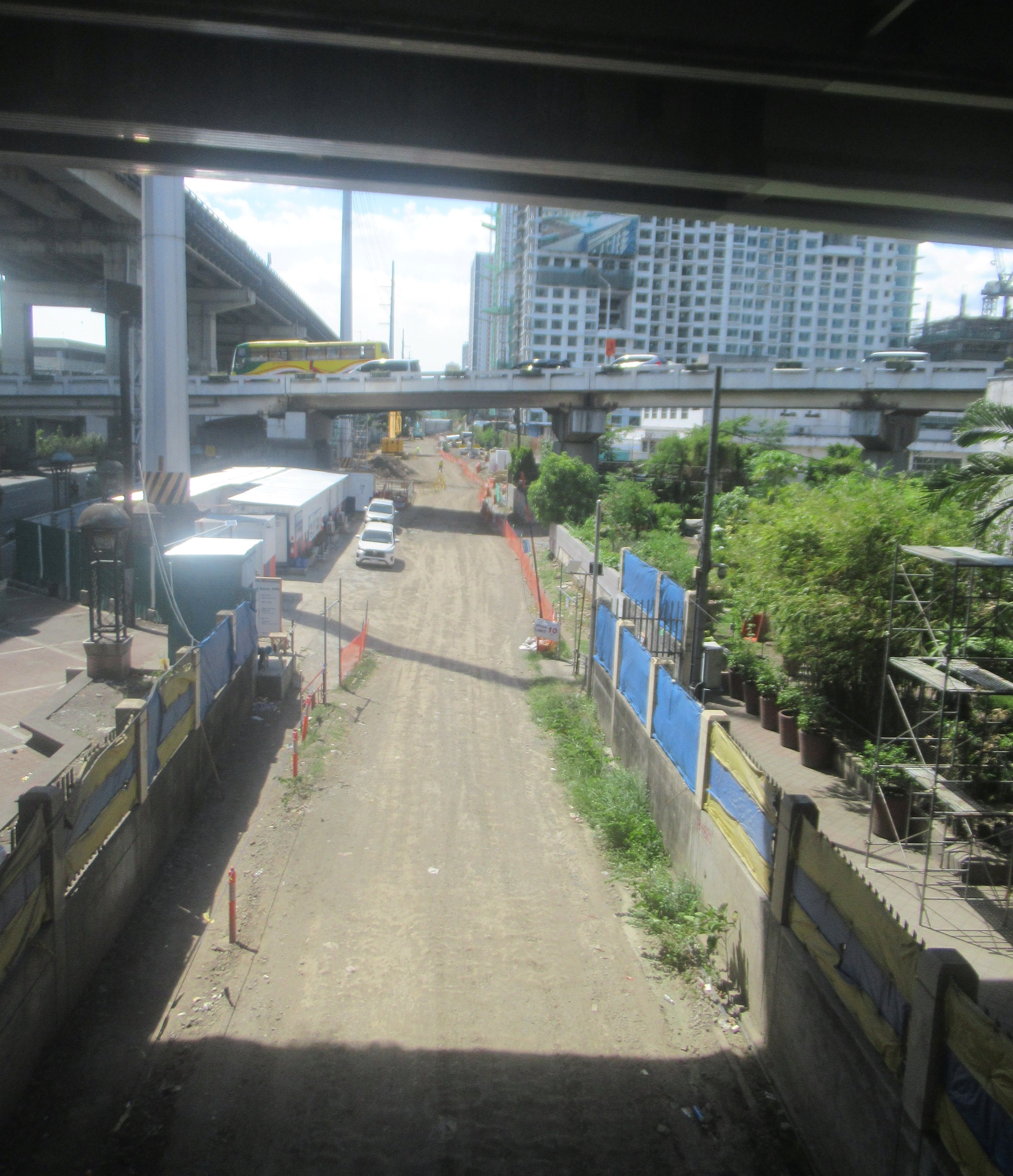
EDSA station demolished as part of the North–South Commuter Railway project

Since September 10, 2018, PNR extended the Caloocan Shuttle Line from Dela Rosa to FTI as its new terminus, thus EDSA station is included in the newly extended line. On March 28, 2024, station operations were temporarily suspended to make way for the construction of the North–South Commuter Railway. The station will be repurposed as an elevated station.

== Nearby landmarks ==
The station's major landmarks are the Alphaland Southgate Tower and Mall, San Lorenzo Place and Mall, and Studio 300 on Chino Roces Avenue. Further away from the station are Bangkal, Paseo de Magallanes, Magallanes Village, Dasmariñas Village, San Lorenzo Village, and Ecology Village.

== Transportation links ==
EDSA station is accessible by jeepneys plying the Chino Roces Avenue and South Luzon Expressway routes, as well as buses plying the South Luzon Expressway route. Unusually for a PNR station, a taxi stand is located outside the station's entrance.

An MRT-3 station, Magallanes, is a short walk from EDSA station.

== Station layout ==
L1; Platforms	Side platform, doors will open on the right
L1; Platforms	Platform A	PNR Metro Commuter towards Tutuban (←)
L1; Platforms	Platform B	PNR Metro Commuter towards Alabang (→)
L1; Platforms	Side platform, doors will open on the right
L1	Concourse/ Street Level	Ticket Booths, Station Control, Shops, Magallanes Interchange Park
