= Paco station =

Railway station in metro Manila, Philippines

Paco
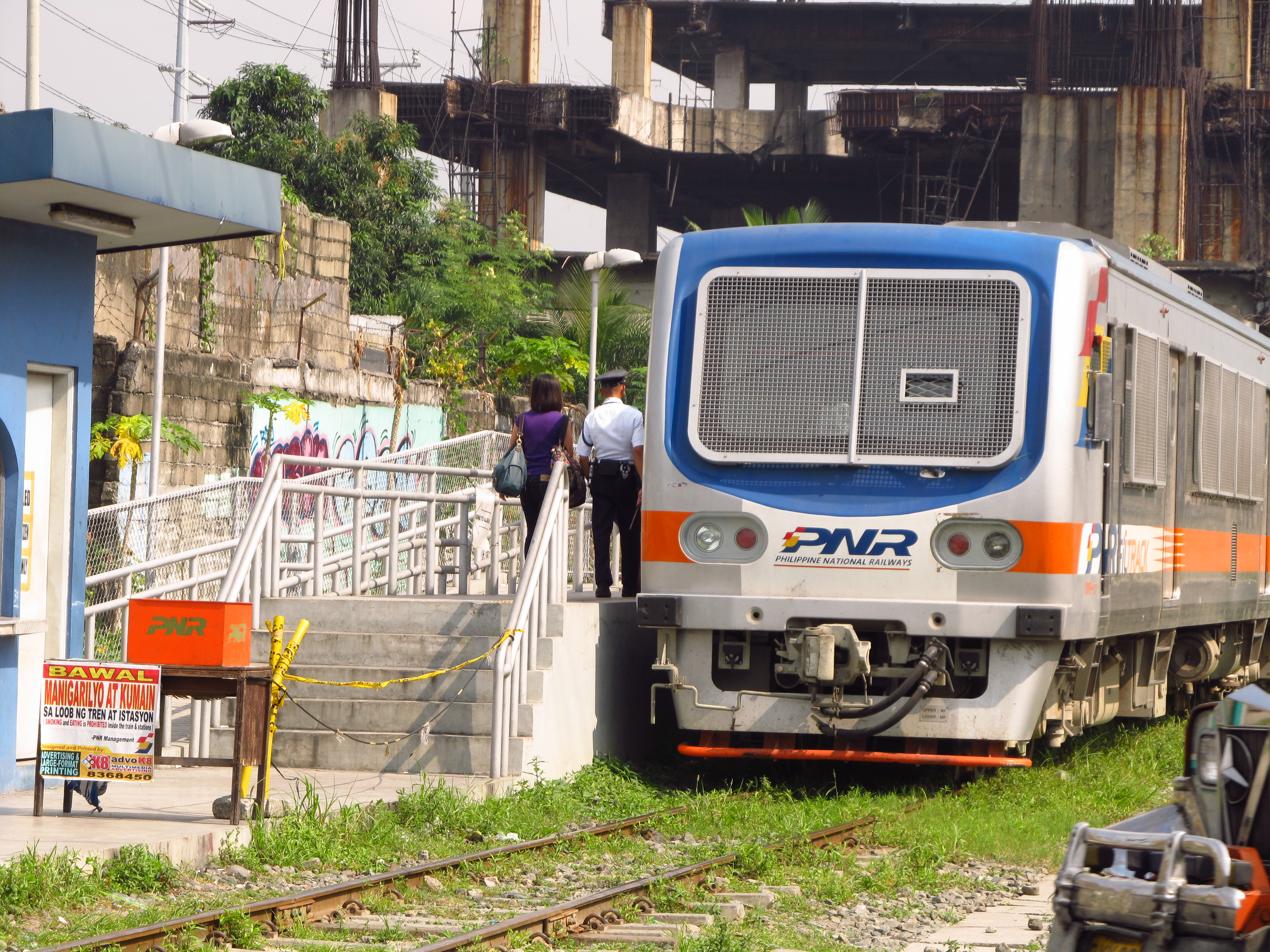
- Platform area of Paco station

General information
- Location: Pedro Gil Street, Paco; Manila, Metro Manila; Philippines
- Coordinates: 14°34′45″N 120°59′57″E
- System: Train station
- Owner: Philippine National Railways
- Operator: Philippine National Railways
- Lines: South Main Line; Planned: South Commuter; Former: Naic and Cavite
- Platforms: 2 side platforms 2 island platforms (NSCR)
- Tracks: 2; 6 (NSCR and SLH)

Construction
- Accessible: yes
- Architect: William E. Parsons (Note: Old Paco station building)
- Architectural style: Beaux-Arts

Other information
- Station code: PC

History
- Opened: March 25, 1908
- Closed: March 28, 2024
- Rebuilt: 2009

Services
Preceding station	PNR	Following station
Santa Mesa towards Governor Pascual	North Shuttle	Dela Rosa towards Bicutan
Pandacan towards Tutuban	Metro South Commuter	San Andres towards IRRI
Future services
Preceding station	PNR	Following station
Santa Mesa towards Clark International Airport	NSCR Commuter CIA–Calamba	Buendia towards Calamba
Santa Mesa towards Tutuban	NSCR Commuter Tutuban–Calamba	Buendia towards Calamba
Location
- Location within Manila Location within Metro Manila Location within Luzon Location within Philippines

Paco station is a railway station located on the South Main Line in the city of Manila, Philippines. It was originally opened by the Manila Railroad Company in 1908 as a major hub in the southern half of Manila, where trains toward Cavite province once operated. The old train station building was designed by William E. Parsons and was completed in 1915. Prior to the electrification plan in the late 1970s, Paco was the southernmost double-track station on the line.

The station eventually lost its significance in the following decades and only the façade remains intact with the interior in a state of decay after a 1996 demolition plan to give way for the construction of a shopping mall. A newer utilitarian platform area has been built for the PNR Metro Commuter Line behind the old station in 2009, using it until 2024. Preservation efforts have been stated since 2015 with the construction of the North–South Commuter Railway.

== History ==
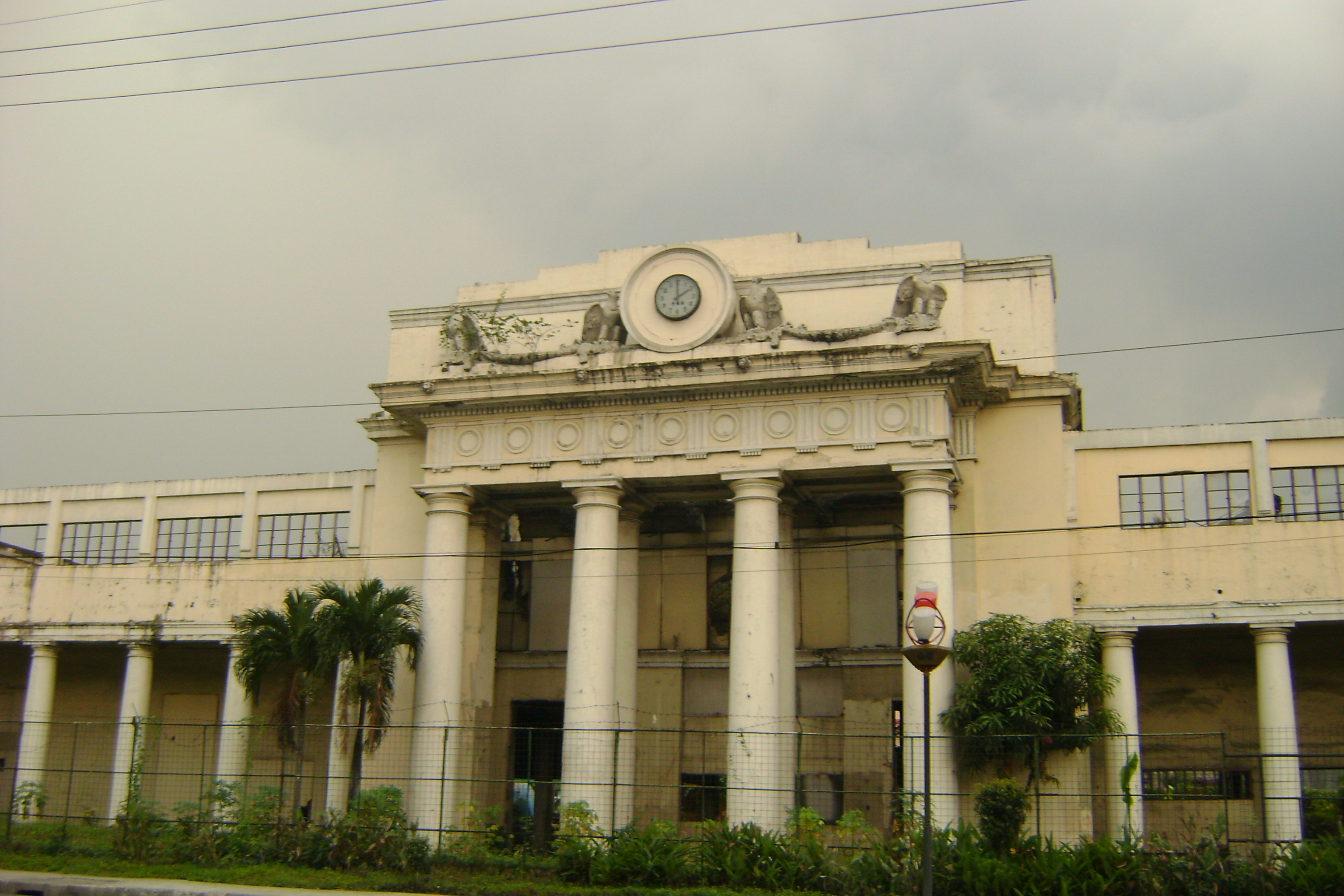
Facade of the old station

=== Early history ===
Paco station was established on March 25, 1908, as a station serving the Manila Belt Line (from Tutuban to Paco) and the now-defunct Cavite Line (then from Paco to Binakayan, Kawit, Cavite). The railroad towards Muntinlupa, then in Rizal, was later inaugurated on June 21, 1908. Construction of the station, which faced Plaza Dilao, began in 1912 and was completed by 1915. What would become the old station building was designed by William E. Parsons, a graduate of the École des Beaux-Arts and the Consulting Architect of the Bureau of Public Works at that time. The Belt Line later gave way to the Manila Railroad's Main Line South in the 1910s.

During the Battle of Manila on February 7, 1945, the United States Army 148th Infantry Regiment crossed the Pasig River from the north and landed in the suburbs of Pandacan and Paco with the Filipino troops under the Philippine Commonwealth Army. A battle took place around the station with some 300 Imperial Japanese Army defending it.

=== Contemporary history ===
The old station fell into disuse in the years following the war. The station was partially demolished in 1996 to make way for a shopping mall in the area. A new station was also built to the southwest as part of PNR's reconstruction in 2009 due to the old station building being unusable.

The Department of Transportation and Communications started plans to restore and conserve the old station building in 2015. Heritage advocates including the Heritage Conservation Society welcomed the development. As of July 2020, the new Paco station shall be built beside the old one with a buffer zone, similar to Seoul Station in South Korea.

On March 28, 2024, station operations were temporarily suspended to make way for the construction of the North–South Commuter Railway (NSCR). The newer platform area was demolished as the station will be repurposed as an elevated station.

According to rendered images of the NSCR, freight tracks belonging to the PNR South Long Haul's northward extension to the Port of Manila will pass through the bottom of the NSCR station and behind the original building.

== Nearby landmarks ==
The station is near Plaza Dilao, Paco Market, San Fernando de Dilao Church, Paco Catholic School, and Colegio de la Inmaculada Concepcion de la Concordia. Plaza Dilao is also where the statue dedicated to Blessed Dom Justo Takayama stands. Skyway Stage 3 passes by the old and new stations.

== See also ==
- Tutuban railway station
