= Pasay Road station =

Railway station in Makati, Philippines

Pasay Road
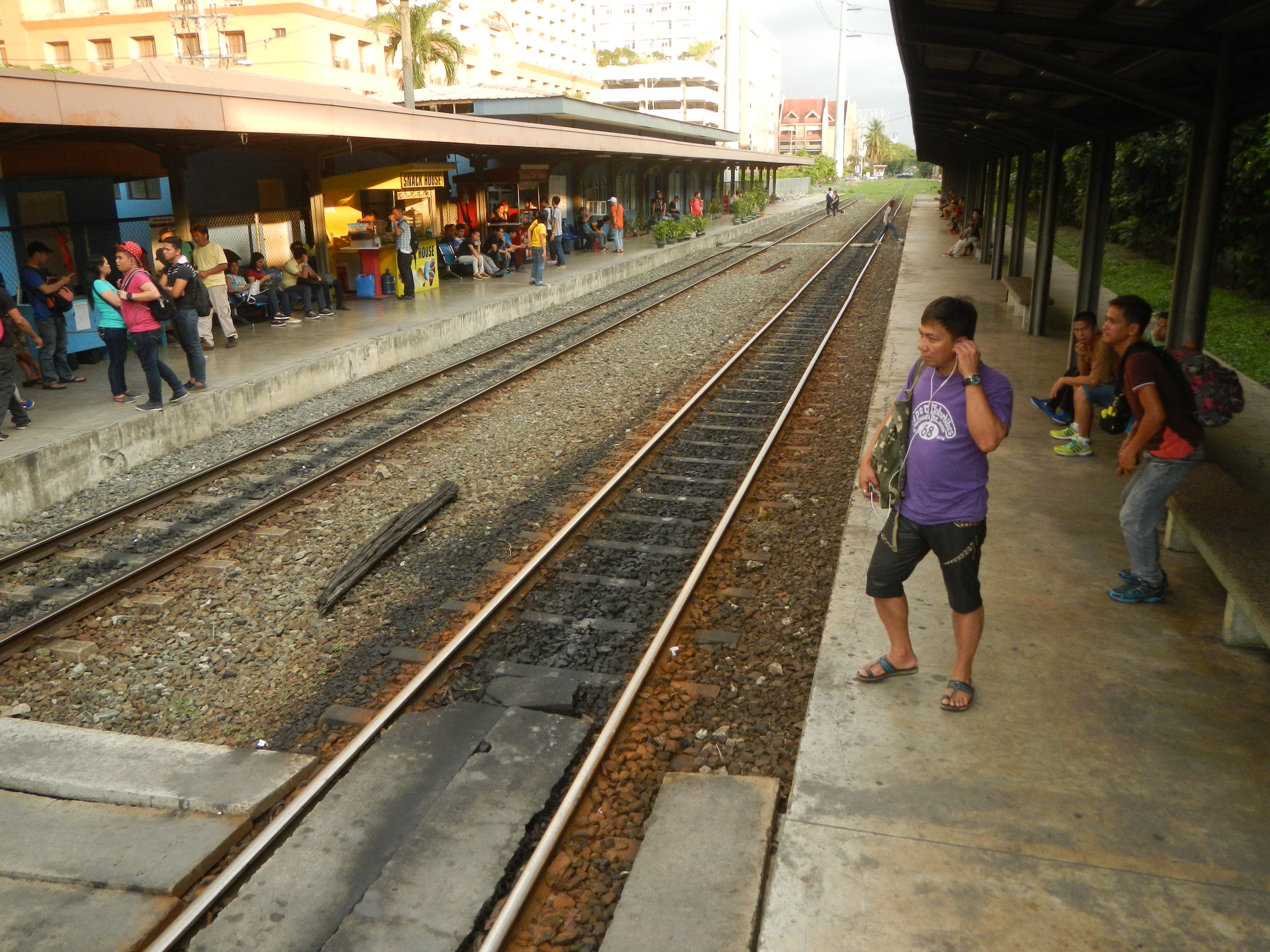
- Station platform of Pasay Road station

General information
- Location: Estacion Street, Pio del Pilar, Makati
- Coordinates: 14°32′58.68″N 121°0′44.22″E
- Owner: Philippine National Railways
- Operator: Philippine National Railways
- Lines: South Main Line; Planned: South Commuter
- Platforms: 1 side platform and 1 island platform
- Tracks: 2, 1 reserve
- Connections: Buses and jeepneys

Construction
- Structure type: At grade
- Parking: Yes (Avida Towers San Lorenzo, WalterMart Makati)
- Accessible: Yes

Other information
- Station code: PRD

History
- Opened: June 21, 1908
- Closed: March 28, 2024
- Rebuilt: 1975 and 2009
- Former names: Culi-culi; Pio del Pilar

Services
Preceding station	PNR	Following station
Dela Rosa towards Tutuban	Metro South Commuter	EDSA towards IRRI
España towards Tutuban	Bicol Express	Alabang towards Legazpi
España towards Tutuban	Isarog Limited	Alabang towards Naga
Location
- Location within Metro Manila Location within Luzon Location within Philippines

Pasay Road station was a railway station located on the South Main Line in Makati, Metro Manila, Philippines. It was one of two stations (the other is Santa Mesa) in the line to have its own access road. It was named after Pasay Road, the old name of the Makati section of the adjacent Arnaiz Avenue.

The station was the tenth station from Tutuban and was one of three stations serving Makati, the other two being Dela Rosa and EDSA. It was the only station in Makati, and the only station between España and Alabang, which serves intercity trains, being a stopping point for the Bicol Express and Mayon Limited.

In addition to having its own dedicated access road, Pasay Road station was also one of three stations (the others being Santa Mesa and España) to have its original platforms extended and raised in order to accommodate new PNR diesel multiple units. The original platforms have been retained for the use of Commuter Express locomotives and especially for intercity trains.

== Nearby landmarks ==
The station was adjacent to Waltermart Makati, the Don Bosco Technical Institute, St. John Bosco Parish Church, Wilcon Depot Pasong Tamo, and several condominium developments such as the Cityland Pasong Tamo Tower, Laureano Di Trevi Towers, and Avida Towers San Lorenzo. Further away from the station are Makati Cinema Square, San Lorenzo Village, San Ildefonso Parish Church, Ayala Center, the Makati Central Business District, Ayala Museum, other condominium developments such as The Shang Grand Tower, the BSA Tower, The Beacon, and The Columns Legazpi Village.

== Transportation links ==
Pasay Road station is accessible by jeepneys plying the Chino Roces and Arnaiz Avenue routes, as well as buses plying the South Luzon Expressway route.

== History ==
Pasay Road was opened on June 21, 1908 as Culi-culi station, named after the barrio of the same name (the present-day Barangay Pio del Pilar) where it is located. Originally part of the Batangas Line, it is the first railroad station in Makati, which was then a town named San Pedro [de] Macati in Rizal. It also served as the terminal of the defunct Manila Railroad branch towards Nielson Field. A wooden station building and raised elevation was built in 1924, while the yard trackage was increased.

The station building and platforms were renovated in 1975 as Pio Del Pilar station, following the track duplication of the line from Paco up to this station. The track duplication of the line was further extended, reaching Sucat by 1978.

A new platform was built in 2009 north of the old station building.

On March 28, 2024, station operations were suspended to make way for the construction of the North–South Commuter Railway. The station building was later demolished.

== Station layout ==
L1; Platforms	Side platform, doors will open on the right
L1; Platforms	Platform A	PNR Metro Commuter towards Tutuban (←)
L1; Platforms	Platform B	PNR Metro Commuter towards Alabang (→)
L1; Platforms	Island platform, doors will open on either the left or the right
L1; Platforms	Platform B	PNR Metro Commuter towards Tutuban (←) or Alabang (→)
L1	Concourse/ Street Level	Ticket Booths, Station Control, Shops, The Columns Legazpi Village, Cityland Pasong Tamo Tower, Avida Towers San Lorenzo, Waltermart Makati, The Beacon, Don Bosco Technical Institute
