= FTI station =

Southrail railway station in Metro Manila, Philippines

FTI
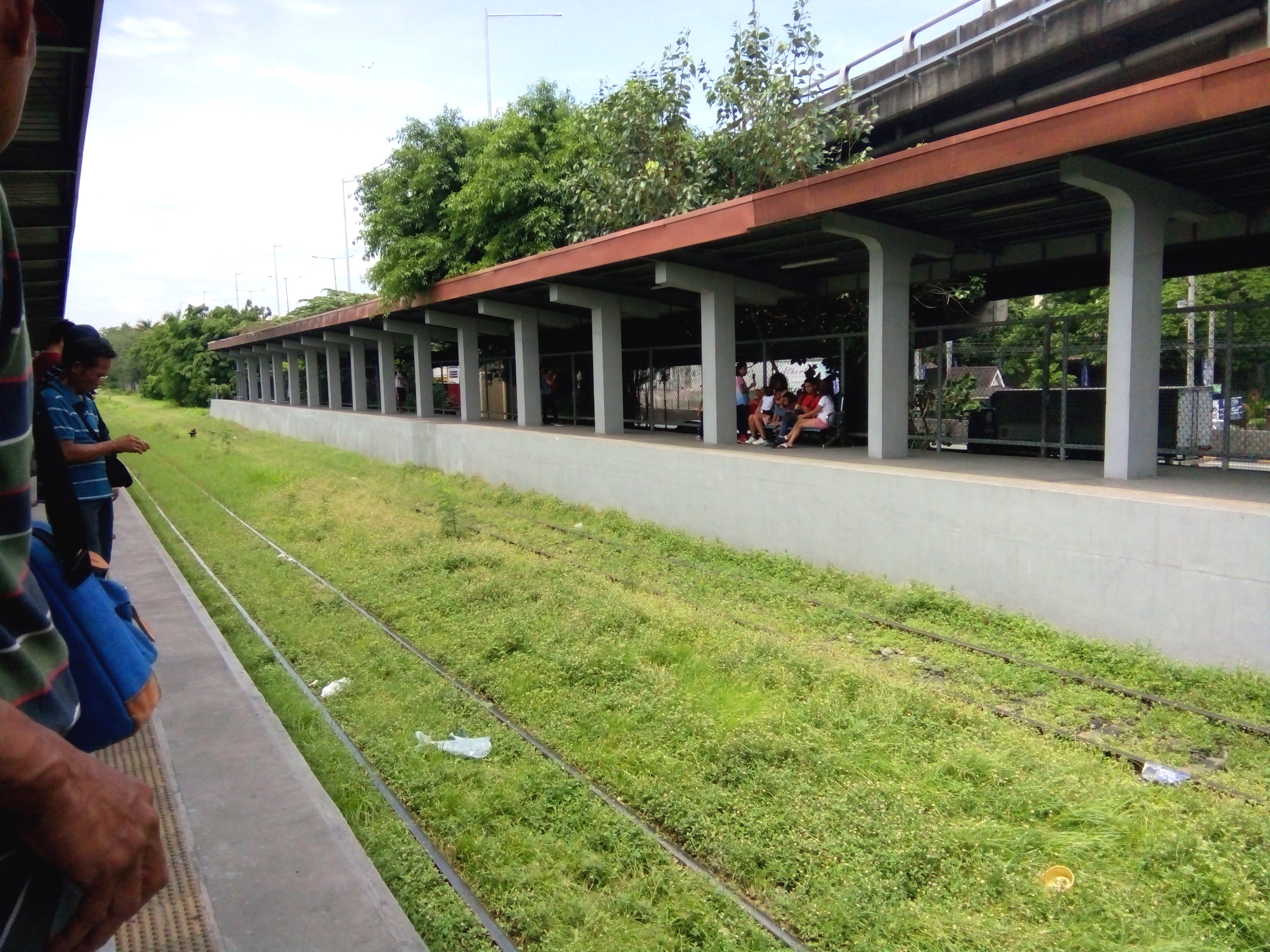
- Platform area of FTI station.

General information
- Other names: Arca South
- Location: East Service Road, Western Bicutan; Taguig, Metro Manila; Philippines
- Coordinates: 14°30′24.48″N 121°2′7.31″E
- Owner: Philippine National Railways
- Operator: Philippine National Railways
- Lines: South Main Line; Planned: South Commuter
- Platforms: Side platforms
- Tracks: 2
- Connections: AS01 Arca South; Future: MMS FTI; Taguig City Integrated Terminal Exchange

Construction
- Structure type: At grade
- Accessible: yes

Other information
- Station code: BL15 (Metro Manila Subway)

History
- Opened: January 19, 1977; 49 years ago
- Closed: March 28, 2024; 2 years ago
- Rebuilt: 2009; 17 years ago
- Former names: Food Terminal Junction

Services
Preceding station	PNR	Following station
EDSA towards Governor Pascual	North Shuttle	Terminus
Nichols towards Tutuban	Metro South Commuter	Bicutan towards IRRI
Future services
Preceding station	PNR	Following station
Buendia towards Clark International Airport	Airport Limited Express	Sucat towards Alabang
Senate–DepEd towards Clark International Airport	NSCR Commuter CIA–Calamba	Bicutan towards Calamba
Senate–DepEd towards Tutuban	NSCR Commuter Tutuban–Calamba	Bicutan towards Calamba
EDSA towards Clark International Airport	Commuter Express CIA–Calamba	Sucat towards Calamba
EDSA towards Tutuban	Commuter Express Tutuban–Calamba	Sucat towards Calamba
Preceding station	Manila MRT	Following station
Senate–DepEd towards East Valenzuela	Metro Manila Subway	Bicutan towards Calamba
Location
- Location within Metro Manila Location within Luzon Location within Philippines

FTI station (also called Food Terminal Junction station) is a railway station located on the South Main Line in Taguig, Metro Manila, Philippines. It is named after its major landmark, the grounds of the formerly state-owned Food Terminal, Inc. which is now renamed as Arca South.

The station is the thirteenth station from Tutuban and is one of two stations serving Taguig, the other station being Nichols.

== History ==
The station was opened on January 19, 1977, as Food Terminal Junction station, replacing the now-defunct Balagbag station that was located few meters northwest. In 2018, PNR extended the North Shuttle Line southwards from Dela Rosa to FTI as its new terminus, effectively starting on September 10, while northwards from Caloocan to Governor Pascual started on December 3. On March 28, 2024, station operations were temporarily suspended to make way for the construction of the North–South Commuter Railway. It will be repurposed as an elevated station.

== Nearby landmarks ==
The station is near major landmarks such as the Ayala Land development Arca South, Technological University of the Philippines-Taguig Campus, the Sunshine Mall, the Taguig-Pateros District Hospital, a major warehouse of the National Food Authority and, most notably the Fort Bonifacio Tenement. Further away from the station are the Western Bicutan National High School and Signal Village.

== Transportation links ==
FTI station is accessible by jeepneys plying routes on the East Service Road, as well as jeeps entering the FTI complex. In the future, the station will also be integrated with the proposed Taguig City Integrated Terminal Exchange, as well as the planned Metro Manila Subway.
