= Nichols station =

Commuter rail stop in Taguig, Metro Manila

Nichols
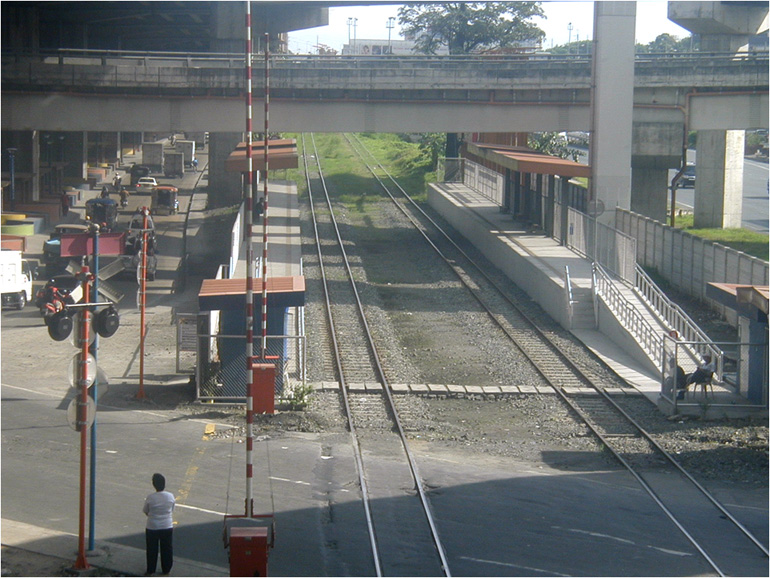
- Platform area of Nichols station.

General information
- Other names: Senate–DepEd (from 2032)
- Location: East Service Road, Western Bicutan; Taguig, Metro Manila; Philippines
- Coordinates: 14°31′26.04″N 121°1′34.10″E
- Owner: Philippine National Railways
- Operator: Philippine National Railways
- Lines: South Main Line; Planned: South Commuter
- Platforms: Side platforms
- Tracks: 2

Construction
- Structure type: At grade
- Accessible: yes

Other information
- Station code: BL14 (Metro Manila Subway)

History
- Opened: 1946 (flagstop); March 25, 2010; 16 years ago
- Closed: March 28, 2024; 2 years ago
- Former names: Bonifacio–Villamor; Metro Manila Subway: Cayetano Boulevard (original plan before splitting into two), Lawton West

Services
Preceding station	PNR	Following station
EDSA towards Tutuban	Metro South Commuter	FTI towards IRRI

Other services
Preceding station	PNR	Following station
EDSA towards Clark International Airport	NSCR Commuter CIA–Calamba	FTI towards Calamba
EDSA towards Tutuban	NSCR Commuter Tutuban–Calamba	FTI towards Calamba
EDSA towards Clark International Airport	Commuter Express CIA–Calamba	Sucat towards Calamba
EDSA towards Tutuban	Commuter Express Tutuban–Calamba	Sucat towards Calamba
Preceding station	Manila MRT	Following station
Lawton towards East Valenzuela	Metro Manila Subway	FTI towards Calamba
Lawton towards East Valenzuela	Metro Manila Subway	NAIA Terminal 3 Terminus
Location
- Location within Metro Manila Location within Luzon Location within Philippines

Nichols station (formerly Bonifacio–Villamor station, and from 2032 to be referred as Senate–DepEd station) is a railway station located on the South Main Line in Taguig, Metro Manila, Philippines, near the city's boundary with Pasay. It derives its name from one of the area's popular nicknames, Nichols, which is also the former name of Villamor Air Base. It was opened for revenue service on March 25, 2010. Station operations is temporarily suspended since March 28, 2024, to make way for the construction of the North–South Commuter Railway (NSCR). It will be repurposed as an elevated station that will serve both the NSCR and Metro Manila Subway.

The station is the twelfth station from Tutuban and is one of two stations serving Taguig, the other station being FTI.

== Nearby landmarks ==
Aside being near both Villamor Airbase and Fort Bonifacio, it is also near Terminal 3 of Ninoy Aquino International Airport, Newport City, the headquarters of the Technical Education and Skills Development Authority (TESDA) and the Libingan ng mga Bayani. Further away from the station are the Philippine State College of Aeronautics, the Pasay City South High School, Magallanes Village in Makati, the Manila American Cemetery and Memorial, The Heritage Memorial Park, the Bonifacio Global City, McKinley Hill, and McKinley West.

== Transportation links ==
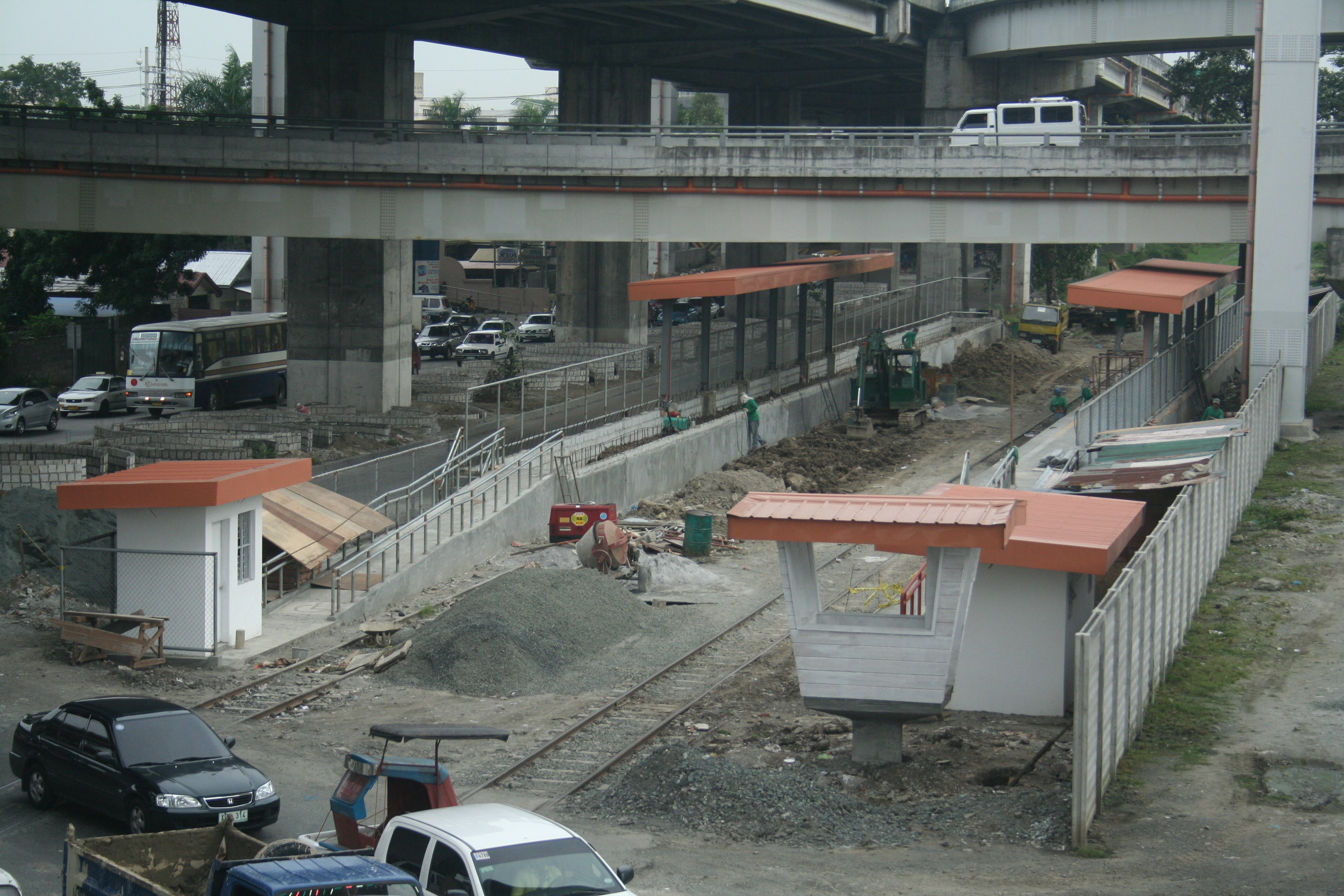
Nichols station under construction in 2009

Nichols station is accessible by jeepneys plying routes on the East Service Road, Lawton Avenue (the road which leads to Fort Bonifacio) and Sales Road (the road which leads to Villamor Airbase), as well as buses plying these routes.

== Future ==
This station shall be rebuilt as part of the North–South Commuter Railway project. A new station shall be built to the north of the Sales Interchange where the present one is. To be named Senate–DepEd station, it will be constructed behind the Department of Social Welfare and Development's Social Welfare and Development Center for Asia and the Pacific (SWADCAP) site, which will eventually become the future Department of Education (DepEd) complex, and shall also serve the adjacent New Senate Building. The station will be built as an elevated building and will have two tracks and side platforms. However, Senate–DepEd is not expected to be part of a single interchange with the Metro Manila Subway station of the same name. The entire NSCR system which includes the new Senate station, was expected to open by 2028. However, it was postponed to 2032.

== Station layout ==
L1; Platforms	Side platform, doors will open on the right
L1; Platforms	Platform A	PNR Metro Commuter towards Tutuban (←)
L1; Platforms	Platform B	PNR Metro Commuter towards Alabang (→)
L1; Platforms	Side platform, doors will open on the right
L1	Concourse/ Street Level	Ticket Booths, Station Control, Shops, Sales Interchange
