= Exportbank Plaza =

Skyscraper in Makati, Philippines

General information
- Type: Office
- Location: Gil Puyat Avenue cor. Chino Roces Avenue, Makati, Philippines
- Coordinates: 14°33′33.50″N 121°0′41.77″E
- Completed: 1998
- Opening: 1998

Height
- Roof: 155.1 m (508.86 ft)

Technical details
- Floor count: 36 above ground, 1 below ground

Design and construction
- Architect: R. Villarosa Architects
- Developer: Geo Estate Estate Development Corporation, New Pacific Resources Management, Inc.
- Structural engineer: Aromin & Sy + Associates
- Main contractor: EEI Corporation

Exportbank Plaza, formerly known as Urban Bank Plaza, is an office skyscraper located in Makati, Philippines. It stands at 155.1 meters (509 ft), and is one of the tallest buildings in the country. The building has 36 floors above ground and 1 basement level for parking.

Currently, Exportbank Plaza serves as the headquarters of Export and Industry Bank (Exportbank), which acquired the building after purchasing the assets of Urban Bank after that bank was shut down by the Bangko Sentral ng Pilipinas in 2000.

== Location ==
The building is located at the corner of Gil Puyat Avenue and Chino Roces Avenue in Makati, the tower is situated near the entrance of the Makati Central Business District. It is a few blocks walk away from most of Makati's other major office and residential buildings.

== Building Details ==
The 37-storey building consists of an 8-floor Podium with basement, and a 29-storey Office Tower. It has a 3-street frontage (Gil Puyat Avenue, Chino Roces Avenue, and Urban Avenue) and was designed to ensure unobstructed panoramic view of the metropolis from all sides, with Makati's skyline towards the east, and Manila Bay towards the west.

The building also has 7 parking floors for a total of 511 parking slots, or 1 parking space for every 80sqm of office space. 12 high-speed elevators are installed to ensure swift access to all levels.

Each floor has two pressurized fire escape stairways with widths of 1.35 meters, higher than the standard 1.20 meters of comparable structures. Every floor is also equipped with a smoke exhaust louver system which automatically activates in case of fire. Also, the building is also crowned with a helipad.

== Transfer of ownership ==
It was reported on March 10, 2009, that Exportbank sold its rights and interest on Exportbank Plaza to Arthaland Inc. (formerly known as EIB Realty Developers Inc.) for Php 2.62 Billion (around US$54.188 Million).
