= Tutuban station =

Train terminal in Manila

Tutuban
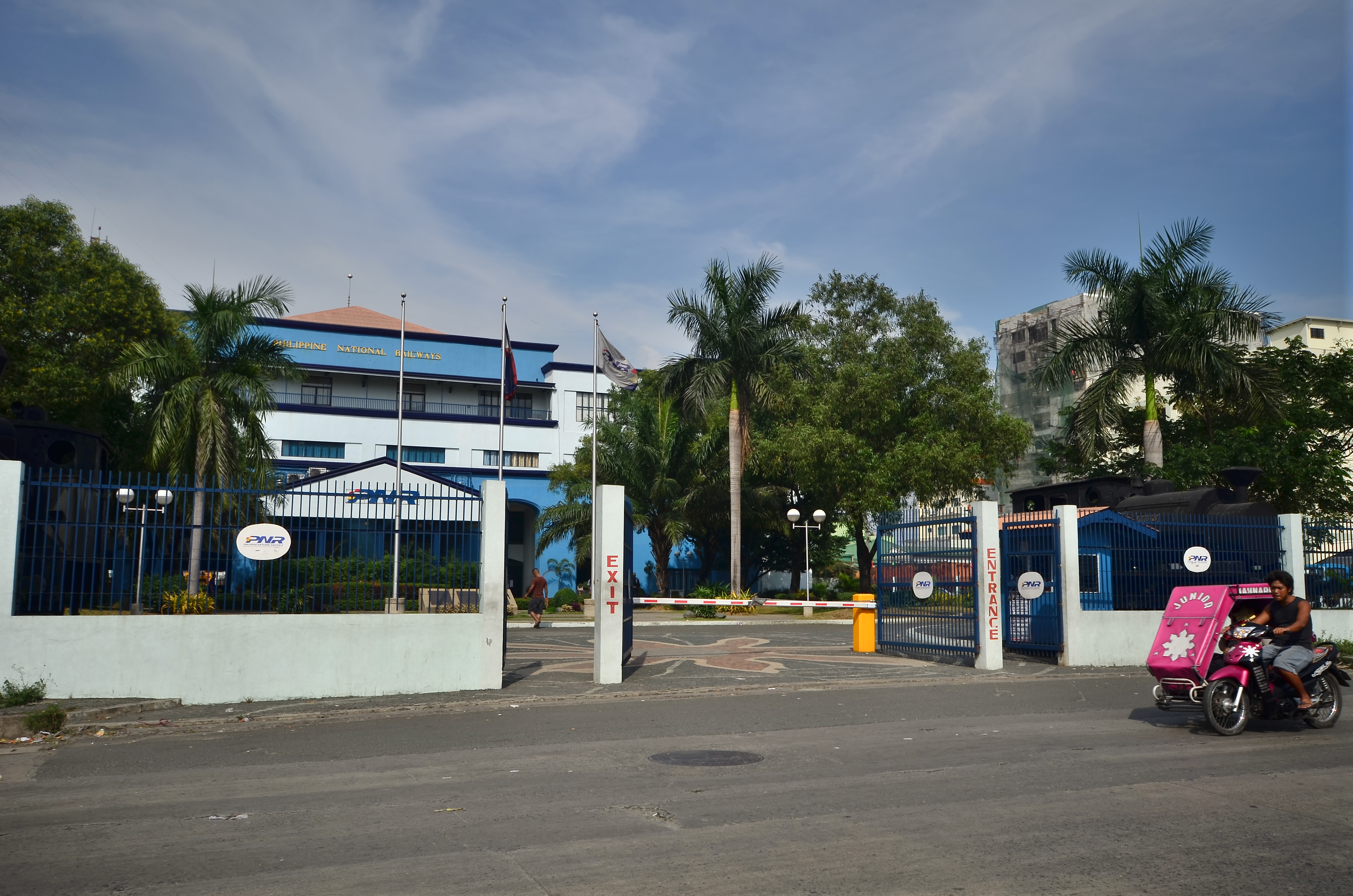
- Exterior of the PNR Executive Building on Mayhaligue Street, which currently serves as the Tutuban railway station terminal.

General information
- Other names: Manila, Tayuman, Divisoria
- Location: Mayhaligue Street, Tondo; Manila, Metro Manila; Philippines
- Coordinates: 14°36′41″N 120°58′24″E
- Owner: Department of Transportation
- Operator: Philippine National Railways
- Lines: North Main Line; South Main Line; Planned: North–South Commuter
- Platforms: 3 island platforms
- Tracks: 6
- Connections: Victory Liner Bus Terminal; Jeepneys, tricycles, FX, taxis Future: Tutuban

Construction
- Parking: Yes
- Cycle facilities: Bicycle parking available
- Accessible: Yes

Other information
- Station code: TU (commuter); MA (intercity)

History
- Opened: March 24, 1891; 135 years ago
- Rebuilt: 1996; 30 years ago
- Former names: Central Station

Services
Preceding station	PNR	Following station
Solis towards Governor Pascual	Metro North Commuter	Terminus
Terminus	Metro South Commuter	Blumentritt towards IRRI
Terminus	Bicol Express	Blumentritt towards Legazpi
Future services
Preceding station	PNR	Following station
Solis towards New Clark City	NSCR Commuter NCC–Tutuban	Terminus
Terminus	NSCR Commuter Tutuban–Calamba	Blumentritt towards Calamba
Caloocan towards New Clark City	Commuter Express NCC–Tutuban	Terminus
Terminus	Commuter Express Tutuban–Calamba	Blumentritt towards Calamba
Location
- Location within Manila Location within Metro Manila Location within Luzon Location within Philippines

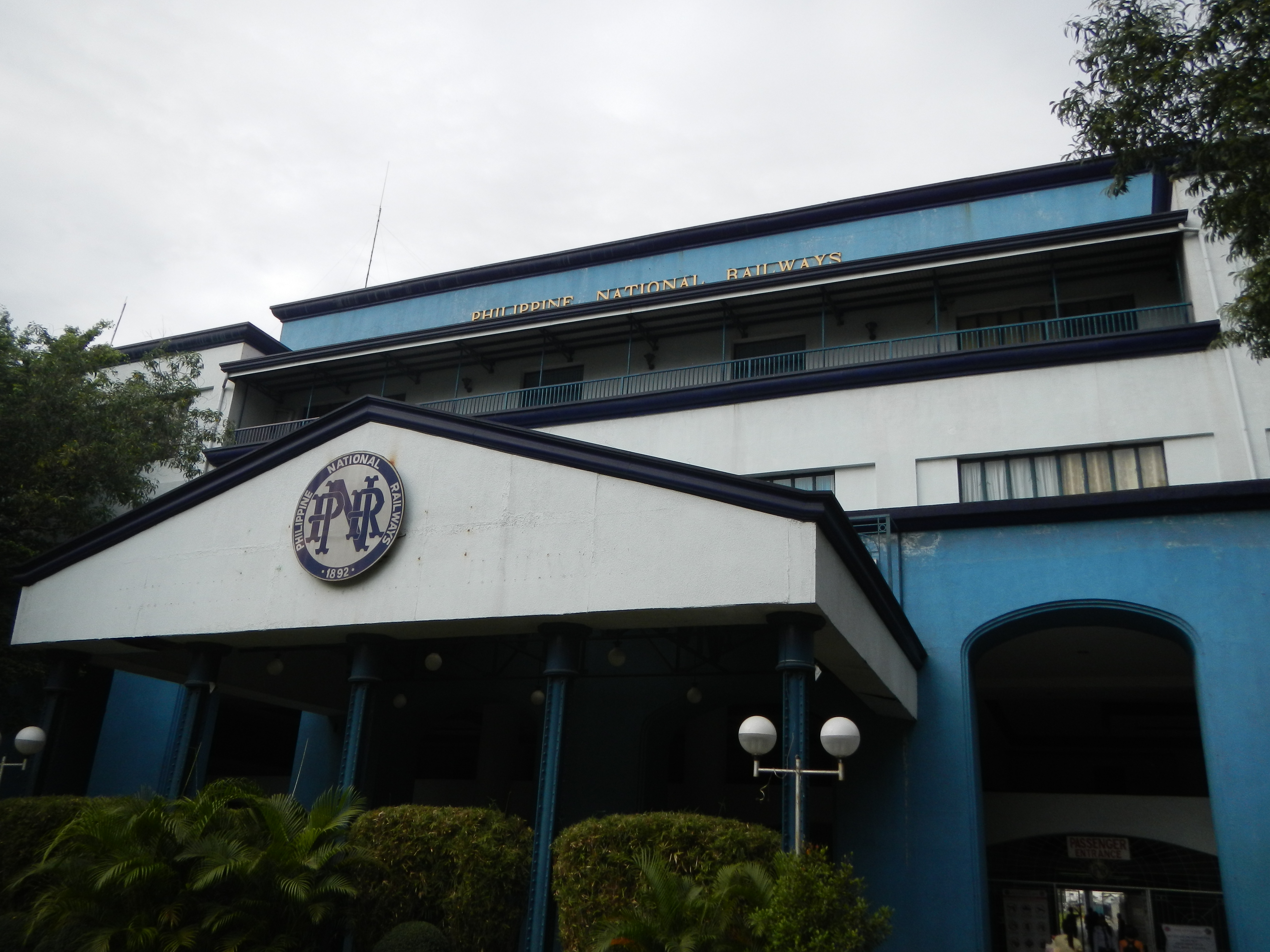
Current Tutuban station building.

Tutuban station (also known as Manila station or Divisoria station) is the central railway terminus of the Philippine National Railways (PNR) network located in the city of Manila, Philippines.

The name refers to two stations: the original Tutuban station, which today forms part of Tutuban Center, and the PNR Executive Building, which houses PNR offices.

== History ==
Tutuban station was built as part of the "Ferrocarril de Manila-Dagupan" or the Manila-Dagupan Line, which constitutes much of the North Main Line today. The cornerstone of the main station building at Tutuban was laid on July 31, 1887. The railway was 195 kilometers (121 mi) long at the time of its opening on November 24, 1892, running from Manila to Dagupan in Pangasinan. The Manila Railroad Company (MRR) was renamed Philippine National Railways (PNR) under Republic Act No. 4156 enacted after World War II.

In 1988, PNR evaluated the possibility of renting 22 hectares (54 acres) of land to Tutuban at C.M. Recto Avenue in response to the challenges of development and help promote the site to be the center of trade. PNR implemented the first part of the master development plan of Tutuban Properties, Inc. in 1991, and later entrusted the management and development of the land. The Tutuban Center Mall was formally inaugurated to the public led by President Fidel V. Ramos on February 21, 1994.

The following years have witnessed the continued efforts among PNR, Tutuban Properties, Inc., and the Philippine Government to advance the methods of travel by reorganizing the overall railroad system, improve the civic and business buildings around the Tutuban, and keep the emphasis on history. The development of PNR Plaza is a step to verify the cause of reactivating the overall railroad system as one method of travel and trading.

The Tutuban Station Executive Building was inaugurated on May 30, 1996.

Tutuban station will be renovated to become more transit-oriented and a newer station will be built for the North–South Commuter Railway. According to a presentation by JICA in 2019, the old station building nicknamed the "Heritage Building" will be once more included in a transit-oriented mixed-use zone. Therefore, the Tutuban Center Mall that sits in the area of the station will be removed. It will also connect to the LRT Line 2 for ease of transferring between lines.

== Gallery ==
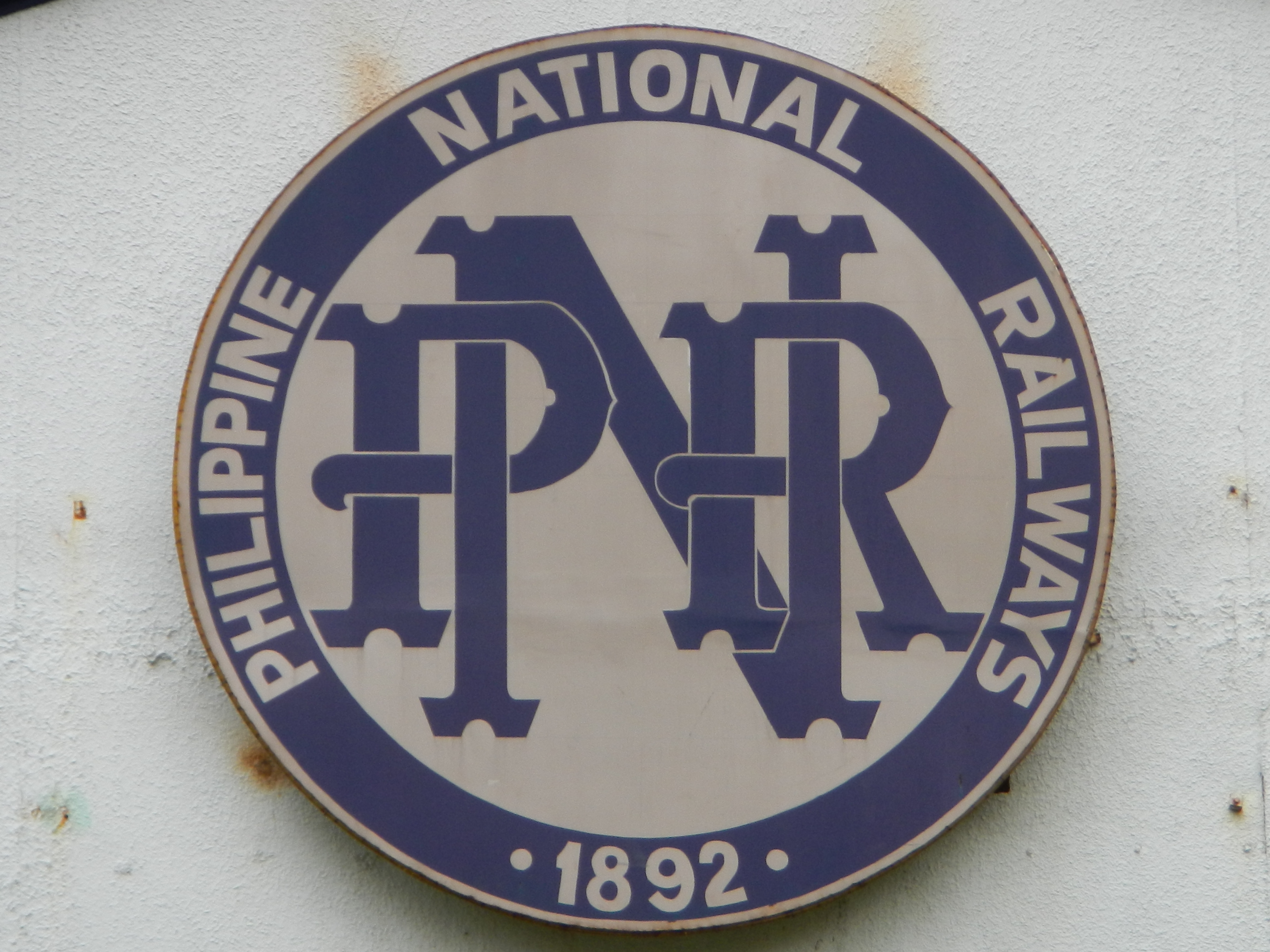
Philippine National Railways seal

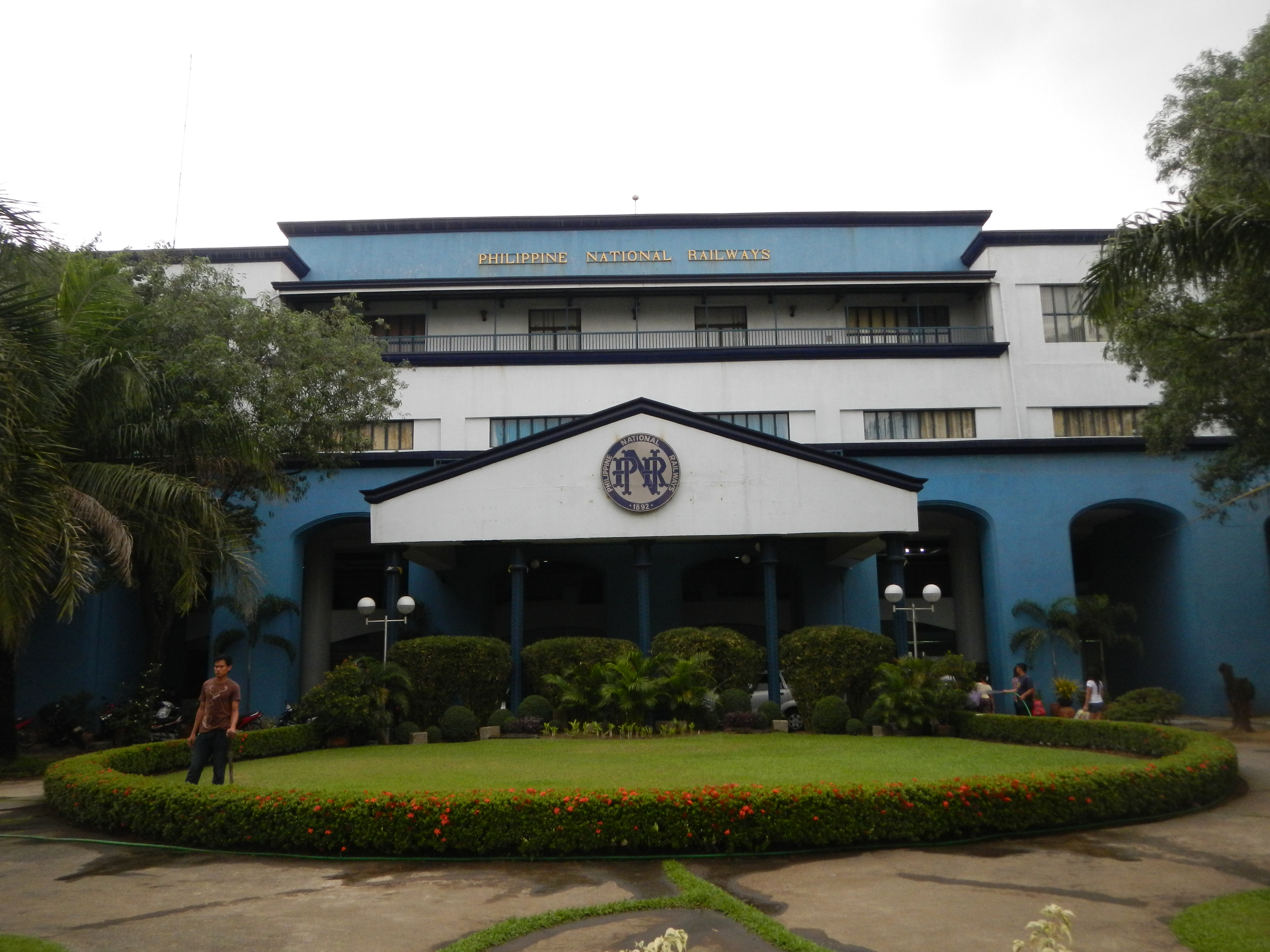
Façade

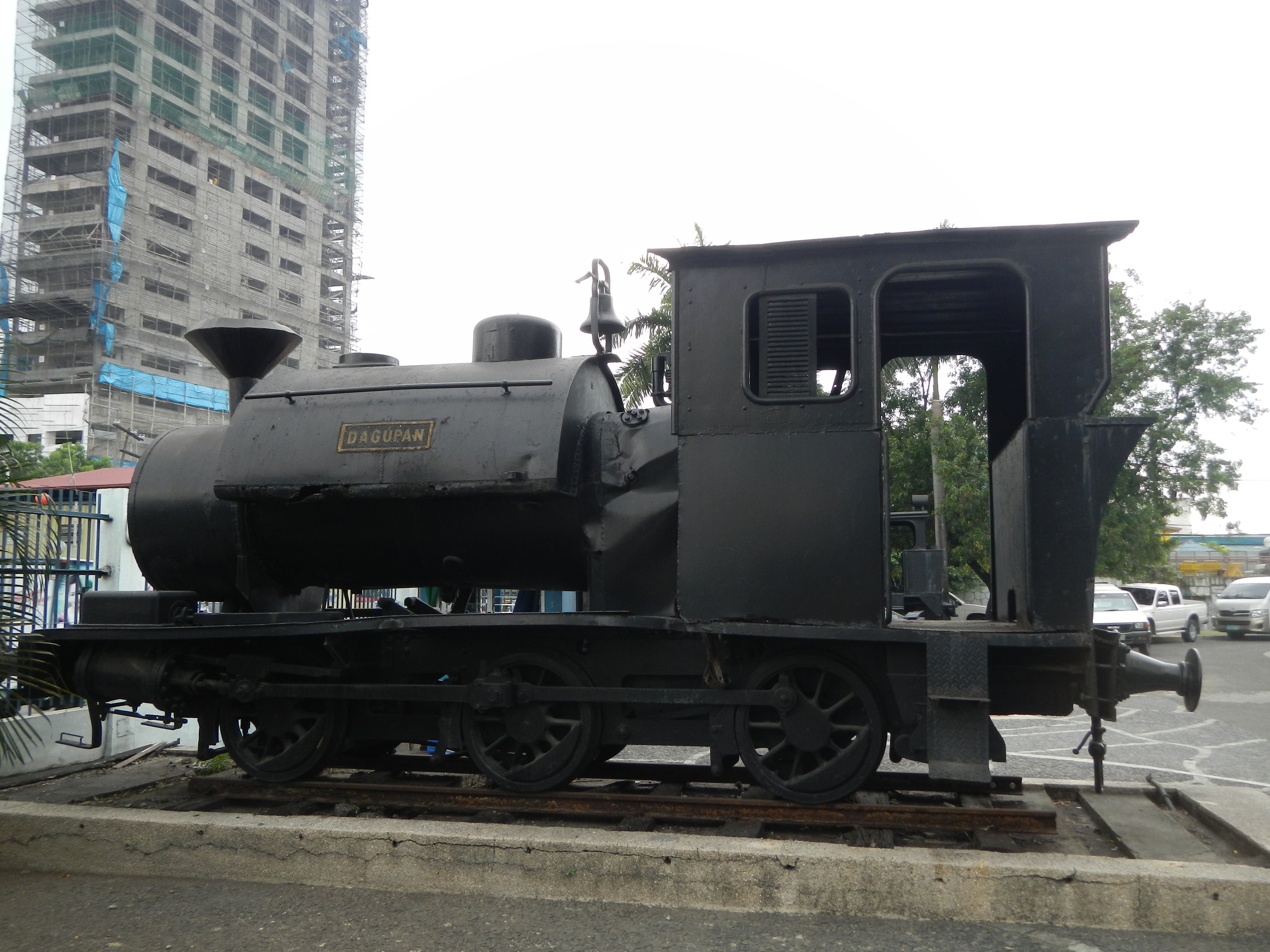
Vintage 0-6-0 "Dagupan" steam locomotive

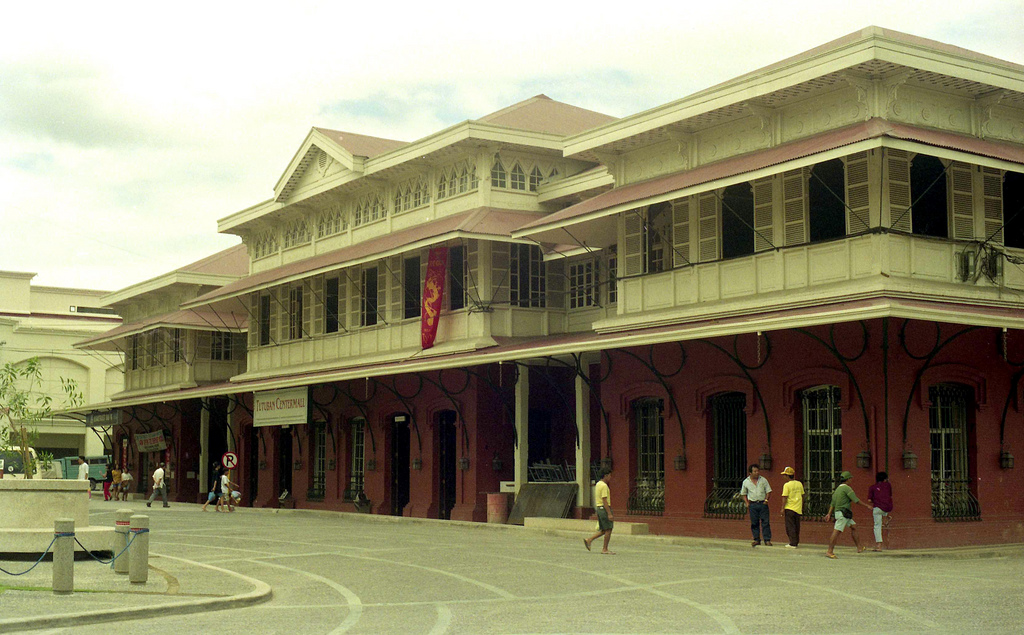
Exterior of the original Tutuban station built in 1892, which today is part of Tutuban Center

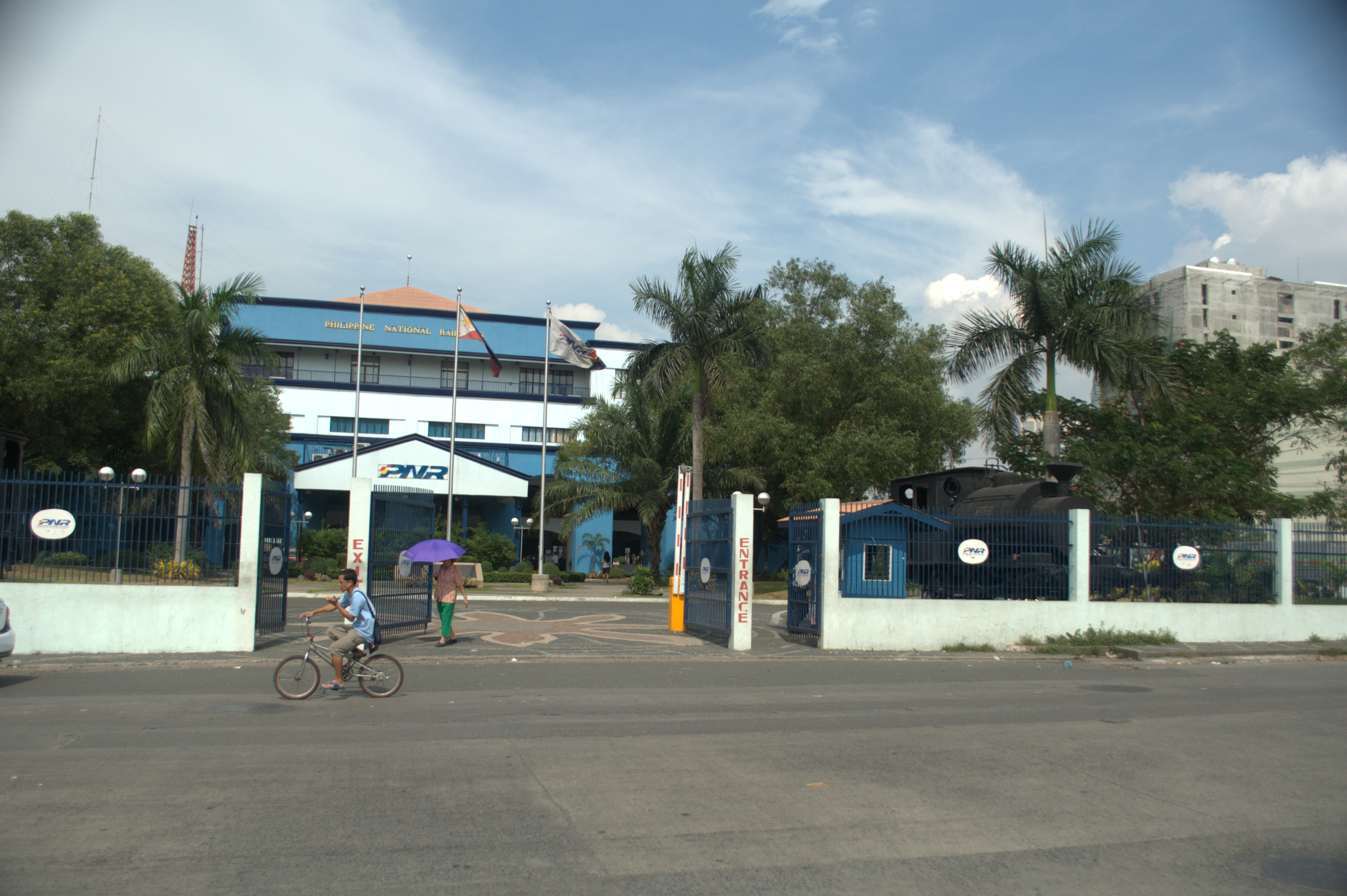
Façade of the PNR Tutuban station

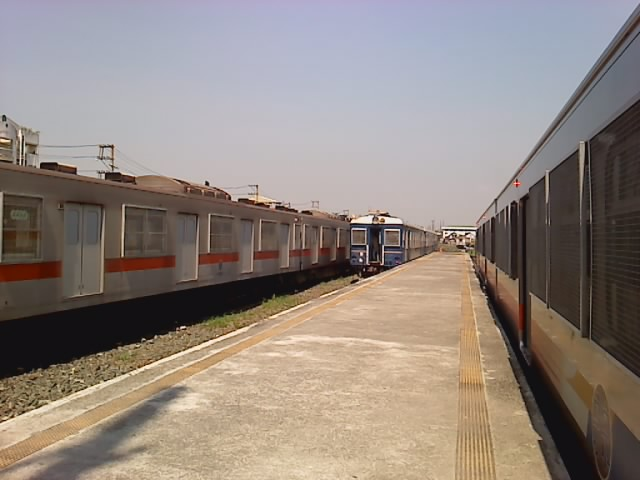
Platform 2

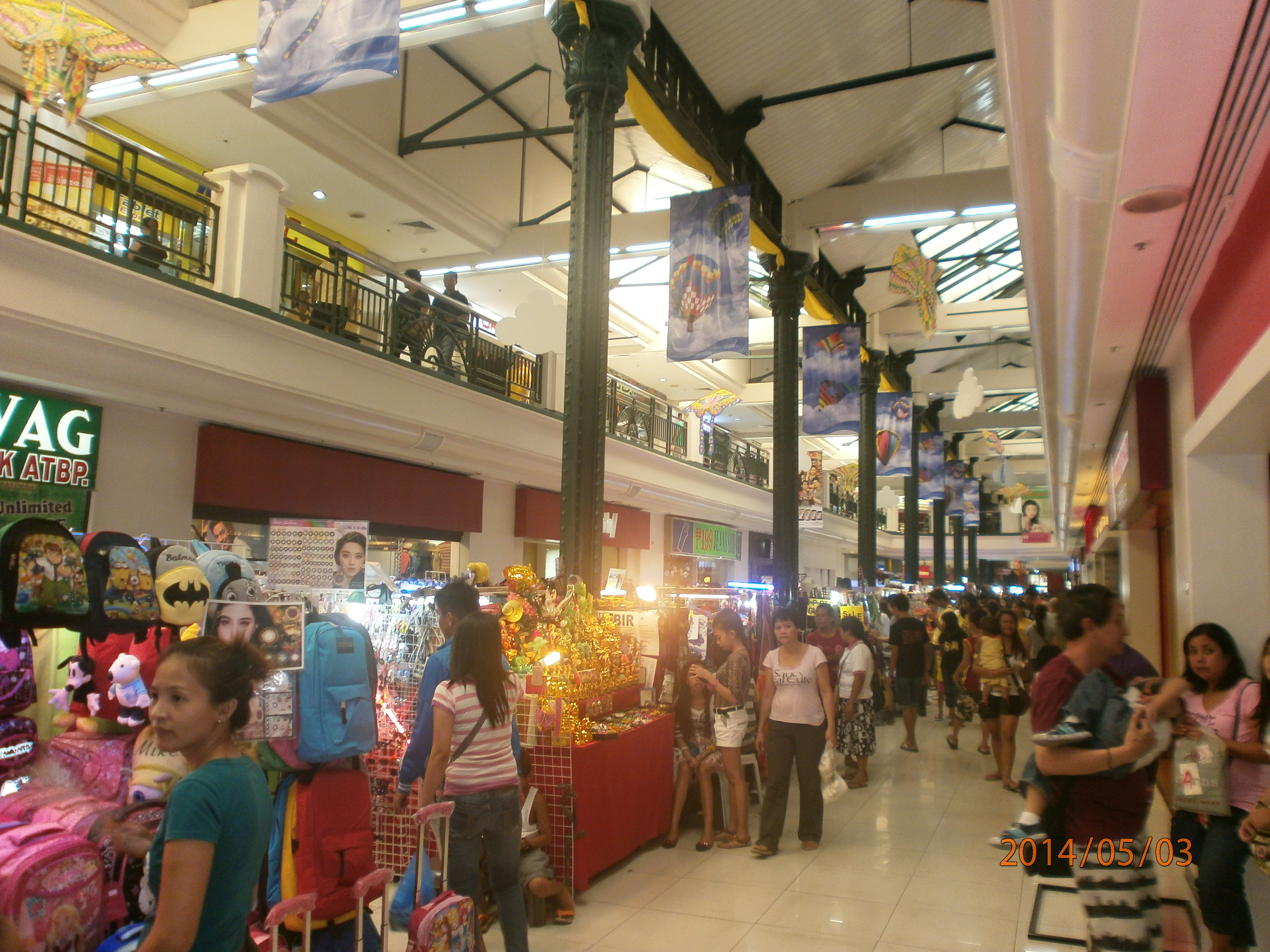
Interior of Tutuban Center Main Building with the existing columns of the old Tutuban station

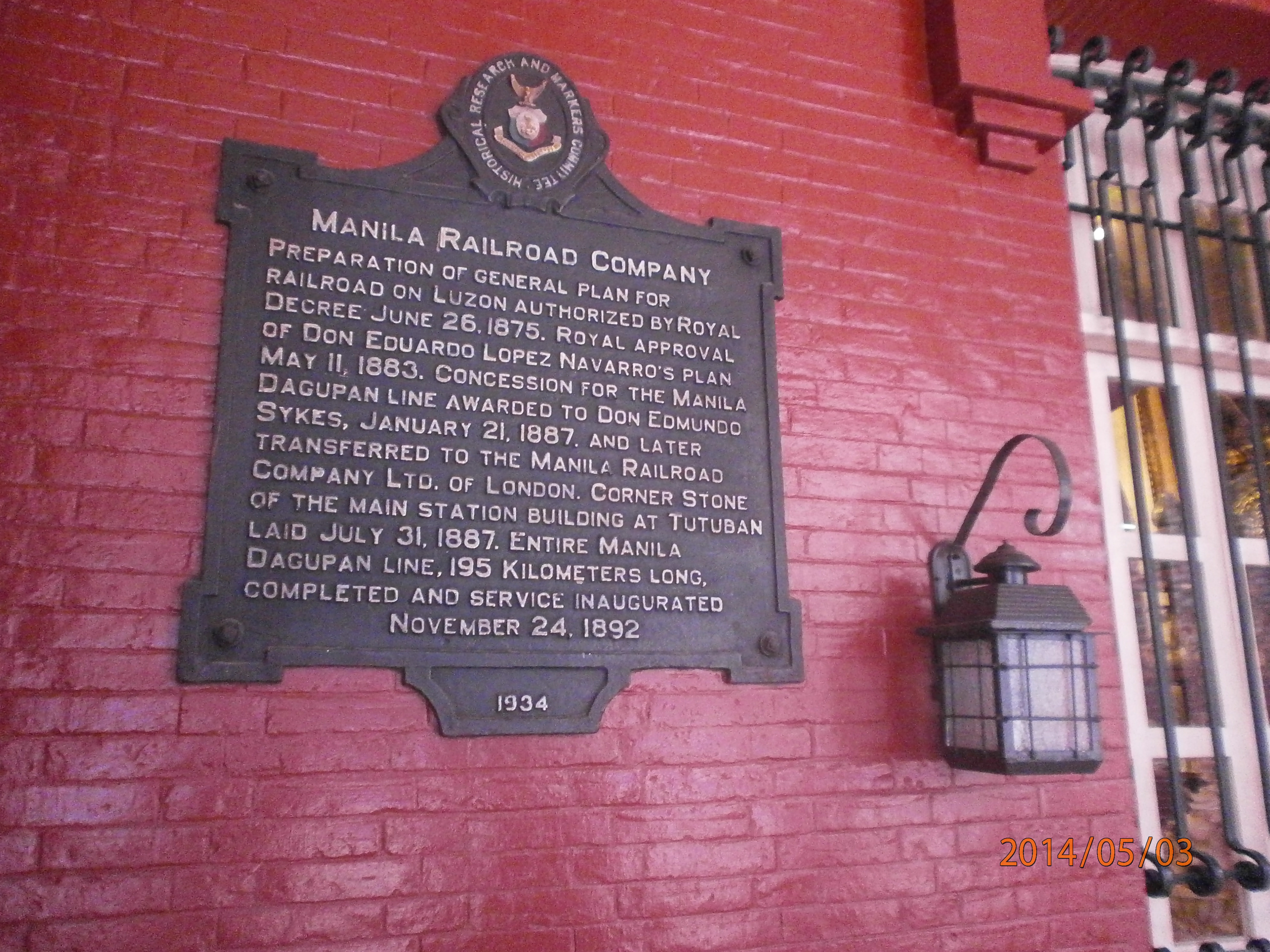
Historical marker of the Tutuban Center Main Building

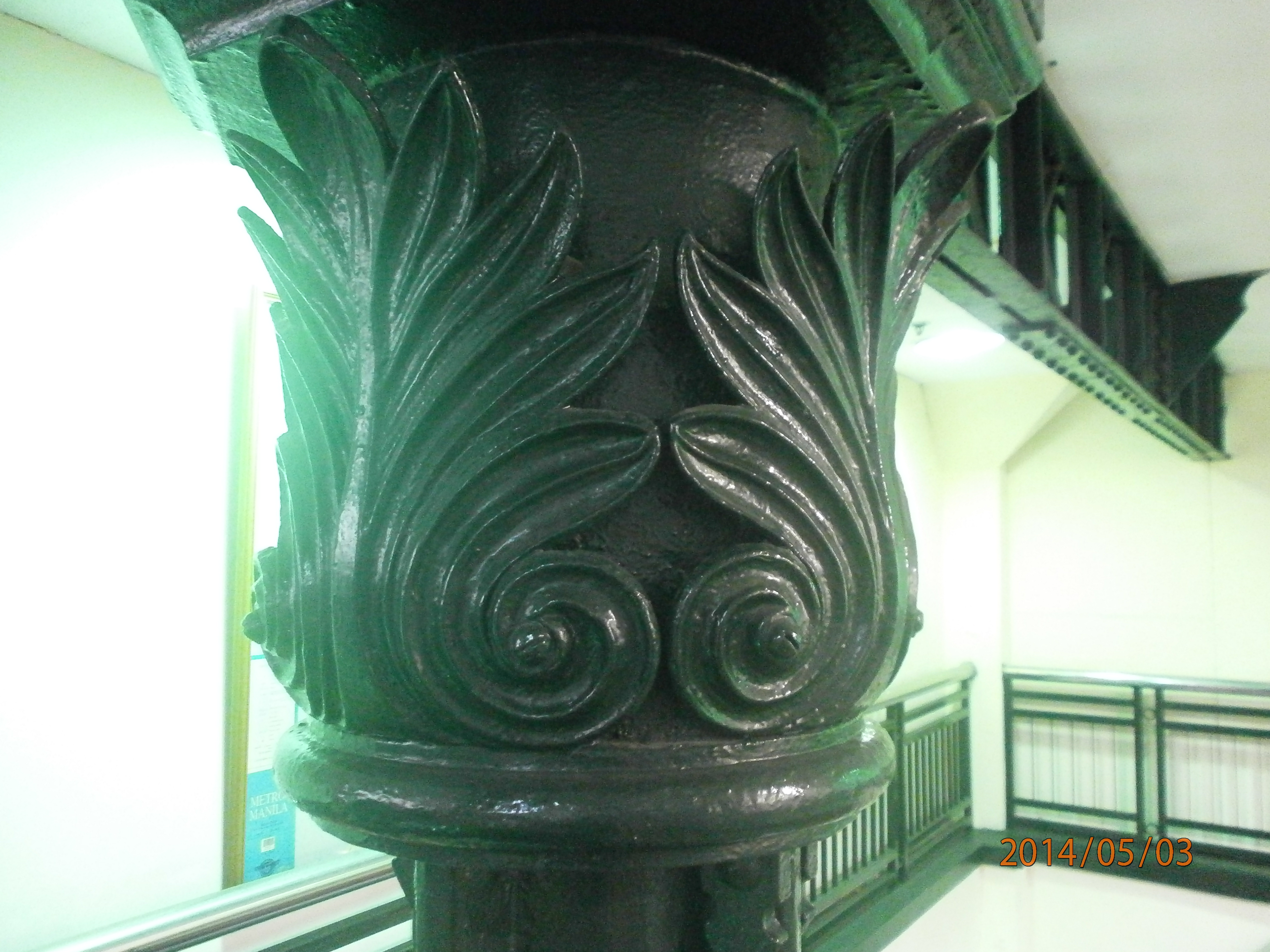
Iron Corinthian column at Tutuban Center Mall

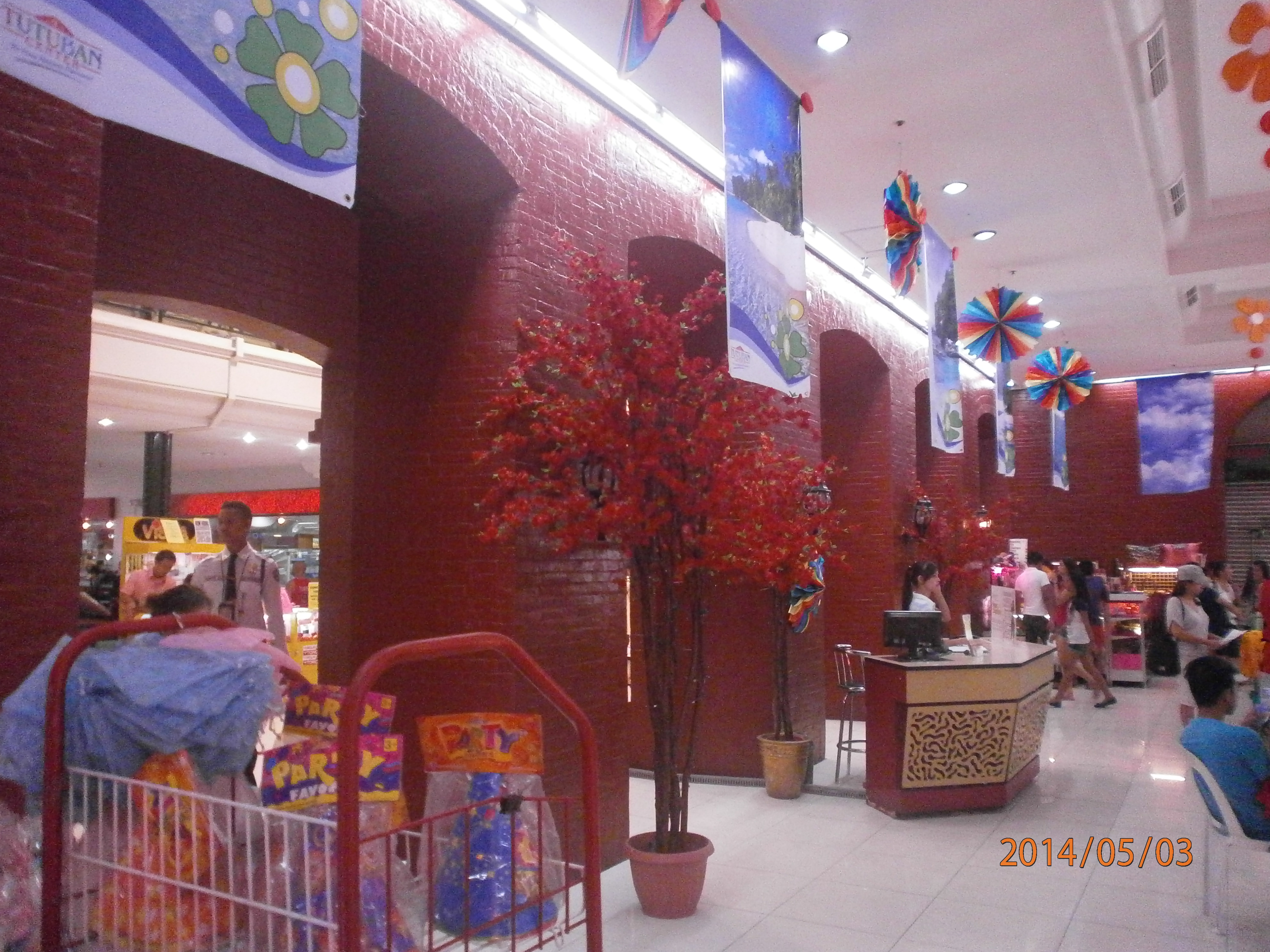
Restored lobby wall of the old Tutuban station

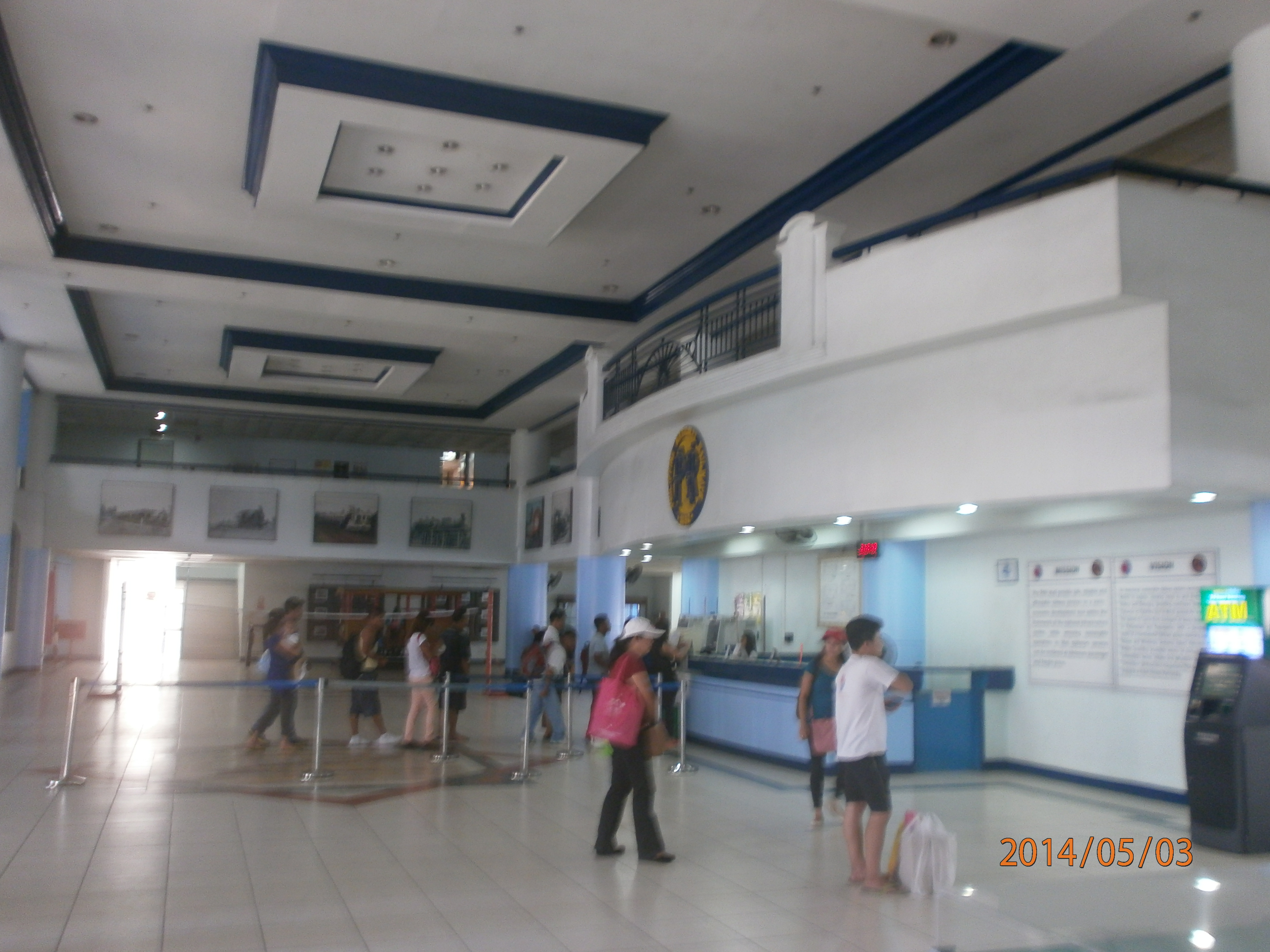
Lobby of the current Tutuban station

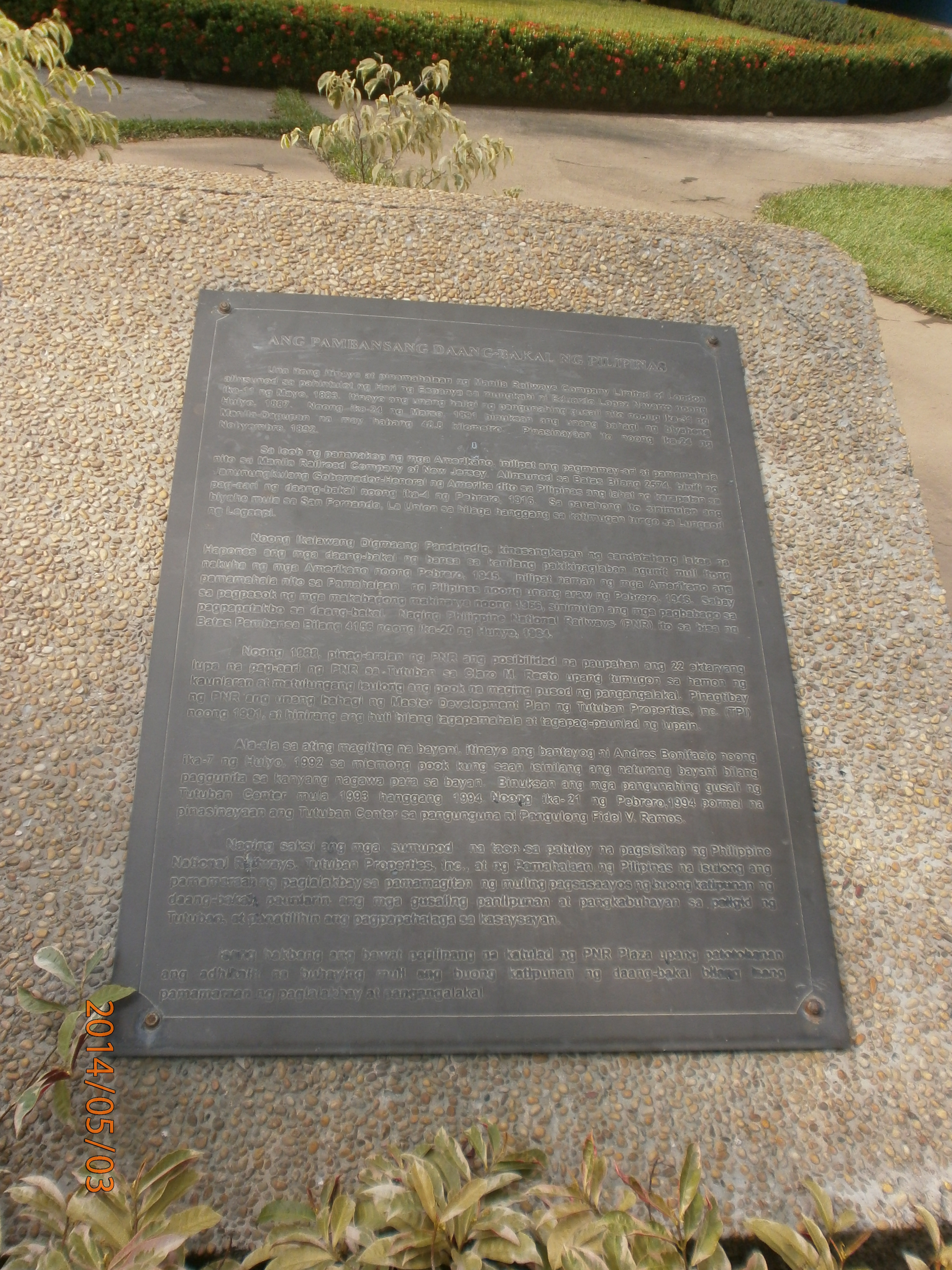
Historical marker at the new Tutuban station

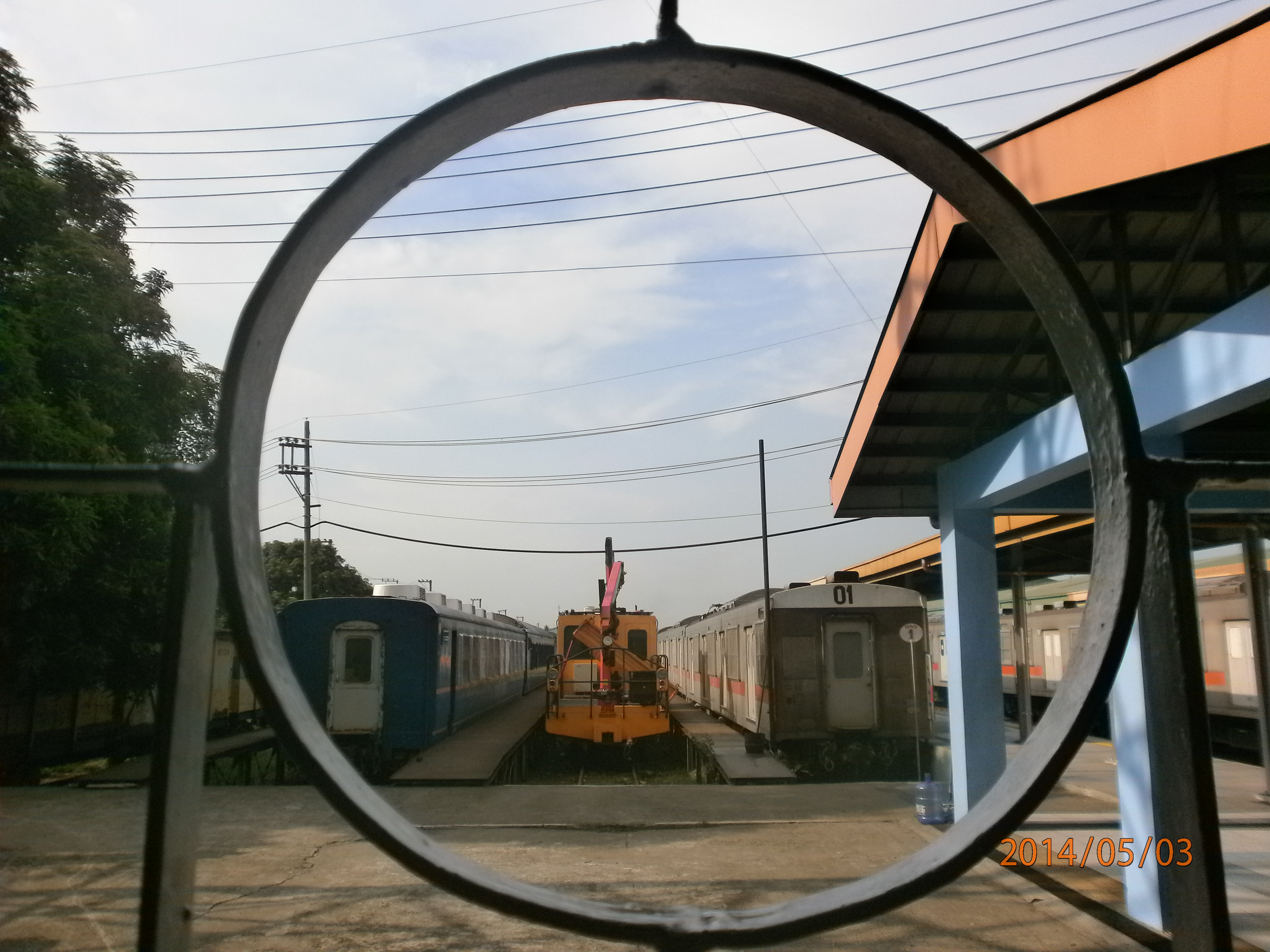
PNR depot in Tutuban

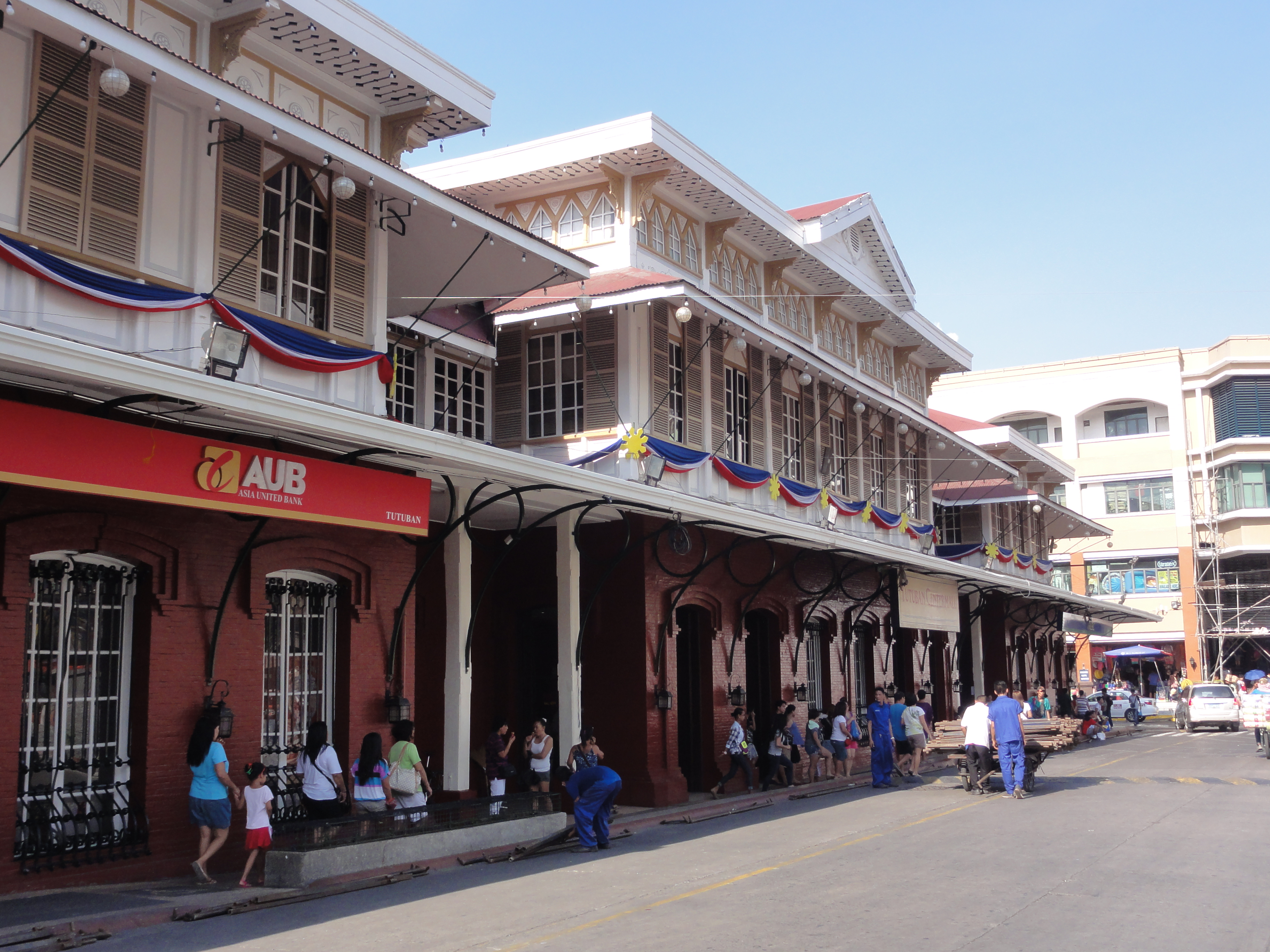
Façade of the old Tutuban station. Currently the Tutuban Center Mall

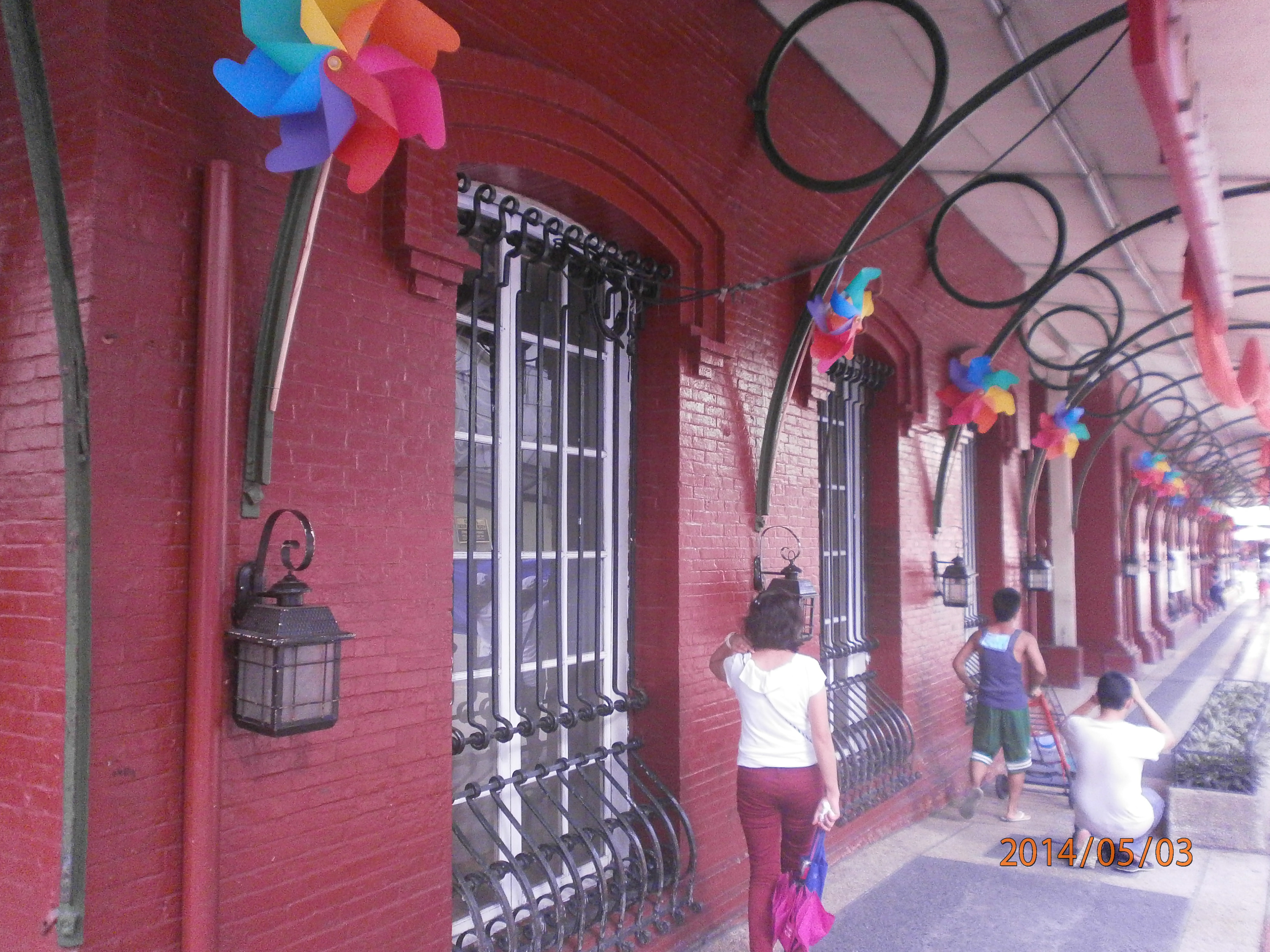
Tutuban Center Mall. Formerly the old Tutuban station façade

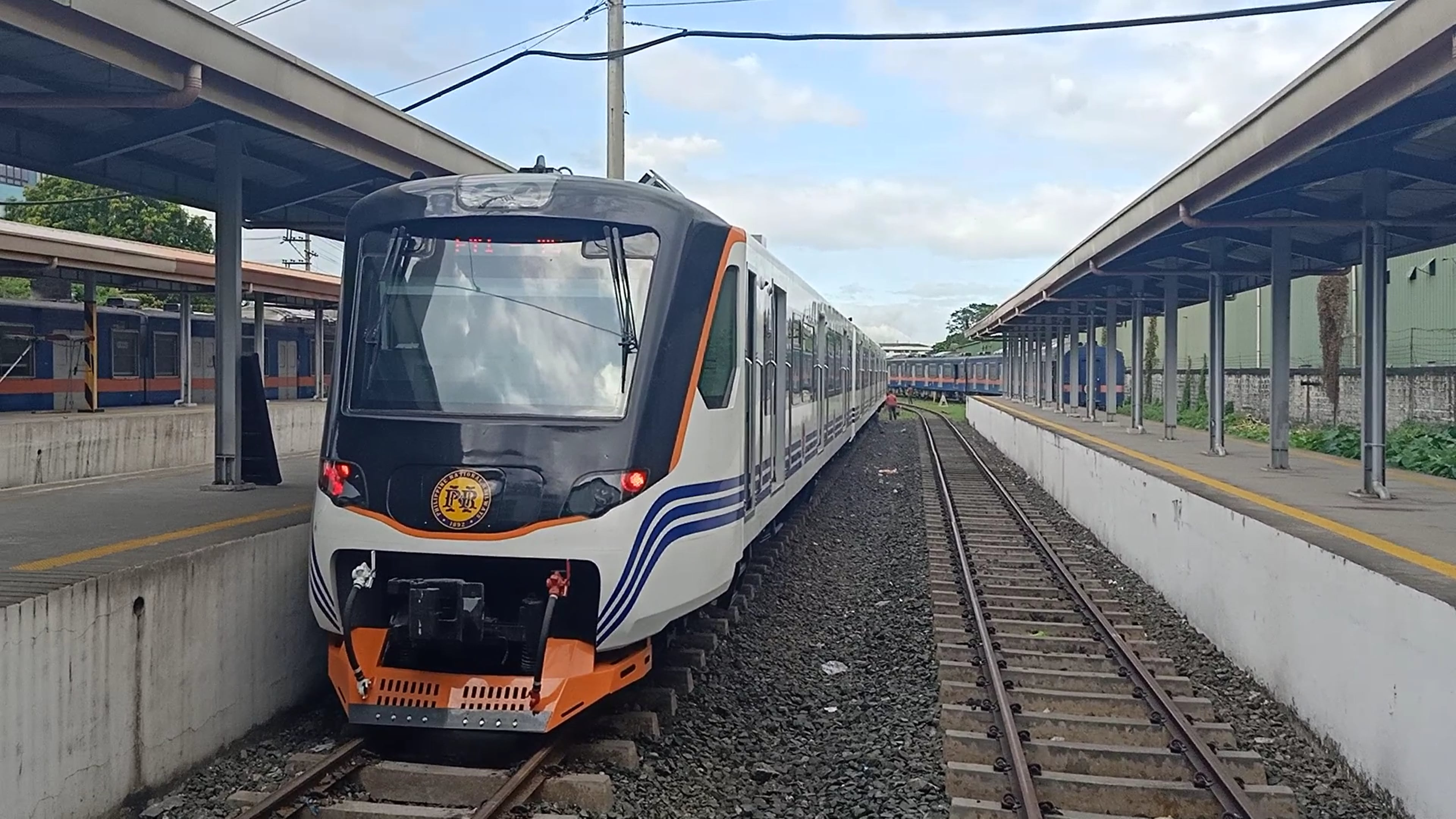
Tutuban station in December 2019, with an INKA 8000 class DMU parked in the platform

== See also ==
- Paco station
