= Sucat–Balintawak 230kV =

High-voltage overhead power line based in the Philippines

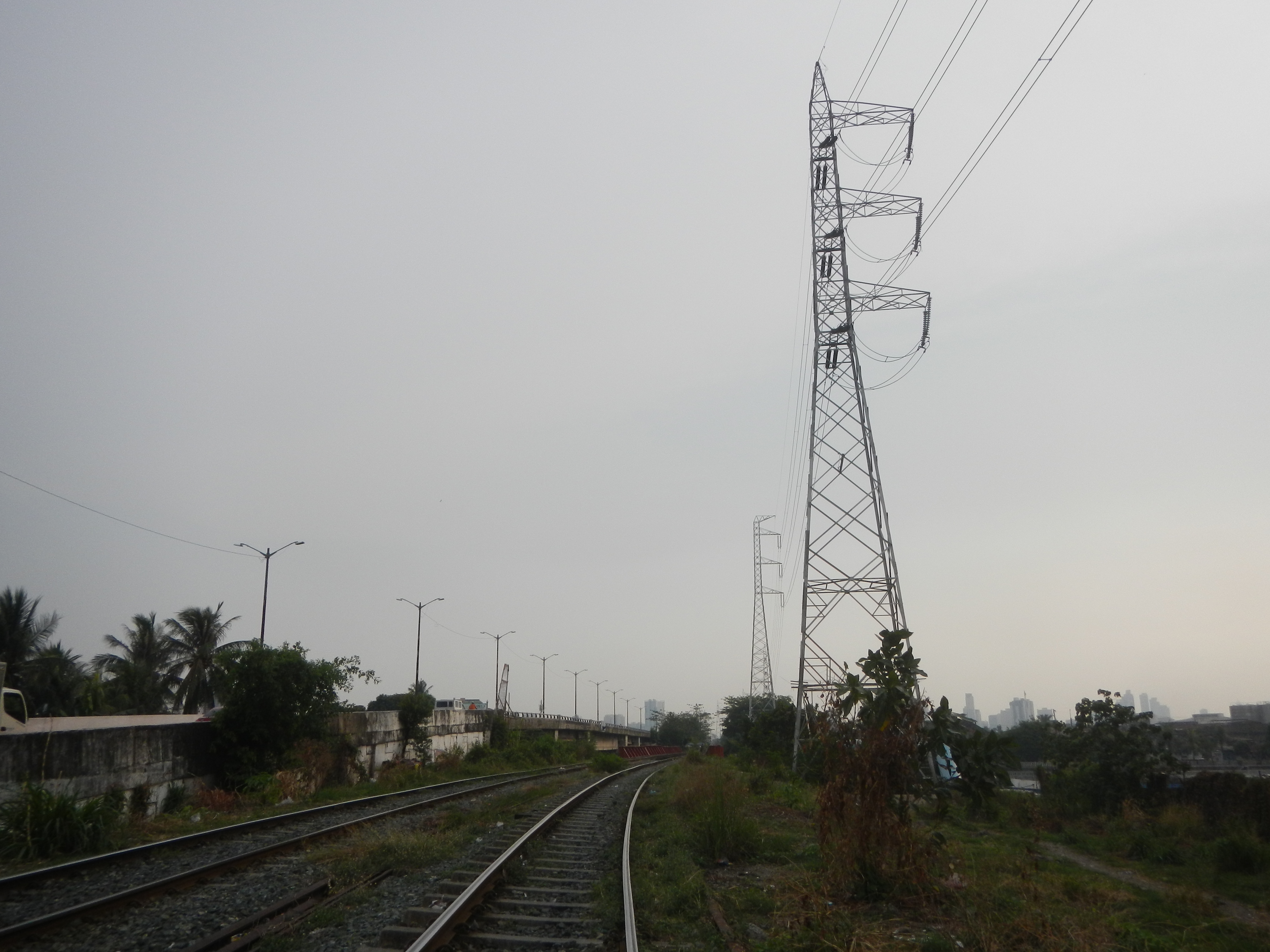
- A segment of the transmission line along Tomas Claudio Street/PNR in Pandacan, Manila, with the lattice tower 154 at the foreground.

Location
- Country: Philippines
- Province: Metro Manila
- Coordinates: 14°26′40″N 121°3′9″E; 14°34′50″N 120°59′54″E; 14°37′6″N 121°0′56″E; 14°39′38″N 121°0′44″E
- From: Sucat Substation
- Passes through: Araneta Substation; Pasig River; Meralco Paco Substation; Magallanes Interchange
- To: Balintawak Substation

Ownership information
- Owner: see Ownership, operations, and maintenance information
- Operator: see Ownership, operations, and maintenance information

Construction information
- Construction started: 1996; 30 years ago
- Commissioned: July 2000; 26 years ago

Technical information
- Type: Overhead transmission line
- Current type: HVAC
- Total length: 34 km (21 mi)
- No. of towers: 246 (219 steel poles, 26 lattice towers, and 1 portal tower)
- AC voltage: 230 kV
- No. of poles: 219
- No. of circuits: 1

The Sucat–Paco–Araneta–Balintawak Transmission Line (abbreviated as SA, (Note: Abbreviation used on the line's Sucat–Araneta segment.) 8LI1QUE-DIM, (Note: NGCP abbreviation of the line's Balintawak–Araneta segment. (Introduced by NGCP and putting stickers (the yellow and black one) along Balintawak-Araneta segment, example: [8LI1QUE-DIM] 123.)) 8LI1DIM-MNA, (Note: NGCP abbreviation of the line's Araneta–Paco segment.. (Introduced by NGCP and putting stickers (the yellow and black one) along Araneta-Paco segment, example: [8LI1DIM-MNA] 123.)) 8LI1MNA-MUN, (Note: NGCP abbreviation of the line's Paco–Sucat segment. (Introduced by NGCP and putting stickers (the yellow and black one) along Paco-Sucat segment, example: [8LI1MNA-MUN] 123.)) SPABTL) also known as Muntinlupa–Manila–Doña Imelda–Quezon Transmission Line, commonly known as Sucat–Balintawak 230kV and formerly known as Sucat–Araneta–Balintawak Transmission Line from July 2000 to October 2012, is a 230,000 volt, single-circuit, three-part transmission line in Metro Manila, Philippines that connects Sucat and Balintawak substations of National Grid Corporation of the Philippines (NGCP), with line segment termination at NGCP Araneta substation in Quezon City and Manila Electric Company (Meralco) Paco substation in Paco, Manila.

== History ==
The Sucat–Paco–Araneta–Balintawak Transmission Line began construction in 1996 and went into service in July 2000 which took four years to complete because there is a right of way (ROW) or alignment constraints. The line was constructed to increase the transmission output in the urban grid in Metro Manila to cover the increasing demand for electricity and a contribution was to be made to ensuring a continuous supply of electricity and to the macroeconomic objectives of growth and employment, and to address the Luzon power crisis from 1991 to 1993. It is one of the shortest transmission lines in the Philippines with its 34 kilometer span. The transmission line has four substations to connect but the ROW needs to be flexible which is the reason why the line uses the Skyway Stage 3 ROW. The electrical current heads south because the Hermosa–Duhat–Balintawak transmission line connects to Balintawak substation making the power line third of five lines forming the transmission network from Bataan Combined Cycle Power Plant (BCCPP) in Limay, Bataan to Calaca Power Plant in Calaca, Batangas and six to Mak–Ban Geothermal Power Plant in Santo Tomas also in Batangas and Bay in Laguna, and its frequency is 60.14 Hz (every transmission line in Philippines have 60 hertz). There are no loads measured but the information, was not publicly available.

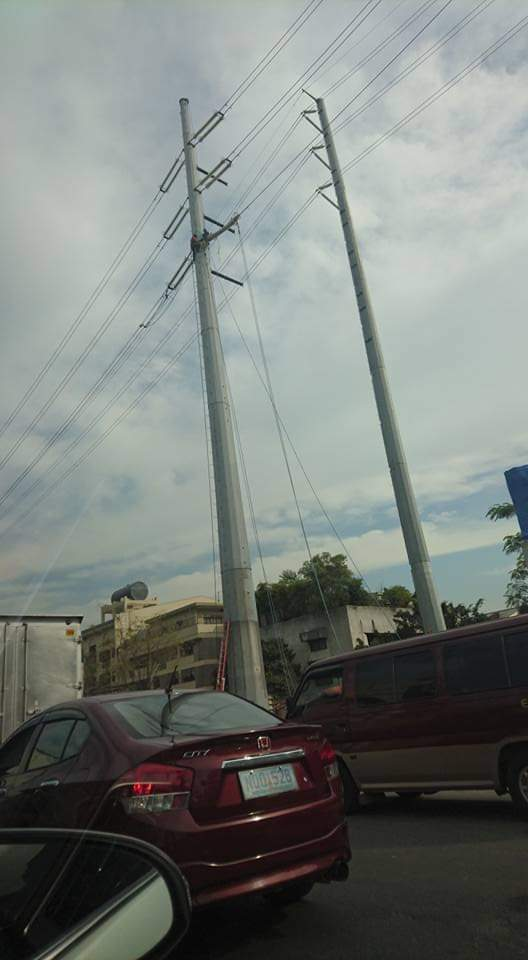
Relocation of the Sucat-Paco segment in 2017. The older line has ongoing stripping of conductors (one conductor cut from double bundle phase C) and removal of the old line. The newer line is taller (in this image) than the older line. The newer pole's height is equivalent to that of the 230,000-volt Dasmariñas-Las Piñas transmission line.

With the construction of the Skyway Stage 3, several steel poles are being replaced by newer ones specifically those along the Araneta segment and also added new poles on certain portions of the line. The newer steel poles were made of porcelain discs (15) and 3 horizontal pole-mounted porcelain insulator. Since the construction of Skyway Stage 3, the newer design is flag design with the deadend insulators (made of polymer/porcelain)

As of 2016, the base of the transmission line segment of Sucat–Paco, Paco–Araneta, and Araneta–Balintawak segment have a large and tall circular pile with the National Grid Corporation of the Philippines (NGCP) new reflective reference tag (Araneta–Balintawak) and NAPOCOR/NPC steel pole and lattice tower numbers with NGCP's reference tags since 2015 on the Sucat–Paco and Araneta–Balintawak segments.

== Route description ==
The Sucat–Paco–Araneta–Balintawak Transmission Line passes through the cities of Muntinlupa, Taguig, Makati, Manila, and Quezon City. The Sucat–Paco and Paco–Araneta segments are under NGCP's South Luzon Operations and Maintenance (SLOM) District 1 (South Western Tagalog) while the Araneta–Balintawak segment is under North Luzon Operations and Maintenance (NLOM) District 7 (National Capital Region).

=== Sucat–Paco ===
The transmission line starts at Sucat Substation where it parallels Manuel L. Quezon Avenue and Laguna Lake Highway before it turns left. It then passes to Diego Silang Village and parallels with Carlos P. Garcia Avenue. It goes to the left again, passing through Manila American Cemetery and Bonifacio Heights before paralleling to South Luzon Expressway (SLEx) from Maricaban Creek to Magallanes Interchange and Osmeña Highway from Magallanes Interchange to Quirino Avenue. At Magallanes Interchange, it crosses to Epifanio delos Santos Avenue (EDSA). It continues on a straight route and after crossing Gil Puyat Avenue are 7 new steel poles that were used for the relocation of the line due to the construction of Skyway Stage 3. It crosses to San Andres Bukid and Paco. Near Paco Substation, the two broader Meralco transmission steel poles and one belonging to Sucat–Paco–Araneta–Balintawak line itself anchoring it before entering Paco Substation. The cut-in connection to Meralco Paco substation is located in this district, where the line's Sucat–Paco section ends.

=== Paco–Araneta ===
The line parallels to Tomas Claudio Street (or Paco–Santa Mesa Road), PNR Metro Commuter railroad and Magsaysay Boulevard, turns left to Gregorio Araneta Avenue and run parallel with the said avenue and Skyway Stage 3, and the line's Paco–Araneta section ends at Araneta Substation.

=== Araneta–Balintawak ===
The line continues paralleling Araneta Avenue and Skyway Stage 3 until it passes to Valentin Ventura Street, Tuktukan Street, and Kaingin Road before it crosses to EDSA. It turns left and after a few meters is the transmission line's terminus which is Balintawak Substation.

== Technical description ==
=== Engineering ===
The chief engineer of the line were never fully disclosed. Based on the KfW report, the line had several right-of-way (ROW) acquisition delays during the land acquisition stage of the line. With the Skyway Stage 3 construction cost of ₱55.63 billion, it likely involves NGCP to reheight and relocation of poles alongside the alignment affecting the Stage 3's ROW (alongside G. Araneta Avenue and along near Osmeña Highway given the utility relocation for all affected Meralco and NGCP-owned poles have a total cost of ₱798.25 million.

=== Design ===
==== Original design ====
The original design almost uses the "flag" design poles except one in Araneta substation, which uses irregular wishbone-based design. It uses Hermosa–Balintawak 230 kV design as a reference though there are variations: the post insulators of every anchor poles are not adjacent (located few centimeters down from the strain insulators) and the suspension poles have now a pole Harm at the disc side rather than thick rod used in HB 230 kV. This design still being used to this day though they were relocated and as a legacy to that National Power Corporation (NAPOCOR/NPC)-era design framework. Most of the insulator mounting systems was a direct mount with preformed brackets at steel pole segments (whose pole ends segment system was friction-based attachments and are tapered).

==== Skyway Stage 3 poles ====
Prior to the Skyway Stage 3 construction and utility relocation, the then new National Grid Corporation of the Philippines (NGCP)-era poles are all of "flag" design, featuring the four-armed (4) anchor poles and NGCP-era direct mount anchor poles (same as the original design but the spacing is more compact yet tall). However, the legacy design was still used, each of them had legacy hardware that was formerly used by the NPC though the pole end segment attachment system was bolted.

=== Hardware ===
==== Suspension insulators ====
The NAPOCOR/NPC-era suspension insulators features a V-shaped horizontal assemblies (commonly known as braced line posts). The 230 kV rated suspension discs acts as a lateral support that resists from the vertical resultant forces (V_{f}) and a 230 kV rated post insulator acts an strut that resists from the horizontal resultant forces (H_{f}). Just like with the original design, the attachment point for the insulator string was a preformed bracket in order to avoid a joint snap under live load (the conductors themselves). The base of the insulator design was Hermosa–Balintawak 230 kV and other predecessor 230 kV power lines. While NGCP-era poles had now I-string insulators in the four-armed design, the latter serves as a legacy from the NAPOCOR/NPC design framework. Most material used for all insulators are porcelain/ceramic but there are few polymer variants.

==== Strain and post insulators ====
===== Dead-end/strain insulators =====
Same as other 230 kV lines, though the clamps were now conductor tie-in clamps or gun-shaped clamps.

===== Post insulators =====
With the dead-end/anchor pole design, the placement of the post insulator is few centimeters down from the dead-end or strain insulators. The material is porcelain, in par of the insulator material used.

All of the insulator strings and braced line post insulator assemblies feature corona rings.

=== Inventory ===
The transmission line consists of 219 steel poles (53 on the Balintawak–Araneta segment (1–53) and 167 on the Araneta–Paco and Paco–Sucat segments (1–8, 30-149, 150A, 150B, and 155–185)), 26 lattice towers (9-29, 150, and 151–154), and 1 portal tower located between steel poles 49 and 50 ((8LI1MNA-MUN)97) totaling to 246 transmission structures. Steel poles have flag tower design (suspension and anchor variants), while lattice towers have incomplete tower design. Portal towers are used on portions of the line where it intersects with another power line. It has a length of 34 kilometers (21 mi) and is a single-circuit, double-bundle power line.

=== Elevation ===
The highest elevation segment are the Paco–Araneta and Araneta–Balintawak segments, utilizing the Skyway Stage 3 and steel poles are 60-70m tall.

=== Storage space for structures retired from original use and ownership ===
The National Power Corporation (NAPOCOR/NPC)-era transmission structures that were retired from original use and ownership because of various projects made by National Grid Corporation of the Philippines (NGCP) on the line were stored on various substations for those unused for a while. Most people know that the unused retired structures are stored in a structure's graveyard but it is not. They are stored in various substations for future other uses with their new ownership.

Electrical Information of Sucat–Paco–Araneta–Balintawak Transmission Line
Segment	Current	Volts	Heading
Sucat–Paco	not measured	230,000	South
Paco–Araneta	not measured	230,000	South
Araneta–Balintawak	not measured	230,000	South
Relocated and added steel poles segments due to construction of Skyway Stage 3 and NLEX Connector	not measured	230,000	South

Bundle information
Bundle type and segment	Spacers	Amps	Broken spacers
Sucat–Paco–Araneta–Balintawak (other segments)	500 +	not measured	0
Relocated and added steel poles segments due to construction of Skyway Stage 3 and NLEX Connector)	300 +	not measured	0

Components and length
Segment	Number of structures	Length
Araneta–Balintawak	53 steel poles	5.67 km
Paco–Araneta	44 (39 steel poles, 5 lattice towers)	5.92 km
Sucat–Paco	149 (128 steel poles, 21 lattice towers)	22.24 km

Structure/tower information
Type of steel pole or lattice tower	Height	Weight	Insulator
Suspension steel pole (flag)	30-70m tall	—	3 braced line post insulators made of 17 porcelain discs facing in one direction and forming the pole a flag shape, and a steel crossarm used to support the overhead ground wire (OHGW) at the steel pole's top segment. Some newer suspension steel poles can have polymer composite dead-end insulator.
Anchor steel pole (flag and irregular)	30-70m tall	—	Horizontal dead-end insulators made of 17-22 porcelain discs with 3 horizontal pole-mounted porcelain insulator at the center. When viewed sidewards for the flag variant of the anchor steel pole, the horizontal pole-mounted porcelain insulators resemble the letter "E" while its front side looks like a three-leveled lowercase letter "T" or a cross. Some newer anchor steel poles can have polymer composite dead-end insulator. Irregular variant has 3 horizontal dead-end insulators on a steel crossarm and another 3 arranged in a vertical pattern, has vertical insulator mounted on one side of a crossarm, at the center are 1-2 insulators, and on the pole's top segment is another steel crossarm used to support the overhead ground wire (OHGW) where it is used near the Balintawak and Araneta substations. Newer anchor poles with flag design have 3 horizontal made of 22 porcelain discs and vertical insulators with 21 discs mounted on steel crossarms, with a crossarm at the top segment to support the OHGW.
Suspension lattice towers	70m	—	3 double-bundle vertical suspension insulators consisting of 34 porcelain discs.
Anchor lattice towers	70m	—	3 dead-end horizontal insulators made with 15 porcelain discs and 6 vertical porcelain insulator.
Portal towers	10m	—	Same as anchor lattice towers.

== Ownership, operations, and maintenance information ==
The transmission line was originally operated, maintained, and owned by the government-owned National Power Corporation (NAPOCOR/NPC) from July 2000 to March 1, 2003. Operations, maintenance, and ownership of the line then transferred to another government corporation National Transmission Corporation (TransCo) on March 1, 2003 where it operated and maintained the line until January 15, 2009. The line's operations and maintenance was transferred to privately owned National Grid Corporation of the Philippines (NGCP) on January 15, 2009 where it now operates and maintains the power line since then.

As a result of the turnover from TransCo to NGCP, and Republic Act (RA) 9511 and concession agreement between both parties which authorized the latter to exercise the right of eminent domain necessary for the construction, expansion, and efficient maintenance and operation of the transmission system and grid and the efficient operation and maintenance of the subtransmission systems which have not yet been disposed by TransCo where NGCP acts as the temporary owner of these assets and facilities and they will be transferred to TransCo once the 50-year NGCP concession period ends on December 1, 2058, lands where the transmission structures stand and their pedestals or foundations and right-of-way or portions of a power line acquired and designated, and facilities built or placed from January 15, 2009 (new steel poles built due to the construction of Skyway Stage 3) are operated, maintained, and owned by NGCP, while those that were placed or built, acquired, and designated from July 2000 to January 14, 2009 are owned by TransCo and operated and maintained by NGCP, as one mandate of the former is to handle all existing cases, including right-of-way and claims which accrued prior to the transfer of power grid operations and maintenance to the latter on January 15, 2009. Below is the table showing the ownership information on each lands where the structures and their respective foundations and pedestals stand, and right-of-way.

Ownership Information of Sucat–Paco–Araneta–Balintawak Transmission Line
Owner	Number of lands and structures owned	Number of right-of-way or portions owned	Length	Percentage (by number of lands and structures)	Percentage (by number of right-of-way or portions)	Percentage (by length)
National Transmission Corporation (TransCo)	196 (169 steel poles, 26 lattice towers, 1 portal tower)	10	28.29 km	79.67%	55.56%	83.21%
National Grid Corporation of the Philippines (NGCP; owned, operated, and maintained)	50 steel poles	8	5.94 km	20.33%	44.44%	17.47%

== Health controversy ==
The SLEx (Makati) – Bonifacio Heights (Taguig) segment of Sucat–Paco–Araneta–Balintawak Transmission Line was criticized by the residents living along the Tamarind Road in Dasmariñas Village, Makati, who claimed the transmission line pose health risks. The said segment is located within 10 meters (33 ft) of Tamarind Road in the said village. The residents, led by Atty. Eduardo F. Hernandez, blamed the electromagnetic fields (EMF) emanated by the 230-kV power lines for such health issues as cancer, leukemia, and miscarriage. They also took note of no consultation with regards to the construction of the transmission line.

A case was filed in Makati Regional and Metropolitan Trial Court (Makati RTC) in 2000, but was raised to the Supreme Court after failed negotiations. Responding to the petition filed by the residents, the Supreme Court ruled in 2006 that the safety issue of the lines was "evidentiary in nature," although they took note of the potential health risks due to EMF radiation exposure with regards to the scientific studies. The Court also added that long-term human safety should be of paramount importance as opposed to the presumption of economic benefits. Citing the said ruling, the Makati RTC in October 2008 obliged the National Transmission Corporation (TransCo) to "de-energize" the Sucat–Paco–Araneta–Balintawak Transmission Line.

TransCo vice president for operations Carlito Claudio warned in November 2008 that complete retirement of the transmission line could trigger "hours-long rotating blackouts, just like during the power crisis in the 1990s," that might adversely impact the country's leading economic hubs of Makati and Ortigas, and added the unfeasibility of building an alternate underground cable line that would cost ₱1 billion. Former TransCo president Alan Ortiz noted the transmission line as a crucial line, and said claims of electromagnetic radiation associated with high-voltage transmission lines like this "have yet to be 100-percent scientifically established." TransCo submitted a motion to the Supreme Court asking that they be granted until January 31, 2009 to carry out activities and coordination works in alleviating the impact of the impending shutdown, but was refused and instead supported the Makati RTC's decision in shutting the transmission line down.

The transmission towers stand on National Power Corporation (NAPOCOR/NPC) and National Transmission Corporation (TransCo) rights-of-way need to be re-heighted to address a controversy since 2008.

In its February 5, 2013 order, the Makati RTC approved the request of the petitioners, referring the case back to another branch following the failure of the judicial dispute resolution. The case is still pending at its pre-trial stage.

== Gallery ==
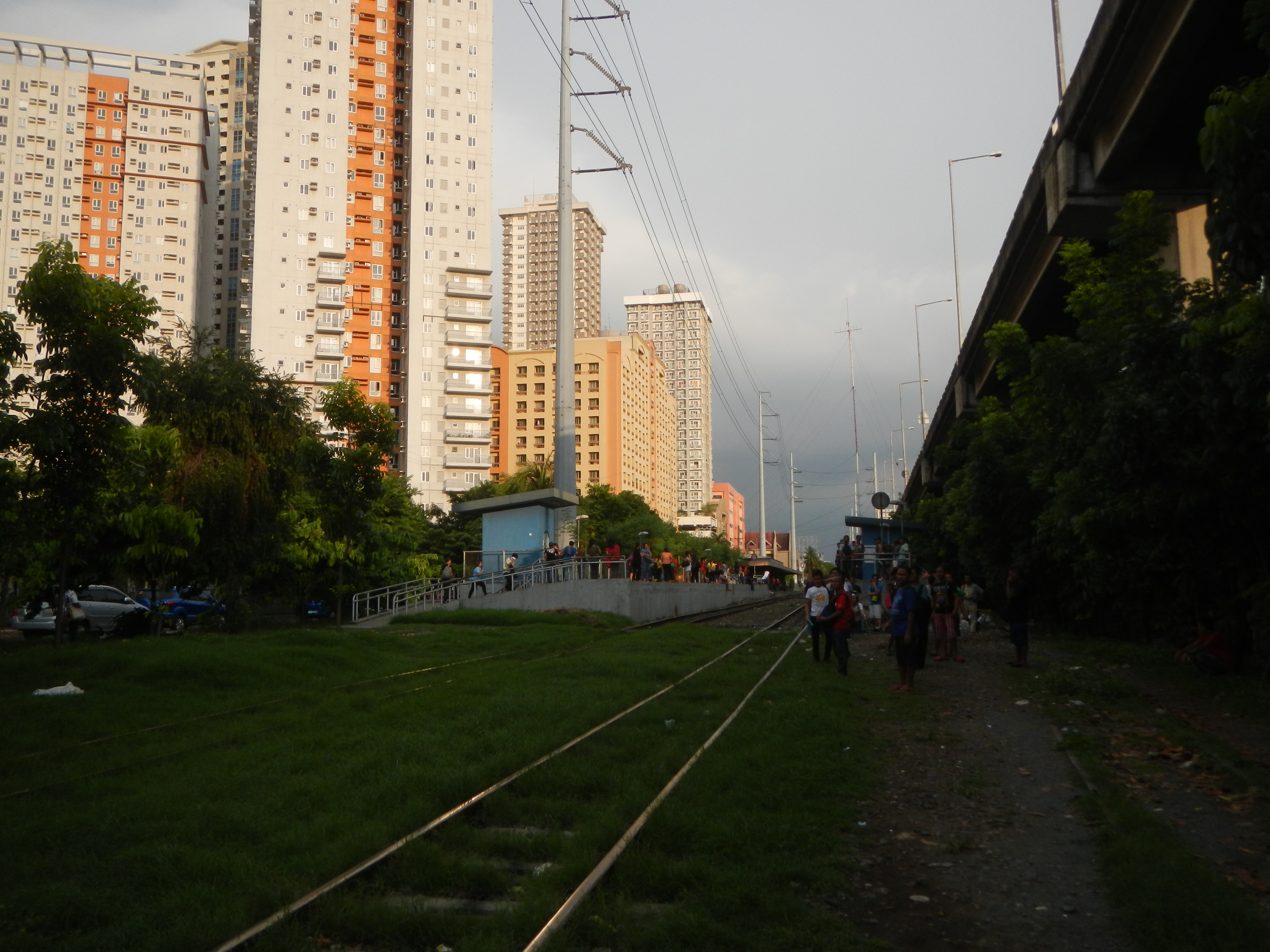
The transmission line near Arnaiz Avenue in Makati

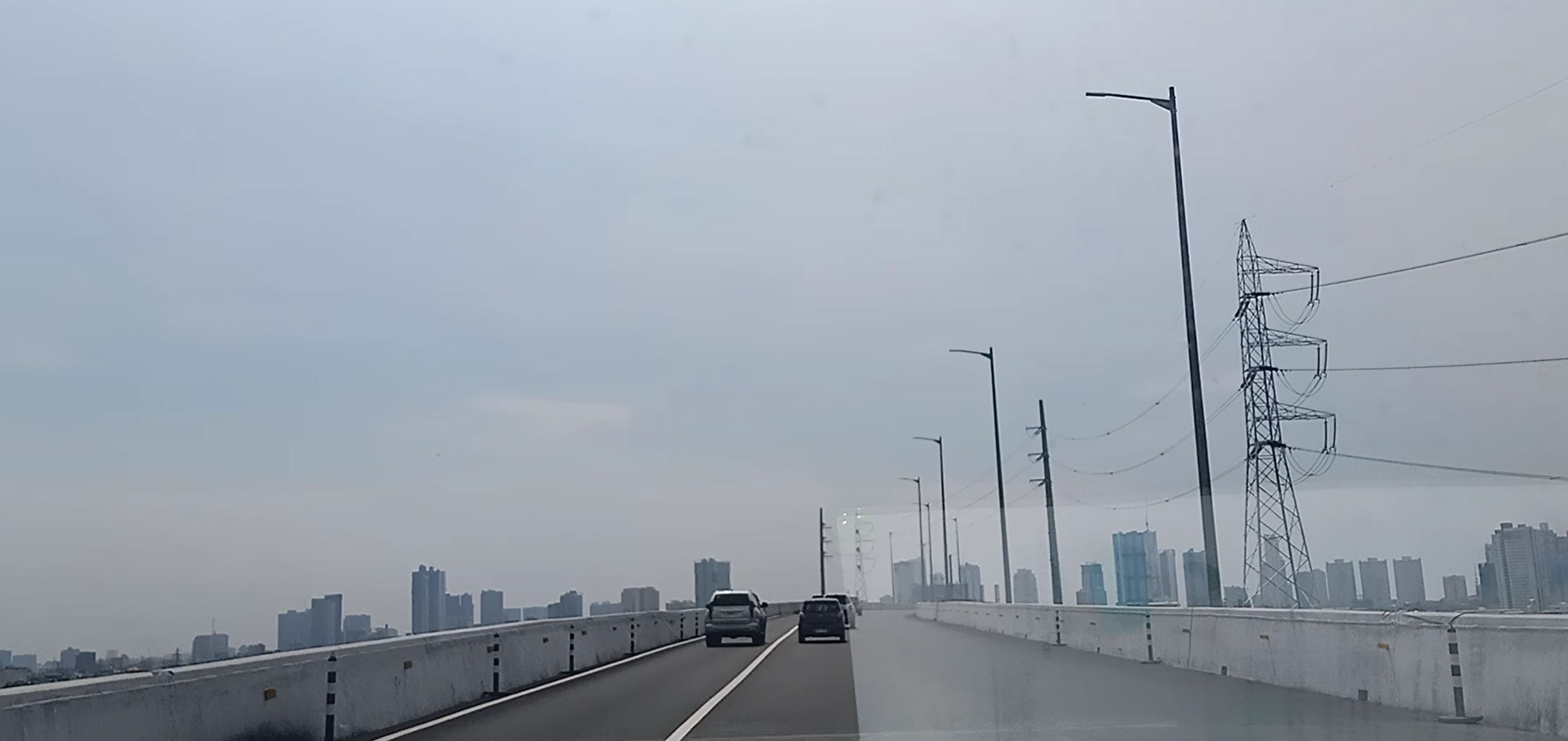
Lattice towers 150 and 151, and new steel poles 150A and 150B (of anchor or flag design) along the Tomas Claudio Street/Skyway Stage 3 segment

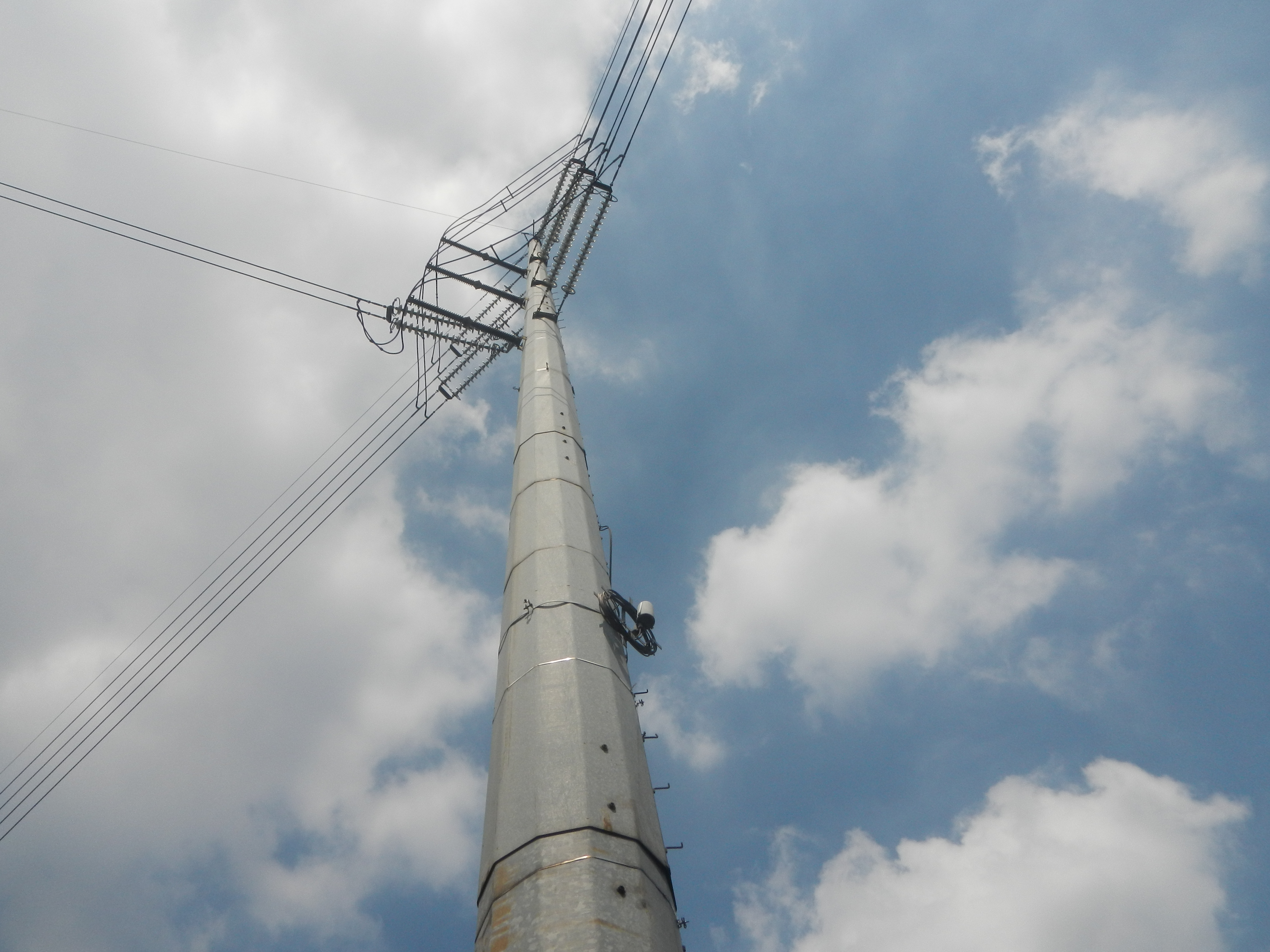
Steel pole 163 located along Magsaysay Boulevard, Manila. Note that the lowest insulator on the left in which it connects to a support steel pole instead of directly connecting to pole 162 like the rest of its insulators.

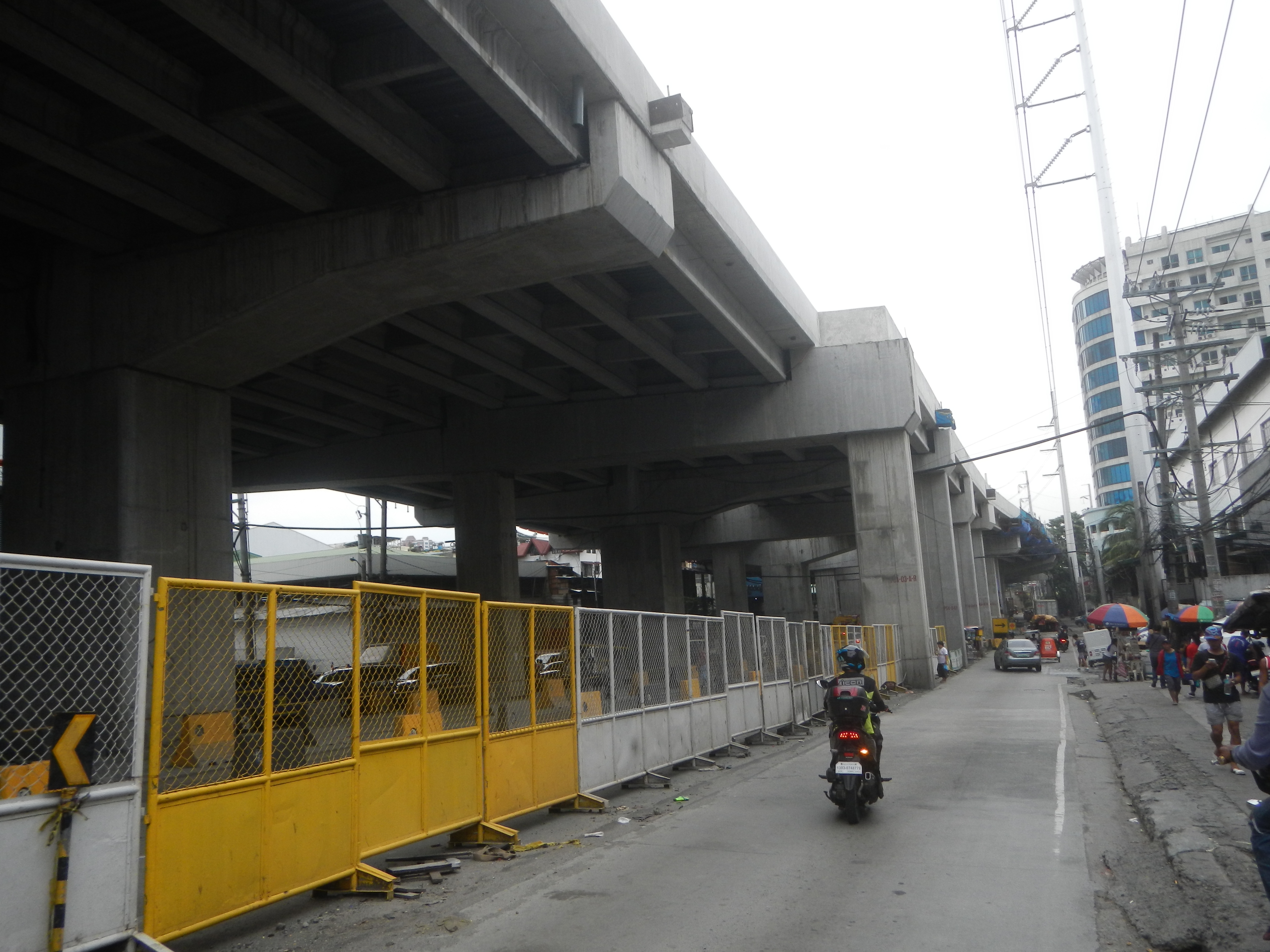
Steel pole 13 (of suspension or flag design, in the foreground) and 14 (of anchor or flag design, in the background) of the transmission line along the east side of the Gregorio Araneta Avenue

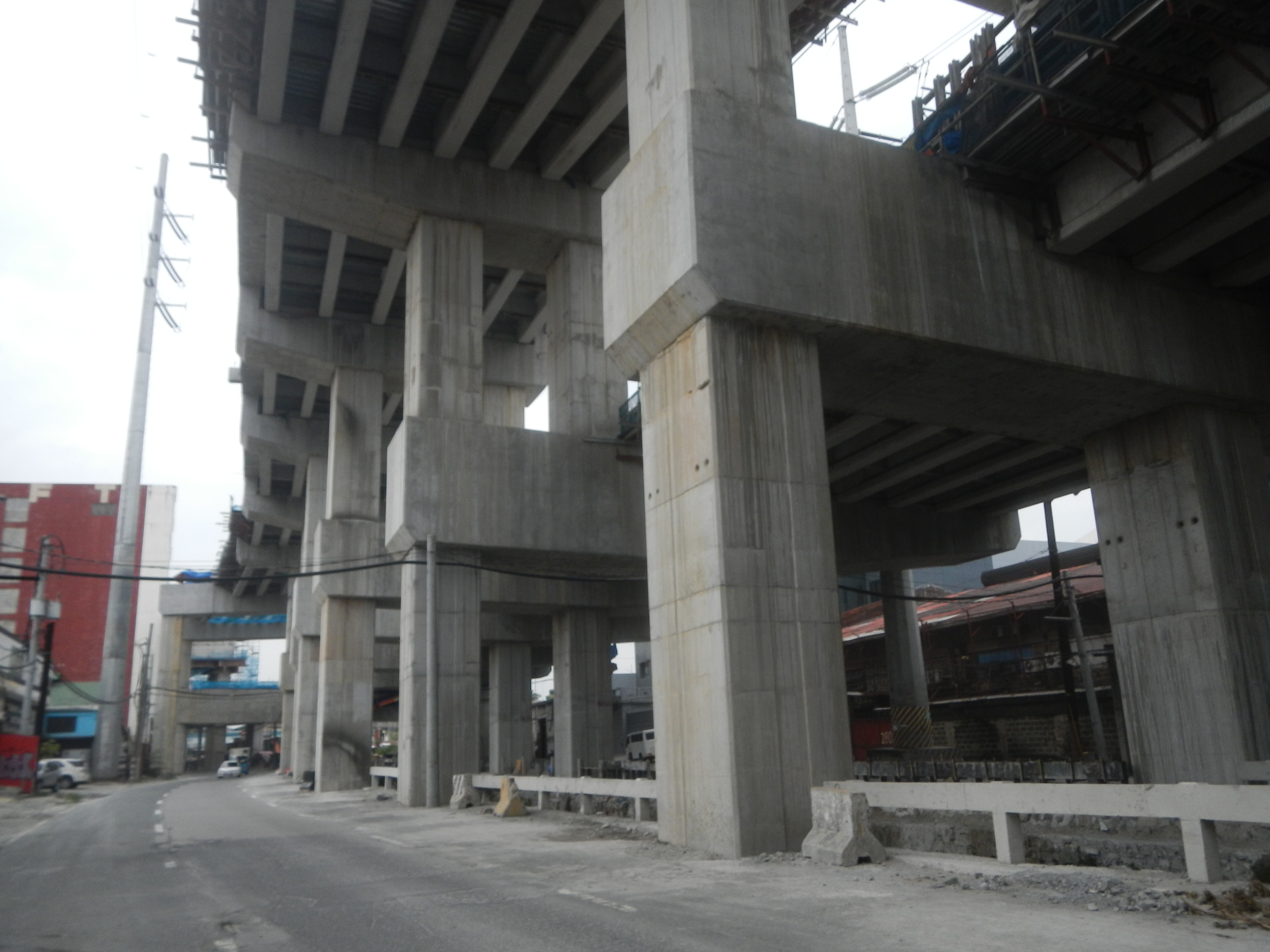
Replacement pole for the pole 28 along the west side of the Gregorio Araneta Avenue

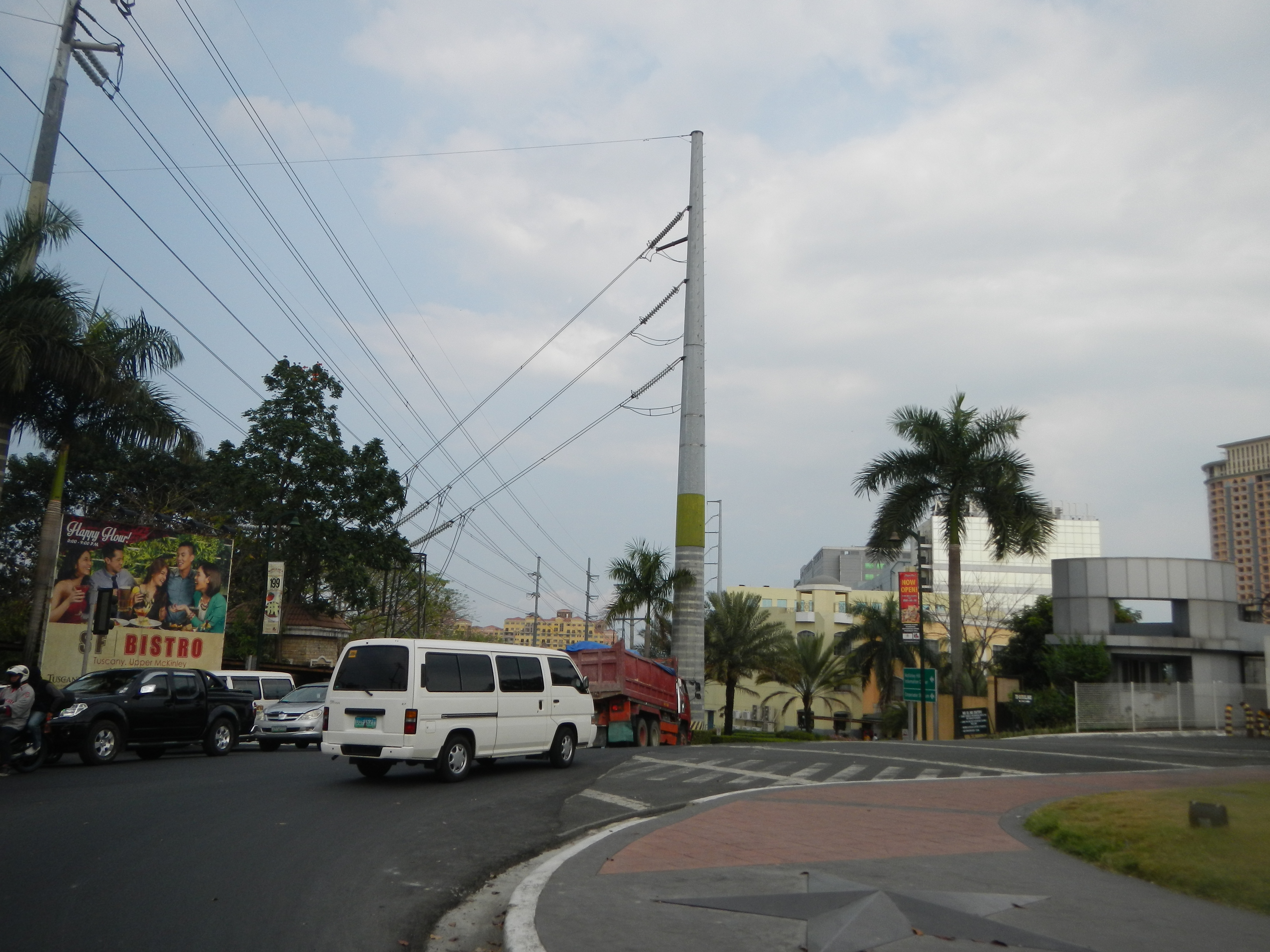
Steel pole 49 anchoring the line to a portal tower, located along Upper McKinley Road, Bonifacio Global City, Taguig.

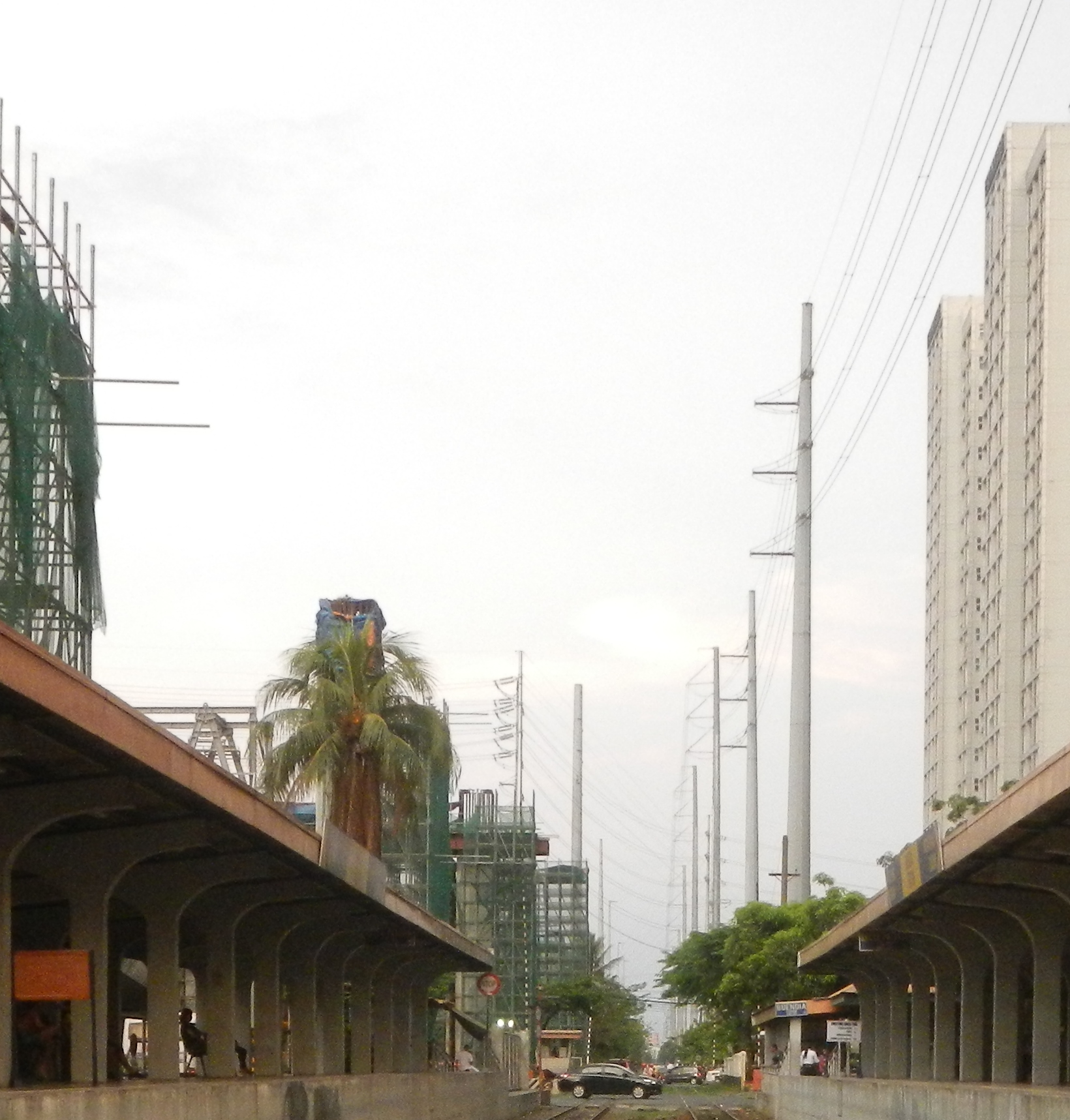
Poles 118 (foreground) and 119 (behind it) of the transmission line, with anchor designs, beside PNR and SLEx. Also seen is pole 120, having replaced an older structure to give way to the Skyway Stage 3 project.

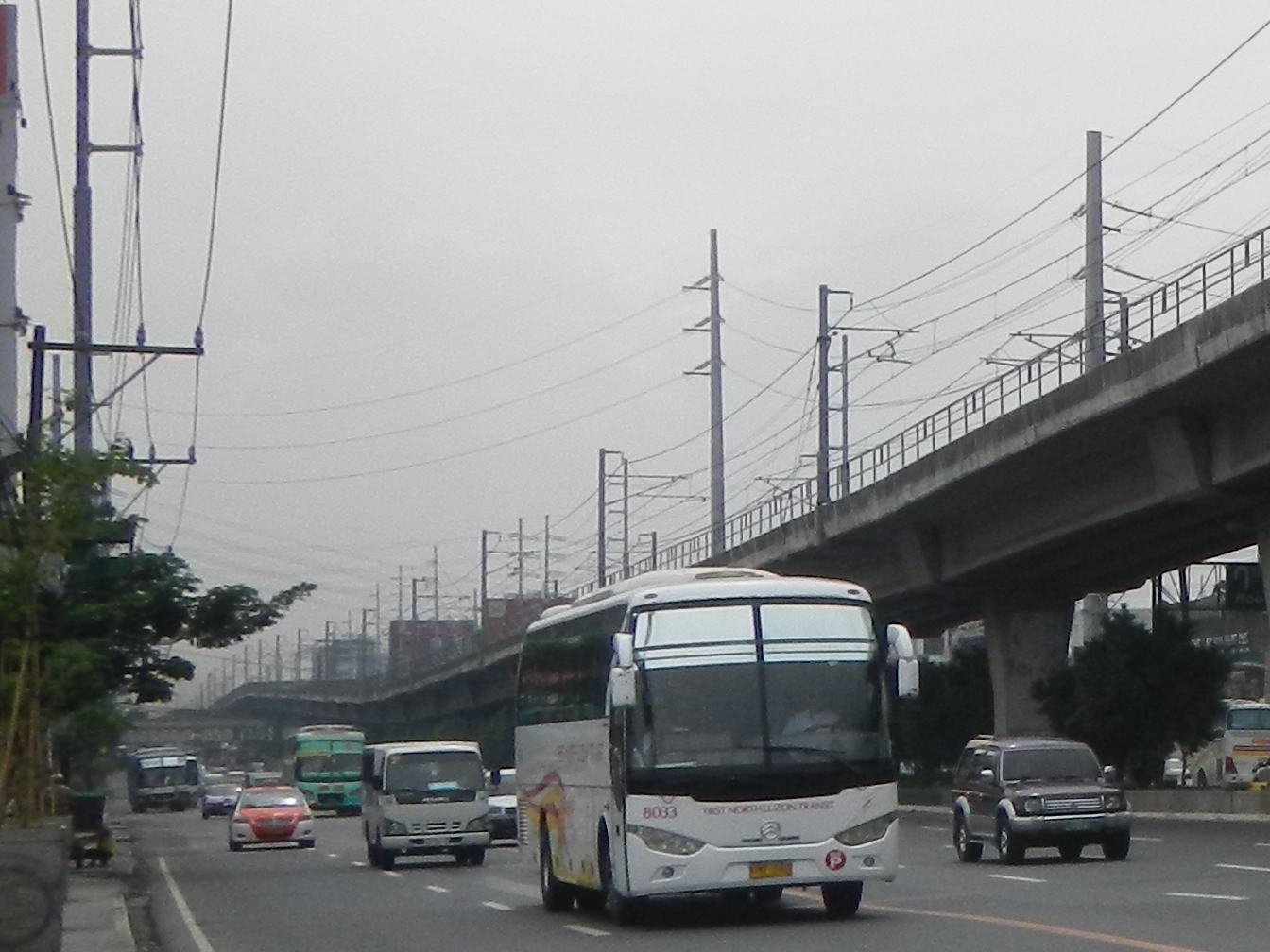
The transmission line along EDSA–Roosevelt area

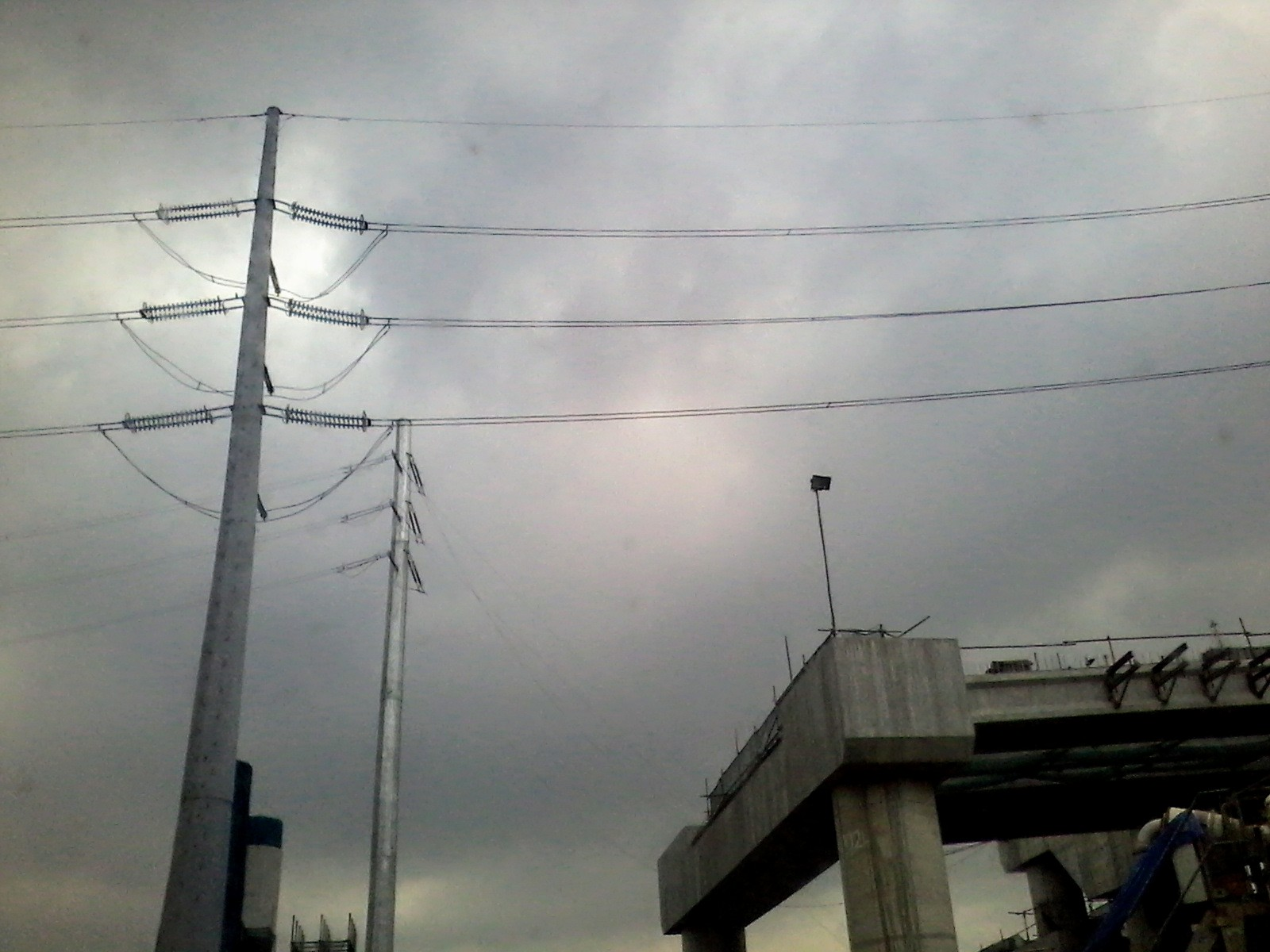
Rerouting of the transmission line segment along Quirino Avenue in Paco, using new steel pole 144, as a result of the construction of Skyway Stage 3.
