= Vito Cruz station =

Vito Cruz station can refer to two rail stations in the Manila metropolitan area:

- Vito Cruz station (LRT), a station on the Manila Light Rail Transit
- Vito Cruz station (PNR), a station on the Philippine National Railway
