= Pablo Ocampo Street =

Street in Metro Manila, Philippines

Coordinates: 14°33′47″N 120°59′46″E

- Ocampo Street; Vito Cruz Street
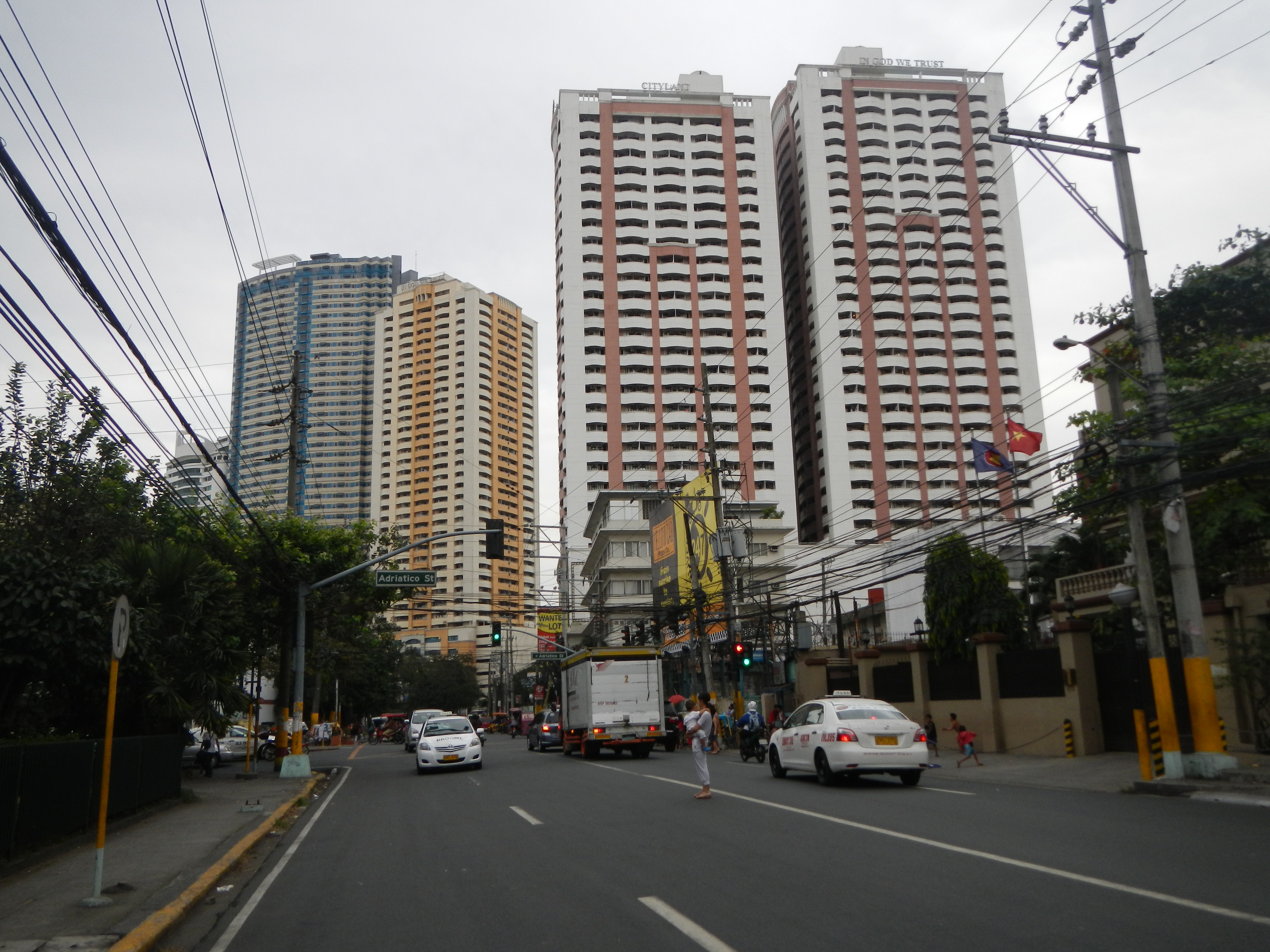
- The street in Malate, Manila
- Interactive map of Pablo Ocampo Street
- Former name: Vito Cruz Street
- Namesake: Pablo Ocampo; Hermógenes Vito-Cruz (formerly)
- Maintained by: Department of Public Works and Highways
- Length: 3.448 km (2.142 mi) includes extension in Makati
- West end: AH 26 (N120) (Roxas Boulevard) in Malate, Manila
- Major junctions: N170 (Taft Avenue); N145 (Osmeña Highway)
- East end: South Avenue in Makati

Pablo Ocampo Street, also known simply as Ocampo Street and formerly and still referred to as Vito Cruz Street, is an inner-city main road in Manila, Philippines. It runs west–east for about 3.448 kilometers (2.142 mi), connecting the southern districts of Malate and San Andres southeast to the adjacent city of Makati.

== Etymology ==
Since 1989, the street has been named in honor of the Filipino statesman and lawyer Pablo Ocampo, who served as a resident commissioner of the Philippines, assemblyman, and vice mayor of Manila.

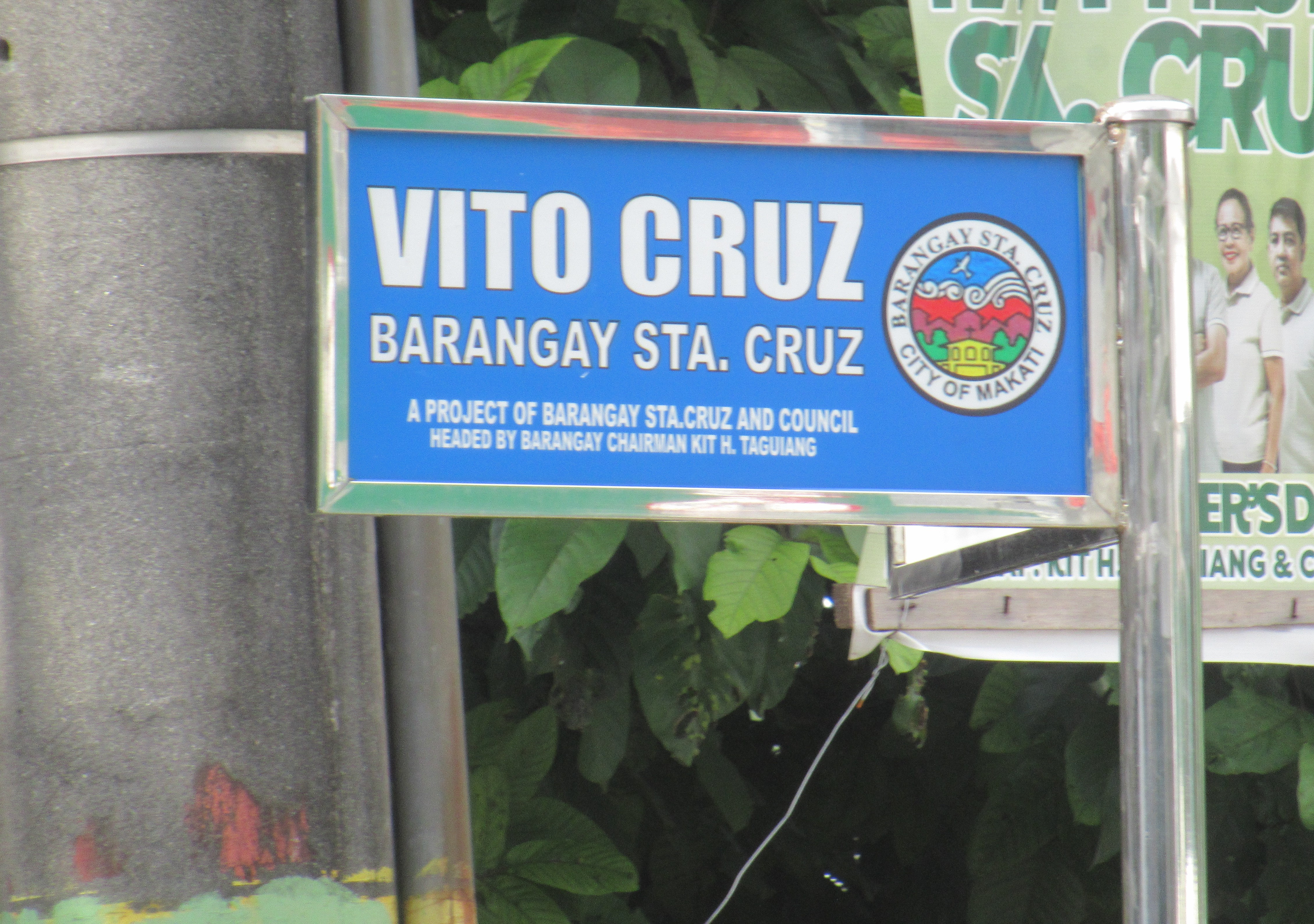
A street sign in Makati bearing the street's old name, Vito Cruz

The street is previously called Vito Cruz Street after Hermógenes Vito Cruz, the 19th-century mayor of Pineda (present-day Pasay). Its section in south central Malate was known as Calle Lico (after the area of the same name) and Calle Connor, respectively, when it was then a short street in the district before extending towards the Manila South Cemetery.

== Route description ==
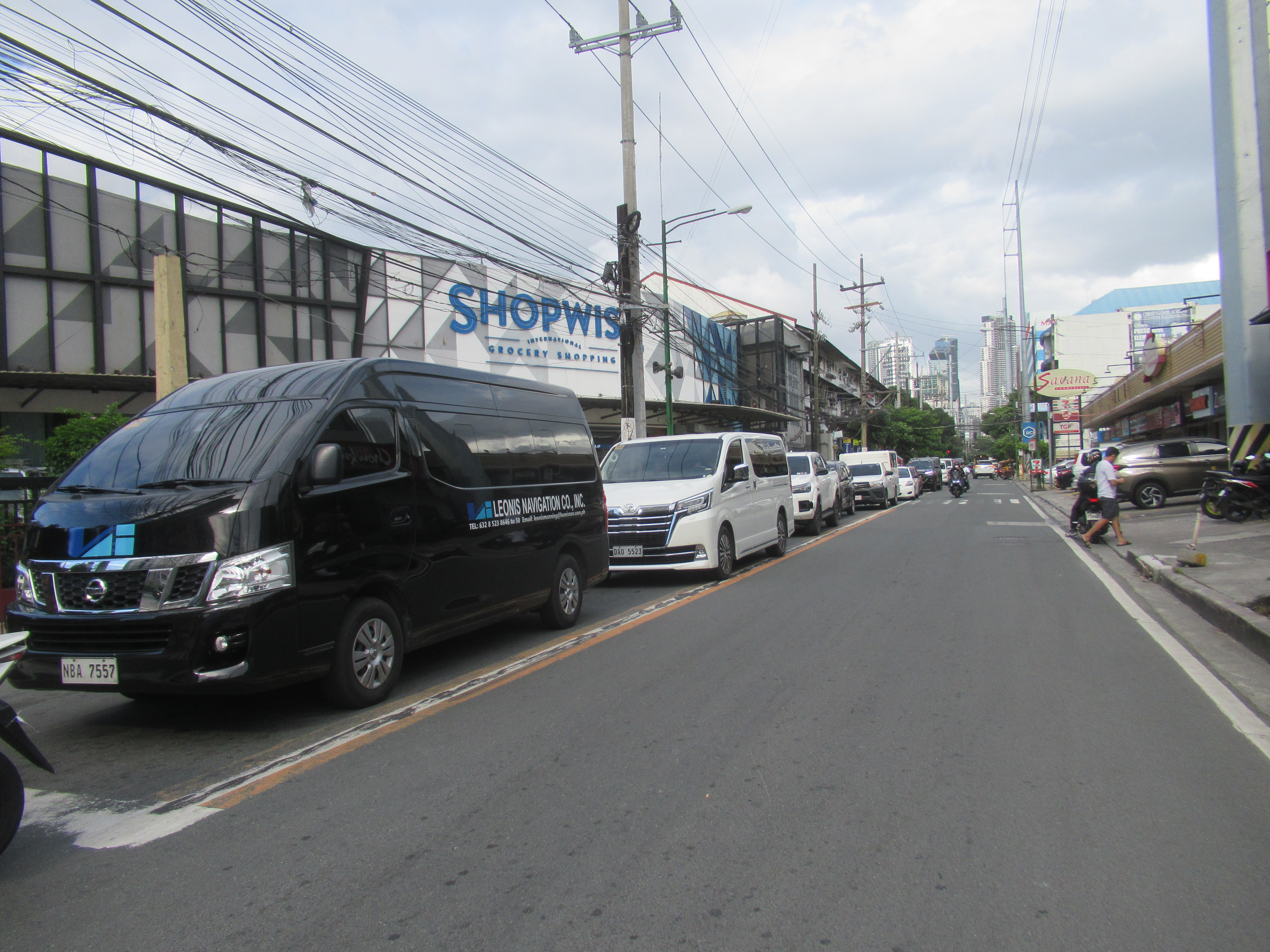
Vito Cruz Extension in Makati

The Manila section runs from the intersection of Roxas Boulevard and Pedro Bukaneg Street, near the Cultural Center of the Philippines. It heads east through the city's southern limits in Malate district. It crosses Harrison Street, Adriatico Street, and Taft Avenue, passing beneath LRT Line 1. From there, it continues another kilometer past the Singalong area and southwestern San Andres district toward Osmeña Highway. Upon entering Makati east of Osmeña Highway, the road turns east at Kamagong Street, where it becomes Ocampo Street Extension or Vito Cruz Street Extension. It passes through barangays La Paz, San Antonio, and Santa Cruz in northwestern Makati until it meets its eastern terminus at South Avenue, west of the Manila South Cemetery. The street carries two-way traffic, except for its section from Taft Avenue to Arellano Street, which carries one-way eastbound traffic and from Arellano Street to Chino Roces Avenue, which carries one-way westbound traffic.

== Intersections ==
Province	City/Municipality	km	mi	Destinations	Notes
Makati				South Avenue	Traffic light intersection, eastern terminus
Makati				Kakarong Street	One-way road to Vito Cruz
Makati				Zapote Street	Traffic light intersection
Makati		0.6	0.37	Chino Roces Avenue	Traffic light intersection, road becomes one-way westbound.
Makati				Sampaloc / Flordeliz Street	
Makati				ABC Street	Access to Rafael Palma Elementary School
Manila		0.5	0.31	Zobel Roxas Street / Agata Street	Traffic light intersection, Agata Street is one-way towards Dagonoy Street
Manila				N145 (Osmeña Highway); R-3	Traffic light intersection
Manila				Alejo Aquino Street	One-way road
Manila				Dian Street	
Manila				Bautista Street	
Manila				Arellano Street	Street becomes one-way road eastbound.
Manila				Muñoz Street / Tramo Street	Traffic light intersection
Manila				Leon Guinto Street	Eastbound entrance
Manila				N170 (Taft Avenue); R-2	Traffic light intersection, street becomes two-way
Manila				Donada Street	Eastbound entrance
Manila				Leveriza Street	Eastbound exit
Manila				Adriatico Street	Traffic light intersection
Manila				Mabini Street / Harrison Street	Traffic light intersection.
Manila				AH 26 (N120) (Roxas Boulevard); R-1	Traffic light intersection and western terminus. Continues to CCP Complex as Bukaneg Street.
1.000 mi = 1.609 km; 1.000 km = 0.621 mi: Concurrency terminus; Incomplete access

== Landmarks ==
Pablo Ocampo Street is the site of the Rizal Memorial Sports Complex, with the art deco-style Rizal Memorial Baseball Stadium fronting the intersection with Adriatico Street and the Rizal Memorial Coliseum just behind it. On the opposite corner of Adriatico are Century Park Hotel and Harrison Plaza, one of Manila's first modern shopping centers. Across the street from the plaza is the Embassy of Vietnam, Fo Guang Shan Mabuhay Temple and Orchid Garden Suites. The street also hosts the Bangko Sentral ng Pilipinas headquarters at the junction with Roxas Boulevard, where Legaspi Towers 300 is also located. Near the intersection with Taft Avenue are several condominium towers, such as the Cityland Vito Cruz Towers and Torre Lorenzo.

The street also provides access to the De La Salle University and De La Salle–College of Saint Benilde campuses located just north of the intersection with Taft Avenue. Arellano University School of Law is also accessible via Donada Street, a street connected to Vito Cruz. It is also the site of Saint Scholastica's College and School of Arts and Design of De La Salle–College of Saint Benilde, which houses the Museum of Contemporary Art and Design. In the San Andres and Makati areas east of Osmeña Highway, the street hosts the Rafael Palma Elementary School, Kingswood Towers, Savana Market, Shopwise Makati, the relocated Mapúa University Makati Campus, and the Manila South Cemetery at its terminus.

The street is also served by the Vito Cruz LRT Station along Taft Avenue and the Vito Cruz railway station along Osmeña Highway.

== See also ==
- Major roads in Manila
- List of renamed streets in Manila
