= Osmeña Highway =

Major road in Metro Manila, Philippines

R-3 Osmeña Highway
- South Superhighway; President Sergio Osmeña Sr. Highway
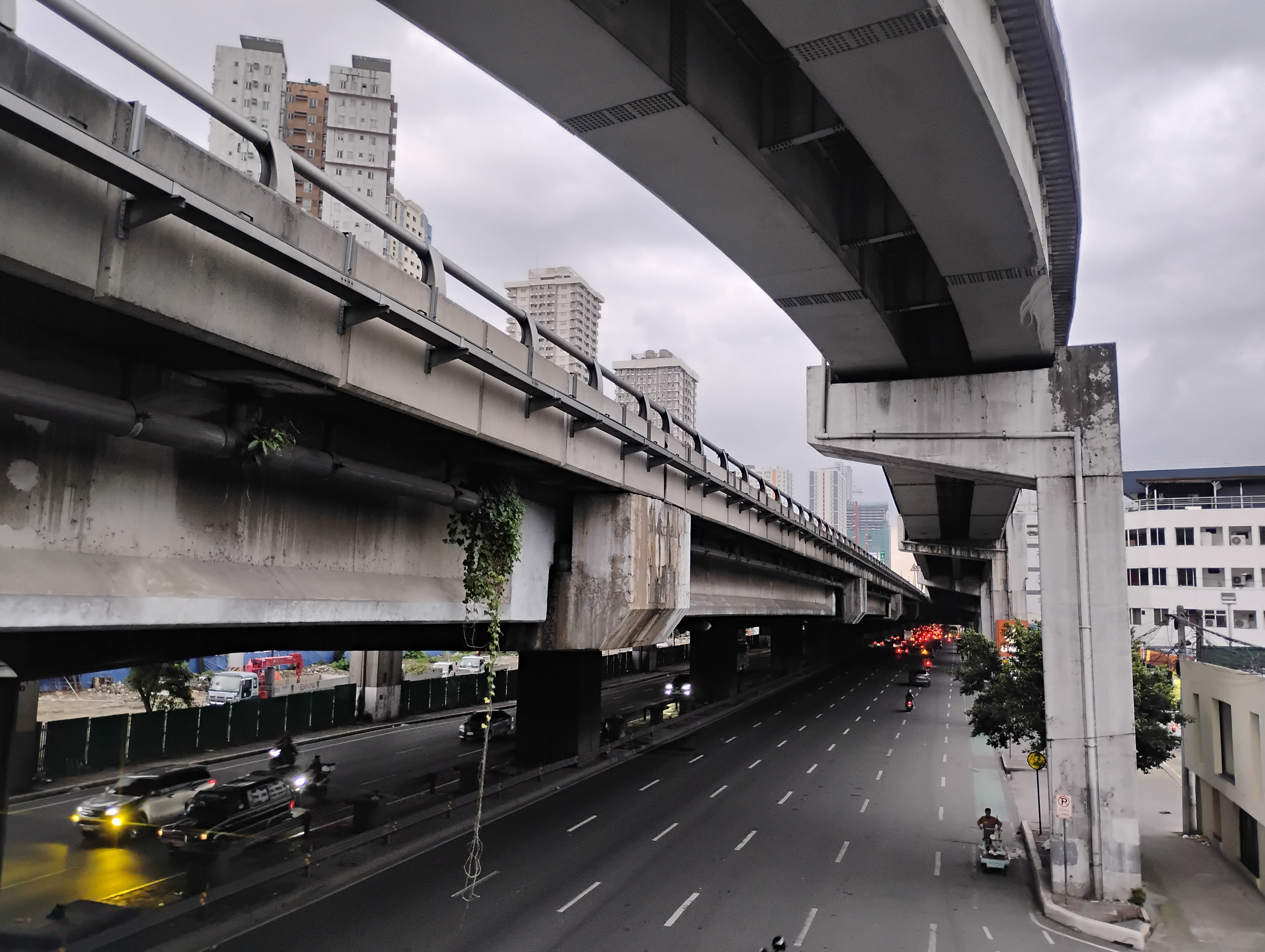
- Osmeña Highway beneath Skyway in Makati

Route information
- Maintained by Department of Public Works and Highways and Metropolitan Manila Development Authority
- Length: 4.6 km (2.9 mi) Approximate length
- Existed: 1960s–present
- Component highways: N145; R-3 R-3

Major junctions
- North end: N140 (Quirino Avenue) in Paco, Manila
- N190 (Gil Puyat Avenue) in Makati
- South end: AH 26 (N1) (EDSA) / AH 26 (E2) (South Luzon Expressway) in Makati

Location
- Country: Philippines
- Major cities: Manila and Makati

Highway system
- Roads in the Philippines; Highways; Expressways; List

The President Sergio Osmeña Sr. Highway (often shortened as Osmeña Highway), also known as the South Superhighway, is a 4.595-kilometer (2.855 mi) major highway that links Quirino Avenue in Paco, Manila to Epifanio de los Santos Avenue (EDSA) and South Luzon Expressway (SLEX) at the Magallanes Interchange in Makati.

The highway is designated as a component of National Route 145 (N145) of the Philippine highway network and Radial Road 3 (R-3) of Metro Manila's arterial road network.

== Name ==
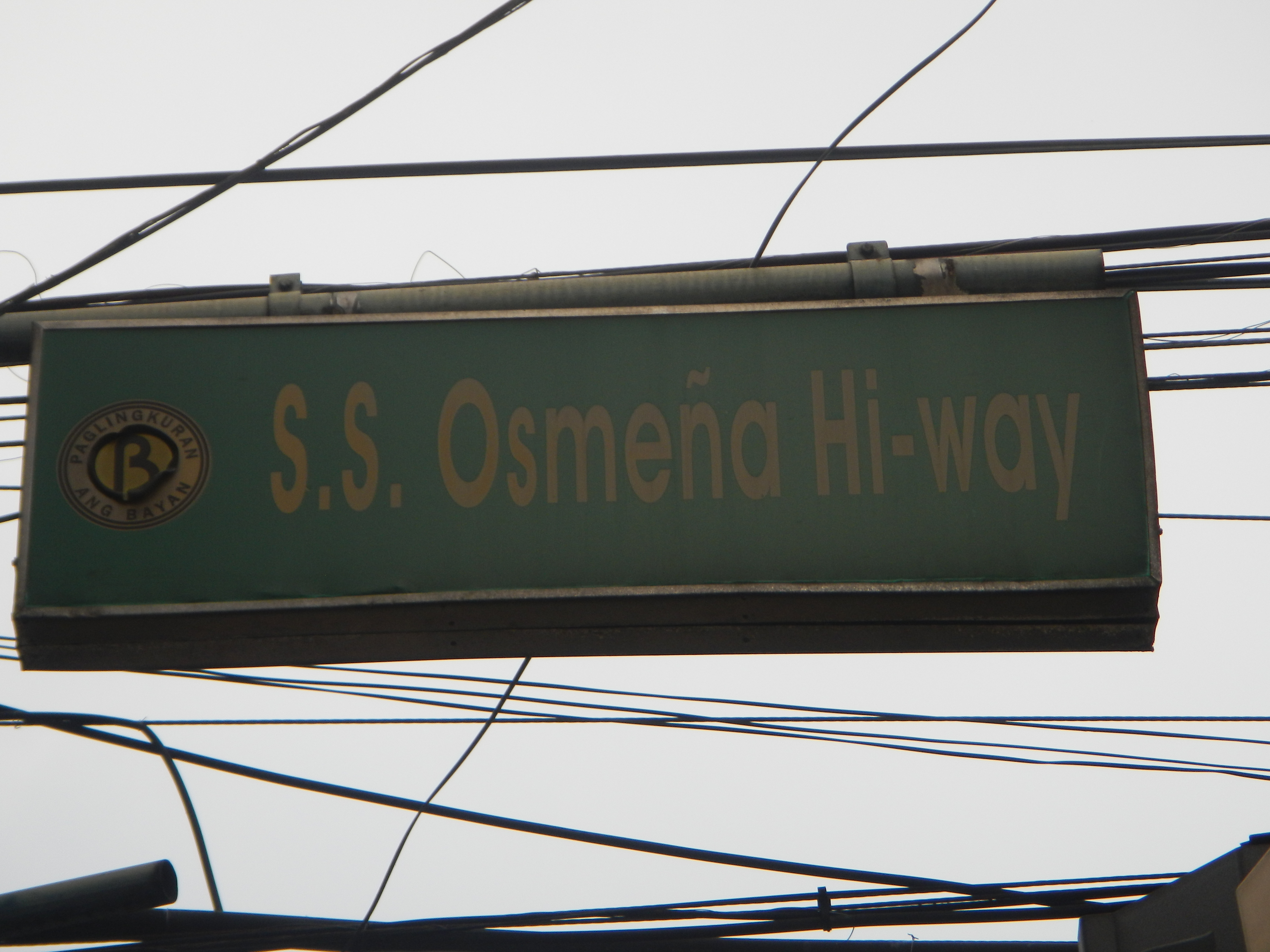
An illuminated street sign of Osmeña Highway in Makati, displaying "S.S. Osmeña Hi-way"

President Sergio Osmeña Sr. Highway (Osmeña Highway) is named after Sergio Osmeña, the fourth President of the Philippines. Since 1989, its name has also been alternatively applied to South Luzon Expressway's section from Magallanes Interchange in Makati to kilometer 28.387 in San Pedro, Laguna. It was also used further south in Laguna up to Calamba until it was renamed in 1992 after Dr. José Rizal.

South Superhighway is the older name of the highway and is currently more widely used alternatively. It is also the alternative name of the tolled South Luzon Expressway from Magallanes Interchange in Makati to the end of SLEX and starting point of STAR Tollway in Santo Tomas, Batangas. It was also known as and forms part of Manila South Diversion Road or simply South Diversion Road.

== Route description ==
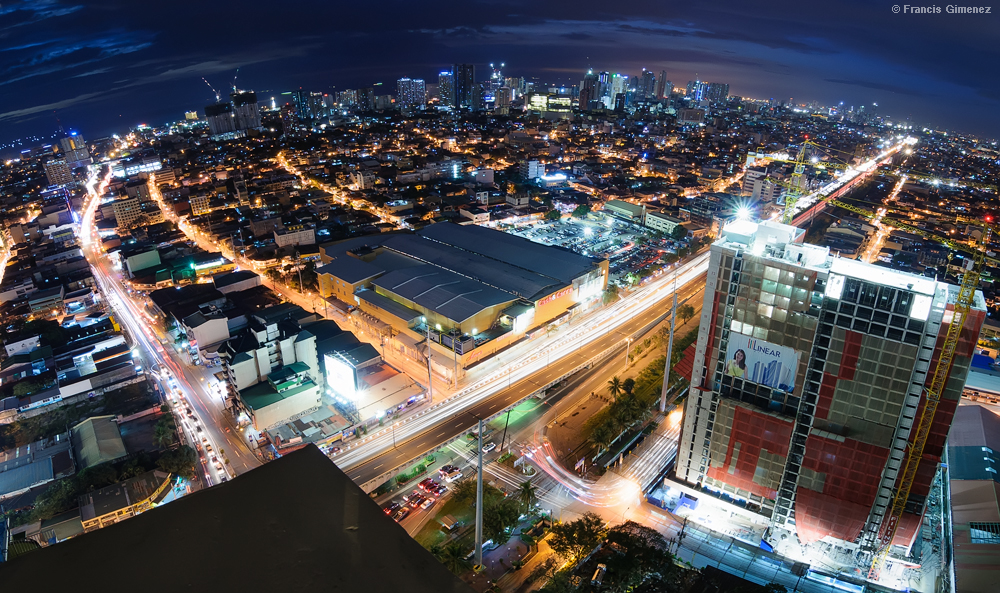
Osmeña Highway (pictured in 2013) facing towards Manila, with the Buendia Flyover in the foreground, taken prior to the construction of Skyway Stage 3

The highway starts at a traffic light intersection with Quirino Avenue in Paco, Manila. It traverses the districts of Malate and San Andres Bukid and crosses San Andres Street, Ocampo Street, and Zobel Roxas Street. It then enters the city of Makati and climbs over to pass above Gil Puyat Avenue through the Osmeña Flyover (also known as Buendia Flyover), with service roads to serve that avenue and several side streets. The first stage of the elevated Skyway starts on the ramps past the flyover. Osmeña Highway crosses Arnaiz Avenue and soon crosses over EDSA at the Magallanes Interchange, where the highway continues south as the South Luzon Expressway. Most of it parallels the PNR Metro South Commuter Line and runs under Skyway.

The Paco–Muntinlupa segment of the Sucat–Paco–Araneta–Balintawak transmission line of National Grid Corporation of the Philippines (NGCP) uses the highway right of way from Quirino Avenue to Magallanes Interchange.

=== Road maintenance ===
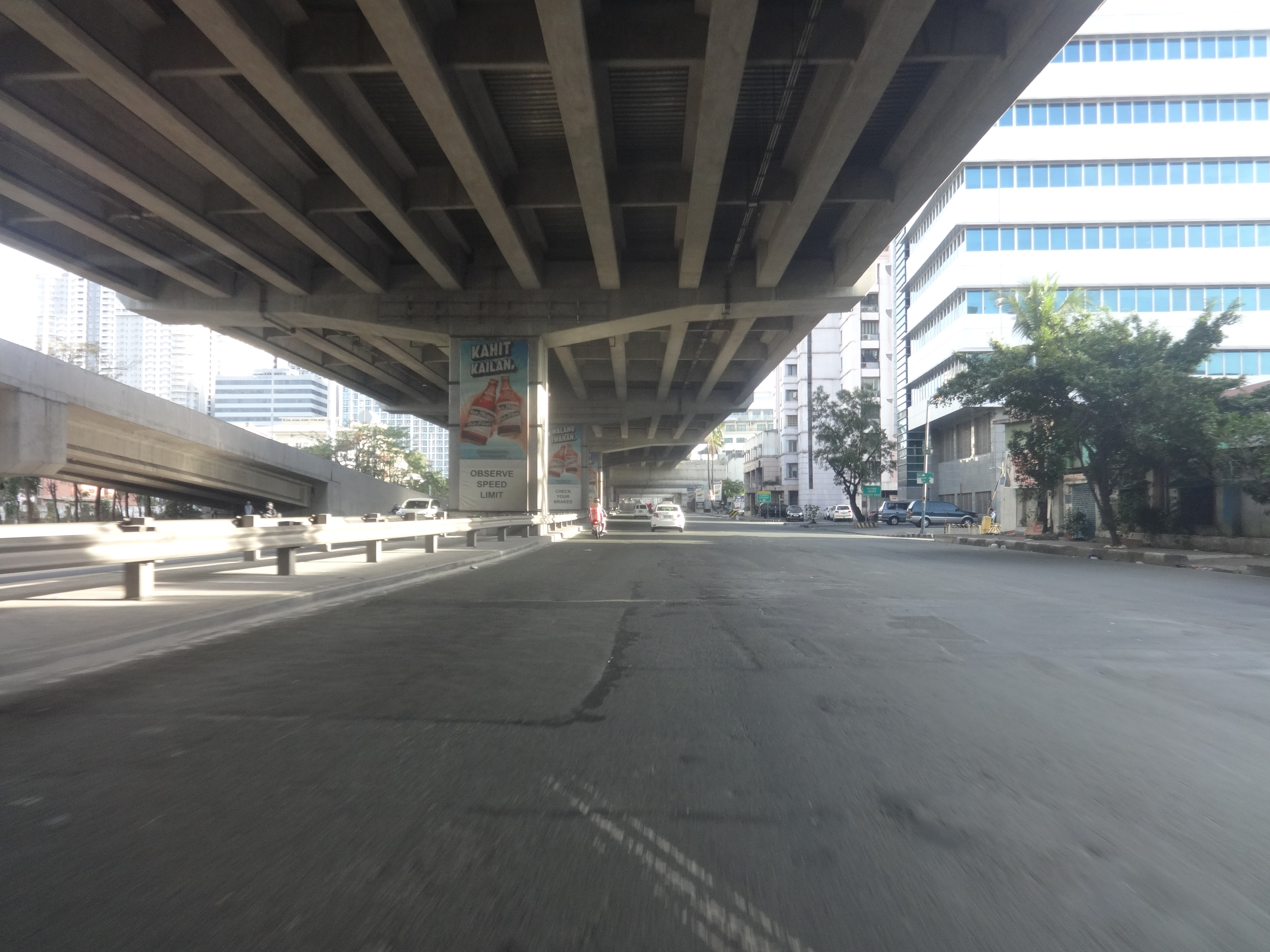
Osmeña Highway southbound beneath Skyway Stage 3 in Makati

The entire highway is classified as a national secondary road. It is maintained by the Department of Public Works and Highways (DPWH) through the South Manila District Engineering Office and Metro Manila 2nd District Engineering Office in Manila and Makati, respectively. The Metropolitan Manila Development Authority (MMDA) also has jurisdiction over both the tolled and non-tolled segments and maintains motorcycle lanes up to Sales Interchange (Nichols). It also handles traffic management alongside the local governments of Manila and Makati.

Apparently, Skyway Operations and Maintenance Corporation (SOMCO), the operator of Skyway and a subsidiary of San Miguel Corporation, wanted Osmeña Highway to be under its control, given that the highway runs below Skyway. SOMCO and SMC Tollways consider the highway's section from Buendia to Magallanes as part of Skyway At-Grade as it runs beneath Skyway Stage 1. However, it was stated that SOMCO and Citra Metro Manila Tollways Corporation (now SMC Skyway Corporation), the concession holder of Skyway Stage 1, do not have jurisdiction over toll-free roads, including Osmeña Highway.

== History ==
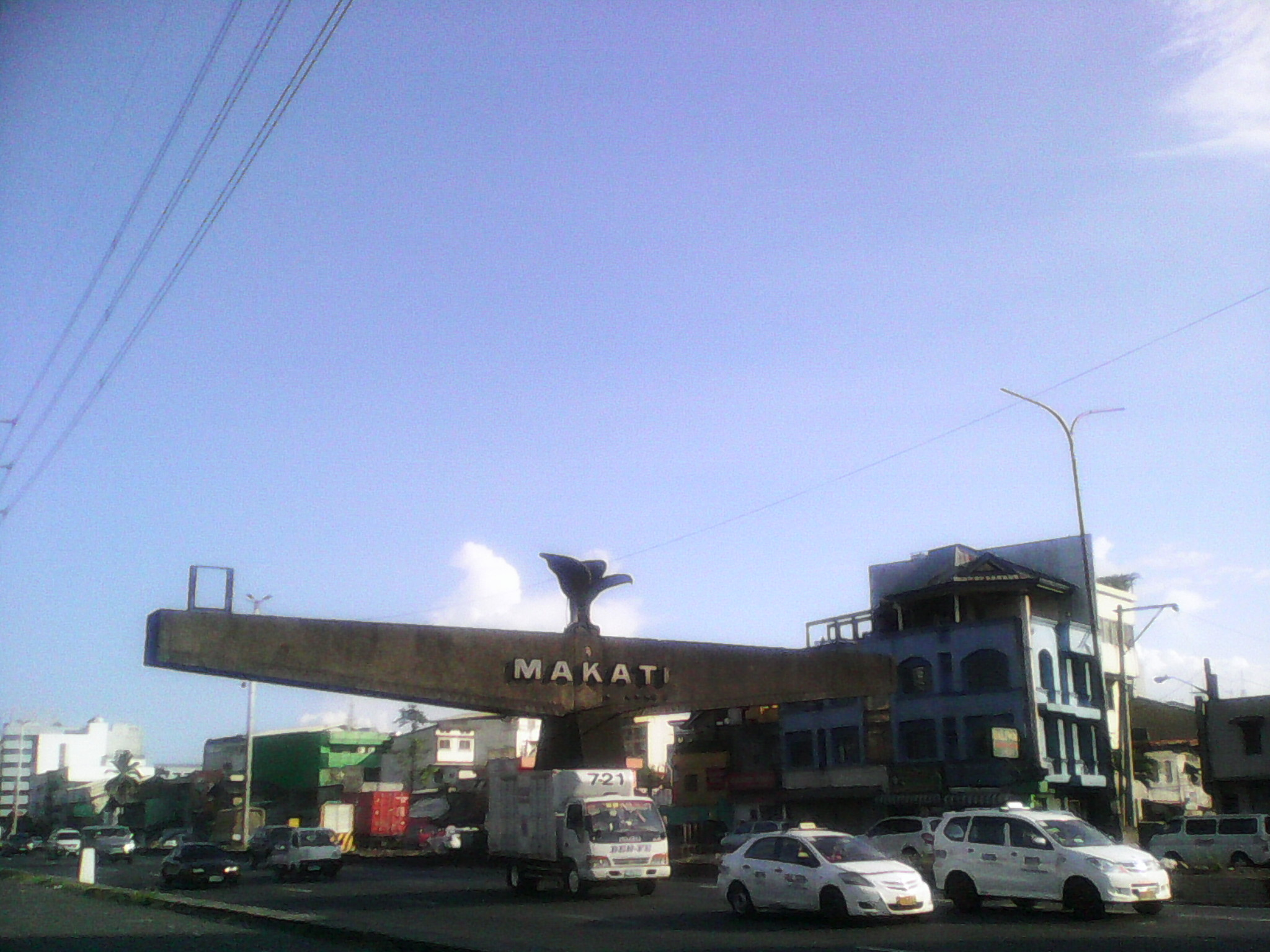
The arch near the Makati–Manila boundary in 2014, prior to the construction of Skyway Stage 3

The highway was built in the 1960s as part of the newer road connecting Manila and Southern Luzon, called Manila South Diversion Road (MSDR) or South Superhighway. It was built parallel to the Philippine National Railway's Batangas extension line, occupying the old Hernandez Street in San Andres, Manila and old streets through Palanan, Culiculi (now Pio del Pilar), and Bangkal (Barcal) in Makati. The flyover that crosses above Buendia Avenue, formerly known as the Buendia-MSDR Overpass Project, was built in 1979.

The highway was renamed in 1989 to President Sergio Osmeña Sr. Highway by virtue of Republic Act No. 6760. The center island of Osmeña Highway's section from Zobel Roxas to EDSA underwent repairs by the then-municipal government of Makati in 1994. The highway was also involved in the construction of Skyway Stage 1, built above its section south of Buendia, from 1995 to 1998. The Osmeña Flyover underwent repairs in 2011. The highway would once again become involved in another Skyway construction, this time Skyway Stage 3, built above its section north of Buendia as Stage 1's continuation, which commenced in 2014. With this, the Makati–Manila boundary marker on the highway was demolished in November 2014.

== Transportation ==
Osmeña Highway is accessed through jeepneys, taxis, and buses. Running parallel to the PNR Metro South Commuter Line, the highway is served by Philippine National Railways (PNR) stations, namely San Andres, Vito Cruz, Dela Rosa (replacing Buendia), Pasay Road, and EDSA (interchange to MRT Line 3 at Magallanes station). The line's operations have been suspended since March 27, 2024, to make way for the construction of the elevated North–South Commuter Railway tracks above it.

== Intersections ==
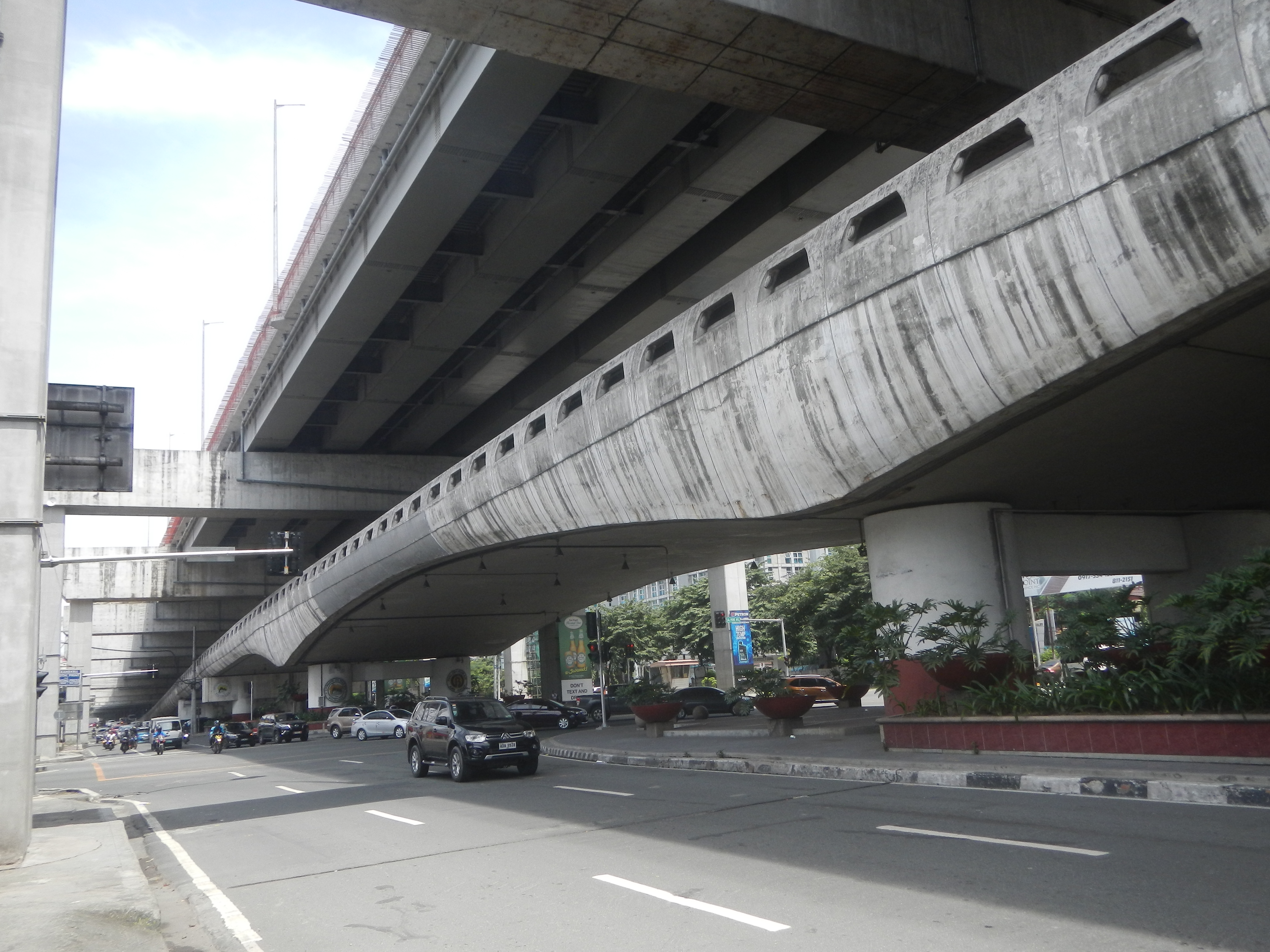
Osmeña Highway's intersection with Gil Puyat Avenue beneath Osmeña Flyover and Skyway

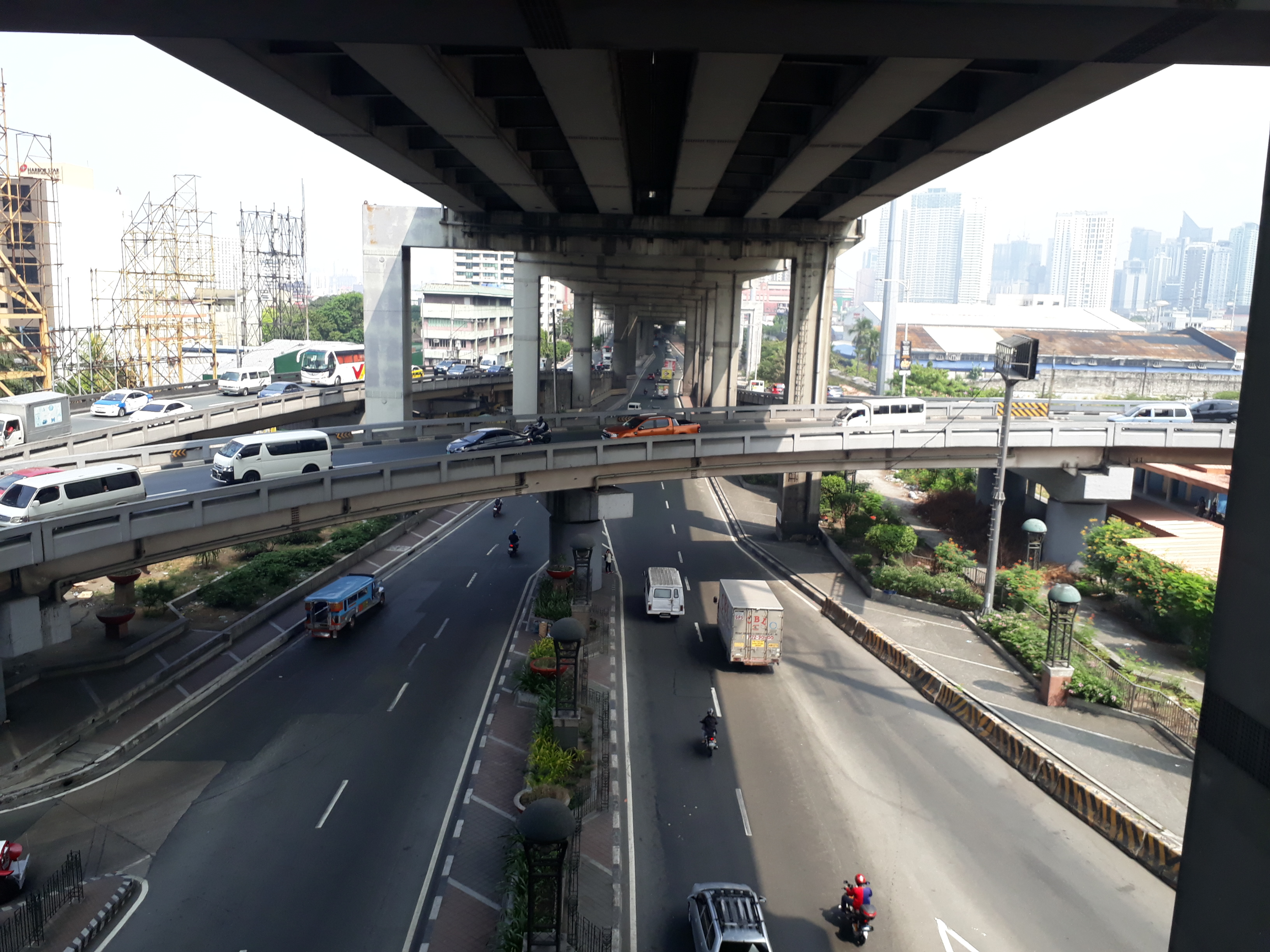
The southern end of Osmeña Highway at Magallanes Interchange

Intersections are numbered by kilometer posts, with Rizal Park in Manila designated as kilometer zero.

Province	City/Municipality	km	mi	Destinations	Notes
Manila		4.090	2.541	N140 (Quirino Avenue)	Traffic light intersection. Northern terminus.
Manila				Skyway	Quirino Exit of Skyway; northbound entrance and pending future southbound exit
Manila		4.150	2.579	South Superhighway Bridge #1 over Estero de Paco	
Manila				South Superhighway Bridge #2 over Estero de Tripa de Gallina	
Manila		4.650	2.889	San Andres Street	Traffic light intersection; no left turn allowed on both sides.
Manila				Arellano Street	Southbound access only
Manila				Estrada Street	Southbound access only
Manila		5.430	3.374	Ocampo Street	Traffic light intersection; one-way street. No left turn allowed from northbound.
Manila – Makati boundary		5.490	3.411	Zobel Roxas Street	Traffic light intersection; one-way street.
Makati				Skyway	Buendia (Zobel) Exit of Skyway; southbound entrance
Makati				Arellano Street	Southbound access only
Makati				Skyway	Buendia (Zobel) Exit of Skyway; northbound exit
Makati		7.552	4.693	Calatagan Bridge over Calatagan Creek	
Makati				North end of Osmeña Flyover	
Makati				Emilia Street, Malugay Street	Traffic light intersection; no entry to Osmeña Highway from Emilia Street
Makati				N190 (Buendia Avenue)	Traffic light intersection
Makati				Finlandia Street, Dela Rosa Street	Traffic light intersection; no left turn allowed from northbound
Makati				South end of Osmeña Flyover	
Makati				Faraday Street	Southbound access only
Makati		6.750	4.194	AH 26 (E2) (Skyway)	Buendia Exit of Skyway; southbound exit and northbound entrance
Makati		7.320	4.548	Arnaiz Avenue	Traffic light intersection; no left turn allowed from southbound
Makati		7.800	4.847	Don Bosco Street	Northbound access only
Makati				AH 26 (E2) (Skyway)	Don Bosco Exit of Skyway; northbound entrance
Makati				Makati Diversion Channel Bridge over Makati Diversion Channel	
Makati		8.710	5.412	AH 26 (N1) (EDSA)	Magallanes Interchange (Southern terminus); continues south as AH 26 (E2) (SLEX)
1.000 mi = 1.609 km; 1.000 km = 0.621 mi: Incomplete access

== Landmarks ==
This is from north (Quirino Avenue) to south (EDSA and SLEX):

- San Andres station
- Vito Cruz station (PNR)
- Cash & Carry Supermarket
- SM Hypermarket Makati
- Dela Rosa station
- Pasay Road station
- EDSA station (PNR)
- Magallanes interchange
