= San Andres station =

Railroad station in the Philippines

San Andres
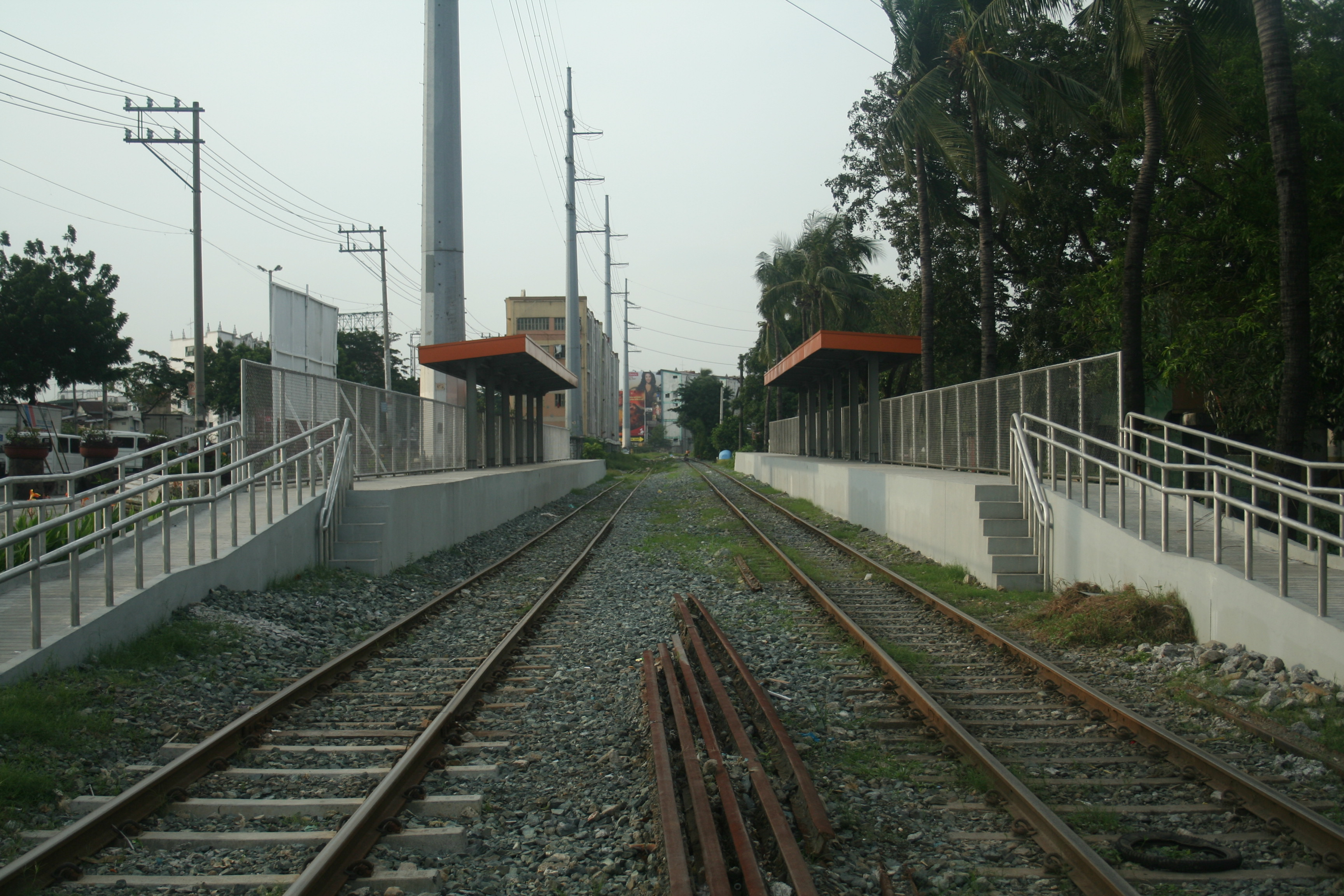
- Trackbed and platform area of San Andres station

General information
- Location: Osmeña Highway corner Diamante Street, San Andres
- Coordinates: 14°34′22.60″N 120°59′58.65″E
- Owner: Philippine National Railways
- Operator: Philippine National Railways
- Lines: South Main Line; Planned: South Commuter
- Platforms: Side platforms
- Tracks: 2
- Connections: Jeepneys and buses

Construction
- Structure type: At grade
- Accessible: yes

Other information
- Station code: SAN

History
- Opened: c. 1929 (original); March 24, 2010 (current)
- Closed: March 28, 2024

Services
Preceding station	PNR	Following station
Paco towards Tutuban	Metro South Commuter	Vito Cruz railway towards IRRI
Location
- Location within Manila Location within Metro Manila Location within Luzon Location within Philippines

San Andres station is a railway station located on the South Main Line in the city of Manila, Philippines.

San Andres station is the seventh station southbound from Tutuban.

== History ==
The original San Andres station was opened around 1929 as a flag stop on the defunct Naic Line and closed in 1936.

A new San Andres station on the Main Line South was opened on March 24, 2010 for commuter services.

On March 28, 2024, station operations were temporarily suspended to make way for the construction of the North–South Commuter Railway.

== Nearby landmarks ==
The station is near the Singalong sub-district of San Andres, the Dagonoy Public Market, Puregold Extra, and St. Anthony's School, Manila. Further away from the station are the Bureau of Plant Industry, Ermita, and the Manila Zoo.

== Transportation links ==
San Andres station is accessible by jeepneys plying the San Andres route, as well as buses plying routes on Osmeña Highway. A LRT-1 station, Quirino, is located further up San Andres Street on the intersection with Taft Avenue.

== Station layout ==
L1; Platforms	Side platform, doors will open on the right
L1; Platforms	Platform A	PNR Metro Commuter towards Tutuban (←)
L1; Platforms	Platform B	PNR Metro Commuter towards Alabang (→)
L1; Platforms	Side platform, doors will open on the right
L1	Concourse/ Street Level	Ticket Booths, Station Control, Shops
