= Chino Roces Avenue =

Road in Metro Manila, Philippines

Coordinates: 14°33′17″N 121°0′49″E

- Pasong Tamo
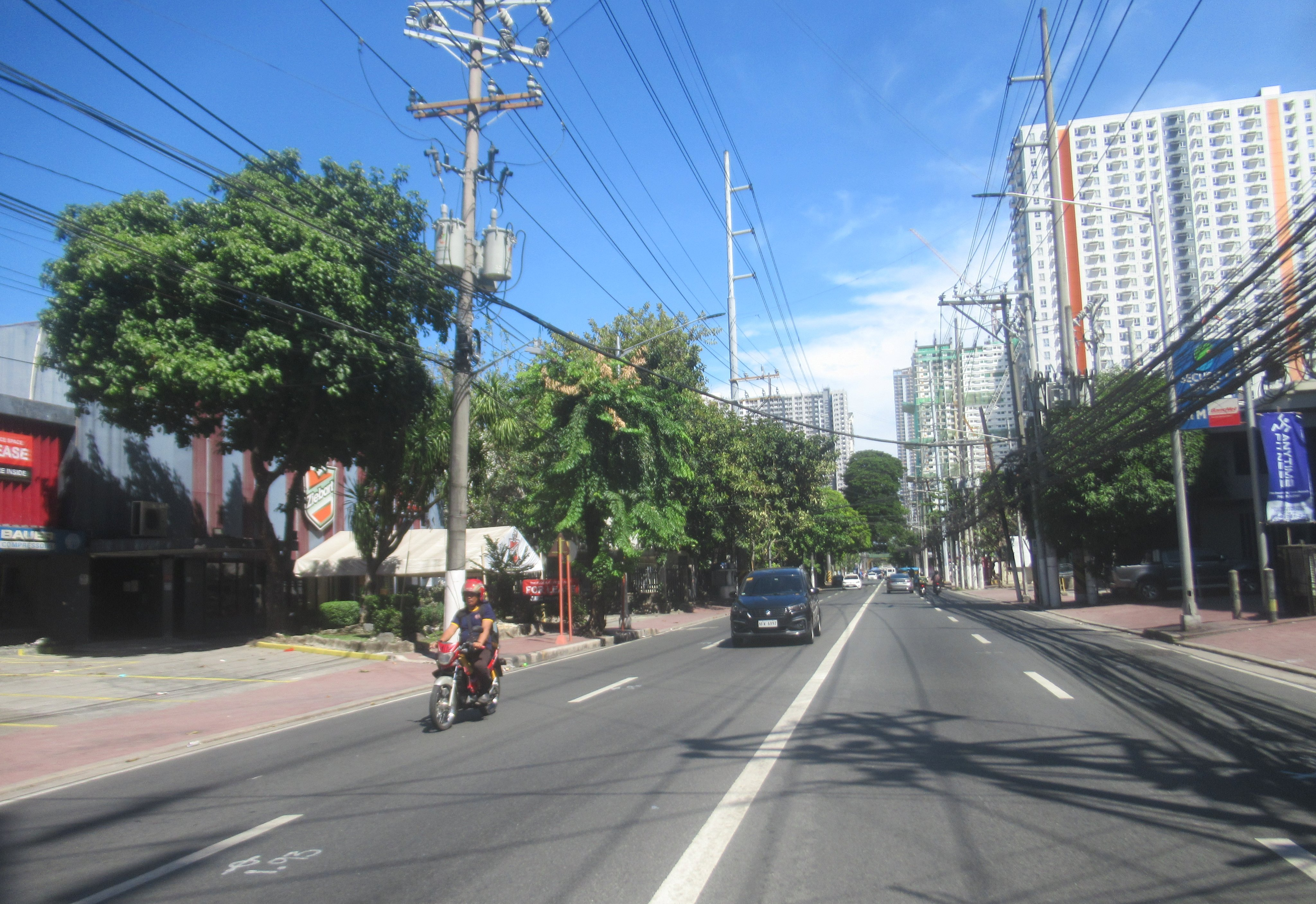
- Chino Roces Avenue southbound in Bangkal, towards the Magallanes Interchange
- Interactive map of Chino Roces Avenue
- Namesake: Joaquin "Chino" Roces
- Type: Tertiary road
- Maintained by: Department of Public Works and Highways - Metro Manila 2nd District Engineering Office
- Length: 5.80 km (3.60 mi); Includes 2.12 km (1.32 mi) extension south of EDSA
- Location: Makati and Taguig
- North end: J. P. Rizal Avenue and A.P. Reyes Street in Tejeros and Olympia, Makati
- Major junctions: Kalayaan Avenue; Ocampo Street; N190 (Gil Puyat Avenue); Dela Rosa Street; Arnaiz Avenue; AH 26 (N1) (Epifanio de los Santos Avenue)
- South end: Lawton Avenue in Fort Bonifacio and Western Bicutan, Taguig

Chino Roces Avenue, formerly known as (and still commonly referred to as) Pasong Tamo, is a prominent north–south road in Makati and Taguig, Metro Manila, Philippines. It runs 5.80 kilometers (3.60 miles) from Olympia and Tejeros to Fort Bonifacio. The avenue is named after the Filipino journalist Joaquin "Chino" Roces. The fact that the avenue is the location of various media establishments influenced the renaming.

== Etymology ==
The avenue is named after Joaquin "Chino" Roces, a journalist who founded The Manila Times and Associated Broadcasting Company (ABC, now TV5) and an opposition figure during the Marcos Sr. administration. The name was chosen because media establishments, including Philippines Free Press and ABC's first studios, were put up along the avenue, making it the most fitting place to honor Roces as a journalist.

It is commonly known by its former name, Pasong Tamo, which may come from:

- an indigenous plant called tamo that once grew there abundantly, or
- a former barrio in Caloocan and now a barangay in Quezon City where the Battle of Pasong Tamo occurred, as suggested by surrounding streets in Olympia and Tejeros named similar to places that played significant roles during the Philippine Revolution (e.g. Malolos, Barasoain, Novaliches, Binakod, Zapote).

== Route description ==
The northern end of Chino Roces Avenue is at the intersection with J. P. Rizal Avenue. It heads southwesterly across the residential and commercial barangays of Olympia, Tejeros, Santa Cruz, and La Paz. After the intersection with Yakal Street in San Antonio, the avenue bends to the south, becoming more commercial as it approaches Gil Puyat Avenue. The road continues southwards through the western limits of the Makati CBD, bending slightly southwesterly between Dela Rosa and Don Bosco Streets. The avenue then becomes mixed commercial and industrial as it continues straight to EDSA.

South of EDSA via a narrow channel under the Magallanes Interchange, its extension serves as a frontage road to the South Luzon Expressway. It is lined with light industries and car dealerships on both sides, as well as a few factory outlets, in an area known as Mantrade or Kayamanan-C. The road ends at Lawton Avenue within Fort Bonifacio in Taguig, near the New Senate Building and Sales Interchange. Chino Roces has a short extension north of J. P. Rizal Avenue into Barangay Carmona as A. P. Reyes Avenue. The part of Chino Roces from Rufino Street to Arnaiz Avenue is home to several Japanese restaurants and shops, earning it the nickname "Little Tokyo".

== History ==
The avenue originated as a short street in what was historically known as Malolos Subdivision, a residential subdivision in Tejeros and Olympia. It was then extended towards Vito Cruz Extension in the 1940s and later towards southern Makati circa 1950s, making it a major road. It was later extended south of EDSA towards Taguig. Originally called Pasong Tamo, it was renamed Chino Roces Avenue by virtue of a Makati resolution in 1988 enacted shortly after its namesake journalist's death.

== Landmarks ==
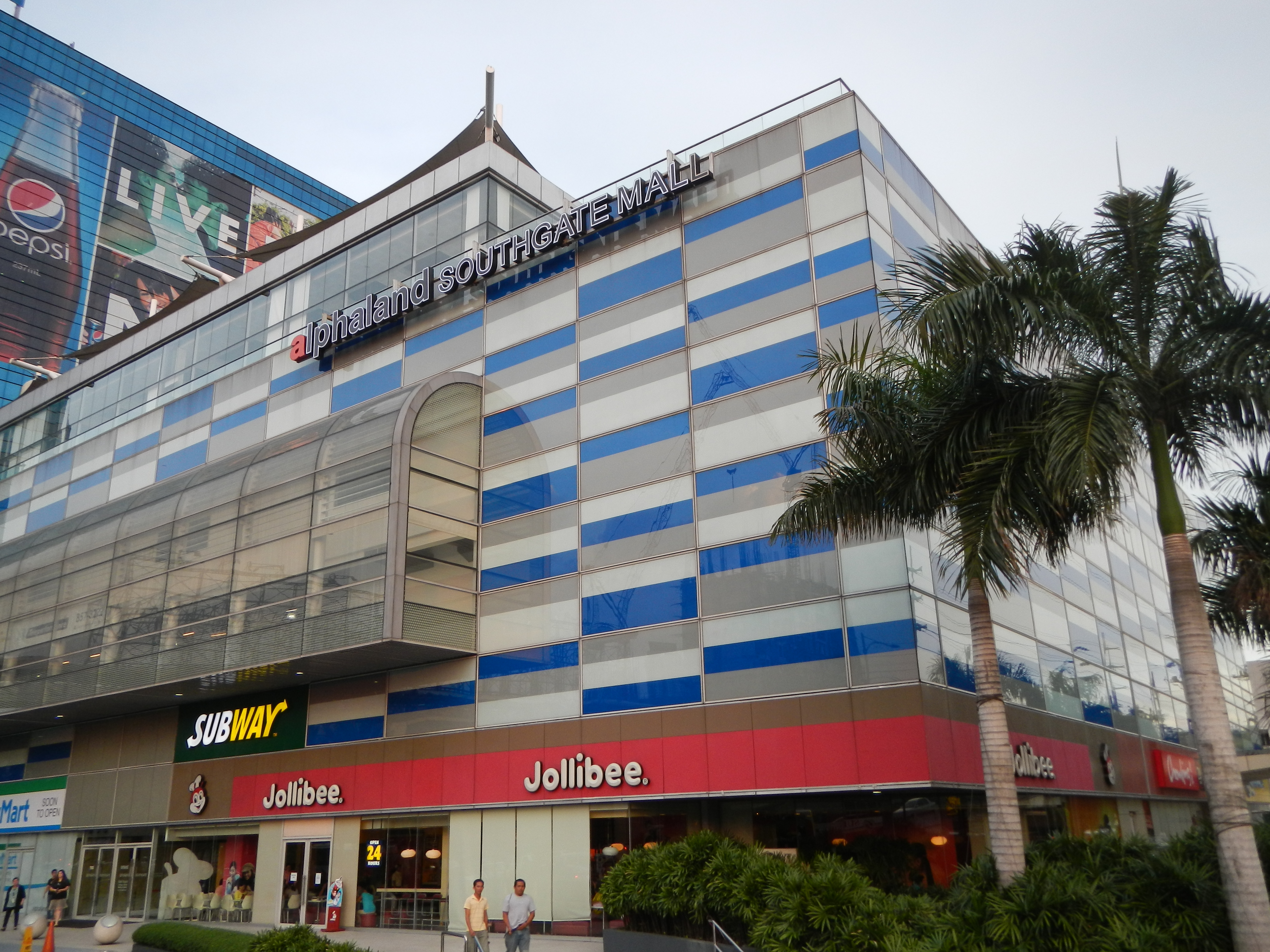
Alphaland Southgate Mall on EDSA and Chino Roces Avenue

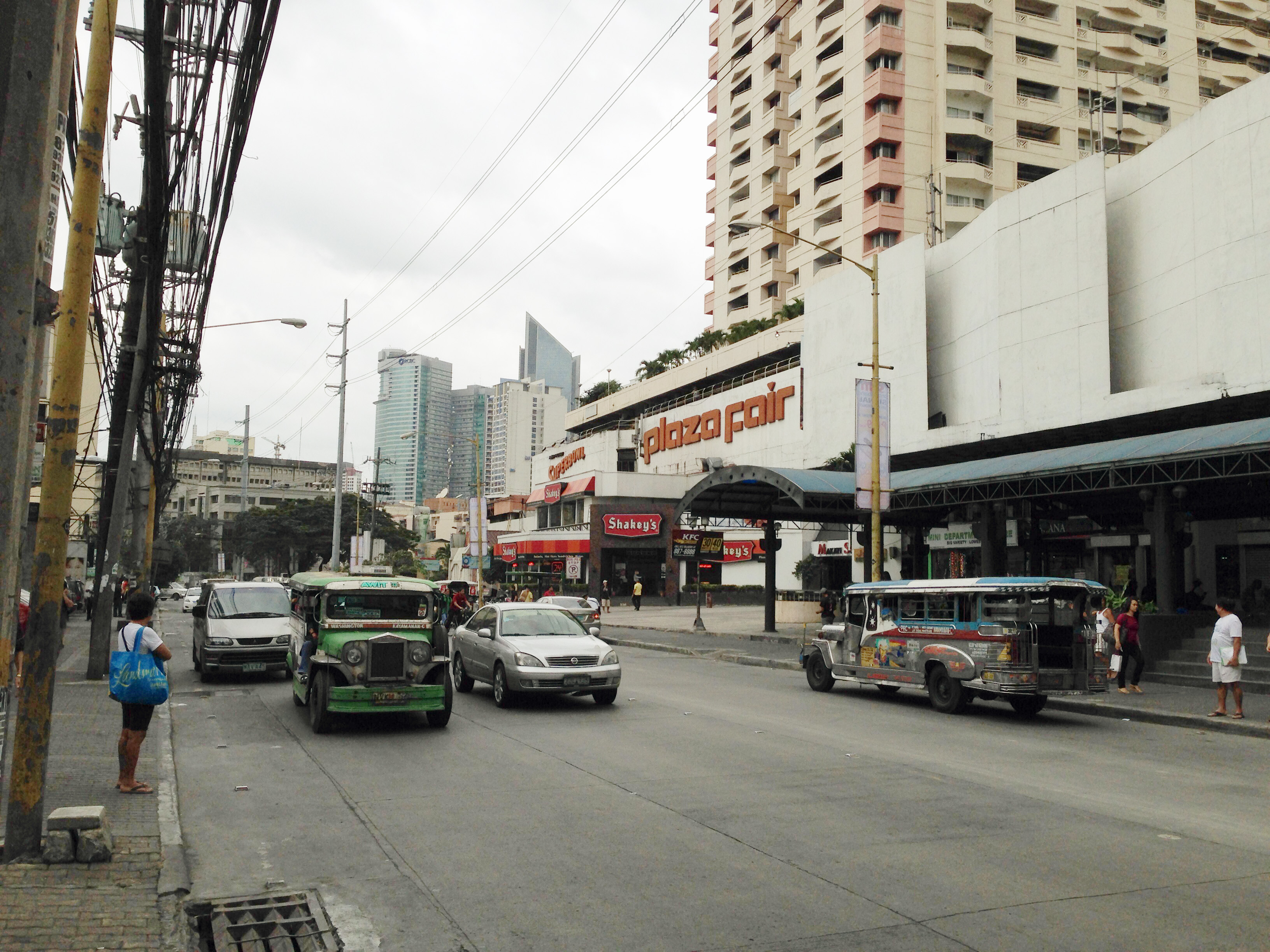
Makati Central Square

- Avida Towers San Lorenzo
- Alphaland Southgate Mall and Tower
- Alegria Building
- Cityland Pasong Tamo Tower
- CW Home Depot
- Directories Philippines Corporation (publisher of the Philippine Yellow Pages)
- Don Bosco Technical Institute, Makati
- DPI XL Studios
- Ecoplaza Building
- Eurotel Makati
- Exportbank Plaza
- Green Sun
- Kingswood Towers
- Little Tokyo
- Laureano De Trevi Towers by Vista Residences
- Leelin Building
- Makati Hope Christian School
- Makati Central Square (formerly Makati Cinema Square)
- Mantrade
- Makati Ford
- Mazda Makati
- Molave Building
- National Nutrition Council Nutrition Building
- New Senate Building (under construction)
- Oriental Garden Condominium
- Philippine Daily Inquirer Building
- San Lorenzo Place
- Shopwise Makati
- The Oriental Place
- The Beacon – Roces Tower
- WalterMart Makati
- Wilcon Depot IT Hub

== Intersections ==
Province	City/Municipality	km	mi	Destinations	Notes
Taguig				Lawton Avenue	Traffic light intersection, southern terminus.
Makati – Taguig boundary				Pasong Tamo Bridge	
Makati				Lumbang Street	Access to Dasmariñas Village.
Makati				AH 26 (N1) (EDSA) – Cubao	Traffic light intersection, southbound traffic diverted to service road beneath Magallanes Interchange.
Makati				Sabio Street	Access to Ecology and San Lorenzo Villages.
Makati				Don Bosco Street	One-way road. Chino Roces becomes one-way traffic northbound.
Makati				Arnaiz Avenue	Traffic light intersection. Chino Roces becomes two-way.
Makati				Fernando Street	Traffic light intersection.
Makati				Herrera Street, S. Javier Street	Traffic light intersection, one-way road.
Makati				Dela Rosa Street	Traffic light intersection, one-way road.
Makati				Urban Avenue	No access to opposite directions.
Makati				N190 (Gil Puyat Avenue)	Traffic light intersection.
Makati				Malugay Street	Traffic light intersection; one-way road towards Ayala Avenue, no left turn from southbound.
Makati				Yakal Street	Traffic light intersection; one-way road towards Mayapis Street.
Makati				Bagtikan Street	Traffic light intersection, one-way road.
Makati				Kamagong Street	Traffic light intersection, one-way road.
Makati				Pablo Ocampo Street, Metropolitan Avenue	Traffic light intersection.
Makati				Mola Street	
Makati				Davila Street	One-way street
Makati				Mascardo Street	One-way street
Makati				Yague Street	
Makati				Ponte Street	
Makati				Montojo Street	
Makati				Solchuaga Street	
Makati				Kalayaan Avenue	Former traffic light intersection.
Makati				Barasoain Street	
Makati				Novaliches Street	
Makati				Malolos Street	
Makati				J.P. Rizal Avenue	Northern terminus, continues north as A.P. Reyes Avenue.
Makati		1.000 mi = 1.609 km; 1.000 km = 0.621 mi: Incomplete access			
