= Vito Cruz station (PNR) =

Train station in Manila, Philippines

Vito Cruz
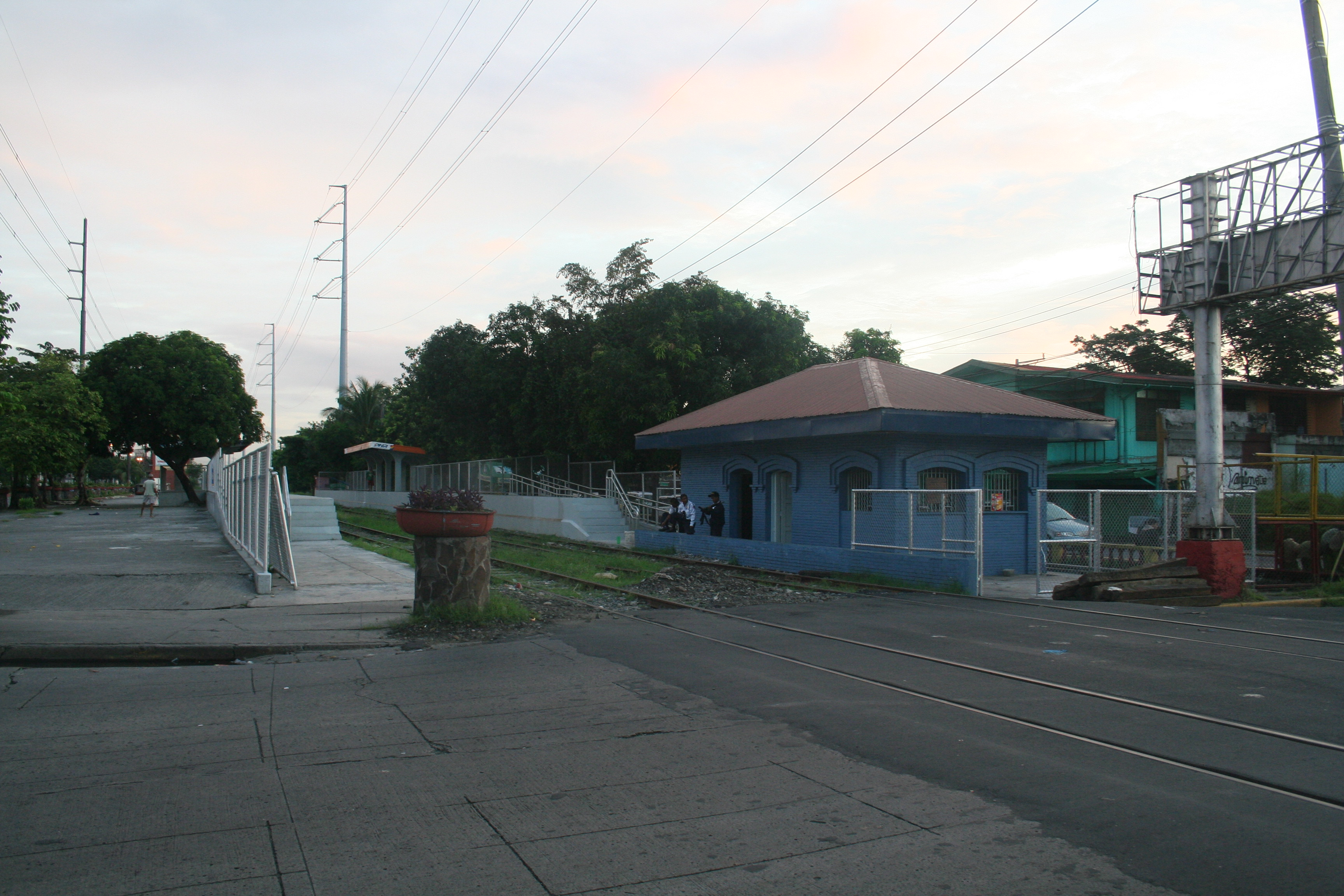
- Exterior of Vito Cruz station

General information
- Location: Osmeña Highway corner Pablo Ocampo Street, San Andres
- Coordinates: 14°34′1.56″N 121°0′10.14″E
- Owner: Philippine National Railways
- Operator: Philippine National Railways
- Lines: South Main Line; Planned: South Commuter
- Platforms: Side platforms
- Tracks: 2
- Connections: Jeepneys, buses, and tricycles

Construction
- Structure type: At-grade
- Accessible: Yes

Other information
- Station code: VTC

History
- Opened: November 24, 1975; 50 years ago
- Closed: March 28, 2024
- Rebuilt: 1990 and 2009

Services
Preceding station	PNR	Following station
San Andres towards Tutuban	Metro South Commuter	Dela Rosa towards IRRI
Location
- Location within Manila Location within Metro Manila Location within Luzon Location within Philippines

Vito Cruz station is a railway station located on the South Main Line in the city of Manila, Philippines. The station derives its name from the former name of the adjacent now Pablo Ocampo Sr. Street, which is Vito Cruz Street, after a former alcalde mayor of Pineda (present-day Pasay).

Vito Cruz is the eighth station from Tutuban and is the last station on the South Main Line physically located in the city of Manila.

== History ==
Vito Cruz, together with Buendia, was opened on November 24, 1975, as part of the 83rd anniversary of the Philippine National Railways.

On March 28, 2024, station operations were temporarily suspended to make way for the construction of the North–South Commuter Railway.

== Nearby landmarks ==
The station serves the district of San Andres in Manila, as well as nearby barangays San Antonio, La Paz, and Palanan in Makati. Adjacent landmarks include Barangay 764's Barangay Action Center along Perlita Street and some commercial establishments. Further away from the station are educational institutions such as the main campus of Arellano University School of Law, the De La Salle University, the De La Salle–College of Saint Benilde and St. Scholastica's College, the Manila South Cemetery.

== Transportation links ==
Vito Cruz station is accessible by jeepneys plying the Zobel Roxas Street route, as well as buses on the Osmeña Highway. A tricycle terminal plying barangay San Antonio in Makati is located across the station on Zobel Roxas Street, while tricycles based in Manila and barangay Palanan, Makati also drop commuters off at the station.

== Station layout ==
L1; Platforms	Side platform, doors will open on the right
L1; Platforms	Platform A	PNR Metro Commuter towards Tutuban (←)
L1; Platforms	Platform B	PNR Metro Commuter towards Alabang (→)
L1; Platforms	Side platform, doors will open on the right
L1	Concourse/ Street Level	Ticket Booths, Station Control

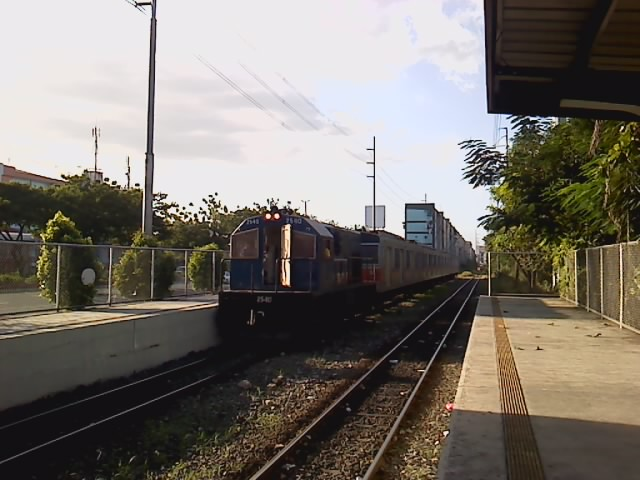
2540 + 4 EMU 203 approaching VTC

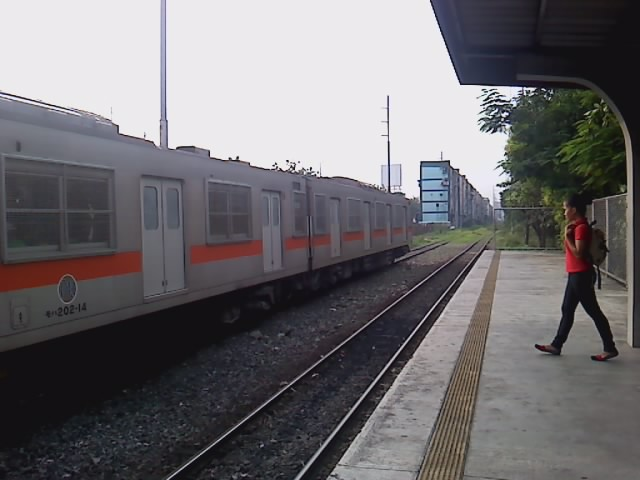
