= Magallanes Interchange =

Road interchange in Makati, Philippines

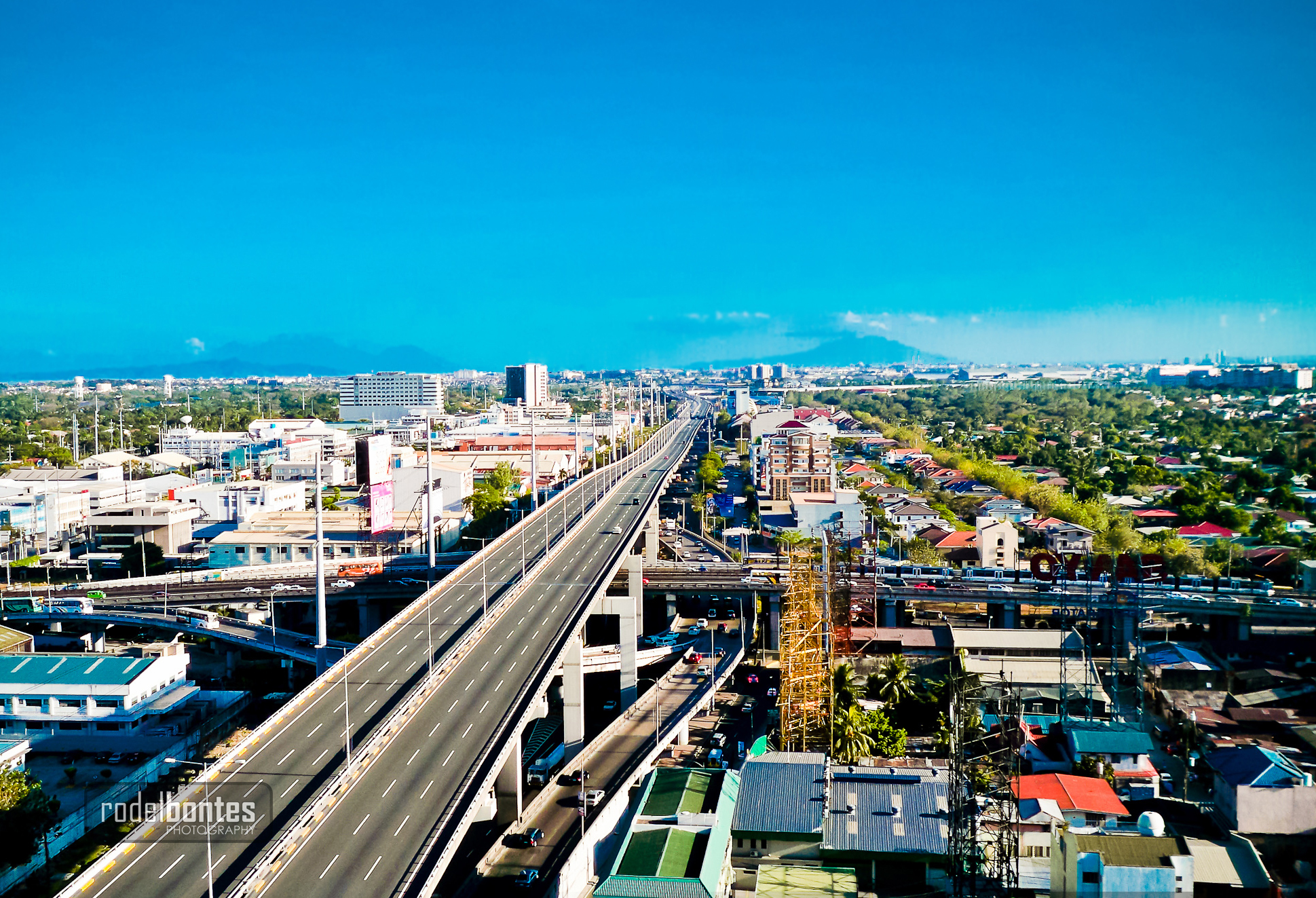
- The Magallanes Interchange in 2010, looking south from the South Luzon Expressway
- Interactive map of Magallanes Interchange

Location
- Makati, Metro Manila, Philippines
- Coordinates: 14°32′25.54″N 121°1′0.74″E
- Roads at junction: N145 (Osmeña Highway); AH 26 (E2) (South Luzon Expressway); AH 26 (N1) (EDSA); Chino Roces Avenue

Construction
- Type: Four-level partial turbine interchange
- Opened: 1975
- Maintained by: Department of Public Works and Highways; Metropolitan Manila Development Authority; Skyway Operations and Maintenance Corporation

The Magallanes Interchange is a four-level partial turbine interchange in Makati, Metro Manila, Philippines. It serves as the junction between the Osmeña Highway, Epifanio de los Santos Avenue (EDSA), and South Luzon Expressway (SLEX) while also intersecting with inner streets and Chino Roces Avenue. It is also an interchange between the two train lines of Metro Manila, the MRT-3, which is over EDSA, and the PNR Metro Commuter Line beside Osmeña Highway and SLEX. It is currently one of the busiest intersections in Metro Manila.

== History ==
After the proposal of President Ferdinand Marcos in 1969 to create six circumferential roads, EDSA, which used to end at Taft Avenue (Manila South Road), was extended to Roxas Boulevard. Thus, an interchange was required between the then-newly built Manila South Diversion Road and EDSA. It opened in 1975 officially as the Manila South Diversion Road–EDSA Interchange. The site, as one of the interchange projects in Metro Manila, was funded through a loan by the Overseas Economic Cooperation Fund (OECF).

The second-level viaduct was opened in 1977.

In 1993, more lighting facilities were installed at the interchange after an ordinance was ratified by the Makati local government. In 2005, the interchange underwent redevelopment and beautification by the Makati local government, opening a park at its ground level.

As of 2026, a new Skyway northbound on-ramp is being constructed along the interchange. The ramp will provide motorists coming from EDSA southbound a direct access to the elevated expressway.

== Traffic management measures ==
The interchange's elevated left-turn portion from Osmena Highway southbound onto EDSA northbound is indefinitely closed as a measure against traffic congestion and accidents in the area. In addition, the portion of Chino Roces Avenue passing beneath the interchange's flyovers along EDSA is designated as one-way northbound, with a vertical clearance of 2.70 meters (8.9 ft). Southbound traffic for that section of Chino Roces is redirected to EDSA's at-grade service road.

== Feared collapse and rehabilitation efforts ==
The interchange was poorly designed as it had prior damages on the carriageway, particularly cracks and disintegration of concrete, guard rails, and steel expansion joints. Having been repaired in the 1980s, it was one of the most priority structures in Metro Manila that needed retrofitting.

In November 2010, several pipe leaks were discovered under the interchange, leading to the closure of its outer lanes by the Metropolitan Manila Development Authority due to fears of compromised structural integrity; it was reopened in 2011.

The strengthening works at the interchange were completed in 2017. The interchange's flyover is set for rehabilitation starting in October 2024.
