= Los Baños station =

Rail station in the Philippines

Los Baños

General information
- Location: Bambang
- Coordinates: 14°10′41″N 121°13′17″E
- Owner: Philippine National Railways
- Lines: South Main Line; Planned: South Commuter
- Platforms: Side platform
- Tracks: 1

Construction
- Structure type: At grade
- Accessible: Yes

Other information
- Station code: LS

History
- Opened: Initial: August 15, 1910; As part of MSC IRRI Extension: December 1, 2019; As part of IPC: October 6, 2022

Services
Preceding station	PNR	Following station
Masili towards Tutuban	Metro South Commuter	College towards IRRI
Masili towards Halang Dos	Inter-Provincial Commuter	College towards Lucena
Location
- Location within Laguna Location within Luzon Location within Philippines

Los Baños station is a railway station located on the South Main Line in Los Baños, Laguna, Philippines.

== History ==
=== American era ===
The station was built on August 15, 1910, to serve the town of Los Baños and was originally part of the Pagsanjan Branch Line of the Manila Railroad Company and of the South Main Line as soon as the cutoff line going to San Pablo was completed in 1923.

=== Present ===
In December 2019, the station become active once again as PNR extended the Metro South Commuter trips by adding five more stations on the present commuter line. KiHa 59 series and KiHa 35 trains ply the route, with the former servicing the entire route to Tutuban and the latter going to Alabang only. Services became disrupted again as soon as the lockdown caused by the COVID-19 pandemic took effect mid-March 2020. As of October 2021, the service is still inactive.

In January 2022, the steel stairs was dismantled by PNR Crew along with DEL 5007 to be repurposed for the upcoming Inter-Provincial Commuter Train Service between San Pablo City in the province of Laguna and Lucena City in the province of Quezon.

=== Inter-Provincial Commuter Calamba Extension ===
Philippine National Railways inaugurated the Calamba-Lucena Line on October 6, 2022 in addition to the current San Pablo-Lucena route of Inter-Provincial Commuter Line which runs between the provinces of Laguna and Quezon. The additional stops included in the extension are IRRI Flag stop, College, Los Baños, Masili, Pansol, and Calamba, which was also formerly served by the Metro South Commuter IRRI extension way back 2019.

== Future development ==
A new Los Baños station will be built further south of IRRI station at barangay Putho-Tuntungin under the PNR South Long Haul project, a reconstruction of the existing narrow-gauge rail line to standard gauge. It will consist of three tracks, with two passing siding for each of its platforms, and the middle track reserved for express trains bypassing the station.
