= Masili station =

Railway station in the Philippines

Masili

General information
- Location: Masili, Calamba
- Coordinates: 14°10′44″N 121°12′03″E
- Owner: Department of Transportation
- Operator: Philippine National Railways
- Lines: South Main Line; Planned: South Commuter
- Platforms: Stair
- Tracks: 1

Construction
- Structure type: at grade
- Accessible: Yes

Other information
- Station code: MSL

History
- Opened: December 1, 2019

Services
Preceding station	PNR	Following station
Pansol towards Tutuban	Metro South Commuter	Los Baños towards IRRI
Pansol towards Halang Dos	Inter-Provincial Commuter	Los Baños towards Lucena
Location
- Location within Laguna Location within Luzon Location within Philippines

Masili station is a railway station located on the South Main Line in Laguna, Philippines. It is a flag stop for the line as there are no platforms yet being erected, temporary stairs for the trains are added in the meantime to facilitate loading and unloading.

== History ==
Masili was built due to a petition of the residents of the then barangay Sumile to the Manila Railroad Company demanding for a station of their own on its Main Line South going to Legaspi. The company then erected a flag stop shelter in fulfillment of the resident's wishes.

The station was named as such because of a misspelling on the station board after the stop was built. Surprisingly, no one bothered to correct the mistake and the barangay was now referred to its current name as a consequence.

== Present ==
In December 2019, the station was used once again as PNR extended the Metro South Commuter trips by adding 5 more stations on the present commuter line, which terminates on IRRI station in Los Baños. KiHa 59 series and KiHa 35 trainsets ply the route, with the former servicing the entire route to Tutuban and the latter going up to Alabang only. Services become disrupted again as soon as the lockdown caused by the COVID-19 Pandemic takes effect mid-March 2020. As of November 2021, the service is still inactive.
