= Banlic station =

Railway station in Laguna, Philippines

Banlic
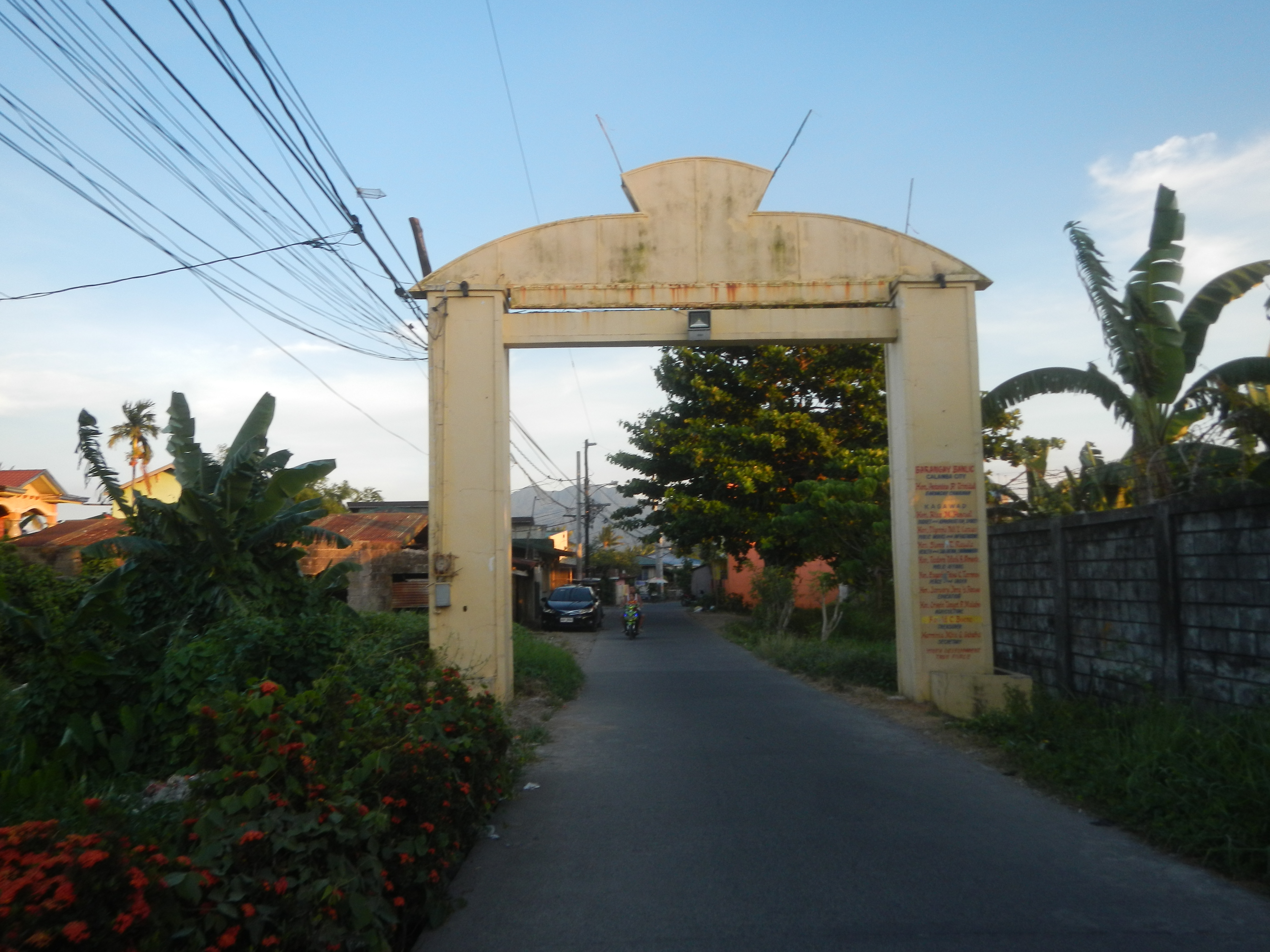
- Welcome arch of Barangay Banlic

General information
- Location: Banlic; Calamba, Laguna; Philippines
- Coordinates: 14°13′26″N 121°8′56″E
- Owner: Philippine National Railways
- Operator: Philippine National Railways
- Lines: South Main Line; Planned: South Commuter
- Platforms: 3 side, 1 island platform
- Tracks: 6

Construction
- Structure type: Elevated

History
- Opened: 2029 (planned)

Services
Preceding station	PNR	Following station
Gulod towards Clark International Airport	NSCR Commuter Clark Airport–Calamba	Calamba Terminus
Gulod towards Tutuban	NSCR Commuter Tutuban–Calamba	Calamba Terminus
Terminus	SLH Local	Bucal towards Daraga
Terminus	SLH Bicol Express (before 2030)	San Pablo towards Daraga
Terminus	SLH Bicol Express (before 2030)	San Pablo towards Matnog
Location
- Location within Laguna Location within Luzon Location within Philippines

Banlic station is an under-construction railway station located on the North–South Commuter Railway in Laguna, Philippines.

== Description ==
Banlic is one of the two interchange points between the North–South Commuter Railway (NSCR) and the PNR South Long Haul inter-city rail lines. It is currently set to be the terminus of South Long Haul Phase 1, while Sucat, the planned passenger terminus of the system, will only be built by Phase 4. Meanwhile, Calamba being the next station to the south, is a terminus of the NSCR as a whole. This makes Banlic the penultimate station for southbound NSCR trains heading for Calamba and northbound South Long Haul trains heading for Sucat. It will also replace Mamatid station for the NSCR, located a few hundred meters to the north.

The proposed station will feature six tracks, four from the South Long Haul and two from the NSCR. Four platforms have been allotted for the system with two side platforms for the NSCR, and one island and one side platform for the South Long Haul.

=== Other facilities ===
Also near the site is the Banlic rail yard, where NSCR South's trainsets will be stored.
