= Pansol station =

Railway station in Calamba, Philippines

Pansol

General information
- Location: Resurreccion Road, Pansol
- Coordinates: 14°10′43″N 121°11′02″E
- Owner: Department of Transportation
- Operator: Philippine National Railways
- Lines: South Main Line; Planned: South Commuter
- Platforms: Stair
- Tracks: 1

Construction
- Structure type: At grade

Other information
- Station code: OL

History
- Opened: c. 1910; December 1, 2019

Services
Preceding station	PNR	Following station
Calamba towards Tutuban	Metro South Commuter	Masili towards IRRI
Halang Dos Terminus	Inter-Provincial Commuter	Masili towards Lucena
Location
- Location within Laguna Location within Luzon Location within Philippines

Pansol station is a railway station located on the South Main Line in Calamba, Laguna, Philippines. The station once had a rail yard with four tracks. The single main line track had a long passing loop that contained another, shorter passing loop. It also contained a refuge which led to a ballast pit. The station is 60 km from Tutuban.

The station is considered abandoned until 2019; the platform is its only noticeable vestige. It is a flag stop for the line as there are no platforms yet being erected, temporary stairs for the trains are added in the meantime to facilitate loading and unloading.

== History ==
On December 1, 2019, the PNR extended their Metro South Commuter operations down to the front gate of the International Rice Research Institute (IRRI) in Los Baños, Laguna. The track was led by the only KiHa 59 trainset of the PNR with a new white-orange livery. Pansol was one of five reopened stops.
