= College station (PNR) =

Philippine National Railways station

College

General information
- Other names: Junction
- Location: J. Aquino Street, Mayondon
- Coordinates: 14°10′54″N 121°14′24″E
- Owner: Philippine National Railways
- Operator: Philippine National Railways
- Lines: South Main Line; Former: Santa Cruz
- Platforms: Side platform
- Tracks: 1 (formerly 2)
- Connections: Tricycles

Construction
- Structure type: at grade
- Accessible: Yes

Other information
- Station code: COL

History
- Opened: Initial: August 20, 1923; 103 years ago As part of MSC IRRI Extension: December 1, 2019; 6 years ago As part of IPC:October 6, 2022; 3 years ago
- Former names: Junction

Services
Preceding station	PNR	Following station
Los Baños towards Tutuban	Metro South Commuter	IRRI Terminus
Los Baños towards Halang Dos	Inter-Provincial Commuter	IRRI towards Lucena
Location
- Location within Laguna Location within Luzon Location within Philippines

College Station (also known as UP Los Baños station and Junction station) is a railway station located on the South Main Line in Los Baños, Laguna, Philippines.

== History ==
=== American era ===
The station was built in response to the Los Baños–San Pablo bypass line that aims to cut the travel time from Manila down to the South Main Line compared to the current route that passes through the province of Batangas. This in turn, made the Los Baños section of the Pagsanjan-Sta Cruz Branch line part of the PNR Main Line to Bicol. Now with two rail lines diverging from this station, it became known as the "Junction Station". Over time, it was eventually referred to its present name due to its proximity to the University of the Philippines College of Agriculture (now known as University of the Philippines Los Baños).

During its peak, the station become the terminus for the now defunct Pagsanjan Line and consisted of multiple tracks with side and island platforms.

The line was served by the Railmotors of Manila Railroad Company and usually have 5 trips per day.

In the year 1938 to 1939, the island platform and passenger shelters are constructed for the station. One notable structure was the pebbled pillars made by Filipino Architect and National Artist Pablo Antonio.

=== World War 2 ===
The station was subjected from air attacks when Imperial Japan have invaded the country after the attack on Pearl Harbor. On Christmas Day of 1941, a train on the station was bombed by the invading Japanese forces where 30 passengers have lost their lives. Structures were damaged and caused multiple loss of lives as well. It suffered further damage as the Americans returned to liberate the country and bombed the station as well.

=== Post-War ===
After the war, MRR rehabilitated the train lines coming from the station going to Lucena (68.02 km) and part of the Pagsanjan Line (28.38 km). The college-Pagsawitan section was restored on September 1, 1946, after repair works were done on bridges, buildings, and communication lines. The short spur of rail line from Pagsawitan to Pagsanjan was excluded as it was removed by the Japanese during the war. Meanwhile, the college-Lucena section of the Main Line South was also rehabilitated and placed back into operation on February 20, 1947. The first through traffic from Manila to Bicol since the liberation was finally inaugurated after completing repair works of tracks, buildings, structures, and most importantly, the repair of the Palicpic Bridge which was blasted during the war.

=== Contemporary era ===
Train service on the station have been repeatedly opened and closed for a variety of reasons such as natural disasters, lack of proper maintenance, and/or lack of rolling stock throughout its history.

==== Metro Manila Rail Commuter ====
Philippine National Railways initiated the Metro Manila Railway Commuter project on November 30, 1972, after the opening of the new Tutuban-San Pedro and Carmona route which was expanded later on up to College. The service uses the CMC Railcars plying the 67 km line, offering fast and cheap mode of transport in the province.

==== Metrotren ====
The 90's saw the launch of Metrotren Project, also known as Metrotrak, under the leadership of Transportation Secretary Oscar Orbos. It aims to increase ridership on the current commuter line, which serves Calumpit, Bulacan up to Los Baños Laguna, from its present level of 60,000 to about 140,000 daily than the current level. College was rehabilitated and Metrotren logos and markings decorated the station. As of November 2021, some of them are still visible in the station pillars and roof. The service used CMC Railcars refurbished with the new Metrotren Livery.

==== Commuter Express ====
On August 3, 2001, former President Gloria Macapagal Arroyo inaugurated the new Commuter Express (CommEx) service from Tutuban to College using donated 12 Series Passenger Coaches from Japan, which promised development and more opportunities for the Laguna Residents and the province as a whole.

Services was disrupted again five years later, as Typhoon Milenyo as it ravaged the rail line going to Bicol, primarily the San Cristobal Bridge on Calamba on September 28 with Typhoon Reming following two months later, which further damaged theine and destroying Travesia Bridge in Ligao-Guinobatan Section. The line would not be serviceable until 2010.

==== Metro South Commuter ====
In December 2019, the station become active once again as PNR extended the Metro South Commuter trips by adding 5 more stations on the present commuter line. KiHa 59 series and KiHa 35 trainsets ply the route, with the former servicing the entire route to Tutuban and the latter going up to Alabang only. Services become disrupted again as soon as the lockdown caused by the COVID-19 Pandemic takes effect mid-March 2020. As of October 2021, the service is still inactive.

=== Present ===
In the present day, the platform of College Station opposite the active line currently serves as a terminal for trikes serving the barangays of Batong Malake and Mayondon. Some residents occupy the area in and around the station building. The station's passing loop was also in a bad state with some parts of the tracks dismantled, if not being under a layer of soil but still recognizable.

The station was also used by PNR to some extent as it serves as stopover for passing work trains conducting clearing operations in and around Los Banos during the first quarter of the year 2022.

In January 2022, the steel stairs was dismantled by PNR Crew along with DEL 5007 to be repurposed for the upcoming Inter-Provincial Commuter Train Service between San Pablo City in the province of Laguna and Lucena City in the province of Quezon.

In May 2022, the station saw an increased presence of PNR employees along with security personnel. The station building, along with some of the shed are repainted and repaired. Old roofing and the ceiling was replaced with new ones. The interiors are still awaiting to be retrofitted even though there is already employees stationed inside. These progress hints for possible reopening of services in the near future. The commuter service still did not materialize as of August 2022, two months after the supposed opening of the Dela Rosa, Makati to Lucena City Line, with the allocated steel stairs now relegated to San Pablo-Lucena Line.

=== Inter-Provincial Commuter Calamba Extension ===
Philippine National Railways inaugurated the Calamba-Lucena Line on October 6, 2022 in addition to the current San Pablo-Lucena route of Inter-Provincial Commuter Line which runs between the provinces of Laguna and Quezon. The additional stops included in the extension are IRRI Flag stop, College, Los Baños, Masili, Pansol, and Calamba, which was also formerly served by the Metro South Commuter IRRI extension way back 2019.

The line utilizes the newest trainsets of PNR bought from PT INKA and will be consisting of only 2 trips daily, departing Lucena early in the morning and Calamba later in the evening.
