= Gulod station =

Railway station in Laguna, Philippines

Gulod

General information
- Location: Gulod; Cabuyao, Laguna; Philippines
- Coordinates: 14°15′21″N 121°08′10″E
- Owner: Philippine National Railways
- Operator: Philippine National Railways
- Lines: South Main Line; Planned: South Commuter
- Tracks: 2

Other information
- Station code: GU

Services
Preceding station	PNR	Following station
Cabuyao towards Tutuban	Metro South Commuter	Mamatid towards IRRI
Location

Gulod station is a proposed railway station located on the South Main Line in Laguna, Philippines. It is planned to be situated in between the existing Cabuyao and Mamatid stations. This PNR station is proposed by the JICA for both the current Metro Commuter and the South Line of the North-South Commuter Rail Project.
