= San Pablo station (PNR) =

San Pablo
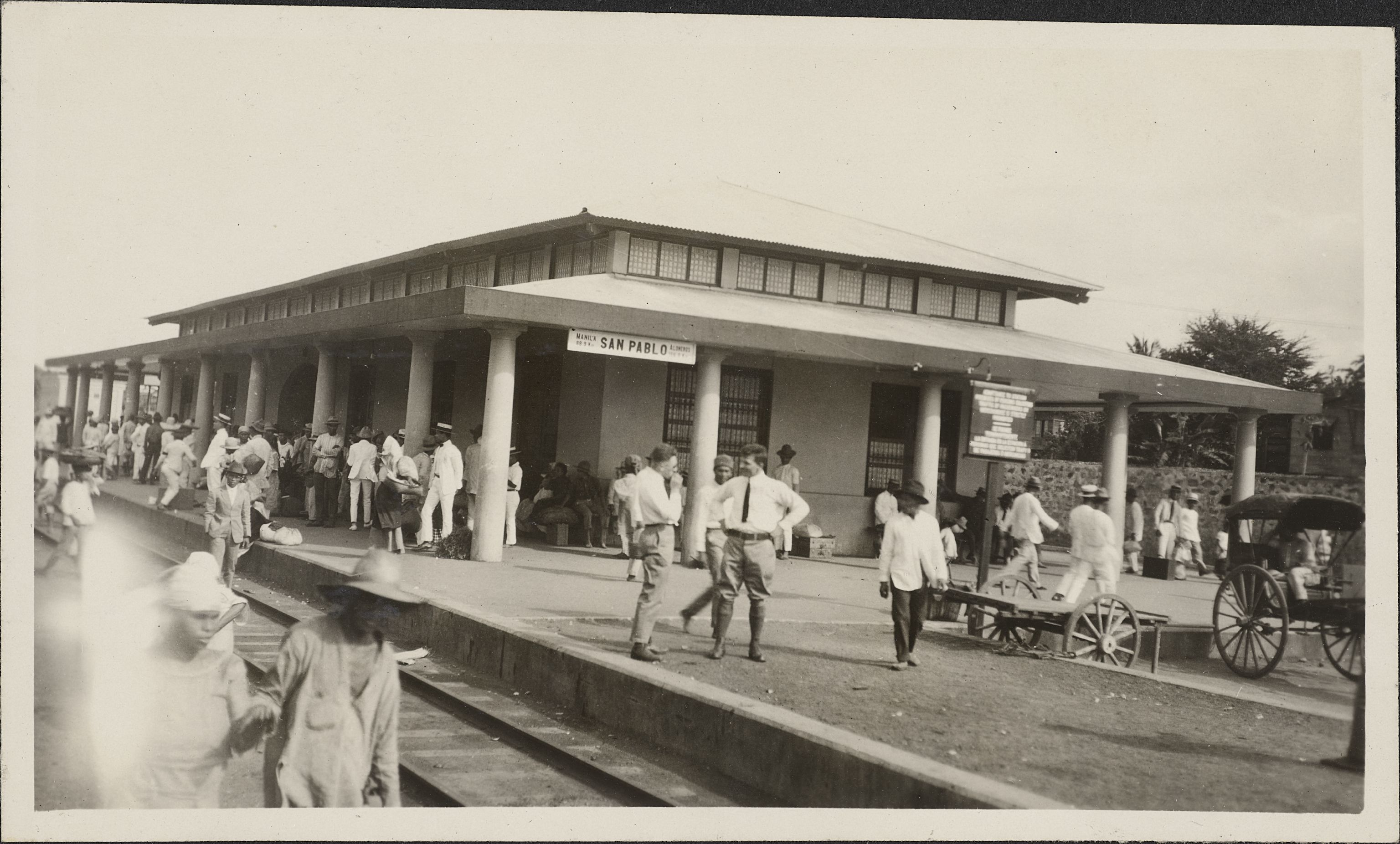
- San Pablo station in 1923

General information
- Location: Pedro Alcantara, Barangay II
- Coordinates: 14°4′7.32″N 121°19′16.32″E
- Owner: Philippine National Railways
- Operator: Philippine National Railways
- Lines: South Main Line; Former: Malvar
- Platforms: Side platform
- Tracks: 1, plus 1 siding track

Construction
- Structure type: At grade
- Accessible: Yes

Other information
- Station code: PBO

History
- Opened: July 3, 1911; 115 years ago

Services
Preceding station	PNR	Following station
Calamba towards Tutuban	Bicol Express	Lucena towards Legazpi
Calamba towards Tutuban	Isarog Limited	Lucena towards Naga
IRRI towards Halang Dos	Inter-Provincial Commuter	Tiaong (Lalig) towards Lucena
Location
- Location within Laguna Location within Luzon Location within Philippines

San Pablo station is a railway station located on the South Main Line in San Pablo, Laguna, Philippines.

== History ==
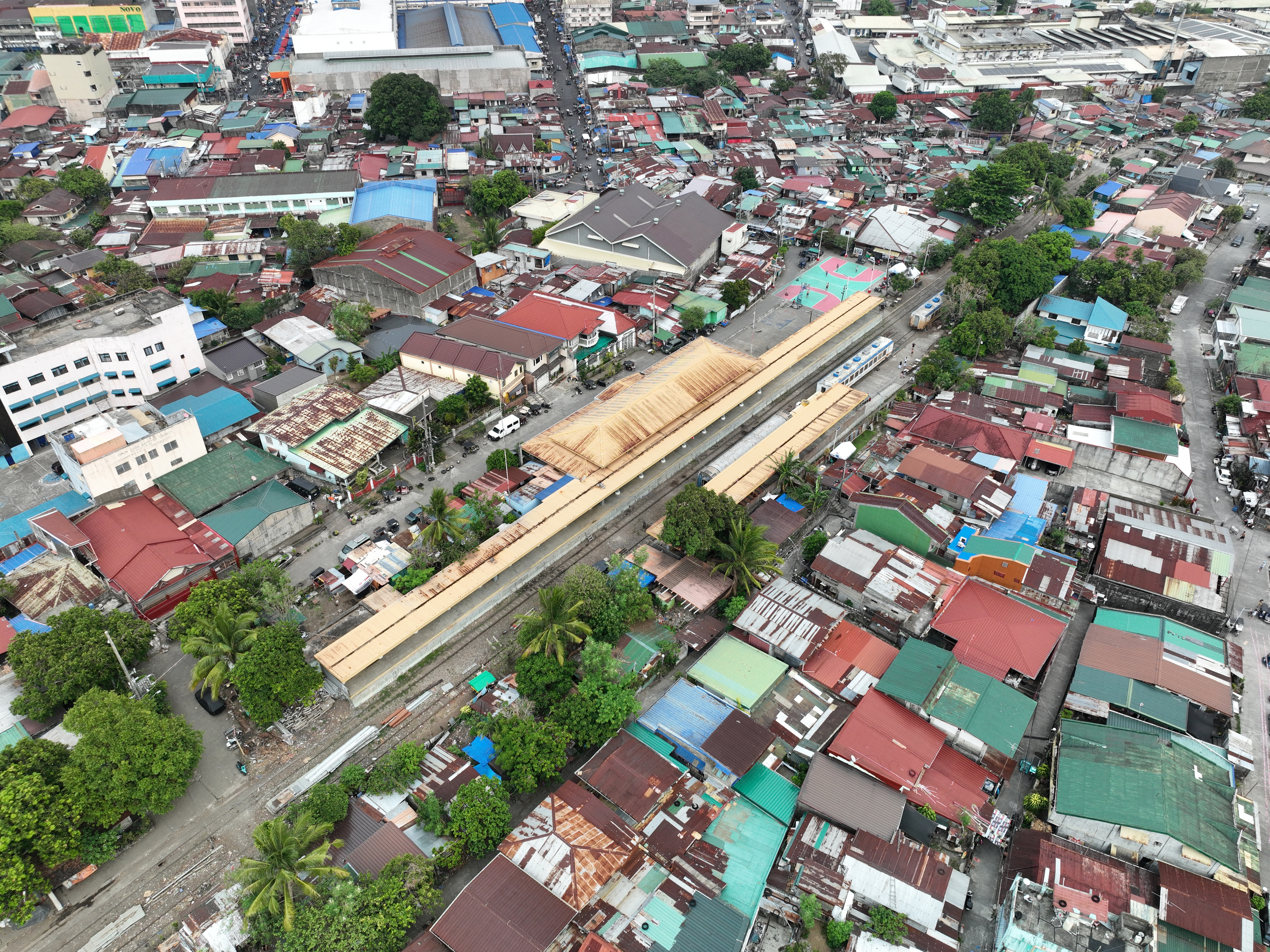
Drone shot of San Pablo station in 2026

San Pablo was opened on July 3, 1911, alongside the new section of South Main Line between Malvar, Batangas, and San Pablo, Laguna, as the line's terminus. It then became an intermediate station when the South Main Line was extended to the south towards Tiaong, Tayabas, (now Quezon) in July 1912. A bypass line to College station was completed on August 20, 1923.

Currently, San Pablo station is serviced twice a day by the South Main Line for the Lucena–Calamba inter-city rail line.

== Nearby landmarks ==
Being at the city center, San Pablo station is in the vicinity of the city market area of San Pablo, close to various commercial and educational establishments. Major landmarks nearby include the San Pablo City Shopping Mall, the Saint Paul the First Hermit Cathedral, Puregold Extra, Unimart Mall, San Pablo Colleges, and Liceo de San Pablo. Further landmarks from the station include the San Pablo Heritage zone, the city public transport terminal, and Sampaloc Lake.

== Transportation links ==
San Pablo station is readily served by tricycles plying routes within the San Pablo market area. Farther away are jeeps circling the city and serving nearby towns like Calauan and Alaminos. The station is also close to Maharlika Highway, a major thoroughfare for buses when traveling to Quezon.

The station is proposed to be a major stop in the South Lang Haul project, connecting San Pablo with Metro Manila and Bicol.
