= IRRI station =

Philippine railway stop

IRRI

General information
- Location: Pili Drive, Maahas
- Coordinates: 14°10′04″N 121°15′15″E
- Owner: Philippine National Railways
- Operator: Philippine National Railways
- Lines: South Main Line; Planned: South Commuter
- Platforms: Stair
- Tracks: 1

Construction
- Structure type: At grade

Other information
- Station code: IRRI

History
- Opened: December 1, 2019

Services
Preceding station	PNR	Following station
College towards Tutuban	Metro South Commuter (Flag Stop)	Terminus
College towards Halang Dos	Inter-Provincial Commuter	San Pablo towards Lucena
Future services
Preceding station	PNR	Following station
Bucal towards Tutuban	Bicol Express (As Los Baños)	San Pablo towards Legazpi
Location
- Location within Laguna Location within Luzon Location within Philippines

IRRI station is a railway station located on the South Main Line in Los Baños, Laguna, Philippines. It is a flag stop for the line as there are no platforms yet being erected, with temporary stairs for the trains being added in the meantime to facilitate loading and unloading.

== History ==
In December 2019, the flag stop was opened as PNR extended the Metro South Commuter trips by adding 5 more stations on the present commuter line. KiHa 59 series and KiHa 35 trainsets ply the route, with the former servicing the entire route to Tutuban and the latter going up to Alabang only. The station served as the southern terminus of the newly opened line.

Services were disrupted as soon as the lockdown caused by the COVID-19 pandemic took effect in mid-March 2020. As of October 2021, the service is still inactive. A passing loop was planned for possible use of locomotives in the station but only the switch was laid. This plan was not realized as of October 2021.

In January 2022, the railway switch and the steel stairs were dismantled by the PNR Crew along with DEL 5007 to be repurposed for the upcoming Inter-Provincial Commuter Train Service between San Pablo City in the province of Laguna and Lucena City in the province of Quezon. Only some dismantled rail pieces and railfrogs remain scattered in the area of the flagstop. On May 25, 2022, an inspection train hailing from Dela Rosa Station travelled to IRRI Flagstop with officials onboard to conduct certification of the railway from Manila to Los Banos for possible reopening of commuter services along with the San Pablo-Lucena Commuter Line. The trainset used consist of DHL-9003, PC 8303, with DEL 5007 at the end serving as a back engine. As of July 2022, only the line connecting Laguna and Quezon Province has been realized while the Dela Rosa-IRRI-San Pablo is still pending due to lack of available trains.

=== Inter-Provincial Commuter Calamba Extension ===
Philippine National Railways inaugurated the Calamba-Lucena Line on October 6, 2022, in addition to the current San Pablo-Lucena route of the Inter-Provincial Commuter Line which runs between the provinces of Laguna and Quezon. The additional stops included in the extension are IRRI Flag stop, College, Los Baños, Masili, Pansol, and Calamba, which was also formerly served by the Metro South Commuter IRRI extension in 2019.

== Future ==
A new Los Baños station will be built further south of IRRI station at Brgy. Putho-Tuntungin under the PNR South Long Haul project, a reconstruction of the existing narrow-gauge rail line to standard gauge. It will be composed of three tracks, with two passing siding for each of its platforms, and the middle track reserved for express trains skipping the station.
