= PNR South Long Haul =

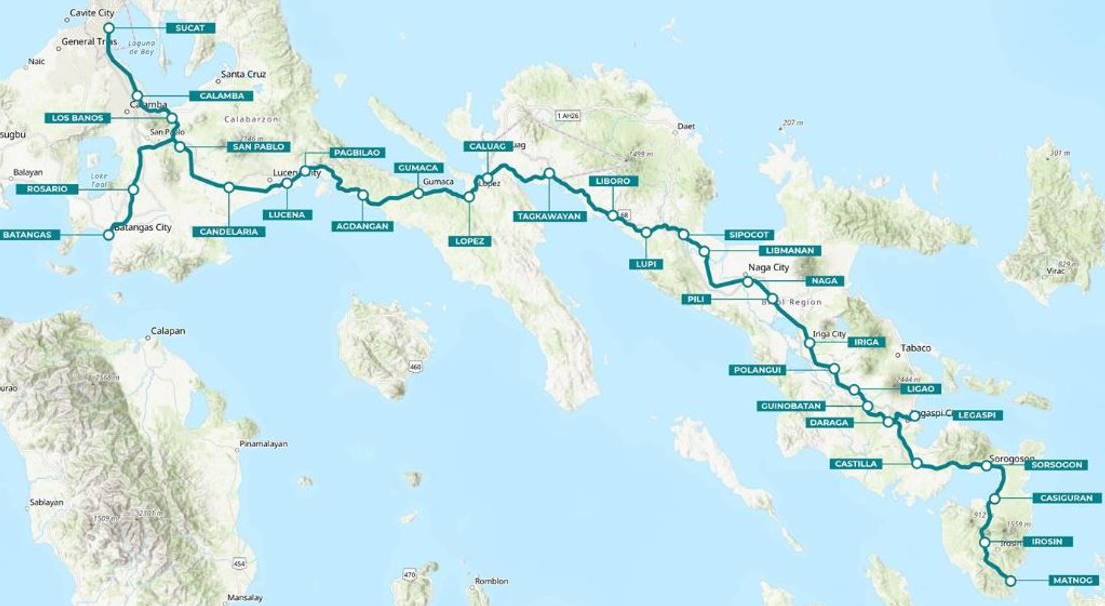
- The South Long Haul project map as of April 2021.

Overview
- Status: Approved
- Owner: Department of Transportation
- Locale: South Luzon
- Termini: Sucat; Matnog
- Continues from: North–South Commuter Railway
- Stations: 35

Service
- Type: Inter-city rail Higher-speed rail Freight rail
- Services: 3
- Operator: Philippine National Railways
- Depot(s): San Pablo, Tagkawayan and Daraga
- Daily ridership: 100,000

History
- Opened: 1916 (PNR South Main Line)
- Closed: 2014

Technical
- Line length: 565 km (351 mi) (Note: Total line length, including Phases 2 to 4 but not the Port of Manila extension and Daet branch.)
- Track length: 565 km (351 mi)
- Number of tracks: Single-track (Note: With passing sidings at stations and future allowances for double-track.)
- Character: Grade-separated (Note: With tunnelled sections in Quezon and Camarines Sur and elevated viaduct sections in Laguna); 5.05 m (16 ft 7 in) minimum clearance
- Track gauge: 1,435 mm (4 ft 8 1/2 in) standard gauge
- Old gauge: 1,067 mm (3 ft 6 in) narrow gauge (Note: Planned for the extension towards the Port of Manila.)
- Minimum radius: 400 m (1,300 ft) (critical); 1,200 m (3,900 ft) (standard radius at 120 km/h)
- Electrification: None
- Operating speed: Passenger: 160 km/h (100 mph); Freight: 80–100 km/h (50–60 mph)
- Signalling: ETCS Level 1; CSM-KA
- Highest elevation: 150 m (490 ft) near Ilawod–Comun Road, Camalig, Albay
- Maximum incline: 20‰
- Average inter-station distance: 17.24 km (10.71 mi)

The PNR South Long Haul, also known as the PNR Bicol, is a proposed inter-city rail line project in southern Luzon, Philippines. It is part of the larger Luzon Rail System, a network of long-distance standard-gauge lines being built by the Philippine National Railways (PNR) throughout Luzon. It is one of the two lines to reconstruct the historic PNR South Main Line, along with the electrified North–South Commuter Railway South section to Calamba, Laguna.

The line will initially begin at Banlic station in Calamba, Laguna and terminate at Daraga, Albay. It would have also plan an additional extensions, infill stations, and branch lines. The masterplan line shall connect passengers from Sucat station in Muntinlupa to either the Batangas International Port, Legazpi, Albay, or Matnog, Sorsogon. Freight trains will also serve the line and there will be an eventual extension of the line to the Port of Manila.

The project was estimated to cost ₱175 billion (US$3.45 billion) and financing for the line was originally supposed to be supported by Chinese official development assistance, which was later withdrawn in 2023. Construction for the line has been postponed for various reasons. The line was to be partially operable between San Pablo and Lucena by 2025, and the first phase between Banlic and Daraga would be fully opened by 2027. After China's withdrawal of loans, the government is still waiting to find new sources of financing and have discussions with other countries. As of 2025, pre-construction work is still in progress.

== History ==
=== Background ===
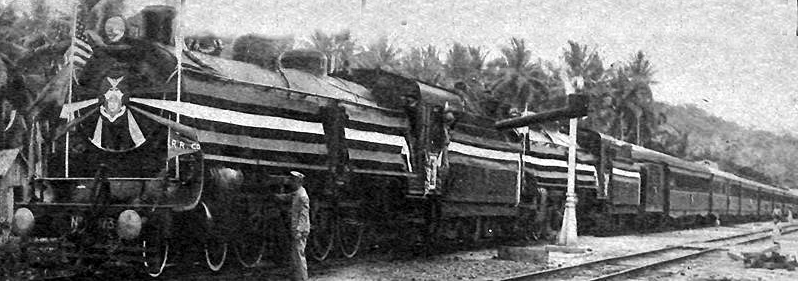
The Manila Railroad celebrated the first Manila–Legazpi Bicol Express on May 8, 1938.

The South Main Line was first proposed in 1875 as part of the plan for the Luzon railway network. The line was first opened as the Main Line South in 1916 and its first named service was the Lucena Express to Lucena, Quezon. The Bicol Express opened three years later in 1919. Several more segments were constructed into Quezon province and the Bicol Region, including a new line called the Legazpi Division. The two sections were then connected by a train ferry until the completion of the line in 1938. On May 8, 1938, the two sections were officially linked with President Manuel L. Quezon hammering the golden spike at Del Gallego, Camarines Sur.

Around those same years, the first standard-gauge railway in the Philippines was opened in Camarines Norte by the Dahican Lumber Company. The company used three geared steam locomotives acquired second-hand from the United States. Therefore, this was not under the Manila Railroad network which ran on narrow gauge which is still in intermittent use today.

During its peak in 1941, the line also had branches in Batangas as the Batangas City line and eastern Laguna province as the Pagsanjan line. The line was also known to carry mixed trains as late as 1968, when PNR operated a short-lived refrigerated car service carrying produce with the 1968 eruption of the Mayon Volcano being the cause of its cancellation. According to the PNR, post-war services peaked between the late 1960s and the early 1970s, and the South Main Line enjoyed a daily ridership of 7,560 passengers being carried by 36 passenger railcars.

Ridership eventually declined as buses became the favored transit mode out of Metro Manila. The new Maharlika Highway system was being built around the country starting in the 1970s which accelerated the demise of rail travel. Its northern counterpart was closed in 1997, and the South Main Line continued to operate as the sole inter-city rail line in the Philippines. After a derailment in Padre Burgos, Quezon in 2004 made the Philippine National Railways to cancel all intercity services until 2011, when both the Bicol Express to Legazpi and the Isarog Limited to Naga returned to service. The services were short-lived and were terminated again the following year after a derailment in nearby Sariaya, and services were intermittent since then. The Aquino administration purchased rail ties to rehabilitate the rails in the area of Hondagua station in 2015 as part of the first South Main Line rebuild, but the ties were left to rot on the yards of a train station in Muntinlupa by 2019.

During the enhanced community quarantine in Luzon, the South Main Line was used to carry so-called locally-stranded individuals or people stranded outside their hometown during the lockdowns. They were sent home on express trains to the Bicol Region under the Balik Probinsya, Bagong Pag-asa (lit. Return to the Country Side, New Hope) program.

=== Development ===
The first mention of an extension of the South Main Line to Sorsogon province in contemporary times was in 1996 when the Japan International Cooperation Agency mentioned an extension of the line to Matnog. An earlier extension to Sorsogon however was mentioned as early as 1962 as part of the Cagayan Valley Railroad Extension Project for the PNR North Main Line, and then made into law as part of Republic Act 6366 enacted by Ferdinand Marcos on August 16, 1971.

By 2015, a proposal was presented to PNR and will be built as-is. The narrow gauge line would have had a maximum speed of 75 km/h (47 mph). The 2015 plan would have been bundled with the initial 2015 North–South Commuter Railway plan and would be funded as a public-private partnership as part of the North-South Railway Project. However, the auction was called off in November 2016.

==== Under Chinese proposal ====
Another proposal was approved on September 12, 2017, as a standard-gauge line. The new standard-gauge line was announced in 2018 and would have had a maximum speed of 120 km/h (75 mph). In 2019, the line is announced to have a maximum speed of 160 km/h (100 mph) and the new Bicol Express train will have an average speed of 107 km/h (66 mph). The line was initially set to fully open by 2026.

In December 2019, PNR ordered 3 diesel multiple unit trainsets from CRRC Zhuzhou Locomotive, expandable to 21. The order was cancelled in February 2021 due to the latter's failure to submit post-bid documents.

It was later mentioned on September 2, 2021, that the unused sections of the old PNR South Main Line will be reconstructed as branch lines and/or feeder lines to the South Long Haul line.

The bidding for the design and build contract for the project was opened in June 2021. In November 2021, the joint venture of China Railway Group Limited, China Railway No. 3 Engineering Group Co., Ltd, and China Railway Engineering Consulting Group Co., Ltd. (CREC JV) qualified for the contract and was subsequently awarded the contract on December 2, 2021. The contract was signed by the Department of Transportation and the CREC joint venture on January 17, 2022.

In July 2022, the project funding by China for the project was withdrawn after the Chinese government failed to act on the funding requests by the Duterte administration, along with the funding for the Subic–Clark Railway (later Subic–Clark–Manila–Batangas Railway under a new initiative) and Mindanao Railway projects. Negotiations were restarted in August after Chinese Ambassador to the Philippines Huang Xilian and Transport Secretary Jaime Bautista held formal talks ending in an agreement to restart negotiations for the three railway projects. However, negotiations between the two countries broke down, prompting the withdrawal of its loan application on November 6, 2023. Bautista also says that Beijing has lost interest, but this is not linked to South China Sea tensions.

According to a report earlier in July before China's withdrawal, the extension of the expressway in the Bicol region is economically viable. Also, some of the projects, including this railway, are not viable and feasible.

==== Attempts on finding funders ====
After China's withdrawal, other funders have discussed financing the project, but no further details have been revealed. The causes of the project's delay include affected informal settlers, a lack of construction and funding, and the relocation of families, which began in October 2023.

According to international relations and security expert Lucio Pitlo III, saying “under the present state of bilateral ties, it’s really hard to see progress on such financing so looking for alternative sources makes sense.”

In November 2023, DOTr Secretary Jaime Bautista announced that India, Japan, and South Korea have offered to finance the three railway projects, including the PNR South Long Haul. On March 12, 2024, the Asian Development Bank (ADB), a lender that also provided the funding for the two sections of the North–South Commuter Railway (NSCR), was in talks with National Economic and Development Authority to finance the project. In the following month, Bicol Saro party-list Rep. Brian Raymund Yamsuan announced that Japan would be viable to fund the project.

In July of that year, it was revealed that it may likely end up borrowing from the ADB and Asian Infrastructure Investment Bank (AIIB) to rebuild the Bicol Express through the SLH. In August, NEDA Secretary Arsenio Balisacan said it could be that the World Bank, ADB, Japan, India, and Korea have offered the project.

In January 2025, however, according to an interview on Ted Failon at DJ Chacha sa True FM, Jeremy Regino, the DOTr undersecretary for railways, said the project could not have funding yet. He said the DOTr failed to secure enough funding in the 2025 General Appropriations Act (GAA) to undertake the preparatory works for the project, making it challenging to acquire the right of way. France also offered the project in April.

According to The Philippine Star, a report to DOTr Secretary Vince Dizon: “Yes, these projects remain in the priority list of the President and in the priority list of the DOTr. However, it is difficult to say if we don’t have the funding yet. We cannot program a timeline for them,”. Following Dizon's appointment by the Commission of Appointments (COA), Luis Raymund Villafuerte, the representative for Camarines Sur's 2nd district, disclosed that the project has transformed into a high-speed rail system, akin to Japan's Shinkansen, shifting from an ordinary train system.

In August, it was announced that funding from the United States for specific parts of the railway was proposed, and while the amount fell short, it could potentially provide additional resources to move families.

A year later, the PNR pitched the project to American investors during the US–Philippines Rail Technology Exchange. Prior to this, the PNR had also held discussions with the commercial team of the United States Embassy to gauge interest, as well as Taiwanese private companies exploring a public-private partnership (PPP) model that would bundle rail development with land-use rights.

To maintain the project's viability and prevent encroachment, the PNR opened bidding in July 2026 for a ₱19.64 million right of way fencing contract covering the San Pablo, Laguna segment. The 190-day fencing project was designed as a proactive measure to protect the cleared alignment from informal settlers, trespassing, and vandalism while permanent construction funding was being finalized. In September 2026, the project does not allocated through 2027 national budget.

Despite several setbacks, the government is pressing forward with its infrastructure agenda, notably the ₱16 billion (US$264 million) rehabilitation of the Maharlika Highway. This initiative was announced by Secretary of Public Works and Highways Vince Dizon, who previously served as the DOTr head. The project is currently slated for completion in 2027.

=== Other plans ===
In April 2024, the government announced the Luzon Economic Corridor, a plan to link the ports in Subic, Clark, Manila, and Batangas and build an industrial area free of slow traffic and powered by renewable energy, positioned to rival the capital in economic output, and a freight railway that will connect the four ports, further postponing the development of the South Long Haul, and a spur linking to Batangas province is now absorbed by the new railway. It is a planned 280-kilometer (170-mile) link that would serve Central Luzon, Metro Manila, and Calabarzon.

== Construction ==
Prior to the withdrawal of funds from Chinese assistance in 2023, construction had yet to start. On March 3, 2021, AECOM Philippines requested the local governments that occupy the project's right-of-way to provide information for their environmental impact assessment which will be conducted between March and June 2021. On April 21, the Presidential Commission for the Urban Poor-Luzon along with the Department of Transportation and local governments held a conference regarding the identification of affected private property and resettlement of households whose houses are located on the right-of-way of the line. On May 7, the Philippine Railways Institute published the latest map for the project that was initially approved by the Department of Transportation on March 31. This changed the separation point of the Batangas branch line from Tiaong, Quezon to somewhere between Calauan and Bay, Laguna.

=== Phases ===
Construction will be divided into five phases:

- Phase 1 is the reconstruction of the bulk of the old South Main Line. It will be between Banlic in Calamba, Laguna and Daraga in Daraga, Albay. It will have 23 stations and the total line length will be between 380.4 km (236.4 mi). The line's main railyard and maintenance depot will be located near San Pablo station in Laguna, while according to ArcGIS, smaller railyards will be built in Tagkawayan and Daraga. Construction is expected by May 2021 and completion is set by the second quarter of 2022.
- Phase 2 will be the expansion of Phase 1 to Legazpi, Albay and Matnog, Sorsogon. Legazpi station will be served by a dedicated branch line from the new Daraga station located outside the town center, while the new main line will have 5 stations ending in Matnog. The combined length of the lines will be 117 kilometers (73 miles).
- Phase 3 will be the reconstruction of the Batangas branch which was deactivated before 1986. A new right of way will be used since the old line was planned for the NSCR South Phase 2 to Batangas City. As of June 4, 2021, the branch will separate from the mainline at San Pablo station, where the line will become double-track until the branch leads to the direction of Batangas. It will pass through the towns of San Antonio in Quezon Province, Rosario and Ibaan in Batangas Province, before terminating at the Batangas International Port with at least 5 stations and a length of 44.8 kilometers (27.8 miles).
- Phase 4 will be from Sucat to Banlic. There will be no intermediate stations and will have a total length of 38 kilometers (24 miles). This will also see the construction of Bucal infill station in Calamba.
- A future reconstruction of the PNR Metro Commuter Line's South section between Tutuban and Sucat will happen after the construction of the NSCR South. It will have a total length of 25 kilometers (16 miles). Although passenger services shall terminate at Sucat, freight services shall be extended to Tutuban. This is particularly due to the planned freight services between the Port of Manila and the Batangas International Port to be served by the Batangas branch line.
- An extension to Daet, Camarines Norte is also considered. Trains will travel southeast towards the direction of Matnog. Its length is yet to be determined since it is not part of the present South Long haul proposal.
- As stated earlier, some portions of the old South Main Line will be reconstructed as branch lines. The extent of the reconstruction remains unknown.

The completed line will be around 565 kilometers (351 mi) long not including the Tutuban–Sucat reconstruction of the Metro Commuter Line for freight trains and the Daet branch line and proposed reconstructed areas of the old Southrail line.

== Services ==
The first proposal in 2018 mentioned that the South Long Haul would have four types of services: a limited express service to be known as the Bicol Express, a regional express service between Quezon and the Bicol Region, regular commuter services, and freight services. This also coincided with an announcement that PNR's ex-JNR stock will be transferred to the Bicol Region after all its existing trainsets have been refurbished, leaving only INKA and Rotem stock on the PNR Metro Commuter Line. This has since been revised, though details were not published until June 30, 2021, when China Railway Design Corporation made its Basic Design Report public.

=== Passenger services ===
The 2021 CRDC report further detailed the kind of services that will be used on the line including its frequencies and termini. It is expected by 2022 that there will be 9 trains per day, increasing to 12 by 2025, 18 by 2030 and 25 by 2040. Passenger trains shall operate between 5:00 AM and 12:00 midnight Philippine Standard Time, and the last trains of the day are expected to depart from their termini by 6 PM. The following are the categories of passenger services allotted for the line:

- Express trains — The sixth Bicol Express (Note: First opened to Quezon in 1916, then to Albay in 1938, then reopened in 1949, 1998 and 2011.) will be the flagship service on the line. It initially starts at Banlic and stops at very few stations, being San Pablo, Lucena, Naga and Daraga. Once the system is complete, the service will begin at Sucat and will add Sorsogon in Sorsogon City and Matnog. However, Banlic will be closed and only local trains will stop there.
  - A proposed Quezon–Bicol Regional Express was mentioned in the 2018 report that would have made the Bicol Express a limited express service. However, this was removed from the 2021 Basic Design Report.
- Local trains — There will be regional rail services that will stop at all stations along the line. It will be subdivided into two types:
  - Long-distance trains — For Phase 1, these services will be end-to-end from Banlic to Daraga. By Phase 2 [sic], which CRDC defines to the completion of Phases 2 to 4 by 2030, there will be long-distance services from Sucat to Daraga and Matnog.
  - Short-distance trains — For Phase 1, there will be a service from Banlic to Lucena, replacing the now-defunct service between Tutuban and Lucena in the 1970s. Once the system has been finished, there will be services from Sucat to Lucena and to Batangas City.

=== Freight services ===
The new South Main Line aims to connect major seaport cities in southern Luzon, and freight trains are also expected to serve the new South Main Line. It will have a maximum speed of 100 km/h (62 mph). Three known freight services have been identified:

1. A service from the Manila International Container Terminal to a facility owned by International Container Terminal Services (ICTSI) in Calamba, Laguna was originally proposed in 2016 by both ICTSI and Meralco subsidiary MRail, which also supervised the maintenance of the PNR 900 class. The proposed service also hoped for the operation of 180 freight cars and six locomotives. Negotiations between PNR and the two private operators as late as 2019 but no plans have been implemented as of 2021.
2. A service to and from the Batangas International Port will also be included as part of the proposal. Originally proposed to decongest the highways leading to Manila, it has been confirmed that the PNR will reintroduce freight services on the branch line by February 2021. The PNR is conducting cost reassessment with the National Economic and Development Authority, environmental impact studies and land surveys as of March 2021.
3. A service between San Pablo and Daraga has also been allotted for Phase 1. Due to a relatively low amount of traffic in the area, such services on the line will be initially restricted to one freight train per day and to be eventually increased. Once the line achieves its designed passenger capacity in the long-term, freight trains shall only be allowed to travel during the nighttime.

== Design ==
The new South Main Line will be generally built at-grade as with the defunct but still extant Manila–Legazpi line. Unlike the old line however, there will be no level crossings in favor of full grade-separation with 397 of such interchanges between Alabang and Legazpi stations will be eliminated as a result.

For Phase 1 alone, 652 crossing points have been identified and all of these will either be bridges or underpasses. Two hundred thirty bridges and viaducts shall comprise a total length of 51.3 km (31.9 mi) or 12.94% of the proposed right-of-way. Embankments will take a majority of the right-of-way of up to 332 km (206 mi), except where cuttings will be constructed or along stations. The right-of-way is 30–40 meters (98–131 feet) wide, which would allow for double-tracking as well as future catenaries on embankment zones. Aside from the 230 bridges, there will also be 10 passenger tunnels and the San Pablo depot will be 70 ha (170 acres) in size.

The line shall be equipped with the European Rail Traffic Management System and ETCS Level 1 will be adopted on the line. Additionally, there will be two different rail types on the South Long Haul with 60 kilograms per meter (40 pounds per foot) rails for the mainline and 50 kilograms per meter (34 pounds per foot) rails for the passing sidings.

=== Rolling stock ===
==== Passenger stock ====
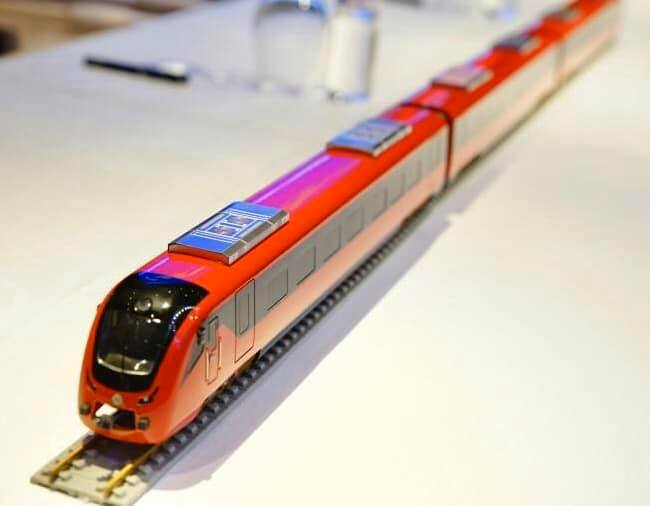
A scale model of the 3-car design for express train services prior to 2022.

As of June 2021, CRRC would have provided two classes of diesel multiple units for the passenger services. One will be a 3-car trainset while the other will be an 8-car trainset. A total of 81 railcars were expected to be ordered for the line's full operations by 2027. Both the 3-car and 8-car designs are capable of reaching 160 km/h (100 mph).

The three-car trainset design was planned to be used for the upcoming Bicol Express service. It was once again submitted for bidding by CRRC Zhuzhou Locomotive on June 11, 2021. This happened four months after the PNR cancelled this order due to lack of post-bidding documents. Three trainsets will be ordered for a total of 9 railcars, down from 21 trainsets or 63 railcars. These trainsets can accommodate 168 passengers each, and would feature a class arrangement similar to China Railway and the Railjet service of Austria; 36 seats for business class, 50 for first class, and 80 for second class. As of October 2022, the three trainsets are still undergoing factory acceptance testing. There are plans to either convert the trains to narrow gauge from standard gauge or suspend production of the trains.

Meanwhile, the use of an eight-car trainset was announced by the PNR through a press conference with Legazpi City mayor Noel Rosal on March 5, 2021. This happened after the cancellation of the 3-car trainsets in January. Sixty-four railcars were initially set for order, to be arranged into 8 trainsets.

By June 30, CRDC made its basic design report public and specified that the 8-car trainsets will be used for both long and short-distance local train services. The trainsets will be arranged in a Tc–M–M–T–T–M–M–Tc layout and will have a seating capacity of 650 passengers. In the same report, CRDC increased the allotted passenger trainsets for the line to 9 trainsets or 72 railcars. However, only 7 trainsets will be active while the remaining two will be kept in San Pablo for maintenance or for emergencies. For reference, the report used an image of the MŽ series 711, based on the MŽ series 411 electric multiple units. These trainsets were also built by CRRC Zhuzhou Locomotive for the Makedonski Železnici.

On January 18, 2022, Chinese Ambassador Huang Xilian's Facebook page unveiled the second iteration of the diesel multiple units. The new passenger stock is based on the KTM Class 61 meter-gauge DMUs built for the Malaysian Keretapi Tanah Melayu adopted to standard-gauge track.

A 3-car express DMU was featured as part of CRRC Zhuzhou's 2022 Science and Technology Culture Festival, part of the China Association of Science and Technology's annual Rail Transportation Technology and Innovation Conference in Zhuzhou, China.

=== Freight stock ===
China Railway's HXN series diesel locomotives has been proposed for the line's freight services according to the June 2021 report. An image of the FXN3C Fuxing locomotive was used for reference. It is a dual-ended cab forward design based on the China Railway HXN3, although the actual units may vary. Four units will be ordered with 3 units in active service while one will be stored for maintenance or emergency use. The maximum design speed for these locomotives would be at 120 km/h (75 mph). Accompanying them are 43 freight cars which will be either boxcars or flatcars. 36 units will be active while 7 units will be stored for the same purposes as the locomotives. Two internal combustion shunting machines were also allotted, and are distinct from switcher locomotives. Both units are expected to be in active service.

==== Types and specifications ====
Rolling stock types and specifications
	Local train	Express train	Freight train		
Name	TBD	TBD	HXN locomotive	P7D boxcar	NX7D flatcar
Year	2022–25			TBD	
Manufacturer	CRRC	CRRC Zhuzhou Locomotive	CRRC		
Units to be built	72 cars	9 cars	4 locomotives	43 cars total	
Cars per train	8	3	Not applicable	12 to 36	
Length	202 m (663 ft)	TBD	23 m (75 ft 6 in)	17.07 m (56 ft 0 in)	13.93 m (45 ft 8 in)
Width	3.3 m (10 ft 10 in)				3.18 m (10 ft 5 in)
Height	4.2 m (13 ft 9 in)		TBD		
Empty weight	TBD		150 t (330,000 lb)	24.6 t (54,000 lb)	23.8 t (52,000 lb)
Capacity	650 passengers	168 passengers: 38 business class; 52 first class; 80 second class	2 drivers	70 t (150,000 lb)	70 t (150,000 lb), or Two 20 ft. or one 40 ft. container
Doors	TBD	4	4	2	Not applicable
Traction power	Diesel-electric			Unpowered	
Power output	Four 735 kW (986 hp)	TBD	3,500 kW (4,700 hp)	Unpowered	
Coupling	Scharfenberg Type 10		Type H Tightlock		
Top speed	160 km/h (100 mph)		120 km/h (75 mph)	100 km/h (62 mph)	
Status	To be ordered	Ongoing second round bidding	To be ordered		

=== Electrification ===
The line shall be initially built for diesel trains, though allowances have been made for electrification as of June 2021. Documents published in 2018 also stated a specialized structure gauge of 5.7 by 3.8 meters (18 feet 8 inches by 12 feet 6 inches) will be used for tunnels and overpasses. This shall allow the placement of overhead lines. There were also much earlier plans in 2014 to electrify the proposed Batangas branch line once the North–South Commuter Railway's southward extension (NSCR South Phase 2) has been approved. However, a later document stated that the NSCR South and South Long Haul will not share the same tracks. The existing Metro South Commuter right-of-way shall be rebuilt for the NSCR and the South Long Haul tracks will be built up to 10 meters (33 feet) off the present main line.

The electrification system is yet to be determined. This is due to the differences between Chinese (25 kV AC) and Japanese (1.5 kV DC) standards, the latter being adopted on the NSCR.

=== High-speed capability ===
According to a 2015 Japan International Cooperation Agency study, the demand for intercity rail is expected to only reach 25,000 one-way trips per day by 2039. This is only a fraction of the 700,000 one-way trips per day for the North–South Commuter Railway by the same target year. This means that there is not enough passenger traffic in the area to justify the construction of an electrified line in the level of the NSCR, let alone high-speed rail in the near-future.

However, the South Long Haul project shall be constructed to make the PNR competitive against air travel and proposed South Luzon Expressway extensions that lead to the Bicol Region. Trains will travel at a maximum speed of 160 kilometers per hour (100 mph), comparable to higher-speed rail or semi-high-speed rail in other countries. In 2019, DOTr Undersecretary for Railways Timothy John Batan stated that projects such as the South Long Haul were developed with eventual HSR construction in mind.

Three 160 km/h (100 mph) sections were identified to have a minimum curve radius of 2,000 m (6,600 ft). The measure also applies to some of China's upgraded conventional HSR lines and with upgrades such as dual tracking, electrification and signalling changes, the system's maximum speed shall be raised to 200 km/h (125 mph).

=== Station layout ===
Most stations in the South Long Haul project will be built at-grade. Based on publicly available information regarding Phase 1 however, three stations will be built elevated: Banlic, Bucal and Lucena. Bucal station will be built over two roads while Lucena station will be built at its current location near its Poblacion. Some parts of Banlic station and its northward extension to Sucat under Phase 4 will be built over private property, which is caused by the present Metro Commuter right-of way being superseded by the NSCR South. Some stations were also relocated to avoid downtown areas. The new Naga station for example was built 1.77 km (1.10 mi) southeast of it old location in Barangay Tabuco both to avoid causing traffic in its city center and to loosen its railway curvature.

Some will also feature island platforms, particularly on major stations such as San Pablo. Other mostly smaller stations will use side platforms. Additionally, smaller stations between Los Baños and Naga will have two passing sidings, one for each platform. This will allow express trains to pass by the middle mainline track. Each platform will be 200 m (660 ft) long for the 8-car trainsets, expandable to 250 m (820 ft) which is akin to the Metro Manila Subway's eventual platform extension. The railway platform height is 1,250 mm (4 ft 1 in).

==== Maintenance facilities ====
There are five maintenance facilities for the system. The following are:

1. San Pablo rolling stock depot — It will be the primary rolling stock depot for the system. Aside from storing passenger multiple units and freight locomotives, it will also store maintenance-of-way equipment such as ballast regulators, inspection cars, railgrinders and tamping machines. The station will also host the system's sole heavy maintenance facility being located at the junction of the South Main Line and the Batangas branch.
2. Daraga rolling stock servicing workshop — Located on the junction point of the Legazpi branch and the South Main Line, it will be the larger of the two medium-maintenance bases. Some maintenance-of-way equipment may be stored here.
3. Tagkawayan maintenance work area and rescue base — It will be the smaller of two medium maintenance bases.
4. Agdangan facility — It will be one of two light maintenance bases, which will only store track materials and not rolling stock.
5. Naga facility — Located beside the new Naga station, it will be the second of two light maintenance bases.

==== Interchanges ====
As of 2021, there are three rail-to-rail interchanges. These are Sucat and Banlic, both of which will connect with the North–South Commuter Railway, and Daraga, which will connect to the Metro Legazpi Tramway proposal under the initial name of Legazpi Tram.

== PNR Metro Commuter Line rehabilitation ==
A portion of the present PNR Metro Commuter Line shall be rebuilt so that the Bicol-bound line can reach Metro Manila and suburban Laguna. Phase 4 is the last phase of the original line and expects for the construction of new track to Sucat, which shall serve as the passenger terminus. Additionally, even though South Long Haul and NSCR trains will overlap on the present PNR right-of-way between Muntinlupa and Calamba, the two lines will not share tracks. Therefore, northbound passengers must transfer to an NSCR train at either Sucat or Banlic station.

With the transfer of commuter services to the NSCR, the present line shall be repurposed for freight trains. PNR general manager Junn Magno stated in a February 2021 interview with Motoring Today that he intends to use the line to connect the Manila North Harbor and the Batangas International Port. This will free truck traffic from the highway network in the process. On April 8, JICA's design team published their detailed design of the NSCR alignment and showed PNR Future Freight Track labels in the technical drafts to distinguish the South Long Haul's Manila extension to the Manila North Harbor. From the new freight terminus, the line will connect with its northern counterpart, which will connect the old Metro Commuter Line to the Subic–Clark Railway. The first of these being the Balagtas Dry Port Project, which will be a single-track freight line to traverse beside NSCR North to Balagtas, Bulacan.

Meanwhile, there were also plans in 2019 to continue using the line for passenger services as a transport redundancy measure. This is due to the arrival of new trainsets from PT INKA that were received between 2019 and 2020.

=== Dual gauge ===
According to bidding documents for the overhaul of the PNR Metro Commuter Line published in November 2021, the design of bridges and tracks shall allow the use of dual gauge track in the long term. There will be two separate standards for the tracks to be used. The 1,067 mm (3 ft 6 in) narrow-gauge track will use 37 kilogram per meter (25 pound per foot) rails as already used by the present network, while the standard-gauge track will use the 60 kilogram per meter (40 pound per foot) which is the UIC standard for mainline tracks. The railroad ties or sleepers shall be able to accommodate both gauges and track weights. The at-grade reconstruction will only cover the section between Solis and Sucat, with the South Long Haul proper being rebuilt to solely standard gauge. The PNR also announced its next purchase of narrow-gauge flatcars for its maintenance fleet. The flatcars was expected to enter service on or before 2026.

== See also ==
- North Luzon Railways – a similar railway project that was supposed to be financed by China and later cancelled
- Mindanao Railway – a similar railway project that was also supposed to be funded by China for its first phase
- South Luzon Expressway
