= Halang Dos station =

Railway station in Laguna, Philippines

Halang Dos

General information
- Location: Bacnotan Road, Halang; Calamba, Laguna; Philippines
- Coordinates: 14.1954°N 121.1608°E
- Owner: Philippine National Railways
- Operator: Philippine National Railways
- Line: South Main Line
- Platforms: Side platform
- Tracks: 1 mainline track

Construction
- Structure type: At grade

History
- Opened: December 16, 2025; 8 months ago

Services
Preceding station	PNR	Following station
Terminus	Inter-Provincial Commuter	Pansol towards Lucena
Location
- Location within Laguna Location within Luzon Location within Philippines

Halang Dos station is a railway station located on the South Main Line on the south side of Bacnotan Road in Calamba, Laguna, Philippines. It is the northern terminus of the PNR Inter-Provincial Commuter train service, and is currently the northern end of operations on the South Main Line.

== History ==
Halang Dos was opened on December 16, 2025 to temporarily replace Calamba station, which was closed to make way for Phase 3 of the North–South Commuter Railway (NCSR) project. The future Calamba station (the southern terminus of the NCSR) will be located across the road from Halang Dos, and is planned to open in 2032.

== Station facilities and services ==
As a flagstop, Halang Dos only contains basic facilities such as a platform, shelter, stairs and a ramp. Halang Dos has been exclusively served by the PNR 8000 class diesel multiple unit (DMU) since its opening. Since the station is a terminus and only has one track, locomotive–hauled services cannot operate services here, due to the lack of a second track for the locomotive to run-around the consist.

Halang Dos is usually served twice a day by the Inter-Provincial Commuter, with service announcements made by PNR on their Facebook page. As of July 2026, there is only one trainset, DMU 8001 dedicated to the service without any operational spares, causing service cancellations when 8001 needs maintenance.

Some notable landmarks near the station include the Calamba City Hall and the José Rizal Coliseum (simple).
