= KiHa 59 series =

Japanese train type

The KiHa 59 series (キハ59系) is a diesel multiple unit train type operated by Japanese National Railways and then later operated by JR Hokkaido, JR West, and JR East between 1985 and 2010, and by the Philippine National Railways (PNR) on the Metro South Commuter and Isarog Express lines since 2012. It is a reconditioned diesel train remodeled from aging JNR-Era rolling stocks converted from KiHa 56, 28 & 58 units for conversion into chartered-type trains across Japan.

The "KiHa" designation derives from the classification system used by JNR. "Ki" indicates a diesel-powered vehicle, while "Ha" indicates an ordinary passenger car, as opposed to a green car.

== History ==
=== JR Hokkaido ===
Alpha Continental Express
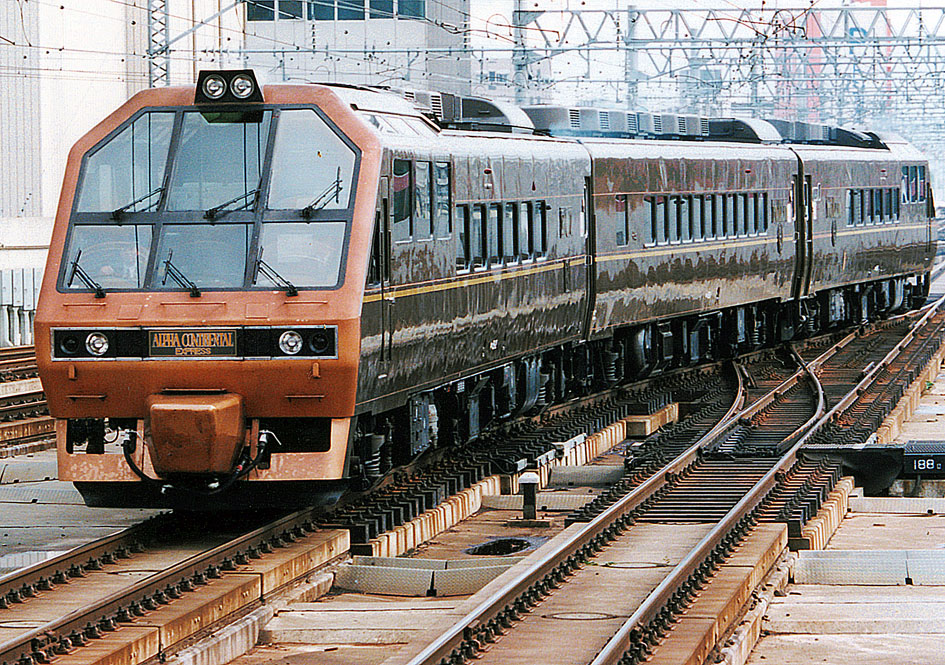
- JR Hokkaido's Alpha Continental Express three-car formation in 1994
- In service: 1985–1995
- Constructed: 1968 (originally KiRo 26, KiHa 56 & KiHa 58)
- Entered service: December 1985
- Refurbished: 1985
- Scrapped: 1995
- Number built: 4 vehicles
- Number in service: None
- Number preserved: 2 vehicles
- Number scrapped: 2 vehicles
- Formation: 3/4 cars
- Capacity: 156 (Alpha Continental Express, Resort Express, Peppermint Express); 208 (JTB Panorama Express)
- Operators: JNR (1985–1987); JR Hokkaido (1987–1995)

Specifications
- Doors: 1 sliding door per side per car
- Prime mover: Komatsu DMF11HZ (250 hp)
- Track gauge: 1,067 mm (3 ft 6 in)

In December 1985, KiHa 59 was remodeled from KiHa 26 and KiHa 56 cars at the Naebo plant in Sapporo, Japan. It was the last resort train to be introduced by the Japanese National Railways which was privatized to be separated and destined to JR Hokkaido in Hokkaido region. The train was initially called "Alpha Continental Express" and started operating on the Ishikatsu Line as a chartered tourist train. It attracted widespread attention due to its design and facilities, and was operated as a group chartered train, and been offered temporary limited express trains all over the country against the backdrop of the resort boom before and after the era.

The Alpha Continental Express was nicknamed as "Alcon" which they only used when contracted transportation with both Tomamu and Sahoro resorts, and they also offer other services used such as "Resort Express", "Peppermint Express", and "JTB Panorama Express".

Although it was popular during that time, they also encountered different problems which became apparent when the newer rolling stocks introduced. The maximum speed was limited to 95 km/h, which made it difficult to adapt to the timetables of newer JR Hokkaido express trains, which they are struggled to perform on the lines to be arrived and depart on-time.

It has been used for nearly 10 years since the conversion and nearly 30 years since being manufactured in the 1960s. It was withdrawn in 1995.

==== Formations ====
The Alpha Continental Express trainset was formed as follows (1985 – 1995). They also offered in different train services in Hokkaido region such as "Resort Express", "Peppermint Express", but not "JTB Panorama Express" which they add one carriage in 1986, resulting in a four-car formation.

Car No.	1	2	3
Number	KiHa 59-1	KiHa 29-1	KiHa 59-2
Original number	KiHa 56-201	KiRo 26-201	KiHa 56-209

They also operated the special train service called "JTB Panorama Express" trainset which was formed as follows (1986-1995).

Car No.	1	2	3	4
Number	KiHa 59-1	KiHa 29-1	KiHa 59-101	KiHa 59-2
Original number	KiHa 56-201	KiRo 26-201	KiHa 56-212	KiHa 56-209

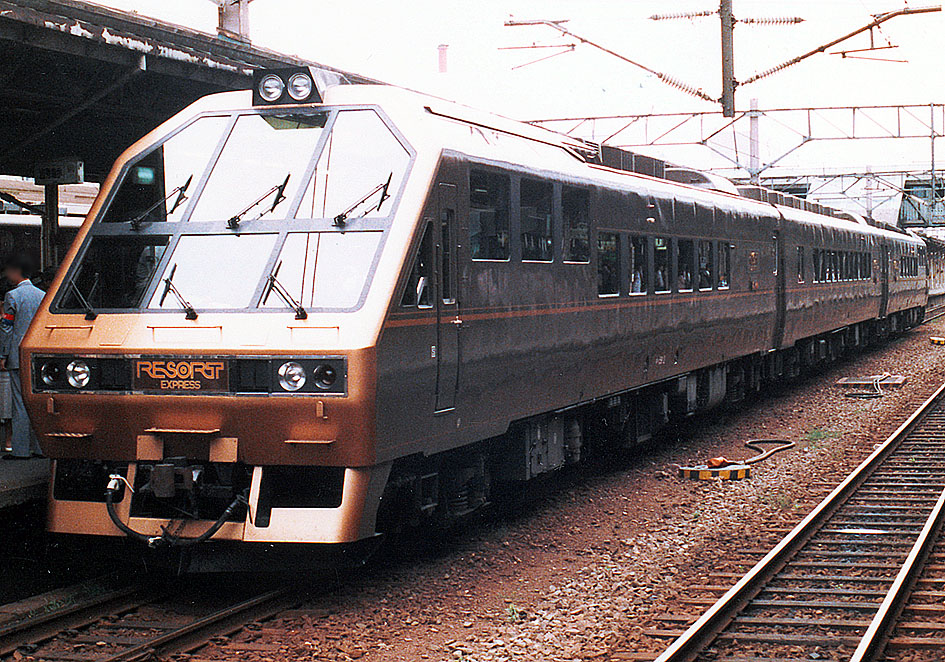
"Resort Express" special train services in 1986

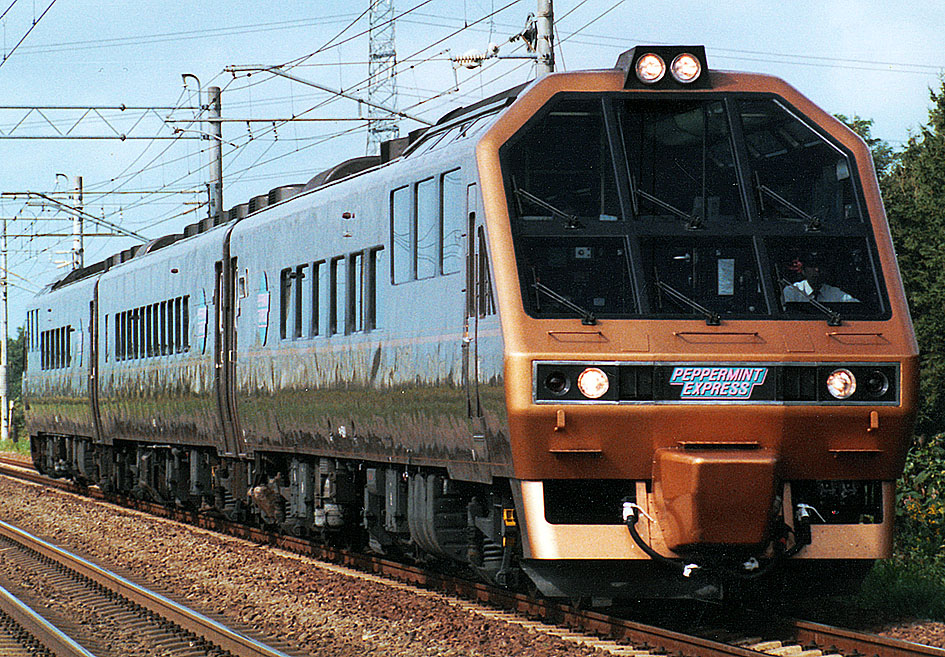
"Perppermint Express" special train service

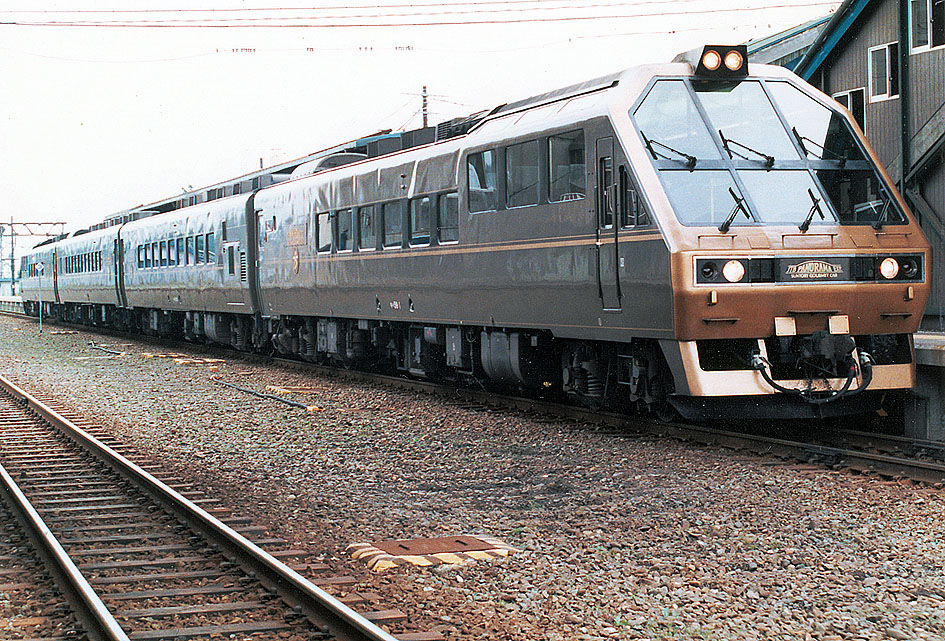
JR Hokkaido's KiHa 59 Alpha Continental Express special service, the "JTB Panorama Express" in a four-car formation

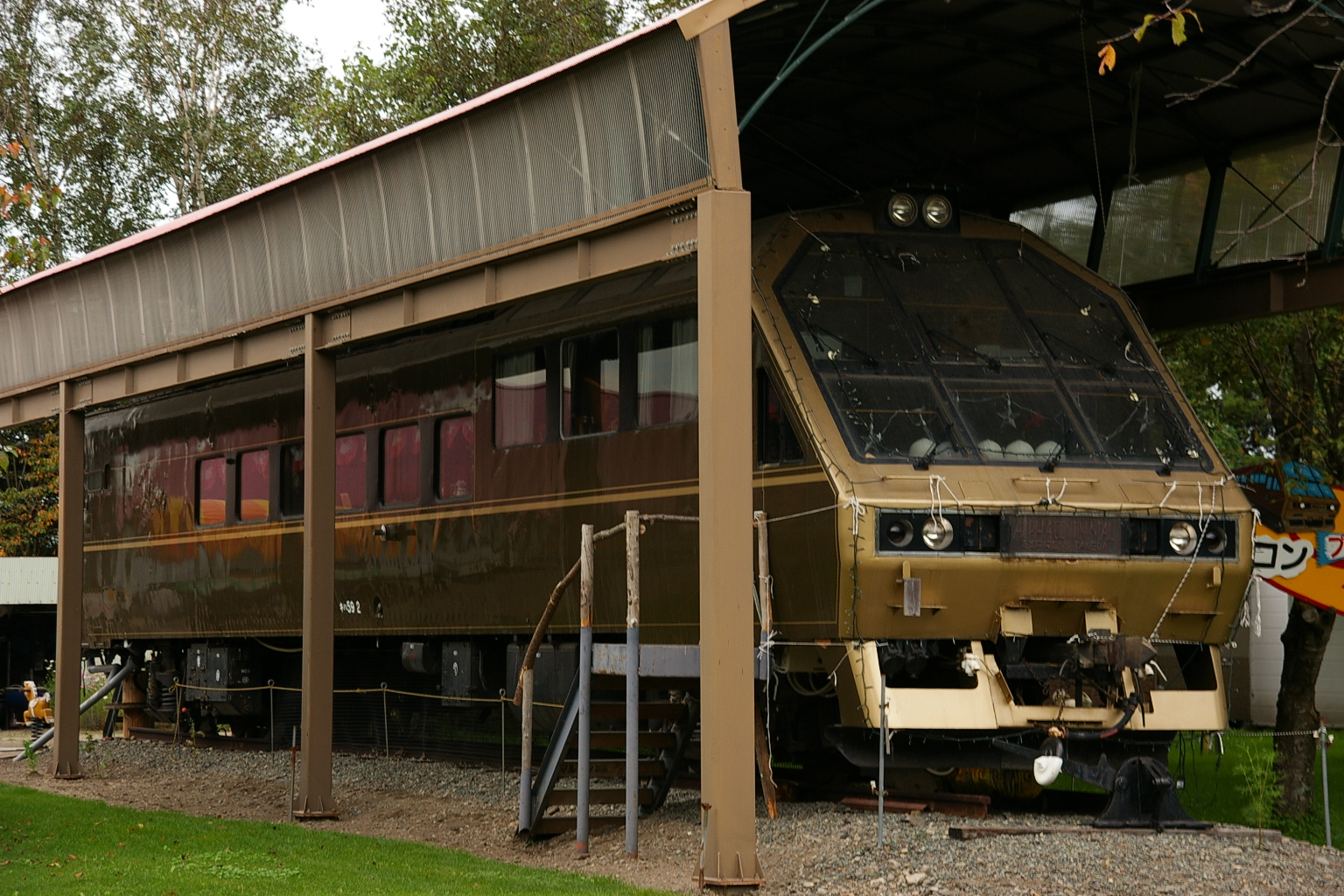
JR Hokkaido KiHa 59-2 "Alpha Continental Express" in preservation

=== JR East ===
Gracia KoGaNe
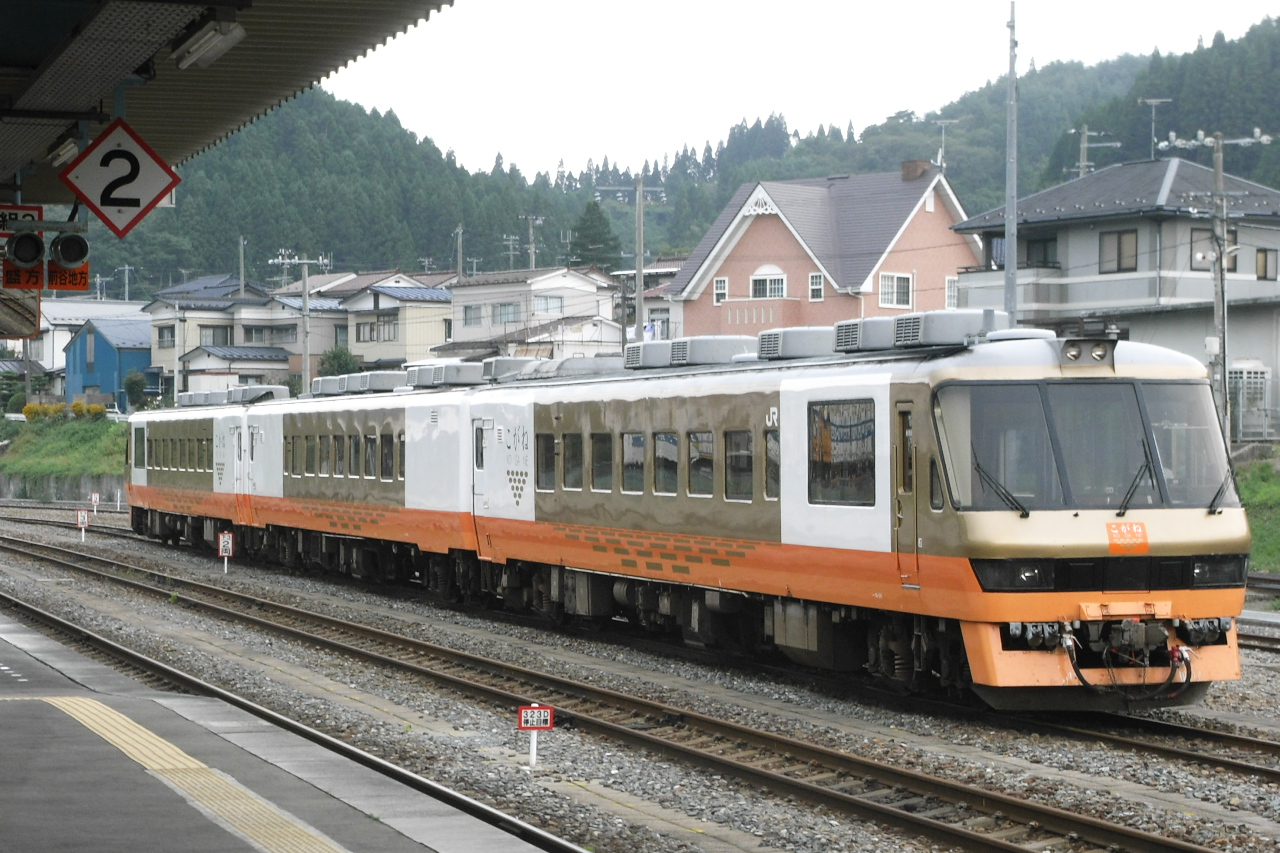
- The KiHa 59 series Kogane trainset in 2008
- In service: 1989–2010 (Japan); 2012–present (Philippines)
- Constructed: 1967 (as KiHa 28 intermediate car); 1968 (originally KiHa 58)
- Entered service: November 1989 (Gracia Joyful train); 2003 (Kogane)
- Refurbished: 1989; 2003; 2019
- Number built: 3 vehicles
- Number in service: 3 vehicles
- Formation: 3 cars
- Capacity: 84 (Gracia); 82 (Kogane)
- Operators: JR East (1989–2010); Philippine National Railways (2012–2014, 2019–present)
- Depot: Tutuban
- Lines served: PNR Metro South Commuter (Premier Train); PNR Mayon Limited (Isarog Limited Express)

Specifications
- Doors: 1 sliding door per side per car
- Prime mover: Komatsu DMF11HZ (250 hp)
- Track gauge: 1,067 mm (3 ft 6 in)

The three-car train was converted in November 1989 at JR East's Koriyama Works from former KiHa 58 and KiHa 28 diesel cars to become the KiHa 59 series Gracia Joyful Train set for use on special charter services in the Sendai area and north east of Japan. The train was withdrawn in May 2003 and rebuilt to become the Kogane trainset, repainted in a white, gold, and orange livery and re-entering service from July 2003.

The Kogane trainset was withdrawn from service on 26 December 2010, and was subsequently shipped to the Philippines.

==== Formations ====
The Gracia trainset was formed as follows (1989 to May 2003).

Car No.	1	2	3
Number	KiRo 59-510	KiRo 29-506	KiRo 59-511
Original number	KiHa 58-1038	KiHa 28-2505 (1968–71), and became KiHa 28-1505 (1971–89)	KiHa 58-1039

The Kogane trainset was formed as follows (July 2003 - December 2010).

Car No.	1	2	3
Number	KiHa 59-510	KiHa 29-506	KiHa 59-511

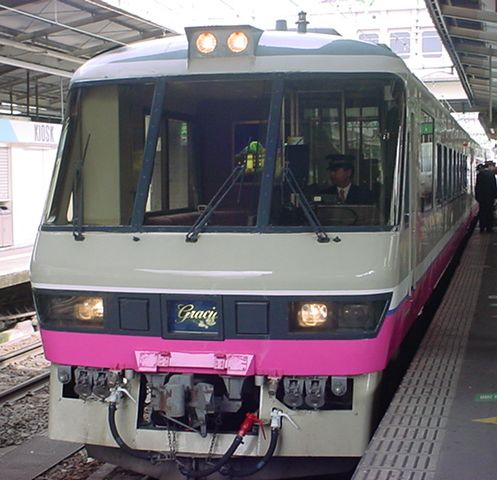
Gracia Joyful Train in 2003

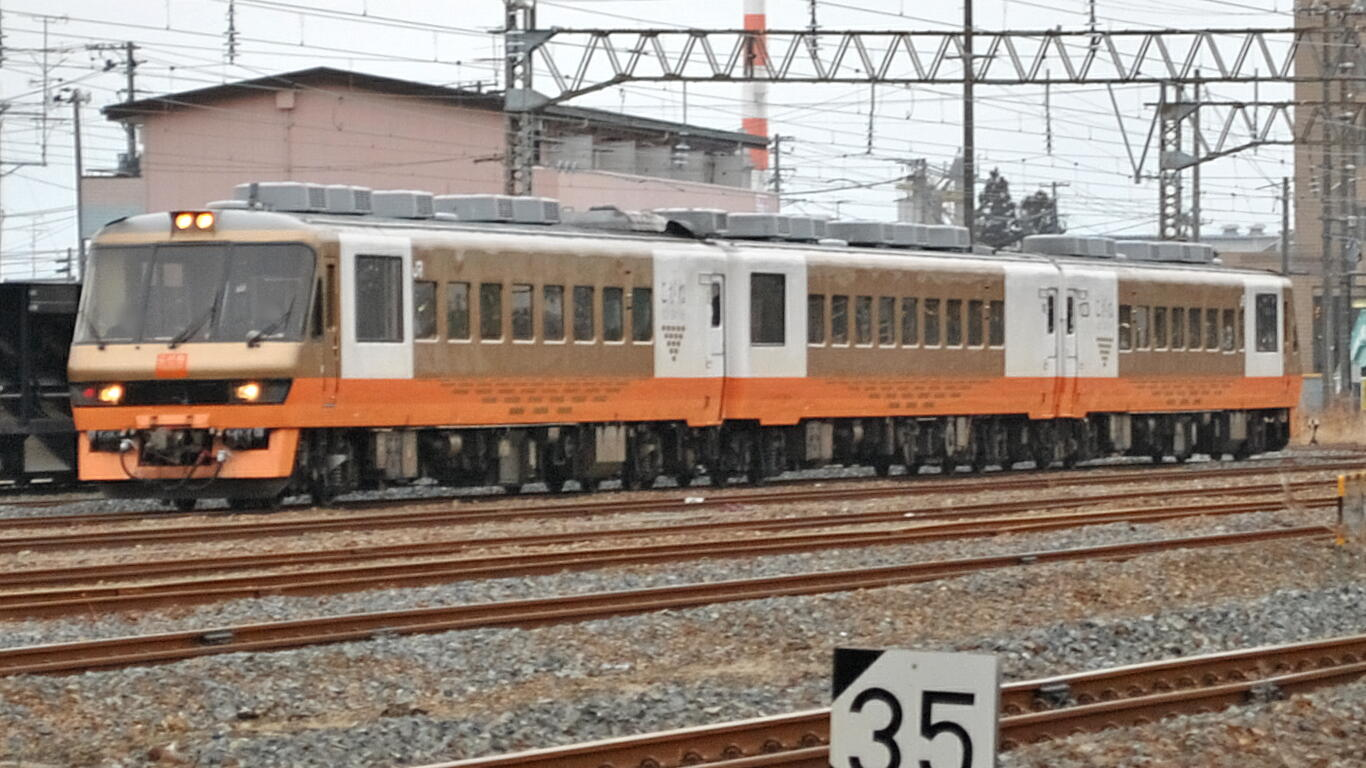
KoGaNe Train in 2010

=== JR West ===
VIVA West
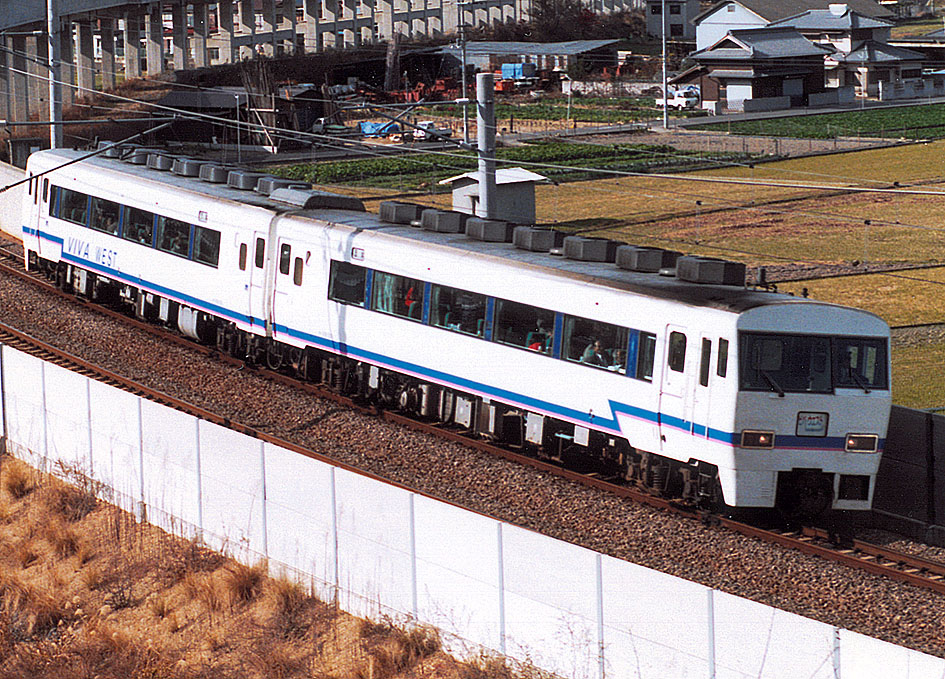
- JR West Viva West trainset in 1990
- In service: 1989–1999
- Constructed: 1962 (as KiHa 28 & KiHa 58 intermediate car)
- Entered service: July 1989
- Refurbished: 1989
- Scrapped: 1999
- Number built: 2 vehicles
- Number in service: None
- Number preserved: None
- Number scrapped: 2 vehicles
- Formation: 2 cars
- Capacity: 52
- Operator: JR West (1989–1999)

Specifications
- Doors: 2 sliding doors per side per car
- Prime mover: Komatsu DMF11HZ (250 hp)
- Track gauge: 1,067 mm (3 ft 6 in)

JR West introduced their "VIVA West" Joyful Train service in 1989.

It was formed at JR West Hiroshima works after "Resort Saloon Fiesta" train services in 1989 by remodeling former KiHa 28 and 58 series cars. The remodeling work was carried out at the Habu rolling stock plant (now the Shimonoseki General Rolling Stock Office).

It was also temporarily used as a passenger train for short train services, and ended operation after nearly ten years and was scrapped in March 1999.

==== Formations ====
The Viva West trainset was formed as follows (1989 – 1999).

Car No.	1	2
Number	KiHa 59-501	KiHa 29-501
Original number	KiHa 58-176	KiHa 28-2132

== Operations in the Philippine National Railways ==
In its operations under the Philippine National Railways, it served as an intercity train and premiere train, but its windshields had to be armored with steel mesh to prevent the glass from being pelted by train stoners. The unit underwent general renovation and overhaul in 2019. The armoring was later removed when the livery was updated to match the newly arrived PT-INKA livery, along with the updating of the windshields into more durable polycarbonate panels.

On 20 September 2019, the PNR Kogane trainset was used on test run and clearing operations on the Calamba-Los Baños section of the PNR Metro Commuter Line. Kogane also went to Legazpi for the inspection of the PNR South Main Line together with 917 prior to the PNR South Long Haul project.

=== Formations ===
The Kogane trainset in service with Philippine National Railways is formed as follows.

Car No.	1	2	3
Number	Kiha 59510	Kiha 29506	Kiha 59511

=== Incidents ===
- In July 2012, the Kogane train derailed near Lopez, Quezon.
- In February 2020, a window in the Kogane trainset shattered due to a stoning incident.

=== Gallery ===
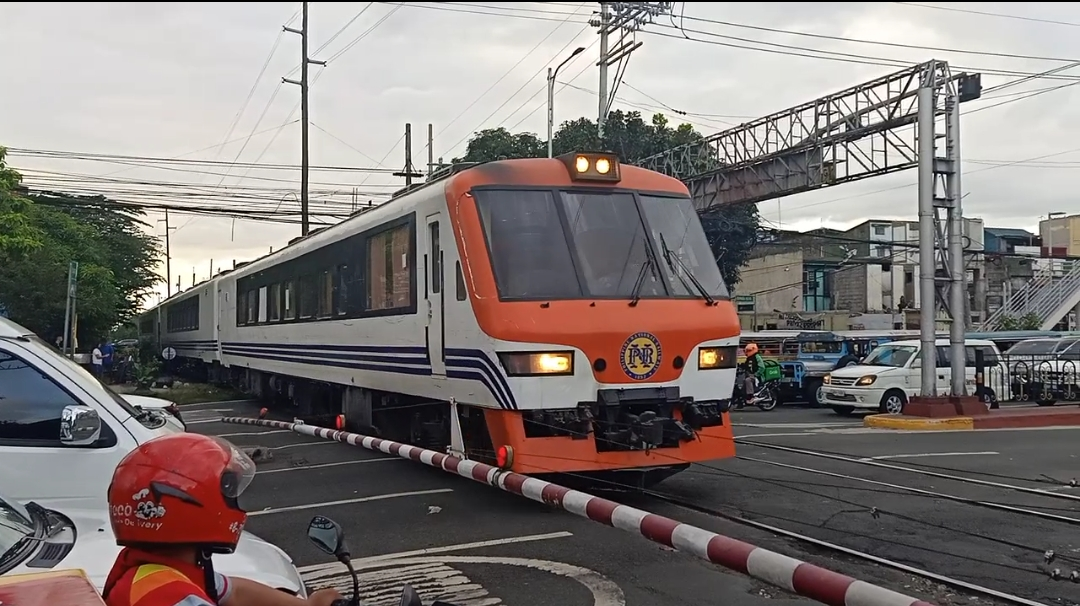
KiHa 59 Kogane set in new livery for IRRI, Laguna arriving España station, February 2020.

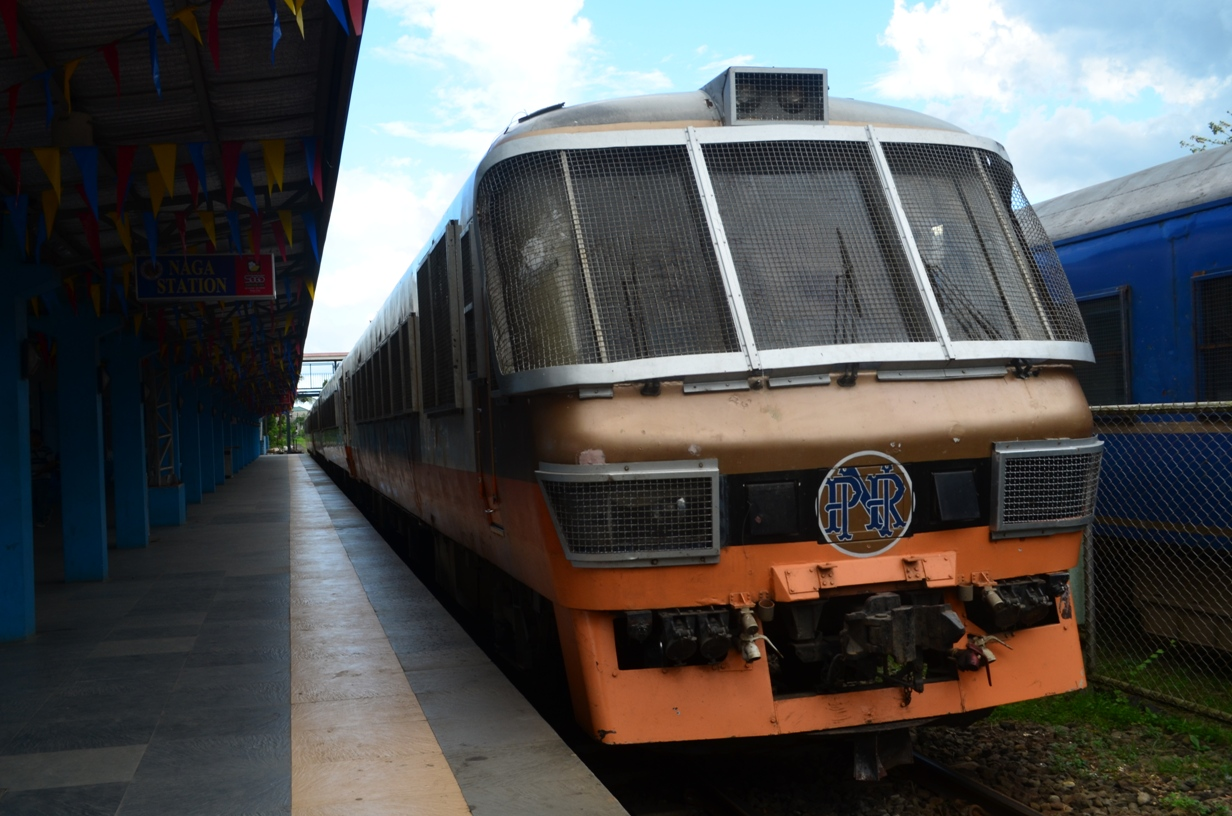
PNR's ex-Kogane train in former Japanese livery at Naga Station, 2012
