= Lucena station =

Railway station in Lucena, Philippines

Lucena
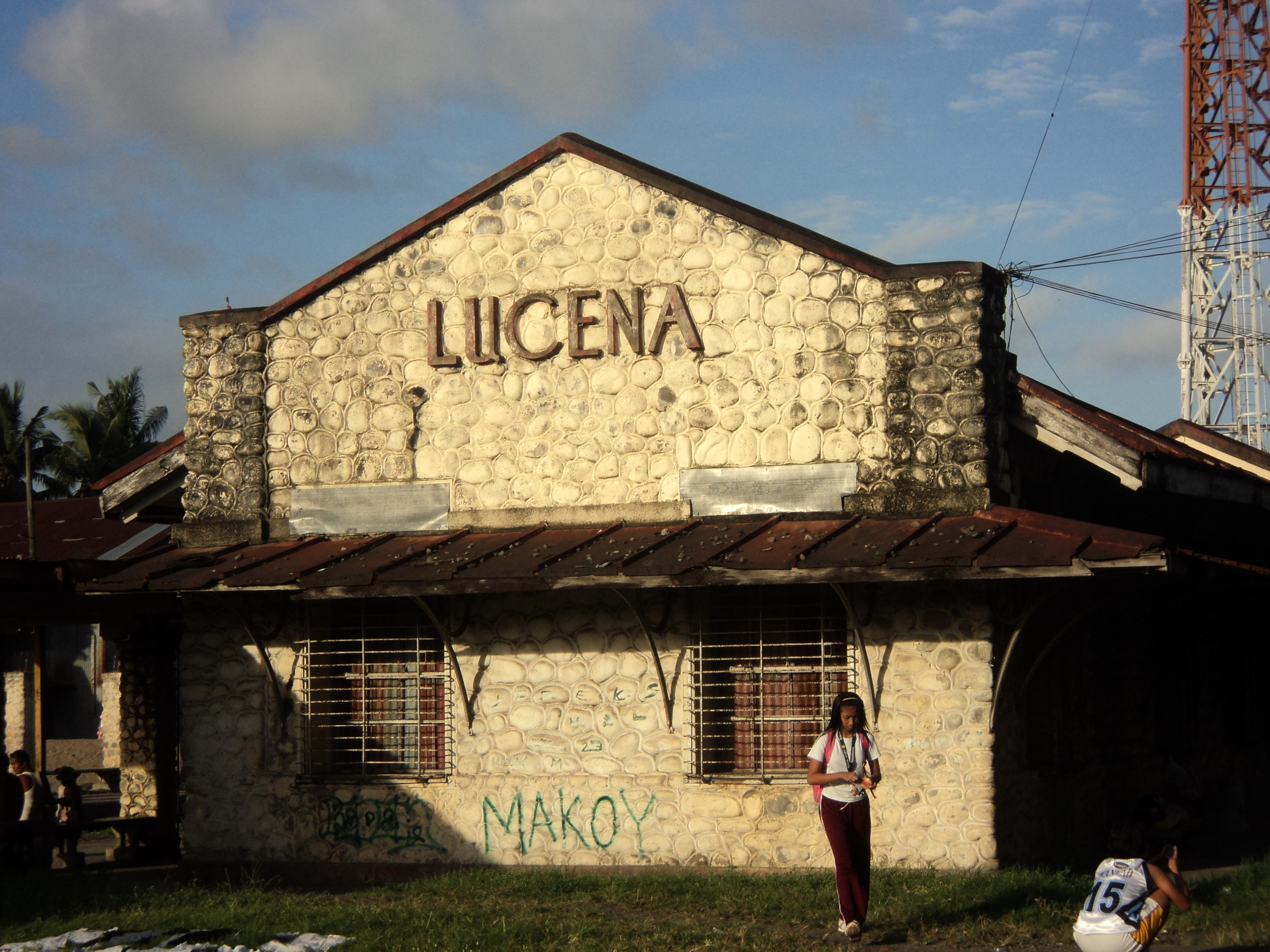
- The facade of Lucena station in 2012

General information
- Location: Gov Constantino, Barangay 10
- Coordinates: 13°55′37.07″N 121°36′47.06″E
- Owner: Philippine National Railways
- Operator: Philippine National Railways
- Line: South Main Line
- Platforms: Side platform
- Tracks: 1, plus 4 sidings

Construction
- Structure type: At grade
- Accessible: Yes

Other information
- Station code: LC

History
- Opened: February 10, 1913; 113 years ago
- Closed: 2006
- Rebuilt: 2015

Services
Preceding station	PNR	Following station
San Pablo towards Tutuban	Bicol Express	Agdangan towards Legazpi
San Pablo towards Tutuban	Isarog Limited	Agdangan towards Naga
Sariaya towards Halang Dos	Inter-Provincial Commuter	Terminus
Location

Lucena station is a railway station located on the South Main Line in Lucena, Quezon, Philippines.

The station was opened on February 10, 1913, the station building was enlarged in 1938 together with the completion of the Main Line South. It was a major stopping point on the South Main Line for PNR intercity services until the line's closure in 2006 after Typhoon Milenyo damaged infrastructure. It served both the Bicol Express and the Mayon Limited. It is near the Quezon Provincial Government Center, which houses the provincial government of Quezon, as well as Perez Park and the Lucena Fire Station. Further away from the station are the Port of Lucena, the Lucena Airport and SM City Lucena.

The PNR project, titled “Restoration of Station Building,” was funded with P15.3 million and was being undertaken by Batangas-based Granby Trading and Construction. Started on June 25 2015, the project is expected to be completed on Oct. 25 2015.

The station is considered one of the remaining heritage structures in Lucena, being considered by the local government as “important cultural property.” In February 2022, the station was reopened as a terminus for the San Pablo–Lucena Commuter Service for a test run, even though the station is in a partially rebuilt state. There are plans to reopen the station before May 2022. The Chinese ODA-funded rebuild will construct a new station while preserving the remnants of the original.

On October 21, 2024, the PNR resumed its PNR South Main Line services for the Lucena-Calamba-Lucena line. The PNR train stops include San Pablo station, Calamba station, Sariaya, Lutucan, Candelaria, Tiaong (Lalig), IRRI, UP Los Baños station-Junction station, Masili and Pansol stations.

Lucena station has depot and maintenance facilities.
