= PNR South Main Line =

Philippine rail line

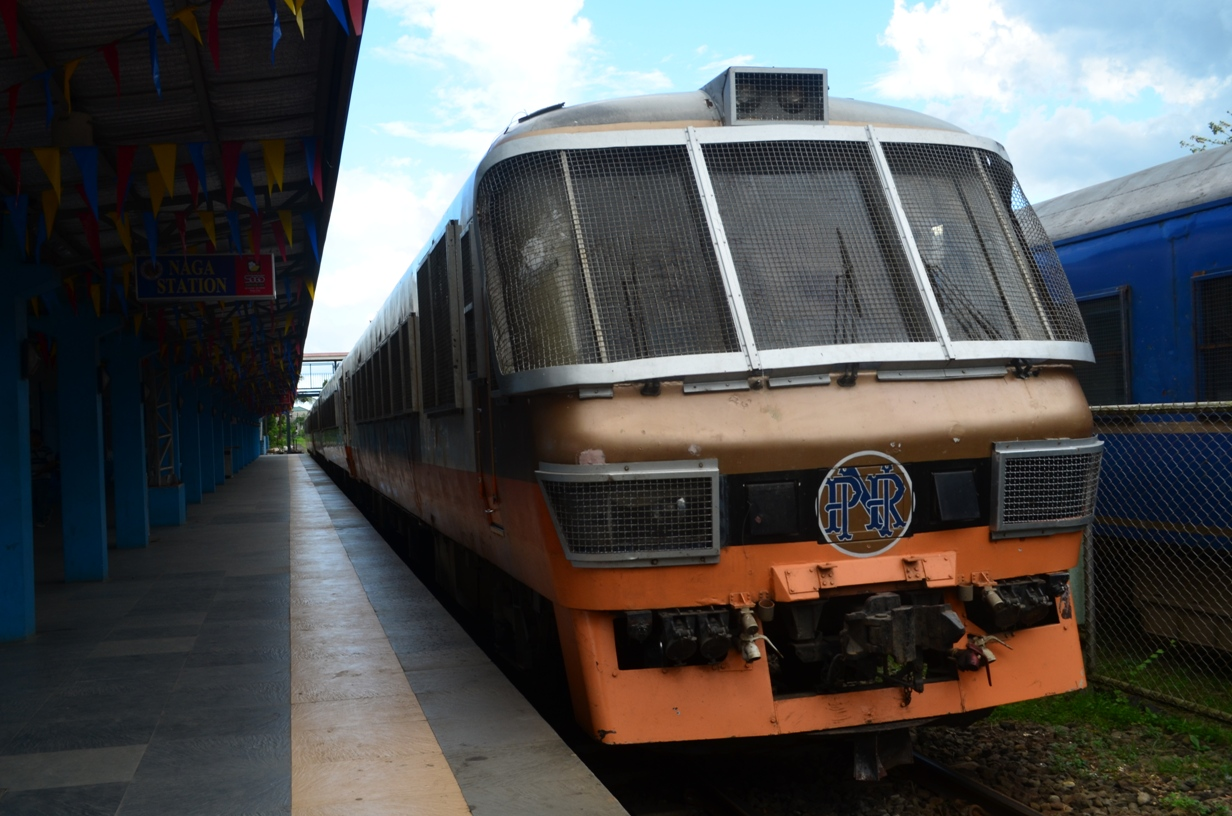
- A Kiha 59 DMU parked at Naga station in 2012 when intercity services were still operational.

Overview
- Status: Operational
- Owner: Department of Transportation
- Locale: Metro Manila (closed); Calabarzon; Bicol Region
- Termini: Tutuban (Note: PNR Metro Commuter Line only.) San Pablo (Note: Inter-Provincial Commuter only.) Sipocot (Note: Bicol Commuter only.); IRRI Lucena Naga or Legazpi
- Stations: 32 active (Note: 6 for Inter-Provincial Commuter, 26 for Bicol Commuter.)

Service
- Type: Commuter rail Regional rail Inter-city rail (former)
- System: Philippine National Railways
- Services: 2
- Operator: Philippine National Railways
- Rolling stock: Refer to the rolling stock section below
- Daily ridership: 2,447 estimated passengers daily (2023)
- Ridership: 893,000 (2023)

History
- Opened: 1916; 110 years ago (Note: In 1916, the line was opened between Manila and Lucena, Quezon.)
- Closed: 2014; 12 years ago (Calamba–Sipocot) (Note: Intercity services were suspended in that date, resulting to the closure of the section between Calamba and Sipocot.); May 5, 2015; 11 years ago (Tutuban–Calamba) (Note: The South Main Line and the Metro Commuter Line closed for safety tests following a derailment incident of a train in April 2015.)
- Reopened: July 23, 2015; 11 years ago (Tutuban–Alabang) (Note: The section from Alabang to Calamba reopened a few months after the opening of the Tutuban-Alabang section.); December 1, 2019; 6 years ago (Calamba–IRRI); June 26, 2022; 4 years ago (San Pablo–Lucena)

Technical
- Line length: 479 km (298 mi); 255 km (158 mi) (active)
- Track length: 504 km (313 mi); 319 km (198 mi) (active)
- Number of tracks: Double track (Tutuban–Sucat); Single-track (rest of the line)
- Character: At-grade
- Track gauge: 1,067 mm (3 ft 6 in)
- Minimum radius: 150 m (490 ft)
- Electrification: None
- Operating speed: 75 km/h (47 mph)
- Highest elevation: 208.6 m (684 ft) near Camalig, Albay
- Maximum incline: 15‰

The PNR South Main Line (Filipino: Pangunahing Linyang Patimog ng PNR, also known as Southrail and formerly the Main Line South) is one of the two trunk lines that form the Philippine National Railways' network in the island of Luzon, Philippines. It was opened in stages between 1916 and 1938 by the Manila Railroad. Services peaked in the 1940s until the late 1960s, when the system started to decline. Since 1988, it was the only functioning inter-city rail after its counterpart to the north, the North Main Line, was closed. The intercity section of the line in Laguna, Quezon and the Bicol Region was then closed and reopened repeatedly between 2004 and 2014 due to a combination of declining ridership and was closed since then. Currently, only a little more than half of line is operational as the line currently serves two commuter services, namely the Inter-Provincial Commuter from San Pedro, Laguna to Lucena, Quezon and the Bicol Commuter regional rail service between Sipocot and Naga, Camarines Sur and Legazpi, Albay, following the closure of the main line, the PNR Metro Commuter Line between Tutuban station and Laguna.

Since its closure, there has been a planned overhaul of the line. The railway will consist of two standard-gauge lines which will overlap in southern Metro Manila and Laguna. One is the North–South Commuter Railway's South section between Tutuban and Solis stations in north-central Metro Manila to Calamba station in Calamba, Laguna. This route will be electrified with direct current power through overhead lines. The other is the PNR South Long Haul from Sucat station in Muntinlupa to Matnog station in Matnog, Sorsogon. This route will continue to be operated by diesel stock but will run at a maximum speed of 160 km/h (99 mph), over twice higher than the existing narrow-gauge line.

== History ==
Planning of the Luzon network started in 1875. To the south of Manila would be a line leading to Legazpi, Albay and a branch line leading to Bauan, Batangas.

=== Pre-PNR era ===
Manila Railroad's system during its peak. Map contains lines that have been dismantled.

Some parts of what will become the South Main Line were first constructed in 1903 as part of the Antipolo Line to Rizal under the virtue of Insular Government Act No. 703. The formal construction of a main line to the south of Tutuban station began in 1909 by the virtue of Act No. 1905. By 1909, there was already a line between Tutuban and Naic, Cavite. This was known as the Naic line. Another line was also opened from Calamba, Laguna to Bauan via Batangas City. More lines were constructed into the 1910s including the lines from Nueva Cáceres, Ambos Camarines to Legazpi or Tabaco, Albay as the Legazpi Division, the Pagsanjan branch line and the extension of the Antipolo line to Montalban. Between 1916 and 1919, a new line to Tayabas province was opened and was named the Main Line South and had branch lines covering all provinces in the Southern Tagalog region.

The first intercity service on the new Main Line South was the first Bicol Express, which originally only stopped at Aloneros station in Guinayangan, Quezon between 1916 and 1919. The Main Line South was connected to the Legazpi Division by a fleet of train ferries between Quezon and Camarines Sur. This ferry service became increasingly redundant as the last rail connecting Manila to Bicol was laid on November 17, 1937.

The second Bicol Express, which at that point had been running the full length of the new Main Line South to Legazpi, was inaugurated on January 31, 1938 and became a regular service by May 8 of the same year. On the same day, the golden spike was struck by then-president Manuel L. Quezon at Del Gallego, Camarines Sur. Meanwhile, services on the Naic line and the Tabaco branch were cut and the tracks were dismantled later that year.

Services on the new line peaked for a brief period between 1938 and 1941, and were regarded as one of the most profitable eras for the Manila Railroad. However, most of the rail infrastructure was destroyed by World War II when the United States fought against the Empire of Japan in 1941 and 1944-45. Rehabilitation of the network cost the Manila Railroad ₱20 million (convertible to US$115 million in 2020) and by the late 1950s, most of the network had been restored. More branch lines were cut including the Pagsanjan and Antipolo branches. On August 12, 1956, the Manila Railroad was one of the first in Asia to fully retire its steam locomotive fleet and adopt dieselization.

=== PNR era ===
The Manila Railroad was reorganized into the Philippine National Railways in 1964 by the virtue of Republic Act 4156. The early days of PNR during the 1960s and the early 1970s were also considered by the agency as its best. During this period, there were already proposed extensions of the South Main Line to Sorsogon province enacted by Republic Act 6366. However, increasing maintenance costs, natural disasters, and competition from highways prevented the PNR from expanding, and eventually caused the eventual decline of the entire system.

==== Decline and contemporary history ====
Improvised trolleys powered by small gasoline engines locally called "skates" is seen crossing PNR bridge in Libmanan, Camarines Sur.

The latter years of the 1970s were increasingly burdensome to the PNR as natural disasters, increasing maintenance costs, as well as stiff competition with the national highway network started the decline of the PNR as a whole. By 1988, only the South Main Line remained as the sole intercity line, although commuter trains on the North Main Line continued to run to Malolos station until 1997. Since then, services further dwindled until only a small section of the line between Tutuban and Santa Rosa stations remained active by 2014 as the rest of the line was closed. Services were suspended in May 2015 following a derailment incident of a Hyundai Rotem DMU in between EDSA and Nichols. That same month, the Department of Transportation and Communications opened bidding for the double-tracking of the section between Sucat and Alabang, though it was later not pursued. Operations resumed on July 23, 2015 from Tutuban to Alabang.

In May 2019, the agency was investigated after piles of railroad ties were found in the front yard of Muntinlupa station. These ties were meant for the rehabilitation of the line near Hondagua station in Quezon. On December 1, 2019, commuter rail services on the Metro Commuter were extended from Calamba to IRRI station, a request stop in front of the International Rice Research Institute headquarters in Los Baños.

During the enhanced community quarantine in Luzon, the intercity section was temporarily reactivated for the PNR's Hatid Probinsya (lit. 'Send Home to the Provinces') program in June 2020. So-called "locally-stranded individuals", or people who wished to return to their hometowns amidst the lockdown, were returned to Bicol via so-called LSI trains. This is part of the larger Balik Probinsya (lit. 'Return to the Provinces') program by the national government to decongest Metro Manila and develop the countryside regions of the Philippines both during and after the COVID-19 pandemic. The fifth and last known service was on August 29, 2020. The line was once again closed after the program ended.

On February 14, 2022, Valentine's Day, a regional rail service between San Pablo, Laguna and Lucena, Quezon made its first run. On June 25, President Rodrigo Duterte inaugurated the Inter-Provincial Commuter service, with operations commencing the following day.

In May 2024, it was announced that the local consortium led by Philtrak Inc. and its chairman and chief executive, Francis Yuseco, offered to transform the idle rail tracks of the old railway tracks into a new mass transit and logistics hub. Additionally, a plan to connect Tutuban, Manila to San Pablo, Laguna utilizing European Road Trains and the hybrid electric road transit was designed by the Department of Science and Technology. The proposed articulated bus train will occupy five meters on each side of the railway, while the remaining open spaces will be utilized for housing, logistics, public markets, and post-harvest facilities, with transit stations along the way. On July 15 of the same year, it was announced that the PNR would revive freight services and pursue a ₱5 billion plan to retrofit the existing line between Laguna and Albay for cargo movement. The plan includes the operation of cargo trains between Calamba, Laguna, and Legazpi in Albay by 2025, and the building of a dry port in Calamba where containers can be carried in and out of freight trains.

While the government seeks alternative financing for the PNR South Long Haul project, the PNR has expressed its intent to revive the Bicol Express. It plans to retrofit the south Luzon alignment for freight rail, potentially benefiting the nearly 600,000 farmers in the Bicol region.

On October 21, 2024, the PNR resumed its services for the Lucena-Calamba-Lucena line. The PNR train stops include San Pablo station, Calamba station, Sariaya, Lutucan, Candelaria, Tiaong (Lalig), IRRI, UP Los Baños station-Junction station, Masili and Pansol stations.

In 2025, efforts will be made by the government to rehabilitate the line, including the rebuilding of Binahan Bridge in Ragay, with the complete route expected to be reopened by 2026. In his State of the Nation address, President Bongbong Marcos highlighted that the Bicol Line is a crucial channel and stated his intent to restore it to complete functionality.

== Station list ==
There are currently 47 stations being used on the South Main Line, 31 of these are for the Metro South Commuter line, 6 stations for the Inter-Provincial Commuter line, and 10 for the Bicol Commuter service. It previously served all provinces in Calabarzon, as well as Camarines Sur and Albay. Currently, only sections in Metro Manila, Laguna, Quezon, and Camarines Sur are served.

== Services ==
=== Active ===
Since 2024, there are two operating services on the South Main Line, the Bicol Commuter service, and the Inter-Provincial Commuter service. These trains serve separate sections of the line and do not connect to each other.

==== Bicol Commuter ====
The Bicol Commuter is a local train service in the Bicol Region, particularly in the province of Camarines Sur. The service originates at Naga and terminates at Lupi Viejo.

Previously operating between Naga-Sipocot, the Naga–Legazpi route reopened on December 27, 2023, and the Naga-Sipocot route was extended to Lupi Viejo on November 5, 2025.

On November 10, 2025, Bicol Commuter services on the Naga-Legazpi route were suspended after Typhoon Uwan caused significant damage to a bridge along the route in Guinobatan, Albay, with the Department of Transport (DOTr) immediately issuing a directive to fast-track repairs. Despite an initial reopening date of February 2026, services remain suspended as of July 2026. An inspection of the bridge was carried out on July 13, 2026, and damaged sleepers were removed while PNR continues the procurement process for machinery and materials to carry out the repair.

==== Inter-Provincial Commuter ====
The Inter-Provincial Commuter is a 77-kilometer (48 mi) commuter and regional rail service from San Pablo to Calamba, Laguna and San Pablo to Lucena, Quezon.

In the lead up to the service commencing, a PNR 9000 class locomotive No. 9003, PNR 8300 class trainset 8302 and a LC350 class switcher were transferred from Manila to San Pablo on February 13, 2022. That same day, a fare matrix was published by PNR. The service made its first trial run on February 14, 2022, and was reopened on June 26. The service currently runs using PNR 8000 class DMU 8001 without any operational spare trainsets allocated, causing service cancellations when 8001 needs maintenance.

=== Defunct ===
In 2006, regular intercity operations on the South Main Line were indefinitely suspended. Issues such as rail metal theft and natural disasters have hampered the line's intercity service from operating regularly ever since. Illegal settlers also live close to the rails in Metro Manila and Laguna sections of the line. In Camarines Sur, liquefaction of the track's embankment caused a section of the line in Sipocot to sink. This forced the inaugural service of the new Bicol Express in 2011 to slow down to a near stop while passing through the area. On September 21, 2019, a KiHa 59 and a rerailment train consisting of a newly-repainted PNR 900 class locomotive and a CMC coach conducted a test run from Tutuban to Naga.

Metro Manila operations were suspended on March 28, 2024 to make way for the construction of the North-South Commuter Railway.

==== Metro South Commuter ====
The regular Metro South Commuter served the Greater Manila Area from Tutuban to Alabang in Muntinlupa, Mamatid in Cabuyao, Calamba, or IRRI in Los Baños. There were commuter services leading to College from 1976 to 1986, which was superseded by the present service to IRRI. There were also named services to Guadalupe station in Mandaluyong and Carmona station in Carmona, Cavite. These were named after indigenous flora. The present Metro South Commuter line was closed to give way for the construction of the North–South Commuter Railway (NSCR). The line's current trainsets are set to be transferred to operating services in Southern Luzon, the Inter-Provincial Commuter and the Bicol Commuter Lines, which allows the lines to increase trips and serve more passengers. The present South Commuter Line will also be rebuilt and it will serve as an alternate transport mode to the NSCR, as well as for future freight services.

- The Shuttle Service operated between Bicutan on the South Main Line to Governor Pascual on the North Main Line.

==== Bicol Express ====
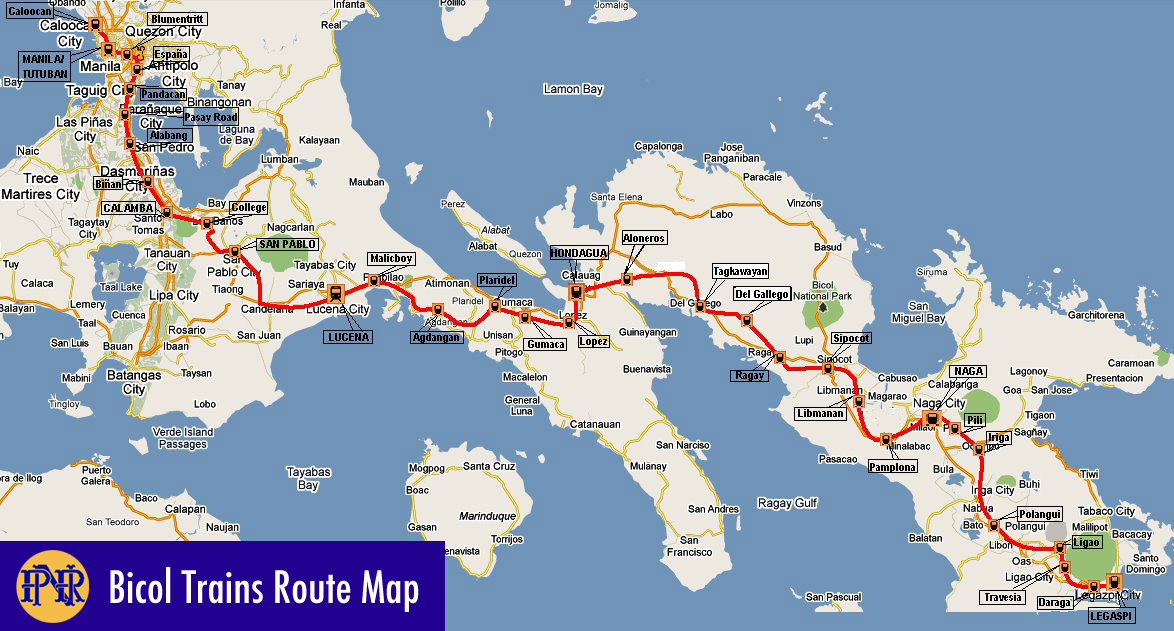
Route map of Bicol Express

The Bicol Express was the primary service on the South Main Line. The service started operations between Manila and Aloneros station in Guinayangan, Quezon by 1919 along with the Lucena Express. A separate train between Pamplona and Tabaco, and between Port Ragay and Legazpi was opened by 1933. The Tabaco branch line during this era was closed in 1937 and instead, they linked these three sections into a single line. This formed the backbone of the South Main Line and was subsequently opened in 1938. This service was short lived and ended during the Japanese occupation of the Philippines in 1942. During this era, the Japanese government focused on rebuilding the North Main Line instead and extended it to Sudipen on the border between Ilocos Sur and La Union, and the south line's rehabilitation was cut to San Pablo, Laguna.

After the line's post-war rehabilitation, another service was opened. The service immediately became popular with the public and more services were introduced on August 16, 1954.

There were two services of this type: the daytime Bicol Express and the Night Express which was the night train counterpart. The Bicol Express leaving Manila was numbered 511 and its night counterpart leaving Legazpi was numbered 513. The Bicol Express leaving Legazpi was numbered 512 and the Night Express leaving Manila was numbered 514. The trains only stopped at six stations between Tutuban and Legazpi: Paco, Lucena, Tagkawayan, Sipocot, Naga and Ligao. Journey times lasted 13 hours between the two termini. Services were expanded until the 1970s.

By 1998, Bicol Express was the only intercity service on the South Main Line. More stations were also added to the line. It was renumbered as Train T-611 for the southbound (MA-NG) and Train T-612 for the northbound (NG-MA). Another Bicol Express train was serviced by the second version of the General Manager's train, a trainset based on modified CMC-300 series DMUs already operating in PNR service. This was numbered T-577.

Since then, the service was discontinued by 2006 after natural disasters inflicted serious damage to the tracks and bridges. Efforts to revive the service were unsuccessful. Since 2014, operations to the Bicol Region have been suspended. This is primarily because of typhoon damage to bridges. The PNR hoped to reopen the Bicol Express Service by about September 2014. Due to the damages brought by the Typhoon Rammasun (locally named Glenda), PNR announced that the Bicol Express' resumption of services would be further delayed until October and November 2014. Since then, the resumption of service has been repeatedly announced and then cancelled, most recently in late 2016. This was mostly because of an inadequacy of train coaches, the remoteness of the areas covered by the rail tracks, and the necessity of more extensive railway repairs, which has rendered the railways towards Tutuban and back impassable.

The return of train services to Bicol is planned with the construction of the South Long Haul project.

==== Lucena Express ====
The Lucena Express was first opened in 1916 with a service between Malvar, Batangas and Aloneros in Guinayangan, Quezon. Later, the service was opened between Manila and Lucena. This train stopped at Blumentritt (San Lazaro), Santa Mesa, Paco, San Pedro, Biñan, Santa Rosa, Calamba, Los Baños, College, Masaya, San Pablo, Tiaong, Taguan, Candelaria, Lutucan and Sariaya stations. It was discontinued in 1942 during the Japanese occupation and was later integrated with the Bicol Express after the war.

==== Mayon Limited ====
The older Mayon Express Limited service was hauled by the newly-acquired MCBP class DMUs starting in 1973.

In March 2012, the Mayon Limited was resurrected and ran between Tutuban and Ligao. The train ran as Mayon DeLuxe on Monday, Wednesday and Friday from Tutuban as train T-713 with three air-conditioned carriages with reclining seats. The train returned on Tuesday, Thursday and Sunday as train T-714 from Ligao. On Tuesdays, Thursdays, and Sundays the train ran as Ordinary train (T-815) with non-reclining seats and cooling by fan. The departures for train T-816 were scheduled every Monday, Wednesday and Friday. The train did not run on Saturdays. The trains met at Gumaca.

Two types of DMUs were used for the service. The ordinary Mayon Limited services used KiHa 52 DMUs, while the Mayon Limited Deluxe used the KiHa 59 series DMUs, still with its original Kogane livery.

As of September 2013, all operations to the Bicol Region, including the Mayon Limited, have been suspended.

==== Manila Limited ====
The Manila Limited was a train service between Manila and Iriga. One train each left from these two termini. Train 517 left Manila by 3 pm and arrived in Iriga by 4:15 am. Train 518 left Iriga by 2:50 pm and arrived in Manila by 2:35 am. It ended in 2006 when all regular intercity services were terminated.

==== Prestige Express ====
The Prestige Express, also nicknamed the VIP Train by some rail enthusiasts of the time, was a limited express service from 1974 to 1981. It ran the full length of the South Main Line, only stopping at five stations in between. In Manila, it only stopped at the historic Paco station. Afterwards, it stopped at Lucena in Quezon, Naga in Camarines Sur, and in Daraga and Ligao in Albay. Like all services on the South Main Line, there were more stations added. The service was replaced by the shorter Peñafrancia Express in 1981 that ended at Naga.

The service used JMC-319 Luster, later MC-6366 Nikkō. It was a JMC class diesel multiple unit built by Tokyu Car Company in 1955 and refurbished in 1973 with a streamlined cab inspired by the likes of the 0 Series Shinkansen. PNR later removed the streamlined cone from the unit after an accident and the trainset was placed into service to serve the Bicol Express from 1998 to 2004. Since then, it has been withdrawn from passenger service and was relegated to track maintenance as inspection car IC-888. Although inactive and stripped of its motive power, there are no plans for the unit to be scrapped.

==== Peñafrancia Express ====
The PNR inaugurated the Peñafrancia Express between Manila and Naga City in 1981. It became PNR's premium intercity service and also had airline-style features such as pre-recorded background music, snacks, caterers, and stewardesses. Unlike the preceding Prestige Express, it did not have specialized rolling stock. It was primarily a choice between the acquired refurbished Nikko train acquired from the previous Prestige service, and later the 900 class locomotive and hauled ICF baggage cars and sleeper coaches built in Madras (now Chennai), India.

Initially, they were non-stop between Paco Station in Manila and Naga City, save for when the Peñafrancia Express trains headed in opposite directions and had to cross each other along the route in Quezon province. Later on, additional stops were added, mostly in the Bicol province of Camarines Sur with the train stopping in towns like Ragay, Sipocot, and Libmanan. This service ended by the late 1990s.

== Rolling stock ==
All locomotives, coaches and multiple units in active service with the PNR are being used on the South Main Line, as almost all PNR operations happen on Metro South Commuter, Shuttle Service, Inter-Provincial Commuter, and Bicol Commuter services.

As of 2022, the line uses diesel locomotives and multiple units, as well as passenger coaches built for the 1,067 mm (3 ft 6 in) Cape gauge. Its diesel locomotive fleet are predominantly GE Universal Series locomotives built between 1973 and 1992 by GE Transportation, the exception being 3 INKA CC300s which entered service in 2021. These are the 900, 2500 and 5000 classes. Not all GE locomotives are operational due to either being scrapped, destroyed during accidents or stored for rehabilitation.

Meanwhile, its multiple units and coaches are all built by Asian manufacturers. There are three distinct generations of active railcars:

- There are 18 PNR Hyundai Rotem DMU railcars, built by Korean firm Hyundai Rotem in 2009 and entered service the same year. Although built new in 2009, they had a longer service in PNR compared to ex-JR rolling stock as they were only acquired in the early 2010s. Not all sets are operational.
- The ex-JNR rolling stock such as the KiHa 35 and 59 DMUs, and the 203 series electric multiple units converted into locomotive-hauled cars. These were originally built in the 1960s and the 1980s and were handed over by JR East to the PNR between 2011 and 2015. The KiHa 52 sets are inactive as of 2020.
- The newest trains in PNR service are 37 railcars built by Industri Kereta Api (PT INKA) between 2018 and 2020. These include the 8000 class and 8100 class DMUs and the 8300 class coaches, all based on the INKA K3 coach design. The 8000 class and 8100 class DMUs entered service in 2019 and 2020, respectively, while the 8300 class coaches entered service in January 2021.

== Reconstruction ==
PNR South Luzon Railways Program
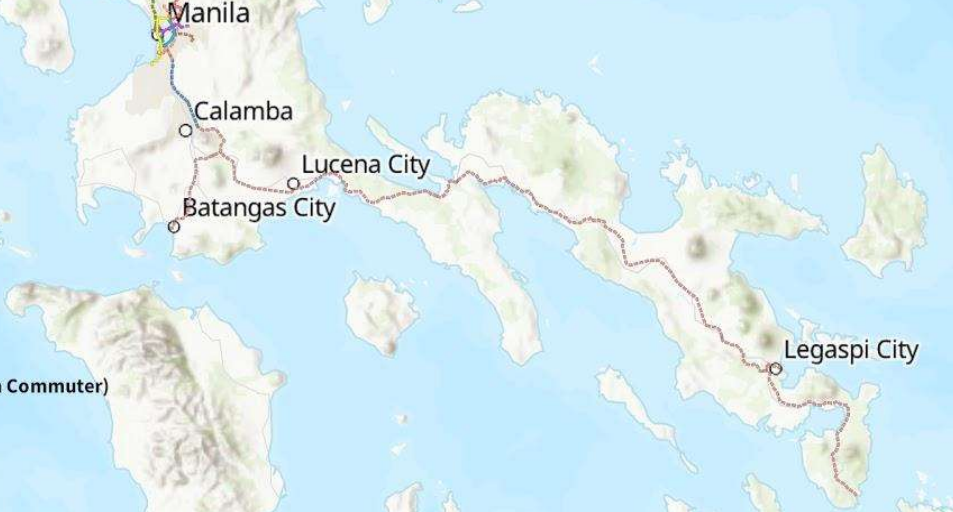
- Map of the new South Railways program, including NSCR South and PNR Bicol.

Overview
- Status: Under construction (NSCR); Pre-construction phase (SLH)
- Owner: Philippine National Railways
- Locale: Metro Manila; Calabarzon; Bicol Region
- Termini: Tutuban (NSCR) or Sucat (SLH); Calamba (NSCR) or Matnog (SLH)
- Stations: 54

Service
- Type: Urban rail transit (S-train) (NSCR); Inter-city rail (Higher-speed rail) (SLH)
- System: PNR Luzon
- Services: 8
- Operator: Philippine National Railways
- Daily ridership: 440,000 (Note: 340,000 for NSCR, 100,000 for PNR Bicol)

History
- Opened: June 26, 2022; 4 years ago (partial); 2032 (full; NSCR)

Technical
- Line length: 695 km (432 mi) (Note: 56 km (35 mi) for the NSCR and 639 km (397 mi) for the South Long Haul.)
- Track length: 751 km (467 mi)
- Number of tracks: Double-track (NSCR); Single-track with sidings (SLH)
- Character: Grade-separated
- Track gauge: 1,435 mm (4 ft 8 1/2 in) standard gauge
- Electrification: 1,500 V DC OHLE (NSCR)
- Operating speed: 160 km/h (99 mph)

The South Main Line will be reconstructed under the PNR South railways program that is part of the new Luzon Rail System (PNR Luzon). PNR Luzon is the proposed network of rail lines to be built on the island of Luzon. Two new lines that will use the South Main Line's right of way will be constructed. The first is the 56 km (35 mi) south section of the North–South Commuter Railway, an electrified double-track line connecting Metro Manila and Laguna to Central Luzon, which is served by the North Main Line. The second is the South Long Haul that leads to the Bicol Region.

=== NSCR South (South Commuter Railway Project) ===
A 56 km (35 mi) section of the South Main Line, currently used for the Metro Commuter service, will be reconstructed as part of the North–South Commuter Railway. This section of the line, referred to as NSCR South or PNR Calamba, will run between Tutuban to Calamba, and will connect with its northern counterpart at either Tutuban or Solis on the other end of the wye junction in Manila. The plan will also have interoperability between the Metro Manila Subway and the NSCR, with the subway trains extending services to Calamba. While the maximum speed of the system is 160 km/h (99 mph), the dense urban areas along this section will limit its maximum speed to 120 km/h (75 mph) and to 80 km/h (50 mph) at the underground section near Senate-DepEd station. The project was co-financed by the Japan International Cooperation Agency (JICA) and the Asian Development Bank (ADB), with construction beginning in July 2023. It expects full operations by 2032.

NSCR is an S-train-style urban rail transit system. It incorporates elements of commuter rail in terms of distance covered and higher maximum speed, as well as elements of rapid transit in terms of service frequency, right-of-way separated, rolling stock with longitudinal seating, and use of half-height platform screen doors. Limited-stop Commuter express services will use the same rolling stock as the regular commuter service but will stop at fewer stations. Finally, an Airport express service will enjoy the highest priority and will have its dedicated rolling stock being a limited express service.

A total of 464 electric multiple unit trainsets have been procured to operate on the line. 104 of these are 8-car EM10000 class trainsets that are based on JR East commuter stock such as the E233 series to be built by the Japan Transport Engineering Company (J-TREC). Another 404 commuter train cars will be built by J-TREC. As of 2023, the airport express trains are being procured after they awarded the contract.

There are also plans for the line to be extended to Batangas City to the south once the line itself achieves successful operations. This will occupy the old right-of-way of the Bauan line. Along with the northward extension to the north to Tarlac City, the line will have a total length of 220 kilometers (140 miles). The Batangas extension will be a different development from the South Long Haul as the two lines will not overlap, even in Metro Manila.

=== South Long Haul ===
The South Long Haul project, also known as PNR Bicol, was a project to rebuild the intercity line between Metro Manila and the Bicol Region. Originally proposed as a simple reconstruction of the existing network at narrow-gauge and a maximum speed of 75 kilometers (47 mi), the project now involves a complete overhaul of the railway and its conversion to standard-gauge, replacing the existing line. The line will be initially built as a single-track system. However, there are provisions for an upgrade to double-track or electrification in the future. Stations will be allowed to use passing sidings so that express train travel is uninterrupted.

The South Long Haul line in its present form is to be built between Sucat in Muntinlupa, southern Metro Manila, and Matnog station in Matnog, Sorsogon at the southeasternmost tip of Luzon. There will be two branch lines with the first is the Batangas branch. The branch will split between Los Baños and San Pablo stations in Laguna and will head towards the direction of Lipa, Batangas and will follow a new right of way, ending at Batangas International Port in Batangas City. The second branch will be the Legazpi line. It will be built from the new Daraga station located outside the poblacion of Daraga at which Phase 1 terminates, and will lead the existing right of way to Legazpi station in Legazpi, Albay.

Originally having a planned maximum speed 120 km/h (75 mph), revisions to the right-of-way were made and the maximum speed was increased to 160 km/h (99 mph) for express trains, comparable to higher-speed rail in other countries. This reduces overall travel time from the old Bicol Express of 14 to 18 hours to only a maximum of 4.5 hours to Legazpi, allowing the PNR to compete with air and highway travel.

To accommodate this many passengers, 64 passenger railcars were procured by the PNR in 2021. This would be arranged into 8-car trainsets similar to the NSCR, but are expected to be diesel stock due to the aforementioned lack of electrification on the line. This replaced a previous order of 9 diesel multiple unit cars from CRRC Zhuzhou Locomotive, which would have been arranged into 3-car trainsets. Diesel locomotives are also expected to be used as freight trains connecting various ports and inland facilities.

The project would have also rebuilt the remaining Metro South Commuter section between Tutuban and Sucat sometime after the line's completion by 2025. Newer narrow-gauge rolling stock are expected to remain in service due to them being the most recent stock in the PNR fleet. Its purpose is primarily for freight transport. For passenger services, it will also serve as a transport redundancy for the NSCR. Plans for a workaround with existing rolling stock are yet to be announced.

The project was initially planned to be funded through Chinese official development assistance, but was later withdrawn in 2023.
