= San Pedro station =

Railway station in San Pedro, Laguna, Philippines

San Pedro, Laguna
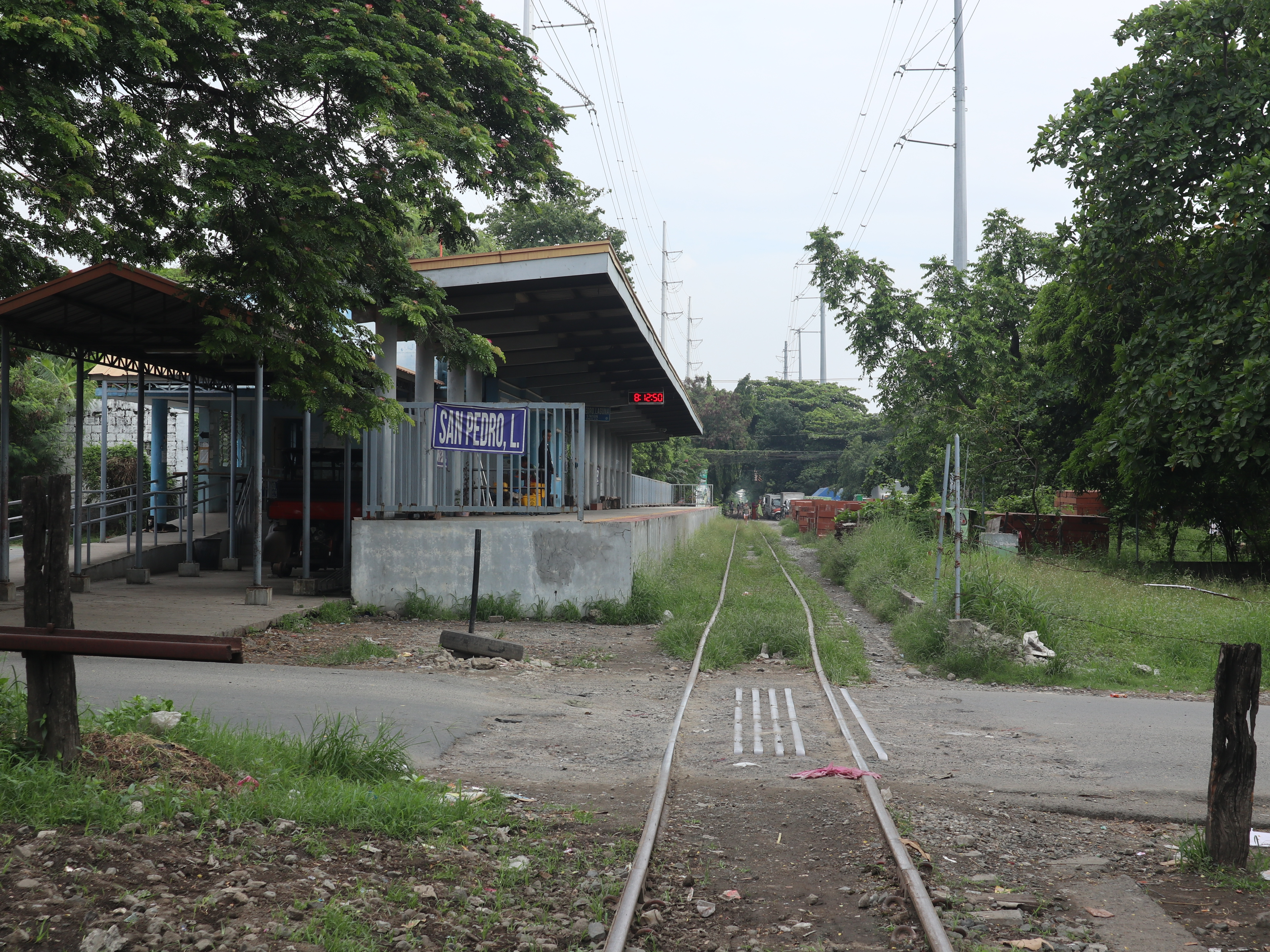
- San Pedro, Laguna Station in 2023

General information
- Location: G. Garcia Street, San Vicente (Former) (CP Garcia, San Pedro Laguna [Proposed]); San Pedro, Laguna; Philippines
- Coordinates: 14°21′42″N 121°03′19″E
- Owner: Philippine National Railways
- Operator: Philippine National Railways
- Lines: South Main Line; Planned: South Commuter; Former: Carmona
- Platforms: Side platforms
- Tracks: 3
- Connections: Jeepneys, buses, tricycles

Construction
- Structure type: At grade

Other information
- Station code: SPL

History
- Opened: August 1, 1908 (original); December 23, 2013 (new); October 5, 2016 (with commuter services)
- Closed: July 2, 2023
- Rebuilt: 2015
- Former names: San Pedro Tunasan

Services
Preceding station	PNR	Following station
Muntinlupa towards Tutuban	Metro South Commuter	Pacita Main Gate towards IRRI
Future services
Preceding station	PNR	Following station
Muntinlupa towards Clark International Airport	NSCR Commuter	Pacita towards Calamba
Muntinlupa towards Tutuban	NSCR Commuter	Pacita towards Calamba
Preceding station	Manila MRT	Following station
Muntinlupa towards East Valenzuela	Metro Manila Subway	Pacita towards Calamba
Location
- Location within Laguna Location within Luzon Location within Philippines

San Pedro station is a railway station located on the South Main Line in Laguna, Philippines.

Currently, there are two stations. The old one, now used as a PNR quarters, used to be the station where passengers can ride trains going to the Bicol region, to the former terminus of the Metro Manila Commuter in Biñan and Calamba stations, and to the former branch line towards Carmona station. It has 3 tracks. One track is the Main Line South, one is the spur line to Carmona, and the other is a loop siding.

In 2010, the tracks of the now abandoned Carmona Branch Line have been dismantled all the way to Carmona station, which was also the terminal of the line.

A new station was constructed in a nearby location near San Vicente Road and was opened in December 2013. As of 2013, there were 6 trips in San Pedro station, 2 northbound trips to Tutuban station and 1 trip southbound going to Santa Rosa station, 1 trip southbound going to Sta. Rosa in the afternoon, and 1 trip northbound going to Tutuban station and 1 last trip for the day going to Sta. Rosa in early evening.

As of October 2018, there were four trips in San Pedro station, two northbound trips to Tutuban, which is in the morning. Those train trips are known as Metro South Commuter Train #456 & #546. 456, which would originate from Mamatid, would arrive at San Pedro on 5:36 AM PHT (UTC+08:00). And 546, from Calamba station, would arrive exactly one hour later (6:36 AM). And two southbound trips from Tutuban station, which is the evening, known as Metro South Commuter Train #1837 and #1907. 1837, terminating at Calamba, would arrive at SPL on 8:11 PM, and 1907, terminating at Mamatid station, would arrive 30 minutes later (8:41 PM).

The branch line leading to Carmona is now a target for reconstruction in anticipation for revival of a shuttle service from Dela Rosa in Makati.

The station closed on July 2, 2023 to give way for the construction for the North-South Commuter Railway project. The station will be rebuilt into an elevated station with side platforms and would be slightly relocated from its original position.

== History ==
San Pedro, formerly known as San Pedro Tunasan, was opened on August 1, 1908 as part of the extension of the Main Line South from Muntinlupa to Calamba, Laguna. It became the first railway station serving the then-town of San Pedro.

The 1908 station was located at the place where the current San Pedro station stands today, but the station platform and building was located opposite of the platform and present station building and had three tracks. One was a refuge siding, one was a siding loop, and the last one was the Main Line. The old station was last renovated in 1972 for the launching of the Metro Manila Commuter Services led by President Ferdinand Marcos. It became the eastern terminus of the San Pedro–Carmona line from its opening in 1973 to its discontinuation in 2000s.

A new station with raised platforms, located west of the MRR counterpart of the station, was opened on December 23, 2013. For the reopening of commuter services to Santa Rosa, the station reopened on October 5, 2016.

The reopened station closed once again on July 2, 2023 to give way for the construction for the North-South Commuter Railway project. The station will be rebuilt into an elevated station with side platforms and would be slightly relocated from its original position.
