= DOST Hybrid Electric Train =

Train unit in the Philippines

Hybrid Electric Train
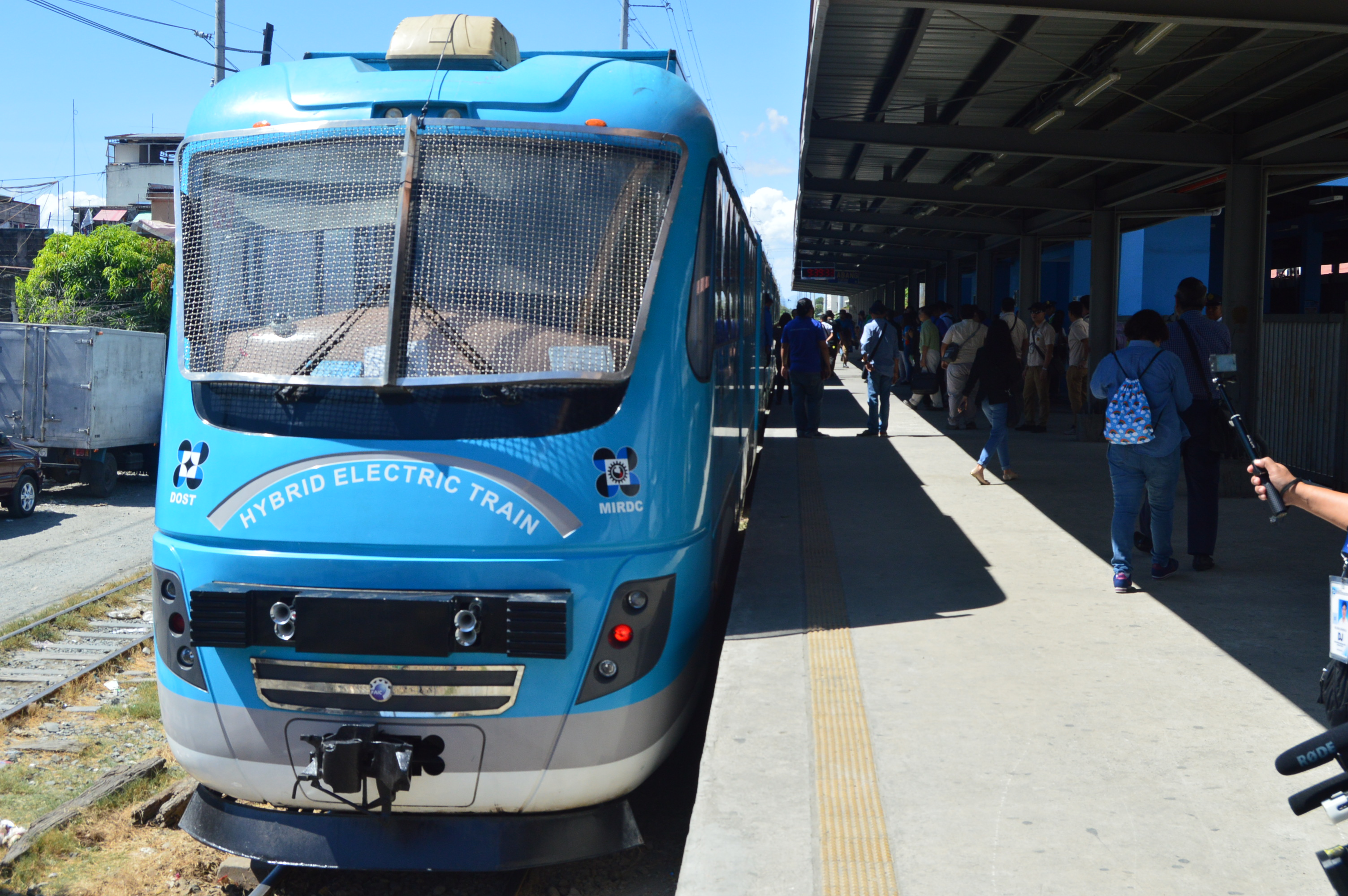
- The train at Alabang station in April 2019

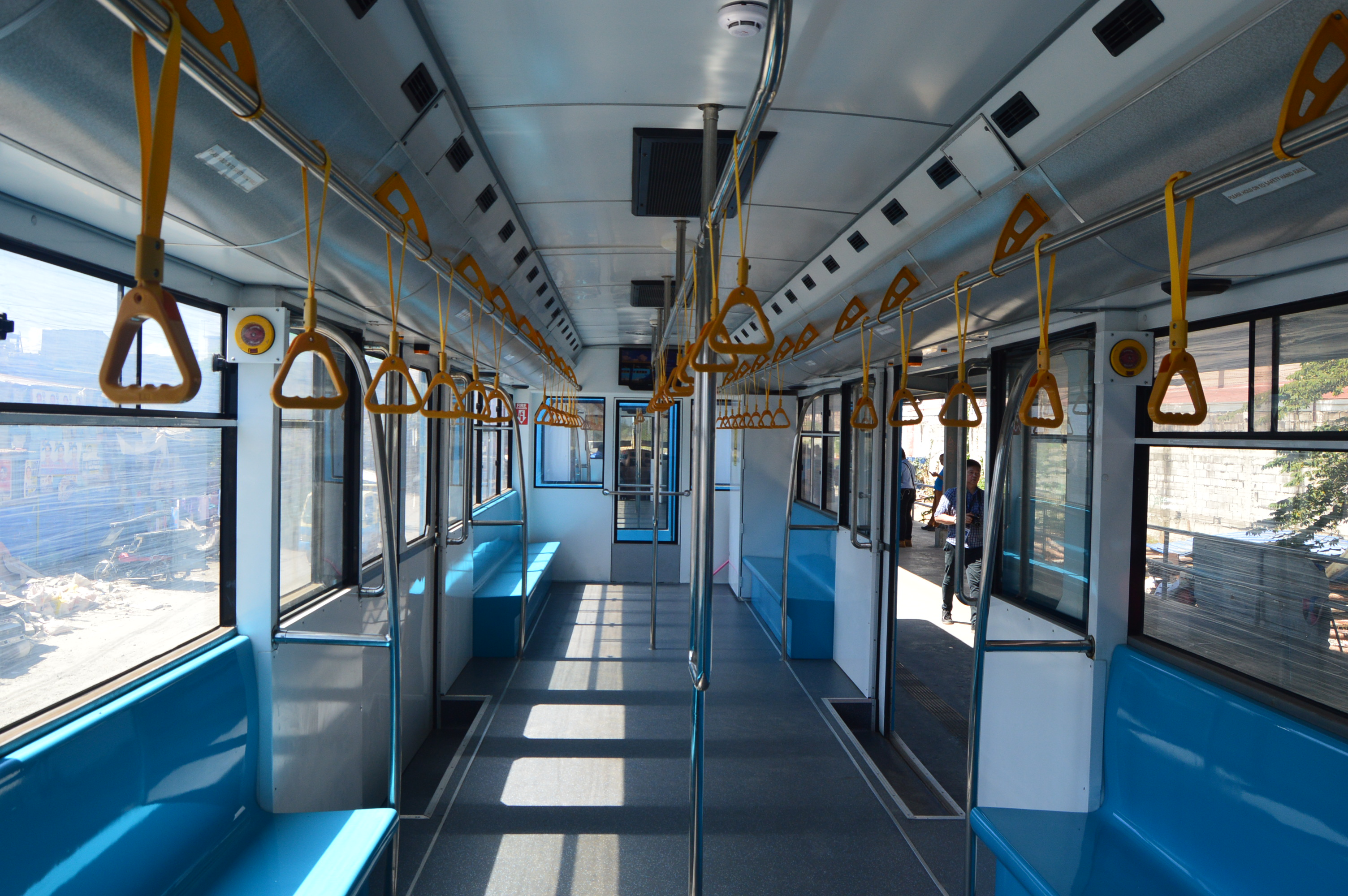
- Train interior in April 2019
- In service: 2018–2019 (Trial runs and free passenger rides); November–December 2021 (Loop Trial Runs and Free Passenger Rides)
- Manufacturers: Car body: Fil-Asia Automotive and Industries; Bodies: Sung-Shin Rolling Stock Technology Ltd
- Designer: DOST–MIRDC
- Built at: Metro Manila, Philippines
- Constructed: 2014–2015
- Entered service: May 6, 2019; 7 years ago (first commercial service)
- Number built: 5 non-articulated cars in 1 trainset (1 pilot car, 1 power car, 3 passenger cars)
- Formation: Tc-T-T-T-Mc
- Capacity: Design load: 175 passengers per car Crush load: 220 passengers per car
- Operator: DOST → Philippine National Railways
- Depot: Caloocan depot → Calamba station
- Line served: PNR Metro Commuter Line

Specifications
- Car body construction: Structure: Mild steel Frame interior: Galvanneal steel Carbody shell: Fiberglass reinforced plastic
- Train length: 60,000 mm (196 ft 10 in)
- Car length: 12,000 mm (39 ft 4 in)
- Width: 2,850 mm (9 ft 4 in)
- Height: 4,432 mm (14 ft 6.5 in)
- Doors: 2 double-sliding doors on each car
- Maximum speed: 80 km/h (50 mph) (computed)
- Weight: 25.5 t (56,000 lb)
- Steep gradient: 1.2%
- Power output: 930 kW (1,250 hp)
- Transmission: Hybrid diesel-electric
- Power supply: 440V diesel genset and 12V x 260 lead-acid batteries
- Bogies: Sung-Shin outside-oriented H-frame bogies, 2 per car
- Minimum turning radius: 50 m (160 ft)
- Braking system: Regenerative
- Safety system: Automatic train stop
- Coupling system: In-between cars: Semi-permanent couplers Trainset ends: Automatic couplers
- Track gauge: 1,067 mm (3 ft 6 in)

Notes/references
- Specs are based from the paper by DOST-MIRDC.

The Hybrid Electric Train (HET) is a hybrid electric train built by the Department of Science and Technology's Metals Industry Research and Development Center.

It is the first train crafted and designed locally by Filipino engineers with parts imported from abroad. It was officially turned over to the Philippine National Railways on June 20, 2019.

== Background ==
The development of the Hybrid Electric Train (HET) is a project of the Metals Industry Research and Development Center (MIRDC) of the Philippine Department of Science and Technology in partnership with the Philippine National Railways (PNR).

The Hybrid Electric Train project began in 2012, and the designing of the train commenced in the following year. The bidding process took place in 2013, with the manufacturing taking place from 2014 to 2015. The project was introduced to the public in June 2016.

The train was developed by ten Filipino engineers and technicians from MIRDC led by head engineer Pablo Acuin.

== Specifications ==
The Hybrid Electric Train is a hybrid electric vehicle powered by electricity and diesel. It has 260 lead acid batteries which is used to run the train and operate its automatic doors, air-conditioning and CCTV systems. It can be converted to utilize lithium battery. It also makes use of regenerative braking technology.

The trainset has five non-articulated cars measuring 12 m (39 ft 4 in) long, 2.85 m (9 ft 4 in) wide, and 4.432 m (14 ft 6.5 in) high with one double-sliding doors on each side of each car, which can carry 220 passengers each at 50 kilometers per hour (31 mph). Four of its cars serve as passenger coaches with one having a driver's cabin, while the other car not mentioned solely serves as a generator car that also includes a driver's cabin.

The train also has an automatic stop safety feature that would activate in an event of a strong earthquake.

The MIRDC contracted local bus and truck manufacturer Fil-Asia Automotive and Industries Corp. to build the train. Fil-Asia in turn outsourced the motor, chassis, engine, motor, axle, and wheels from outside of the Philippines to be able to manufacture it.

The trainset formation is Tc-T-T-T-Mc in which one of the two cabs are the power cars. The Tc car is described as a pilot car, the T cars are described as passenger cars, and the Mc car is described as a power car.

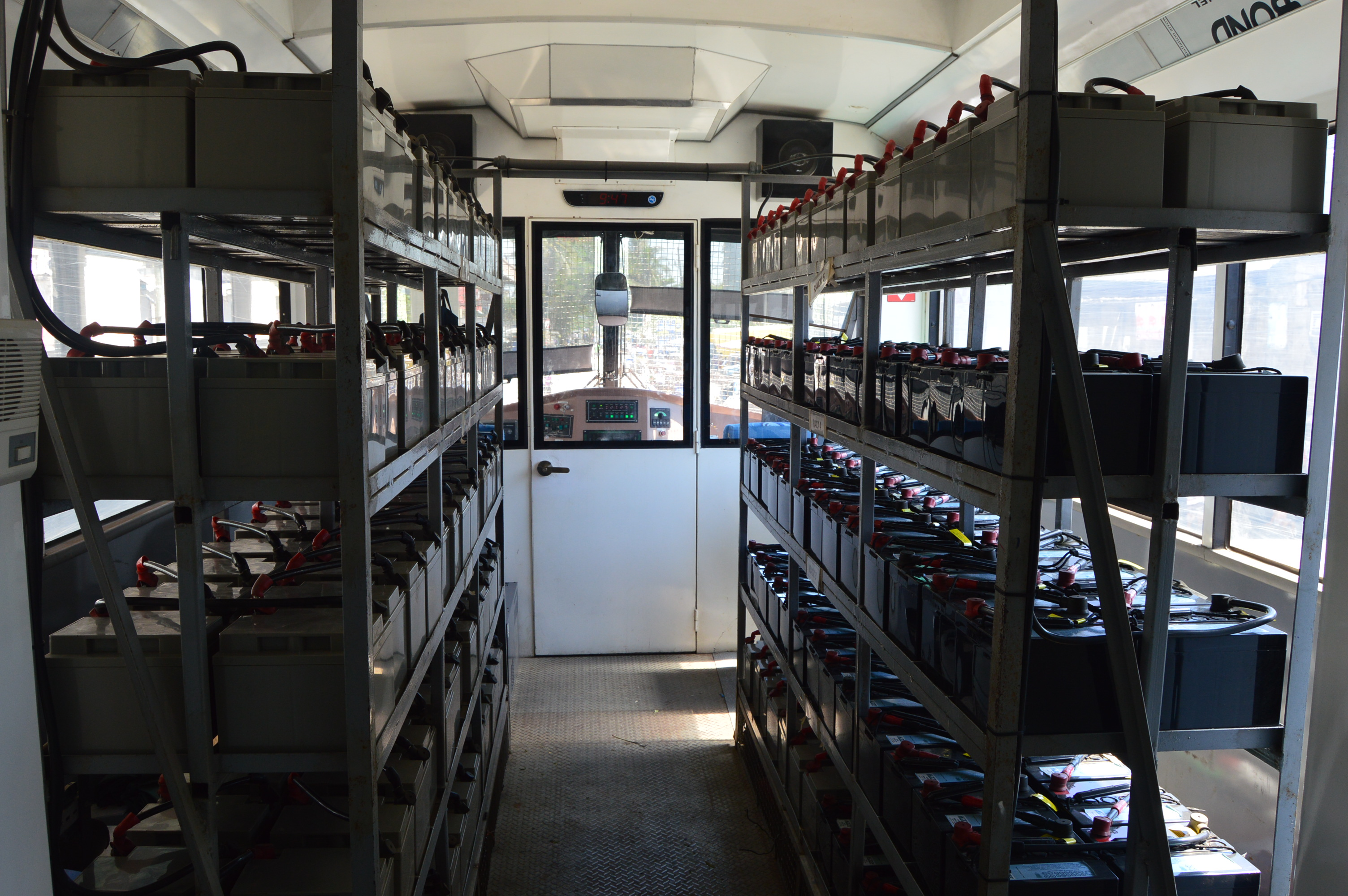
The power car with lined-up 260 batteries.

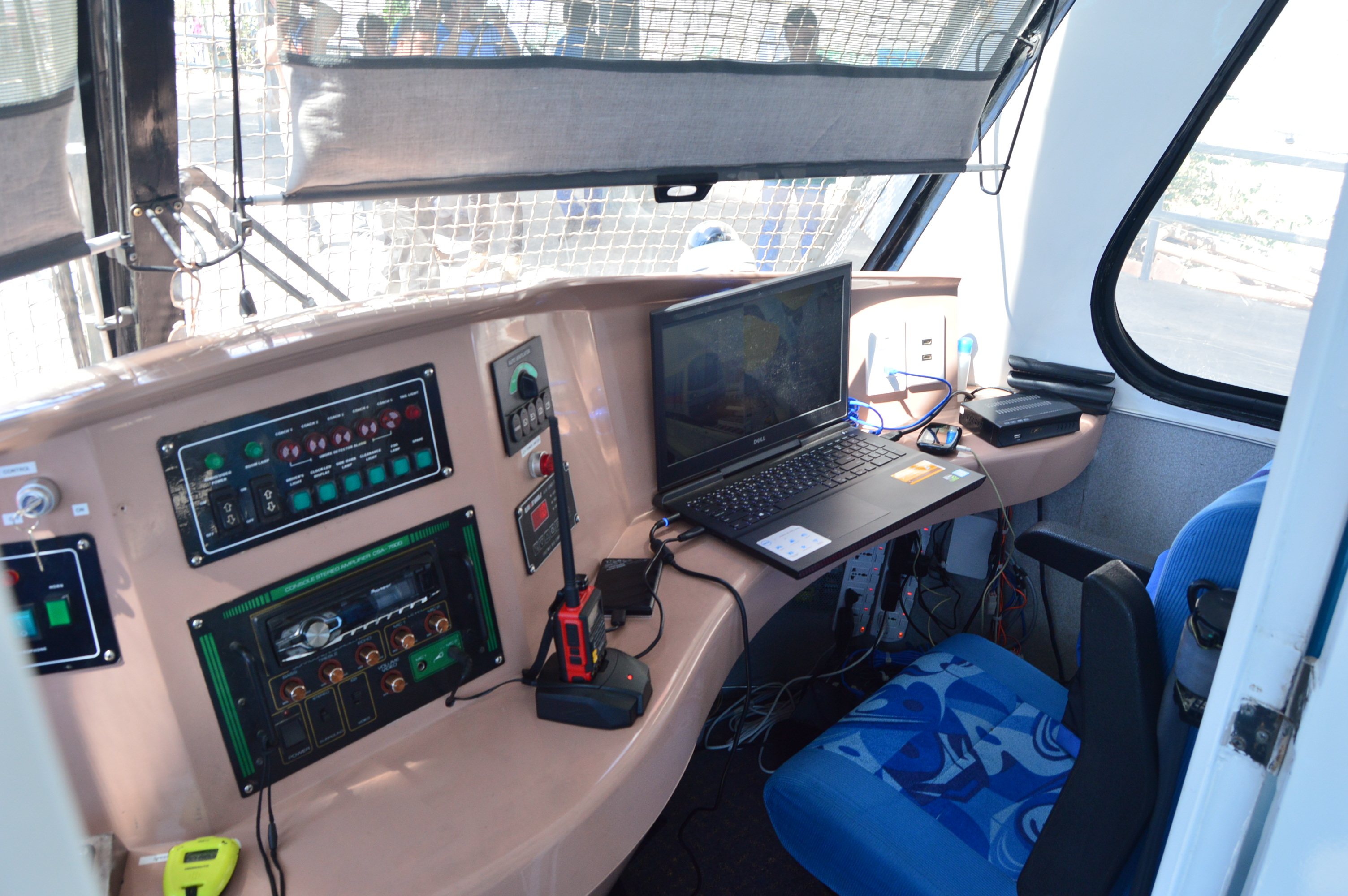
Driver control panel

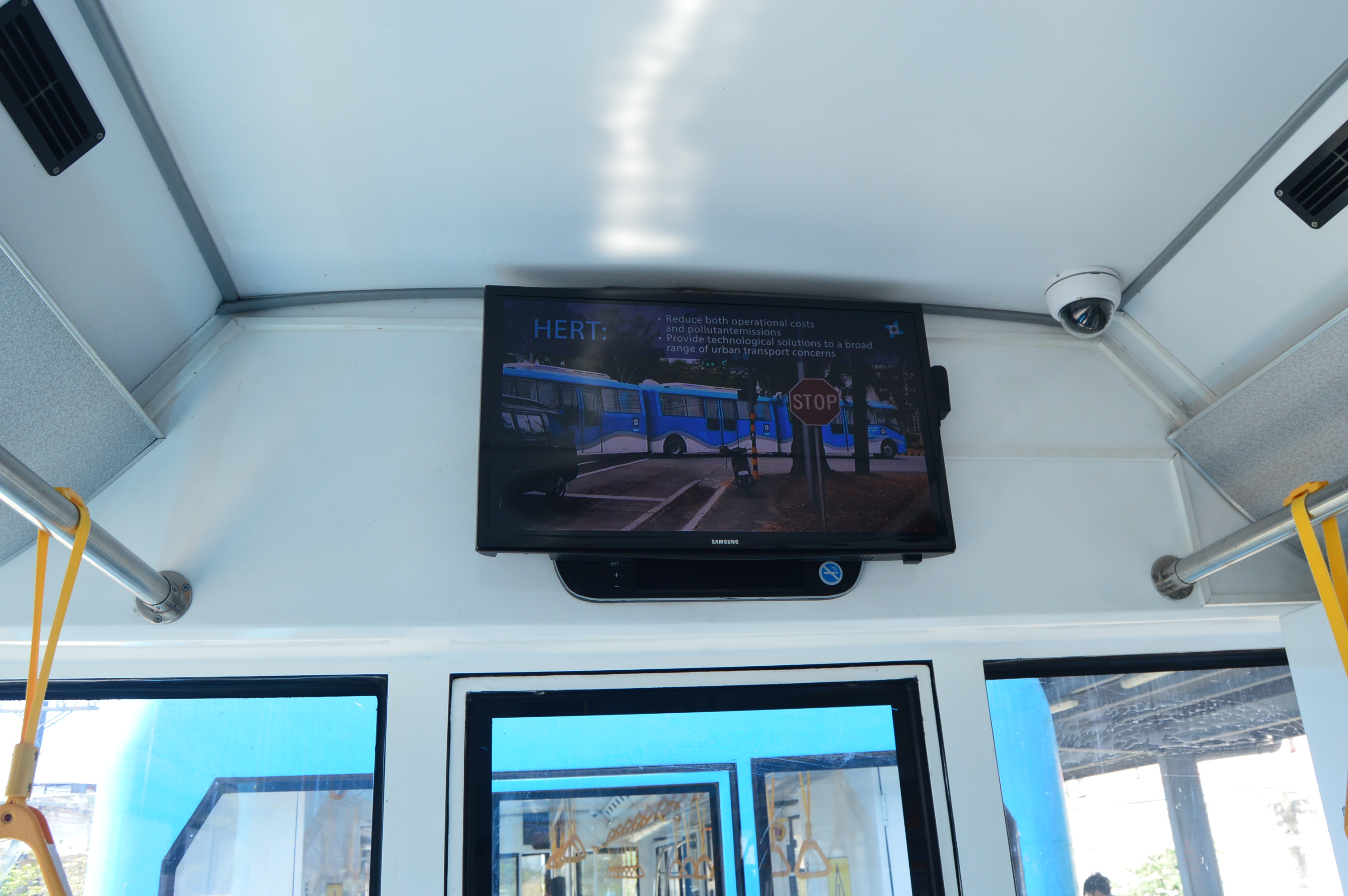
Information screen and CCTV inside the train

== Operational history ==
Trial runs of the Hybrid Electric Train was conducted in July 2018. The first commercial operations of the Hybrid Electric Train began on May 6, 2019, where it served the Alabang-Calamba Line thrice a day. The train was officially turned over to the Philippine National Railways on June 20, 2019. After a brief hiatus in service, the train returned to service on November 11, 2021 for free rides between Biñan and Calamba stations. The free rides ended on December 3, 2021, and the hybrid electric train has not made any known public appearances afterwards, making seldom test runs since then. It was last publicly seen conducting test runs from Calamba to San Pablo in 2023.

=== Future ===
According to DOST Secretary Fortunato de la Peña, the DOST will find private sector firms that will manufacture the rolling stock of the HET before Rodrigo Duterte ends his term as President in 2022.

== See also ==
- DOST Hybrid Electric Road Train
- Media related to DOST Hybrid Electric Train at Wikimedia Commons
