= Muntinlupa station =

Railway station in Metro Manila, Philippines

Muntinlupa
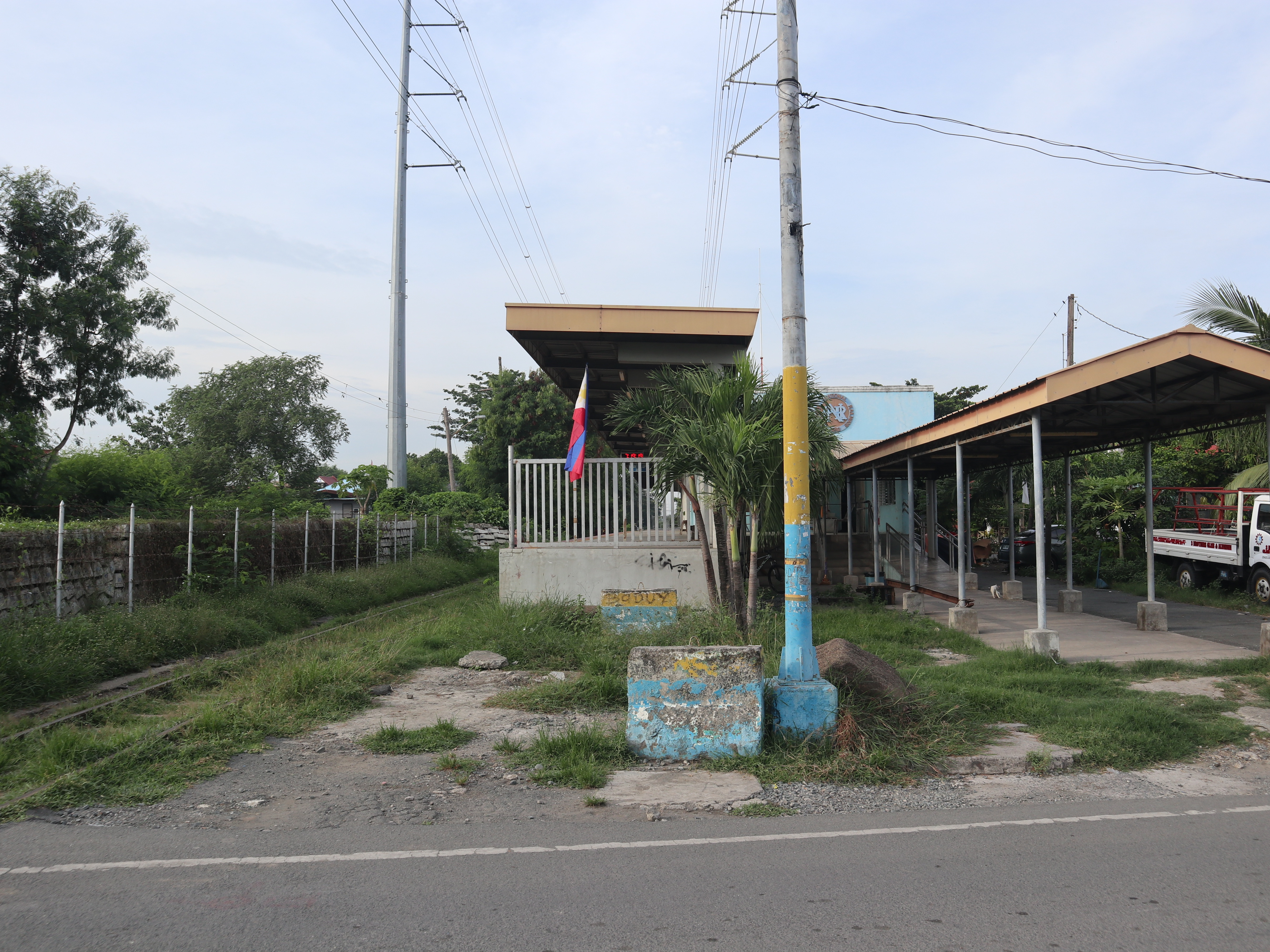
- Muntinlupa station in 2023.

General information
- Location: Rizal Street, Poblacion; Muntinlupa, Metro Manila; Philippines
- Coordinates: 14°23′22″N 121°02′51″E
- Owner: Philippine National Railways
- Operator: Philippine National Railways
- Lines: South Main Line; Planned: South Commuter
- Platforms: 1
- Tracks: 1

Other information
- Station code: MP

History
- Opened: June 21, 1908
- Closed: July 2, 2023
- Rebuilt: December 23, 2013

Services
Preceding station	PNR	Following station
Alabang towards Tutuban	Metro South Commuter	San Pedro towards IRRI
Future services
Preceding station	PNR	Following station
Alabang towards Clark International Airport	NSCR Commuter CIA–Calamba	San Pedro towards Calamba
Alabang towards Tutuban	NSCR Commuter Tutuban–Calamba	San Pedro towards Calamba
Alabang towards Clark International Airport	Commuter Express CIA–Calamba	Santa Rosa towards Calamba
Alabang towards Tutuban	Commuter Express Tutuban–Calamba	Santa Rosa towards Calamba
Preceding station	Manila MRT	Following station
Alabang towards East Valenzuela	Metro Manila Subway	San Pedro towards Calamba
Location

Muntinlupa station is a railway station located on the South Main Line in Muntinlupa, Metro Manila, Philippines. The old station was removed together with the I.S. during the clearing operations in 2009. The new station was supposed to be constructed years earlier which was within the proposed Phase 2 of the Northrail-Southrail Linkage Project that should have rehabilitated and double tracked the South Main Line from Sucat to Calamba. The new station's construction started and got finished only in 2013 without the track duplication of the line. The new station was formally opened on December 23, 2013. This station is planned to be the new terminus of the Metro Commuter although there is no confirmation and no specific date yet given by PNR.

The station is the seventeenth station southbound from Tutuban and is one of three stations serving Muntinlupa, the others being Sucat, Alabang and previously Tunasan.

The station closed on July 2, 2023 to give way for the North-South Commuter Railway project. The station would be rebuilt as an elevated station with a side platform and would be relocated slightly from its original position. The station was demolished on September 18, 2025, as part of the simultaneous dismantling of 10 PNR stations between Sta. Mesa, Manila and Cabuyao, Laguna, ordered by acting Department of Transportation Secretary Giovanni Lopez to fast-track the construction of the North–South Commuter Railway.
