= Cabuyao station =

Railway station in Laguna, Philippines

Cabuyao
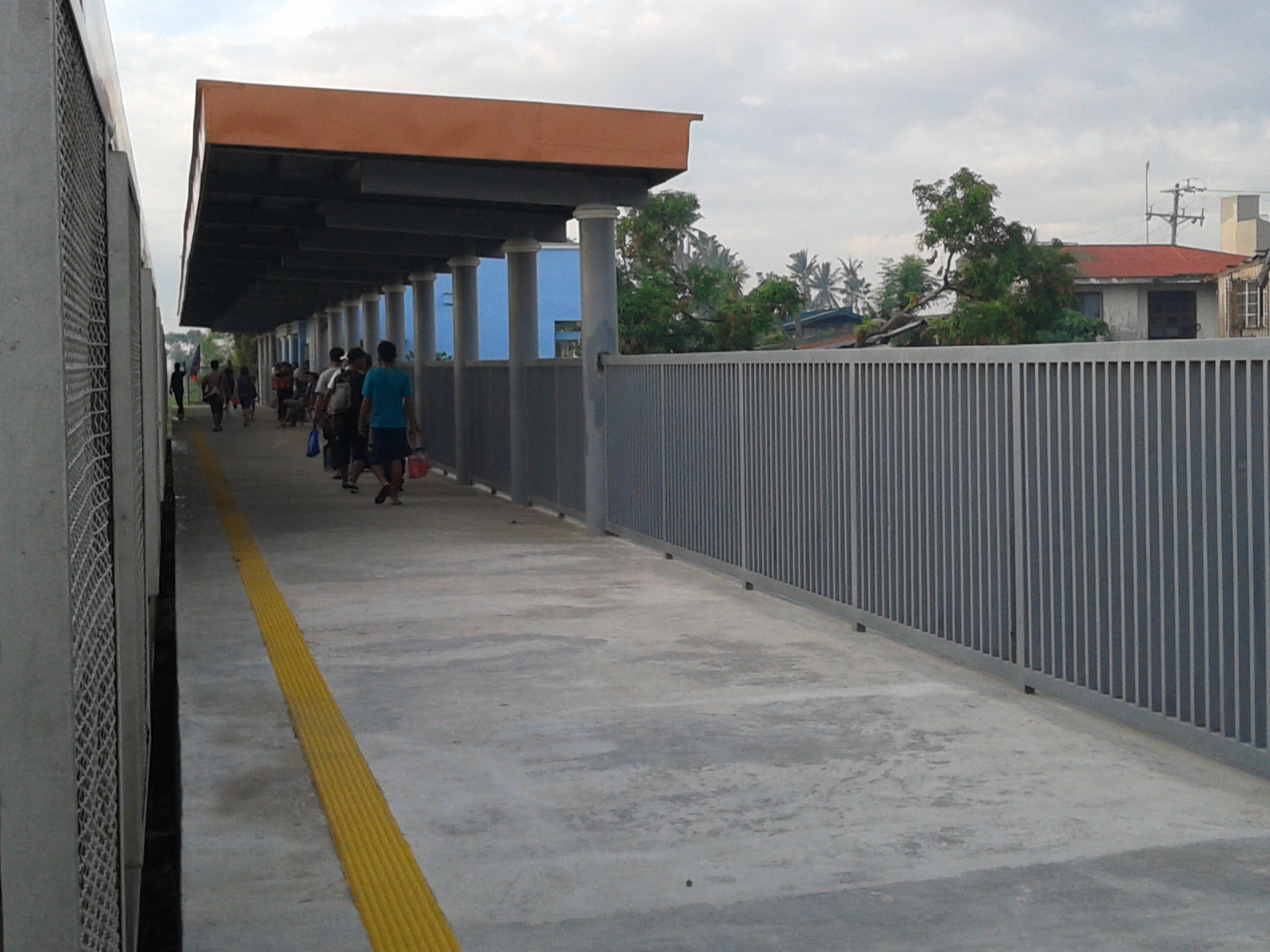
- Platform area of Cabuyao station

General information
- Location: Felix Limcaoco Street, Poblacion I Cabuyao, Laguna; Philippines
- Coordinates: 14.2800°N 121.1262°E
- Owner: Philippine National Railways
- Operator: Philippine National Railways
- Lines: South Main Line; Under-construction: South Commuter
- Platforms: Side platforms
- Tracks: 2

Construction
- Structure type: At-grade

Other information
- Station code: AO

History
- Opened: November 7, 1908
- Rebuilt: April 28, 2014

Services
Preceding station	PNR	Following station
Santa Rosa towards Tutuban	Metro South Commuter	Mamatid towards IRRI
Future services
Preceding station	PNR	Following station
Santa Rosa towards Clark International Airport	NSCR Commuter CIA–Calamba	Calamba Terminus
Santa Rosa towards Tutuban	NSCR Commuter Tutuban–Calamba	Calamba Terminus
Santa Rosa towards Clark International Airport	Commuter Express CIA–Calamba	Calamba Terminus
Santa Rosa towards Tutuban	Commuter Express Tutuban–Calamba	Calamba Terminus
Preceding station	Manila MRT	Following station
Santa Rosa towards East Valenzuela	Metro Manila Subway	Calamba Terminus
Location
- Location within Laguna Location within Luzon Location within Philippines

Cabuyao station is a railway station located on the South Main Line in Laguna, Philippines.

== History ==
Cabuyao station was opened on 7 November 1908 on the South Main Line.

Cabuyao station is part of the Alabang–Calamba segment that was closed starting in 2023 to prepare for the construction of the Clark–Calamba Railway. As of 2024, the rail tracks were dismantled while the station is kept intact.

== Nearby landmarks ==
Cabuyao station is located at the city center of Cabuyao. Major landmarks nearby include the city public market, the city public schools, St. Polycarp Parish, Savemore Market, and Asian Institute of Technology, Sciences and the Arts.

== Transportation links ==
Cabuyao station is primarily accessed by foot and served by tricycles. Jeepneys ply on the poblacion's main street a few hundred meters away, connecting commuters to other towns in Laguna from Calamba, Biñan, to San Pedro.
