= PNR Metro Commuter Line =

Commuter rail line in the Philippines

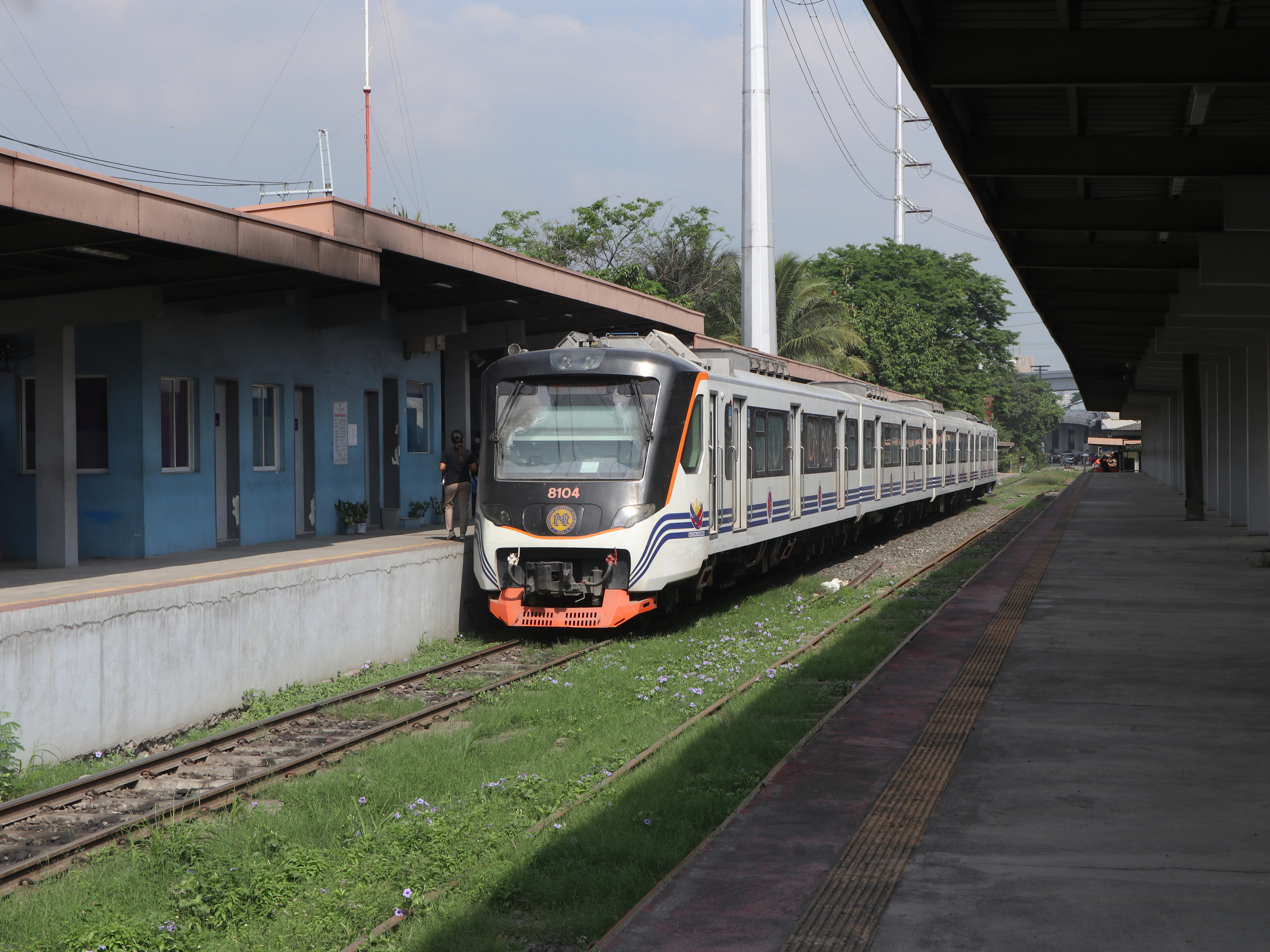
- A PNR 8100 class at Santa Mesa station in March 2024 on its last day of operations

Overview
- Other names: Metro North Commuter; Metro South Commuter
- Status: Closed
- Owner: Government of the Philippines
- Locale: Metro Manila
- Termini: Tutuban; Governor Pascual (Note: Metro North Commuter only.) Alabang (Note: Metro South Commuter only.) Calamba (until July 2, 2023)
- Continues as: PNR North Main Line; PNR South Main Line
- Stations: 36
- Website: pnr.gov.ph

Service
- Type: Commuter rail
- Services: 2
- Operator: Philippine National Railways
- Depot(s): Tutuban; Caloocan
- Rolling stock: Refer to Rolling stock section below
- Daily ridership: 22,790 (2022)
- Ridership: 8.2 million (2022)

History
- Opened: April 6, 1970; 56 years ago
- Closed: March 27, 2024; 2 years ago

Technical
- Line length: 75.7 km (47.0 mi)
- Track length: 107.2 km (66.6 mi)
- Number of tracks: Double-track (Governor Pascual–Sucat); Single-track (Sucat–IRRI)
- Character: At-grade
- Track gauge: 1,067 mm (3 ft 6 in)
- Electrification: None
- Operating speed: 20–40 km/h (12–25 mph)
- Signalling: Mitsui ABS (1977–2009); None (2009–2024)
- Average inter-station distance: 2.1 km (1.3 mi)

The PNR Metro Commuter Line was a commuter rail line operated by the Philippine National Railways. It was first inaugurated as the Metro Manila Commuter Service in 1970 and originally served the North Main Line and the South Main Line, as well as the defunct Carmona and Guadalupe branch lines. Since then, it adopted several names such as Metrotrak and Metrotren, before its present name was adopted in the late 2000s. The line was also nicknamed the Orange Line due to its designation in the 1970s.

The line had 36 stations serving Metro Manila and Laguna. It was divided into two sections which met at Tutuban station in Tondo, Manila. The Metro North Commuter section ran from Tutuban to Governor Pascual station in Malabon and was colored light green on the system map of PNR. On the other hand, the Metro South Commuter section ran from Tutuban to IRRI station in Los Baños, Laguna and was colored orange on the system map of PNR. Some stations connected to LRT Line 1 and 2, and MRT Line 3.

The line ceased operations on March 28, 2024, to give way for the construction of the North–South Commuter Railway Extension Project (NSCR-Ex). Despite this, plans are underway to reinstate its tracks at a later date following the completion of the NSCR.

== History ==
=== Manila Railroad local trains and Meralco Tranvias ===
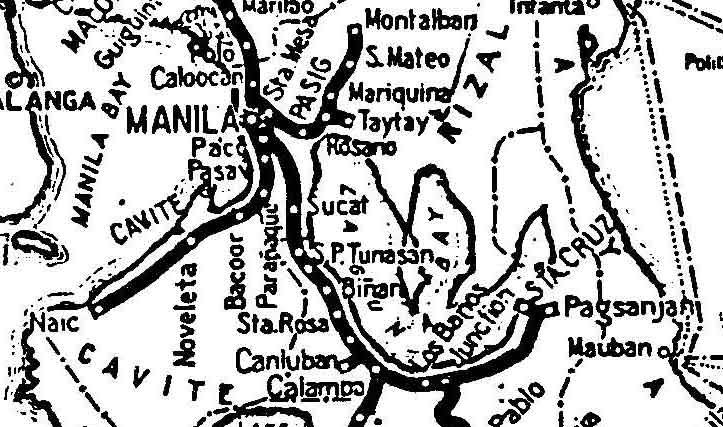
A map of the Manila Railroad Company's local train network.

The Manila Railroad Company, which preceded PNR, operated various local trains between Manila and its neighboring provinces. Trains from Tutuban will lead to Naic in Cavite, Pagsanjan in Laguna, Montalban in Rizal, and Bulacan during the 1920s.

The Manila Electric Railroad and Light Company (Meralco) also operated electrified Tranvia services in what is now Metro Manila. The 100 km (62 mi) tram system reached Malabon to the north, Pasig to the east, and Libertad (now part of Pasay) to the south, making it one of the longest in Asia in 1924. Both systems were heavily damaged during the Battle of Manila in World War II.

=== Previous commuter services ===
==== Metro Manila Commuter Service (1970–89) ====
The Metro Manila Commuter Service started on April 6, 1970, which started at Manila North Harbor and ended in Biñan, Laguna. During this decade, more stations were opened although some were either closed or relocated. In 1976, the commuter system peaked and extended as far north as San Fernando, Pampanga, Guadalupe (located in Mandaluyong on the other side of Pasig River) to the east, and College to the south. There were also services in the now-defunct Carmona branch line.

==== Metrotren (1989–2009) ====
In 1990, the system was undergoing renovations under the working title Metrotrak. By May of that year, the system was inaugurated as Metrotren to distinguish it from the LRT Line 1, then named "Metrorail". However, the Metrotren system eventually suffered neglect due to lack of funding and maintenance. Plans for expansion and rehabilitation such as the Manila–Clark Rapid Railway System project and Guadalupe line revival was also never realized. Another proposal to rehabilitate the line, the Manila–Calabarzon Express was planned but did not succeed.

Plans for an elevated expressway was conceived as the Pabahay sa Riles Tollway, a 16-kilometer (9.9 mi) route that would run above the railway tracks, and it would have partly competed with Metro Manila Skyway Stage 3.

=== Metro Commuter ===
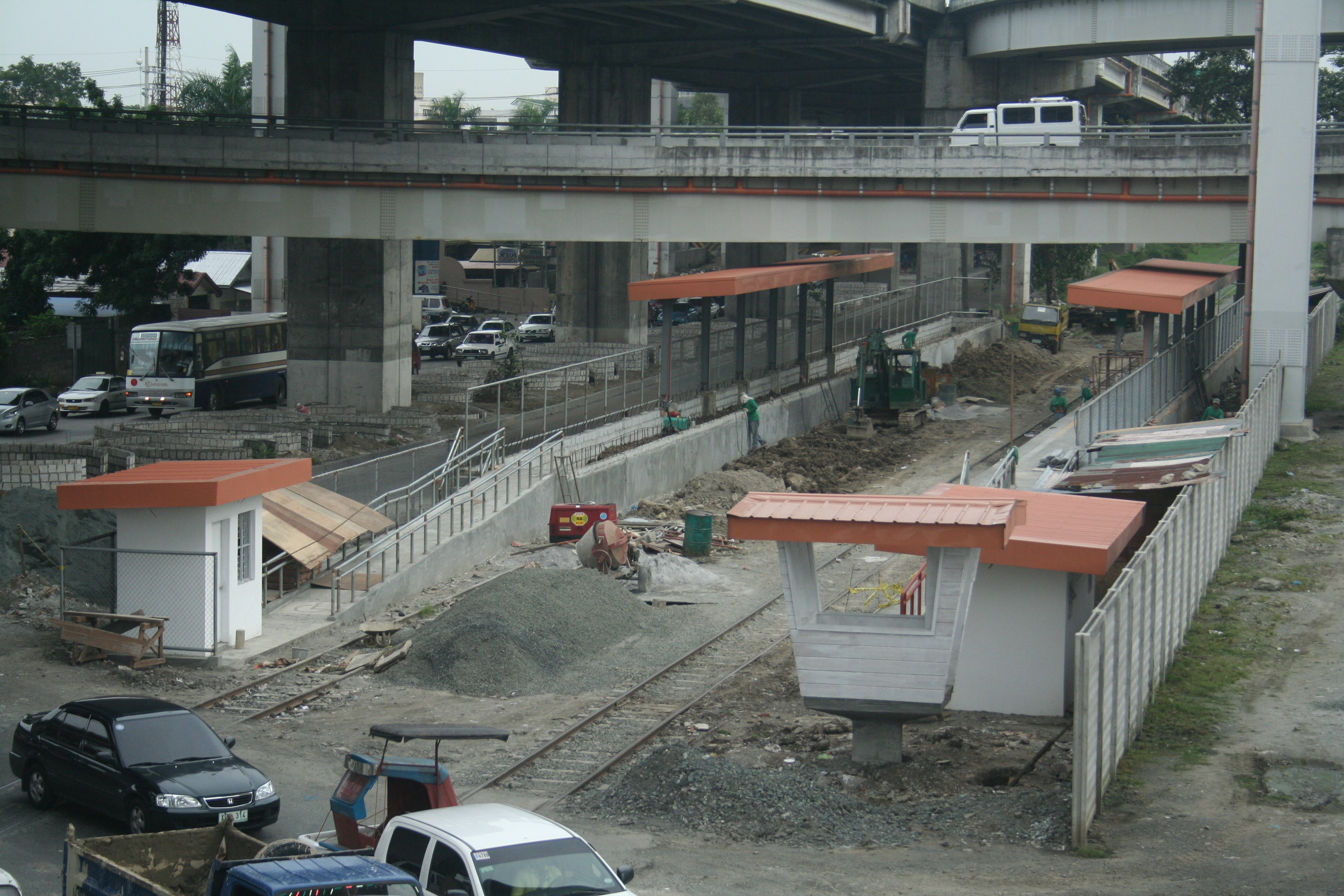
Construction of Nichols station in Taguig, 2009

The Arroyo administration attempted to modernize the PNR system by rebuilding the lines and purchasing new rolling stock. PNR purchased 6 brand new diesel multiple units from South Korea and became its first order in 35 years.

A complete rehabilitation of the line was initiated as the Northrail–Southrail Linkage. The project was financed by the Export–Import Bank of Korea and the Korean Economic Development Cooperation Fund and was completed in 2010. The government was also interested in reviving commuter rail services to the north via the Northrail project. However, the line stopped construction in 2011 and only pillars were built. PNR also acquired second-hand multiple units from Japan as stopgap measures to its train fleet, ending the Metrotren era. However, services were further suspended to Santa Rosa in 2014, and to Alabang in 2015 due to safety issues and accidents on the line. The North Main Line has also been closed.

After nearly 20 years, PNR reopened the Metro North Commuter line, and launched the Caloocan–Dela Rosa shuttle line, on August 1, 2018. This would be followed by a steady expansion and reintroduction of rail services to the north, currently reaching to Malabon, which has not seen rail activity for nearly 20 years. In 2017, the Department of Science and Technology announced its first Filipino-designed train and started trial services between Alabang and Calamba in 2018. Services to Los Baños, Laguna via IRRI station were reopened in December 2019.

In 2018, PNR acquired three diesel-hydraulic locomotives, 15 coaches, and six sets of diesel multiple units from Indonesian rolling stock manufacturer Industri Kereta Api (INKA). The INKA trainsets and 5 of the Hyundai Rotem DMUs comprise a 14-train fleet that will replace the aging PNR 900 class as well as the second-hand rolling stock, as these trainsets were planned to be transferred to the Bicol Region for the Bicol Commuter services after 2020.

On February 16, 2023, DOTr announced the suspension of operations of the PNR system in Metro Manila for five years, along with the Metro Commuter services, to give way for the construction of the North–South Commuter Railway. The closures, initially expected to start by May 2023, began on July 2, 2023, with the suspension of the Alabang–Calamba route. The rest of the railway line temporarily closed on Maundy Thursday, March 28, 2024, with the last day of operations on the day before. The closure would fast-track the construction of the new railway line by eight months and save ₱15.18 billion in costs. Current trainsets were transferred to operating services in Southern Luzon. The present line will also be rebuilt during and after the construction of the North–South Commuter Railway as it will serve as an alternate transport mode to the NSCR.

== Route ==
Map of PNR Metro Commuter Line services before temporary closure

The Metro Commuter Line is predominantly aligned and shares the path of the PNR South Main Line which uses a dedicated right of way of its own. Prior to the line's closure, it terminated at Calamba Station despite having rails further towards Legazpi, Albay, but few trains stop at Sta. Rosa and Calamba Stations further to the south. Inter-provincial services such as the Bicol Express and Mayon Limited are not running as of 2015 but plans to revive the services have been presented.

Legend

- Trains stop at stations marked "●".
- Trains pass those marked "｜".
- Only morning and evening trains stop at stations marked "◇".
- Morning and evening trains stopping only on Sundays at stations marked "X".
- Evening southbound trains only load at stations marked "♦".
- Morning and evening trains only unload at stations marked "♠".
- For AA-LA-IRRI, some trains stop at stations marked ∆, while all trains stop at stations marked ✓
- closed stations
- MSC (TU-LA) — Metro South Commuter (Tutuban to Calamba)
- MSC (TU-IRRI) — Metro South Commuter (Tutuban to IRRI)
- MSC (AA-LA-IRRI) — Metro South Commuter (Alabang-Calamba- IRRI)
- MNC (TU-GP) — Metro North Commuter (Tutuban to Governor Pascual)
- MNC (GP-FTI) — Metro North Commuter (Governor Pascual to FTI)
- SS (TU-SU) — Shuttle Service (Tutuban to Sucat)
- SS (SA-SU) — Shuttle Service (Santa Mesa to Sucat)
- PT — Premiere Train

Name	Distance (km)			Services								Transfers	Location
Name	Between stations	From Tutuban	From Governor Pascual	Metro Commuter					Shuttle		PT	Transfers	Location
Name	Between stations	From Tutuban	From Governor Pascual	MSC (TU-LA)	MSC (TU-IRRI)	MSC (AA-LA-IRRI)	MNC (TU-GP)	MNC (GP-BIC)	SS (TU-SU)	SS (SA-SU)	PT	Transfers	Location
Valenzuela	—	—	—				—	—				none	Valenzuela
Governor Pascual	1.300	6.400	0.000				●	●				none	Malabon
Caloocan	0.800	5.100	1.300				●	●				none	Caloocan
10th Avenue	1.460	4.300	2.100				●	●				none	Caloocan
5th Avenue	1.380	2.840	3.560				●	●				none	Caloocan
Solis	1.460	1.460	4.940				●	●				none	Manila
Tutuban	—	0.000	—	●	X		●	｜	●		●	Tutuban	Manila
Blumentritt	2.730	2.730	5.530	●				●	●		●	Blumentritt	Manila
Laon Laan	1.090	3.820	6.620	●				●	●		｜	none	Manila
España	0.700	4.520	7.320	●				●	●		●	none	Manila
Santa Mesa	1.970	6.490	9.290	●				●	●	●	●	Pureza	Manila
Pandacan	1.470	7.960	10.760	●				●	●	●	｜	none	Manila
Paco	1.500	9.460	12.260	●				●	●	●	｜	none	Manila
San Andres	0.960	10.420	13.220	●				●	●	●	｜	none	Manila
Vito Cruz	0.600	11.020	13.820	●				●	●	●	｜	none	Manila
Buendia	1.260	12.280	—	●				｜	●	●	●	none	Makati
Dela Rosa	0.120	12.400	15.200	●	♦			●	｜	｜	｜	none	Makati
Pasay Road	0.940	13.220	16.140	●	♠			●	●	●	●	none	Makati
EDSA	1.080	14.300	17.220	●	♠			●	●	●	●	Magallanes	Makati
Nichols	3.600	17.900	20.820	●	♠			●	●	●	｜	none	Taguig
FTI	0.700	18.600	21.520	●	♦			●	●	●	｜	none	Taguig
Bicutan	2.300	20.900	23.820	●	♦			●	●	●	｜	none	Parañaque
Sucat	4.120	25.020	—	●	♦				●	●	●	none	Muntinlupa
Alabang	3.673	28.693	—	●	♦	∆					●	none	Muntinlupa
Muntinlupa	3.320	32.013	—	◇	◇	∆					｜	none	Muntinlupa
Tunasan	—	—	—	—	｜	｜						none	Muntinlupa
San Pedro	3.361	35.374	—	◇	◇	∆					●	none	San Pedro, Laguna
Pacita Main Gate	2.176	37.550	—	◇	◇	∆					｜	none	San Pedro, Laguna
Golden City 1	1.170	38.720	—	◇	◇	∆					｜	none	Biñan, Laguna
Biñan	1.044	39.764	—	◇	◇	∆					●	none	Biñan, Laguna
Santa Rosa	4.042	43.806	—	◇	◇	∆					●	none	Santa Rosa, Laguna
Golden City 2	1.954	45.760	—	｜	｜	｜						none	Santa Rosa, Laguna
Cabuyao	1.660	47.420	—	◇	◇	∆					｜	none	Cabuyao, Laguna
Mamatid	5.530	52.950	—	◇	◇	∆					●	none	Cabuyao, Laguna
Banlic	1.850	54.800	—	｜	｜	｜						none	Cabuyao, Laguna
Calamba	1.338	56.138	—	◇	◇	✓						none	Calamba, Laguna
Pansol	4.490	60.628	—		◇	✓						none	Calamba, Laguna
Masili	1.899	62.257	—		◇	✓						none	Calamba, Laguna
Los Baños	2.382	64.909	—		◇	✓						none	Los Baños, Laguna
College	2.172	67.081	—		◇	✓						none	Los Baños, Laguna
IRRI	2.253	69.334	—		◇	✓						none	Los Baños, Laguna
Stations in italics are either under construction, not yet operational, or have been closed.

The line was open from 4:29 a.m. PHT (UTC+8) until 9:42 p.m. on a daily basis. It operated almost every day of the year unless special schedules were announced. During Holy Week, a public holiday in the Philippines, the line is closed for annual maintenance, owing to fewer commuters and traffic around the metro. Normal operation resumed after Easter Sunday.

== Existing infrastructure ==
=== Station layout ===
All stations are at-grade, with most stations using a side platform layout. Most have only basic amenities, platforms and ticket booths. Rehabilitated stations along the Metro Manila line have been fitted with ramps for passengers using wheelchairs. Several stations have extended platforms, having an upper platform catering to DMU services, and a lower platform for regular locomotive-hauled services. As of August 2017, most of the stations are being extended and equipped with platform-length roofing, better ticketing office, and restrooms.

=== Signalling ===
An automatic block signalling system by Mitsui was employed in the line as stated in a 1977 magazine by the International Railway Journal. However, a presentation published in 2015 by the Department of Transportation and Communications stated that there is no signalling in the line.

On November 16, 2021, PNR published the bidding documents for the design, installation, and commissioning of the signalling, interlocking, and level crossing systems for the 29-kilometer (18 mi) Metro South Commuter section between Tutuban and Alabang. The contract was awarded to PT Len Railway Systems of Indonesia in April 2022, and the contract was signed on May 19. PT Len Railway Systems will supply their SiLSafe 4000 computer-based interlocking system. The project was expected to be completed within 16 months after the contract signing, or until September 2023. However, these plans were never made, likely due to the construction of the North-South Commuter Railway in 2024.

=== Communications ===
Prior to the upgrade, the communications system backbone consisted of VHF radios, augmented with land and mobile phones. It was a localized system with no repeater stations. From 2020 to 2022, the communications system was digitalized and computerized. In 2020, the PNR tapped Hytera to upgrade the system's communication system to a two-way radio system. The TETRA digital radio system, which is currently being used in the line, enables faster coordination in depot personnel and has a network management system, allowing tasks to be centralized and handled seamlessly. The upgrade was completed in February 2022.

=== Tracks ===
The tracks are built to the 1,067 mm (3 ft 6 in) narrow gauge. The existing tracks are ballasted, with the rails laid on wooden and concrete railroad ties. The existing tracks consist of 37-kilogram-per-meter (75 lb/yd) rails.

== Rolling stock ==
The PNR Metro Commuter Line has always used diesel-powered rolling stock since the services were opened in 1970. In 1976, PNR was able to expand its commuter and regional services when it bought 60 CMC railcars which remained in service until 2004. These commuter trainsets however deteriorated in the 1990s and ordered second-hand 12 series coaches in their stead. The 12 series cars were hauled by PNR's diesel locomotives which were previously used in its intercity and freight services. There were no new orders until 2009 when PNR ordered the Hyundai Rotem DMUs, followed by second-hand multiple units and coaches from Japan.

PNR later ordered 2 new trains from Indonesian manufacturer PT INKA on January 22, 2018, followed by an order of 7 more trains on May 28, increasing the total trains ordered to 9. The DOST Hybrid Electric Train also entered trial service the same year. The agency then commenced the refurbishment of its entire fleet the following year, which introduced polycarbonate windows that can resist stoning as well as a new livery.

Locomotives:

- DEL: Diesel-electric
- DHL: Diesel-hydraulic

Railroad cars:

- C: Coach
- HEP: Head end power car
- S: Sleeping car

Multiple units:

- BEMU: Battery electric multiple unit
- DMU: Diesel multiple unit

=== Active ===
Locomotives
Class	Image	Type	Maximum speed		Number built	Number in service	Year	Remarks
Class	Image	Type	mph	km/h	Number built	Number in service	Year	Remarks
900		DEL	64	103	21	6	1973, 1979, & 1991	Remarks
900		DEL	64	103	21	6	1973, 1979, & 1991	Originally a class of 21 locomotives, 6 are active, 1 is inactive, 2 are under rehabilitation, 4 were stored in Caloocan Workshop, and 8 were scrapped.
9000		DHL	75	120	3	1	2019–2020	The latest locomotive of PNR. 2 units were reallocated at the Bicol Commuter Line (Naga - Sipocot, v.v., and Naga - Ligao, v.v.)

Coaches
Class	Image	Type	Maximum speed		Number built	Number in service	Formation	Year	Remarks
Class	Image	Type	mph	km/h	Number built	Number in service	Formation	Year	Remarks
203 series		HEP	60	100	40 units (8 sets)	20 units (4 sets)	5	1982–1986	Former JR East electric multiple units acquired in 2011.
203 series		C	60	100	40 units (8 sets)	20 units (4 sets)	5	1982–1986	Former JR East electric multiple units acquired in 2011.
8300		C	75	120	15 units (3 sets)	4 units (1 set, 5th car removed)	5	2019–2020	The latest passenger coaches of PNR. 2 sets were reallocated at the Bicol Commuter Line (Naga - Sipocot, v.v., and Naga - Ligao, v.v.)

Multiple Units
Class	Image	Type	Maximum speed		Number built	Number in service	Formation	Year	Remarks
Class	Image	Type	mph	km/h	Number built	Number in service	Formation	Year	Remarks
Hyundai Rotem		DMU	50	80	18 units (6 sets)	3 units (1 set)	3	2009	Servicing the Metro North Commuter.
8100		DMU	60	100	16 units (4 sets)	12 units (3 sets)	4	2019–2020	These units are derived from the Indonesian K3 coaches, which also includes the 8300 class of locomotive-hauled railcars. The 8100 class services the Metro South Commuter.

=== Former ===
Locomotives
Class	Image	Type	Maximum speed		Number built	Year	Remarks
Class	Image	Type	mph	km/h	Number built	Year	Remarks
5000		DEL	64	103	10	1991	Originally a class of 10 units, 6 were stored in Caloocan Workshop, 1 are inactive, & 3 are active. 5001 is a yard shunter at the Caloocan Workshops, 5007 is used as a yard shunter, and 5009 is used as a Bicol Commuter hauler.
2500		DEL	64	103	43	1965, 1966, 1976, & 1979	Originally a class of 43 locomotives, 1 unit is active situated in Naga and painted in orange in late 2020.

Coaches
Class	Image	Type	Maximum speed		Number built	Formation	Built	Remarks
Class	Image	Type	mph	km/h	Number built	Formation	Built	Remarks
7A/12 (ja)		C	60	100	30	4–6	1970–77	Acquired 1999 to replace some of the CMC fleet. Decommissioned by 2012 after the 203 series-derived coaches have replaced them.

Multiple Units
Class	Image	Type	Maximum speed		Units	Formation	Built	Remarks
Class	Image	Type	mph	km/h	Units	Formation	Built	Remarks
Nikkō		DMU			26	2–3	c. 1974	Initially arranged in two-car trainsets, the class served commuter trains in the 1970s. Transferred to Peñafrancia Express intercity services between Manila and Naga. Has since been decommissioned in 2004.
CMC		DMU	59	95	60	2–10	1976	Last units were retired in 2004 with some units transferred to PNR's maintenance equipment. Most of them have been scrapped in 2009.
KiHa 52		DMU	59	95	7	3–4	1963–1966	3 units were painted in Orange, while 4 units were painted in Blue livery. 3 orange sets were used for MSC service from 2013 to 2014 and 2017. 1 unit (Kiha 122) was used for MNC operations from 2018 to 2019 then in 2020, it was refurbished as a rescue train.
KiHa 350		DMU	59	95	6	2	1960s	2 units (1 set) is used as a Bicol Commuter train.
8000		DMU	60	100	6 units (2 sets)	3	2018–2019	Currently serves the Interprovincial Commuter Line (Calamba - San Pablo, v.v., and San Pablo - Lucena, v.v.)

== Services ==
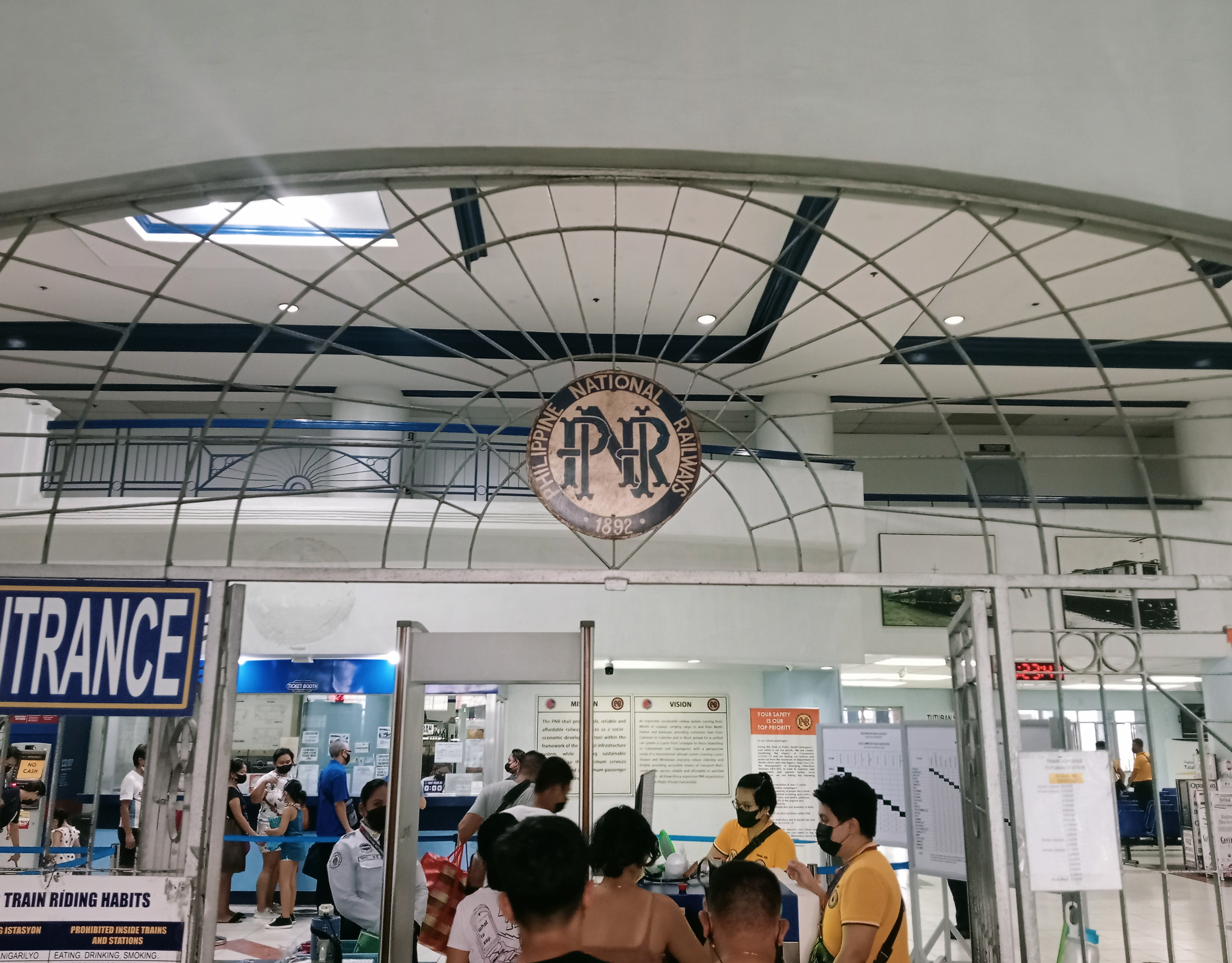
Passenger entrance at PNR Tutuban Station

=== Metro South Commuter ===
The Metro South Commuter (also known as MSC) was the main and only train service currently being offered by PNR that run along the Metro Commuter Line. The trains that were used for this service are the 900 and 2500 class diesel-electric locomotives, ex-Joban Line 203 series EMUs donated by JR East, the South Korean Hyundai Rotem DMUs, the PT INKA INKA 8100 class DMUs, and the INKA CC300 locomotives and 8300 class coaches. The trips are reduced upon announcements. On December 2, 2014, the new Calamba Station was inaugurated. Later that night, the MSC1907 was extended up to the said station. The MSC1937 was also extended, but only up to Santa Rosa Station.

On July 2, 2023, regular MSC services were cut short to Alabang, following the closure of the line to Calamba. Services were stopped entirely on March 27, 2024.

=== Metro North Commuter ===
On August 1, 2018, Philippine National Railways reinstated commuter train services to Caloocan station. The line was reopened after repairs due to water intrusion. According to claims by the Department of Transportation, it will be the most efficient way of travel between Caloocan and Makati. Services were to continue operating until the completion of the NSCR, after which the line will be mostly dedicated to freight transport. Originally running from 10th Avenue to Dela Rosa, it was upgraded into the Caloocan-FTI shuttle service on September 10 (officially called the Sangangdaan-FTI shuttle service). On December 3, 2018, it was again extended to Acacia/Governor Pascual station, with plans to extend the service up to Valenzuela railway station, and poised to carry 120,000 passengers daily if completed.

Trains servicing the Metro North Commuter service from Governor Pascual to FTI and vice versa usually stop at limited stations. Since 2019, trains servicing the MNC services stopped at all stations. A single Hyundai Rotem diesel multiple unit served this route. Services are currently suspended to make way for the North–South Commuter Railway (NSCR) construction.

=== Past services ===
Prior to the establishment of the PNR Metro Commuter Line, the Manila Railroad had several local train services in the 1950s and 1960s. According to a timetable that was effected on August 16, 1954, local trains on the South Main Line from Manila reached Lucena station in Quezon province. In the 1960s, local trains also reached San Fernando, Pampanga on the North Main Line. Services on the South Main Line were also added in the province of Laguna, and reached San Pablo and Santa Cruz, Laguna.

==== Caloocan–Meycauayan section ====
After the intercity section of the North Main Line was closed in the 1980s, then-president Corazon Aquino inaugurated the resumption of commuter rail services to Meycauayan in Bulacan on May 10, 1990. It was part of the Metrotren program initiated by then-Department of Transportations and Communications secretary Oscar Orbos to revitalize Metro Manila's public transport infrastructure due to worsening car traffic in the metropolis. The line was closed in the midst of the 1997 Asian financial crisis. There were plans to revitalize the entire line and extend it to Laoag.

A section of the line was opened in 2018 from Solis to Governor Pascual. This section eventually became the PNR Metro North Commuter. The network shall extend again to Valenzuela City once a bridge crossing the Tullahan River has been constructed. However, the NSCR will serve as the primary commuter rail service to Bulacan and neighboring Ilocos Norte, with the PNR Metro North Commuter allotted as an alternative to the NSCR. No plans are made yet to build a MNC ground level station.

==== Carmona Line ====
A spur line towards Carmona was opened on April 1, 1973, to serve the residents of the San Pedro–Carmona Resettlement Project. On September 11, 1976, two Rail Commuter services were designated on the line and were named after indigenous flora. The service from Carmona to Manila was called Ilang-Ilang while the returning service was called Sampaguita. The Carmona services ended by early 2005. The closure coincided with court cases filed in 1996 against the Philippine National Railways by private corporations that owned some of the right-of-way and was ruled out in 2008, as PNR continued to own the tracks. Parts of the line remain intact, and plans to reopen the line are underway.

==== Shuttle Service ====
The Shuttle Service was introduced on January 27, 2014. This service uses Hyundai Rotem DMUs and JR KiHa 52. There are 4 routes of the Shuttle Service, where trains stop at all stations along the routes.

1. Tutuban – Sucat
2. Sucat – Tutuban
3. Sta. Mesa – Sucat
4. Sucat – Sta. Mesa

This train service was removed last May 23, 2014 to give way to maintenance servicing of the rolling stock. Another reason was the 3 consecutive weeks of delays and cancellations of some train trips. The service officially returned to the line on August 1, 2018, this time, to serve from the 10th Avenue railway station up to the Dela Rosa station using a JR KiHa 350 DMU. An additional service was opened on September 10 and operated from the reopened Caloocan station to FTI station. It is now the PNR Metro North Commuter.

==== Premiere Train ====
The Premiere Train was a special MSC service that operates from Monday to Friday, except holidays. The train being used in this special service was the KiHa 59 "Kogane" train set, which is also from Japan. The train used to stop at selected stations only, namely Tutuban, Blumentritt, España, Sta. Mesa, Buendia, Pasay Road, EDSA (flagstop), Sucat, Alabang, San Pedro, Biñan, and Santa Rosa. The service had 4 trips: MSC501, MSC702, MSC1555, and MSC1802.

It was first opened in March 2014, but it only ran from Tutuban to Santa Rosa. In May 2014, Kogane was replaced by 203 series EMU coaches due to high passenger demand. The service now stops at all stations and ran from Mondays to Saturday.

It was then extended to Mamatid, then to Calamba.

The service was suspended in December 2014 due to the inauguration of the station building of Calamba, and due to the repairs of the trainset being used for this service.

==== IRRI services (Metro South Commuter) ====
===== Tutuban/Dela Rosa-IRRI =====
On December 1, 2019, Train services to the International Rice Research Institute inside the campus of the University of the Philippines Los Baños were started. Five new stations were added to the route: Pansol and Masili in Calamba Laguna, and Los Baños, college and IRRI in the neighboring town of Los Baños.

The service uses the Kogane train set previously used for Premiere Train Services. The service originates from Tutuban exclusively on Sundays, while it starts from Dela Rosa from Monday to Saturday. The train only loads a limited number of passengers in Dela Rosa, FTI, Bicutan, Sucat and Alabang Stations when going southbound, but unloading in stations in between like Nichols and EDSA are allowed.

The service ended in 2020 following the COVID-19 pandemic.

===== Alabang-Calamba-IRRI =====
On December 16, 2019, Regular Commuter services between Alabang, Calamba and IRRI were launched. The service uses Kiha-350 DMUs and runs the full route thrice daily from both endpoints and twice from the Calamba-IRRI segment. The service ended in 2020 following the COVID-19 pandemic.

== Fares and ticketing ==
The PNR Metro Commuter Line used a distance-based fare system. Prior to its closure, the rail operator charged ₱1.07 per kilometer. The minimum fare is ₱15.00. Fares are rounded up in multiples of ₱5.00. Fares are 20-percent lower for passengers of non-air-conditioned trains. Additionally, senior citizens and persons with disability are given 20-percent discount.

PNR issues paper tickets manually. Passengers caught without tickets, or short-ticketed, are charged the farthest distance fare of the service.

== Incidents and accidents ==
The PNR Metro Commuter Line has been prone to numerous incidents, including stoning incidents, people being run over by trains (including even fatal ones), and trains colliding with vehicles.

- On May 19, 2014, a cigarette vendor died while six others were hurt when a PNR train from Tutuban Station collided with a jeepney across the railroad tracks along G. Tuazon Street in Sampaloc, Manila at around 4:30 p.m. The jeepney was dragged around 50 meters (160 ft) from the site of the collision. The driver of the jeepney was allegedly drunk when the collision happened.
- On April 29, 2015, a Hyundai Rotem DMU derailed between EDSA railway station and Nichols railway station. There were 80 reported injuries, mostly minor cases. The incident was caused by missing parts of the railtracks that were stolen. This, however, prompted PNR operations to be suspended on May 5, 2015, to conduct safety tests by PNR and TÜV Rheinland. The operations of the PNR resumed on July 23, 2015.
- On January 12, 2016, a PNR Metro South Commuter Line train from Alabang collided with a jeepney at the Pedro Gil Street crossing near Paco station in Paco, Manila. One person died from head injuries and six were injured.
- On July 7, 2017, five people, including a pregnant woman, was hurt when an ambulance was hit by a train (a PNR 900 class locomotive and a 203 series EMU) near Blumentritt Station in Manila. The ambulance, which came from Barangay 167 Ilano in Caloocan, was on its way to a hospital to bring the pregnant woman when the accident occurred.
- On January 14, 2018, a passenger in a 203 series trainset forced a train door open while the train was moving.
- On October 11, 2019, an old woman got run over by a train, causing injuries to her hands and legs.
- Fourteen stoning incidents were reported from December 2 to 21, 2019, including a stoning incident in one 8000 class train.
- On December 28, 2019, an 8000 class was obstructed between España and Sta. Mesa stations.
- On January 1, 2020, a windshield of a Hyundai Rotem DMU was shattered due to a stoning incident while performing an MNC Trip at Caloocan. The glass window was replaced with polycarbonate the day after the incident. It was also found that a group of minors were the ones who did the crime.
- In February 2020, a window in a KiHa 59 series (Kogane) trainset shattered due to a stoning incident.
- On February 16, 2020, a 203 series trainset was involved in a stone-throwing incident. It damaged a door window and injured one passenger.
- On June 3, 2020, a Hyundai Rotem DMU rammed a car at Abad Santos Railroad Crossing in Tondo, Manila. The crossing barrier was not down when the accident happened. The train dragged the car for about 10 meters.
- On August 28, 2020, an engineer got run over by an 8100 class train near Paco station. The engineer died after the incident.
- On August 22, 2021, three teenagers died after they got run over by a train in Santa Mesa, Manila.
- On September 2, 2021, a Hyundai Rotem DMU train rammed a blue car at the Piy Margal Railroad Crossing in Manila despite early warning by the crossing keepers. No injuries were reported. The PNR management is yet to release a statement about the absence of barriers at the railroad crossing, particularly at the southbound lane.
- On April 12, 2022, a 9-to-12-year-old child died after being run over by 921 hauling a 203 series EMU train at the intersection of Antipolo Street and Ipil Street in Santa Cruz, Manila.
- On September 25, 2022, a DMU train collided with a crane while performing a MNC service in Sta. Mesa, Manila, causing three injuries and damages to the front cab of the train.
- On February 11, 2023, a motorcycle rider suddenly crossed the railroad crossing in Tayuman, Manila when a DEL class locomotive is about to cross the railroad crossing.
- On April 18, 2023, a PNR 900 class locomotive hauling a 203 series EMU derailed near Pasay Road station. No injuries were reported among the 400 passengers on board.
