= Pacita Main Gate station =

Railway station in San Pedro, Laguna, Philippines

Pacita Main Gate
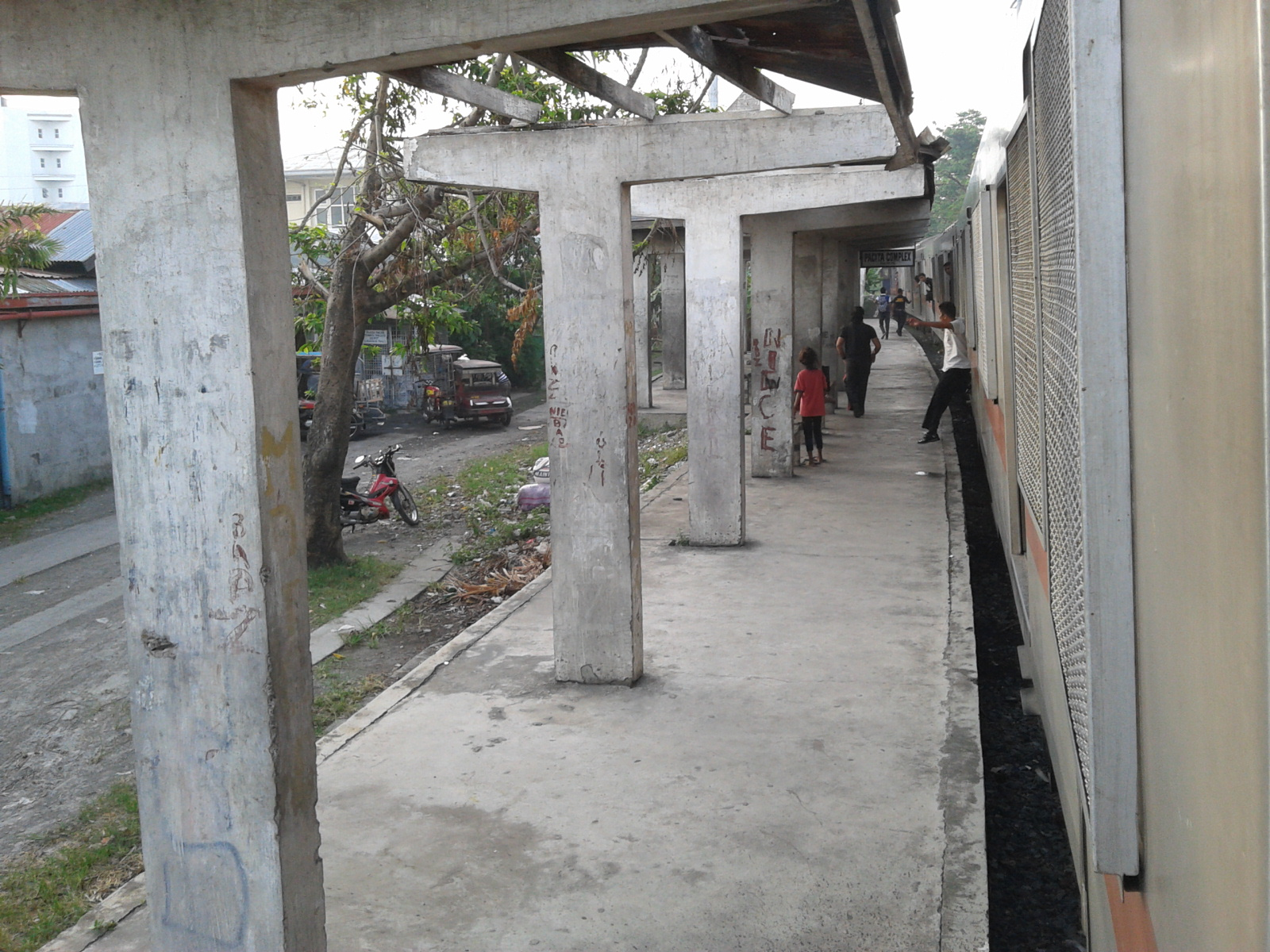
- Platform area of PNR Pacita Complex Station

General information
- Location: Pacita Avenue, Pacita 1
- Coordinates: 14°20′49″N 121°03′49″E
- Owner: Philippine National Railways
- Operator: Philippine National Railways
- Lines: South Main Line; Planned: North–South Commuter
- Platforms: Side platforms
- Tracks: 1
- Connections: Buses, tricycles, jeepneys

Construction
- Structure type: At grade
- Parking: Yes (Centro Pacita, Pacita Commercial Center)

Other information
- Station code: PMG

History
- Opened: November 24, 1975
- Closed: July 2, 2023

Services
Preceding station	PNR	Following station
San Pedro towards Tutuban	Metro South Commuter	Golden City 1 towards IRRI
Future services
Preceding station	PNR	Following station
San Pedro towards Clark International Airport	NSCR Commuter	Biñan towards Calamba
San Pedro towards Tutuban	NSCR Commuter	Biñan towards Calamba
Preceding station	Manila MRT	Following station
San Pedro towards East Valenzuela	Metro Manila Subway	Biñan towards Calamba
Location
- Location within Laguna Location within Luzon Location within Philippines

Pacita Main Gate station (abbreviated Pacita MG) is a railway station located on the South Main Line in San Pedro, Laguna, Philippines. It is located in Pacita Complex 1, San Pedro City, Laguna. As Pacita Main Gate is a flag stop, trains only stop when passengers need to alight or board the station. Nearby landmarks include the Pacita Wet Market, Centro Pacita, Pacita Commercial Center, and Puregold Pacita.

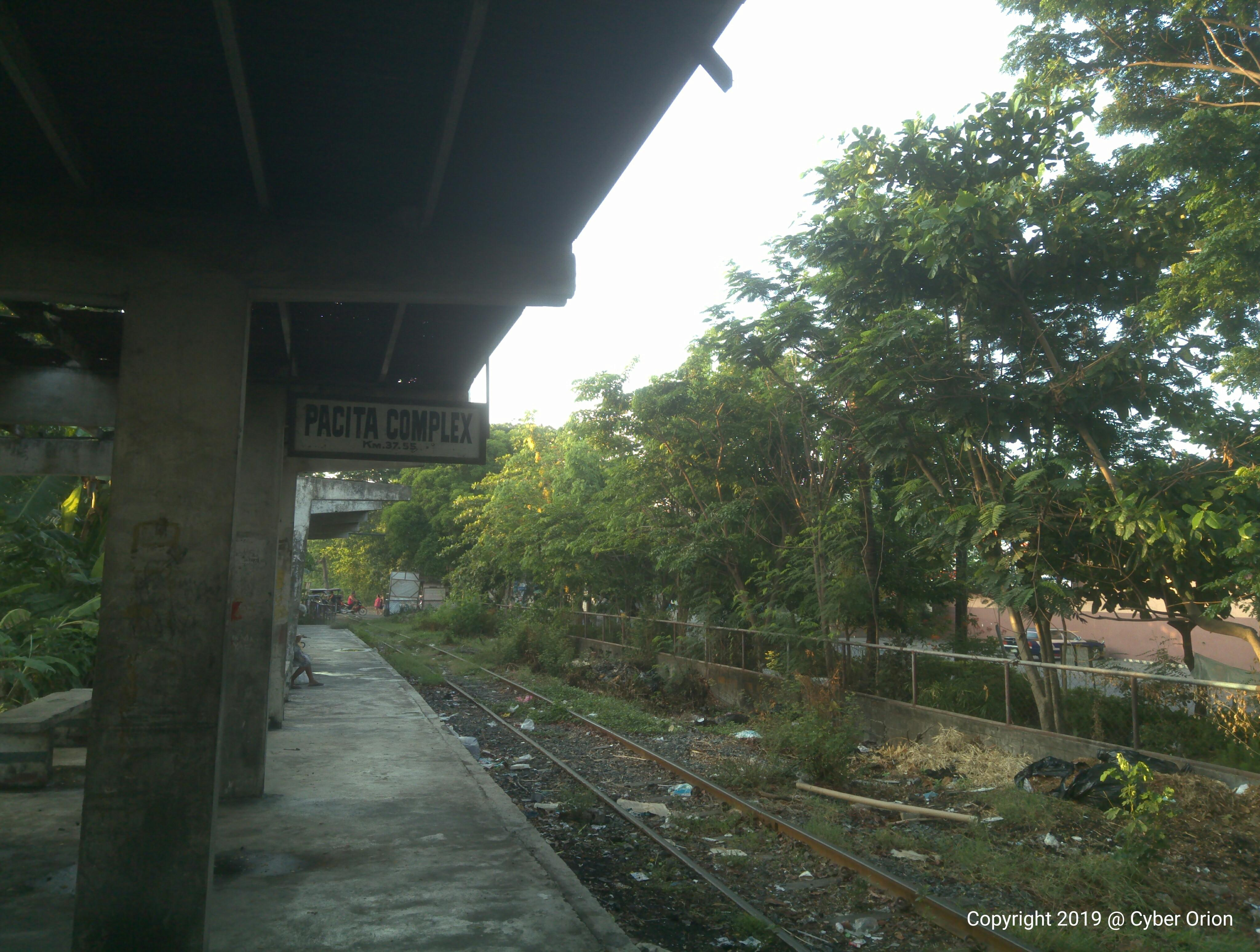
Photo of the flagstop on the platform

The station closed on July 2, 2023 to give way for the construction for the North-South Commuter Railway project. The station will be rebuilt into an elevated station with side platforms and would be slightly relocated from its original position.
