= Biñan station =

Philippine rail station

Biñan
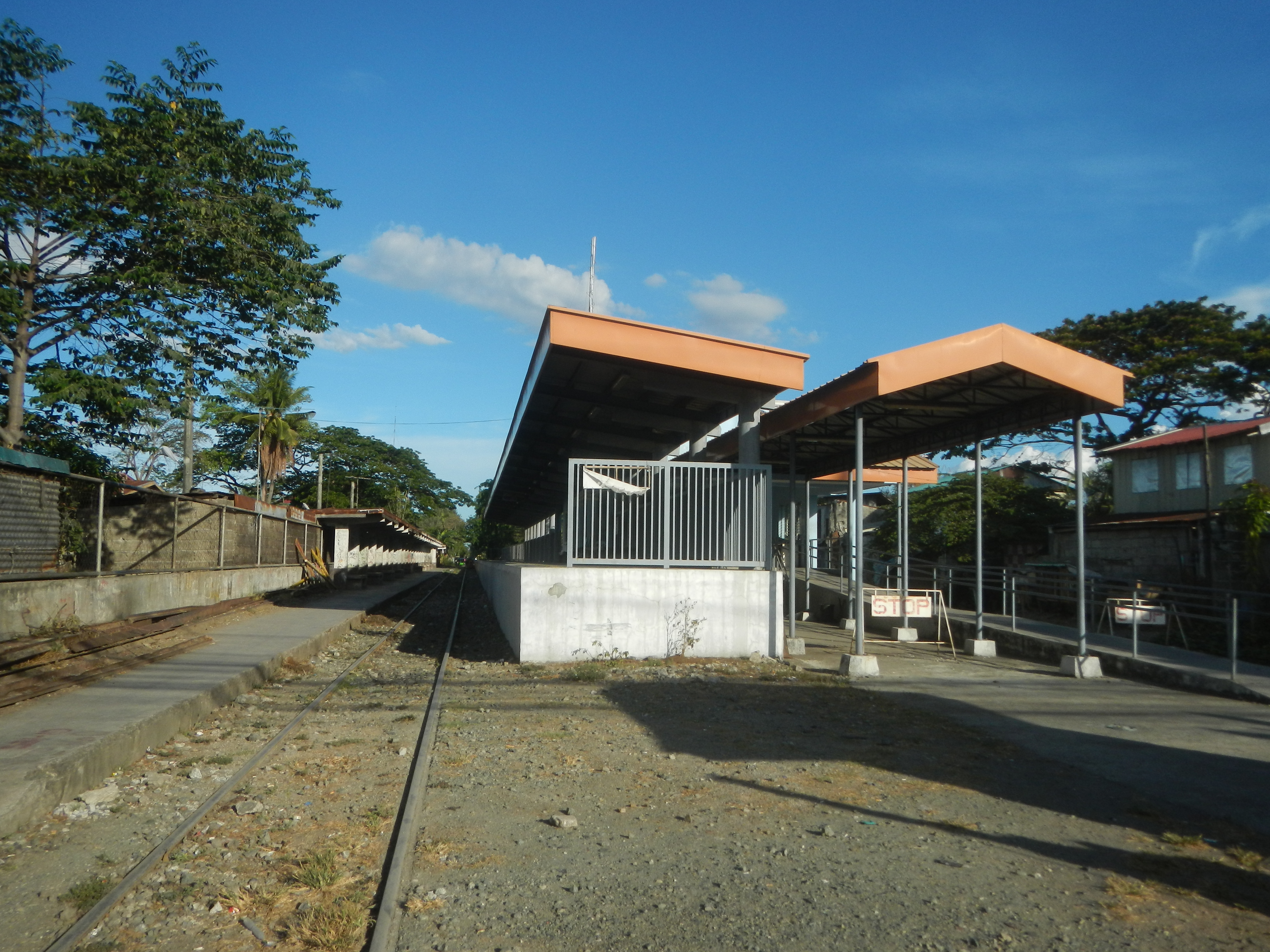
- PNR Biñan station

General information
- Location: General Malvar Street, San Vicente; Biñan, Laguna; Philippines
- Coordinates: 14°19′53.04″N 121°4′52.25″E
- Owner: Philippine National Railways
- Operator: Philippine National Railways
- Lines: South Main Line; Planned: South Commuter
- Platforms: Side platforms
- Tracks: 1, 1 siding track has been covered by the new platform

Construction
- Structure type: At grade
- Accessible: Yes

Other information
- Station code: ÑA

History
- Opened: September 2, 1908
- Closed: July 2, 2023
- Rebuilt: 2013

Services
Preceding station	PNR	Following station
Golden City 1 towards Tutuban	Metro South Commuter	Santa Rosa towards IRRI
Alabang towards Tutuban	Bicol Express	Calamba towards Legazpi
Alabang towards Tutuban	Isarog Limited	Calamba towards Naga
Future services
Preceding station	PNR	Following station
Pacita towards Clark International Airport	NSCR Commuter	Santa Rosa towards Calamba
Pacita towards Tutuban	NSCR Commuter	Santa Rosa towards Calamba
Preceding station	Manila MRT	Following station
Pacita towards East Valenzuela	Metro Manila Subway	Santa Rosa towards Calamba
Location
- Location within Laguna Location within Luzon Location within Philippines

Biñan station (or Biñang station) is a railway station located on the South Main Line in Biñan, Laguna, Philippines.

The station, one of two train stations within the city, is the main station serving the city of Biñan, and was the terminus for Commuter Express trips between Metro Manila and its southern suburbs. Major landmarks near the station include Central Mall Biñan, Forest Lake Memorial Park, Olivarez Plaza, and the main campus of the University of Perpetual Help System JONELTA.

== History ==
The section of the Main Line South from San Pedro to Biñan was opened on September 2, 1908. The station is the first railway station serving Biñan.

The station closed on July 2, 2023 to give way for the construction for the North-South Commuter Railway project. The station will be rebuilt into an elevated station with side platforms and would be slightly relocated from its original position.
