= Santa Rosa station (PNR) =

Railway station in Santa Rosa, Philippines

Santa Rosa
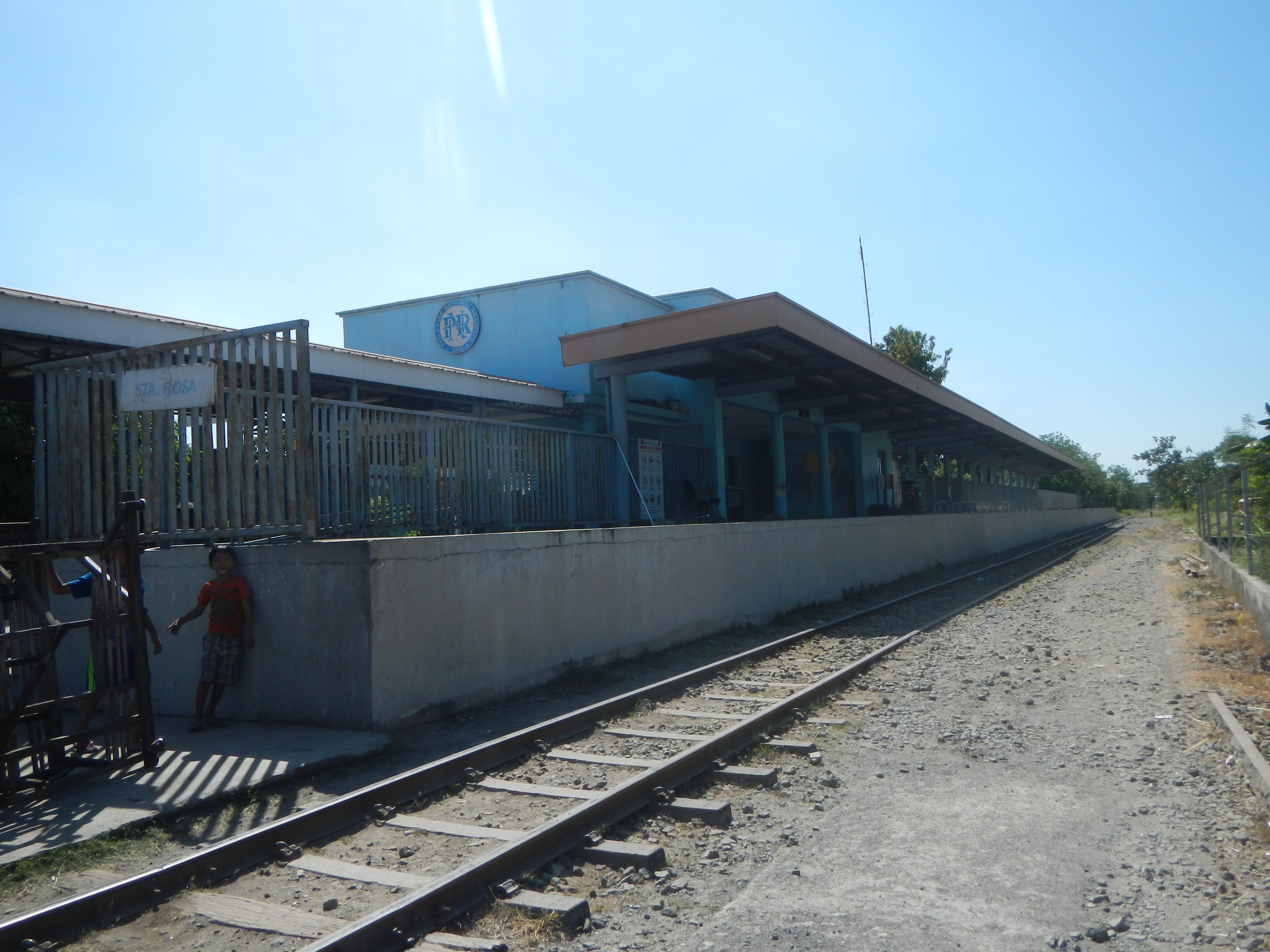
- Santa Rosa station in 2018

General information
- Location: Rizal Boulevard, Labas; Santa Rosa, Laguna; Philippines
- Coordinates: 14.3061°N 121.1098°E
- Owner: Philippine National Railways
- Operator: Philippine National Railways
- Lines: South Main Line; Planned: South Commuter
- Platforms: Side platforms
- Tracks: 1, 1 siding
- Connections: Tricycles and jeepneys

Construction
- Structure type: At grade
- Accessible: Yes

Other information
- Station code: SRL

History
- Opened: October 10, 1908; 117 years ago (old); December 23, 2013; 12 years ago (current)
- Closed: July 2, 2023; 3 years ago
- Former names: Santa Rosa Biñang (c. 1910s)

Services
| Preceding station | PNR | Following station |
|---|---|---|
| Biñan towards Tutuban | Metro South Commuter | Cabuyao towards IRRI |
Future services
| Preceding station | PNR | Following station |
|---|---|---|
| Biñan towards Clark International Airport | NSCR Commuter CIA–Calamba | Cabuyao towards Calamba |
| Biñan towards Tutuban | NSCR Commuter Tutuban–Calamba | Cabuyao towards Calamba |
| Muntinlupa towards Clark International Airport | Commuter Express CIA–Calamba | Cabuyao towards Calamba |
| Muntinlupa towards Tutuban | Commuter Express Tutuban–Calamba | Cabuyao towards Calamba |
| Preceding station | Manila MRT | Following station |
|---|---|---|
| Biñan towards East Valenzuela | Metro Manila Subway | Cabuyao towards Calamba |
Location
- Location within Laguna Location within Luzon Location within Philippines

Santa Rosa station is a railway station located on the South Main Line in Santa Rosa, Laguna, Philippines.

The station was opened on October 10, 1908. Also known then as Santa Rosa Biñang, it is the first railroad station serving the then-town of Santa Rosa. Station operations is temporarily suspended since July 2, 2023, to make way for the construction of the North–South Commuter Railway (NSCR). Its namesake NSCR station will be built as an elevated building in Barangay Tagapo, near Manila South Road and SM City Santa Rosa, about 1.5 kilometers (0.93 mi) from the old station.

The station is adjacent to Labas Barangay Hall, Labas Senior High School, and Don Jose Zavalla and Olympia Park subdivisions. It is a commute away from the city proper of Santa Rosa and the Santa Rosa Commercial Center, the city's main transportation hub located in Balibago.
