= Mamatid station =

Railway station in the Philippines

Mamatid
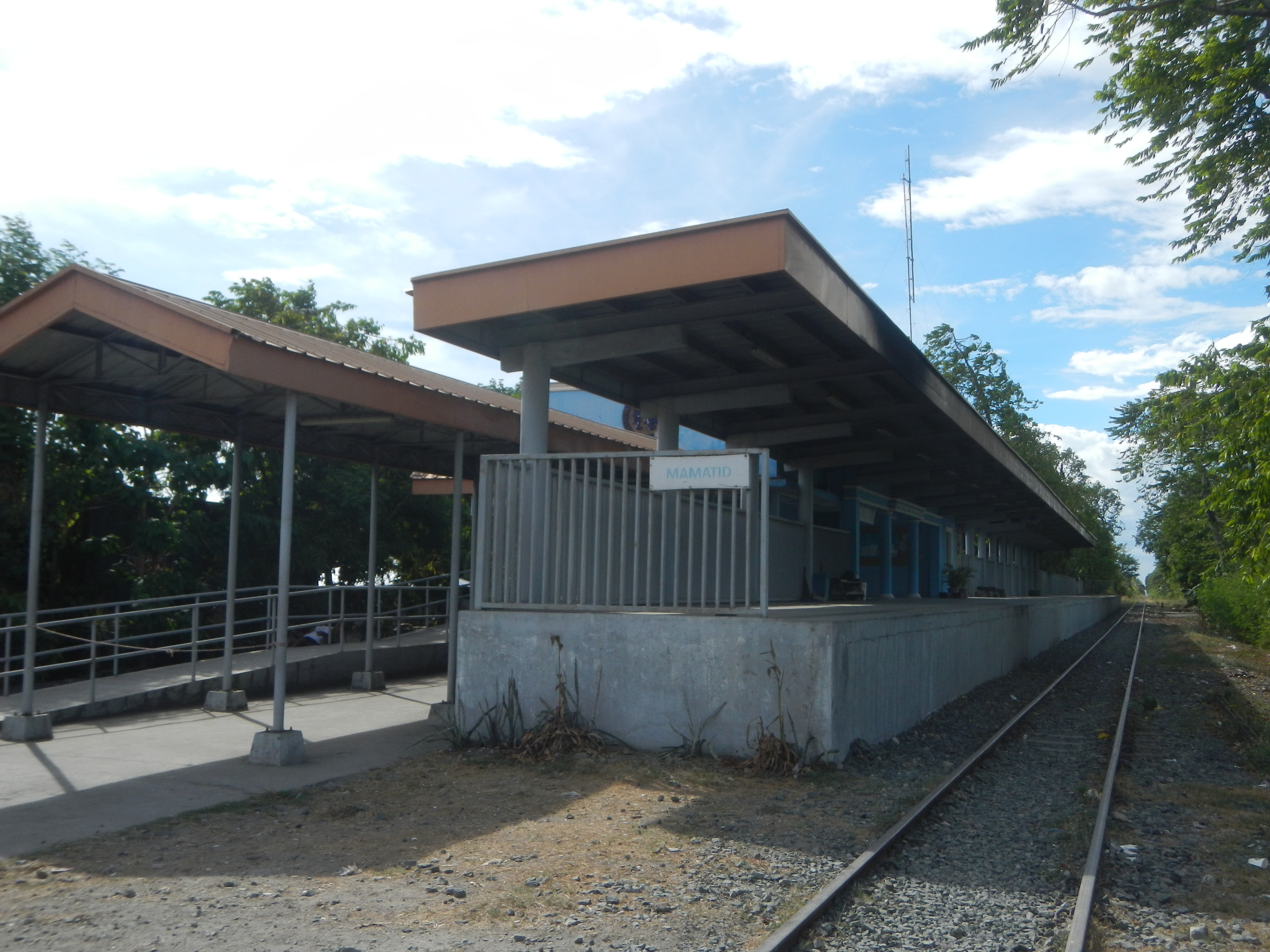
- Mamatid station in 2018

General information
- Location: Mamatid Road, Mamatid; Cabuyao, Laguna; Philippines
- Coordinates: 14.2323°N 121.1456°E
- Owner: Philippine National Railways
- Operator: Philippine National Railways
- Lines: South Main Line; Planned: South Commuter; Former: Canlubang
- Platforms: Side platform
- Tracks: 2

Construction
- Structure type: At grade
- Accessible: Yes

Other information
- Station code: TD

History
- Opened: January 24, 1909; 117 years ago
- Rebuilt: April 28, 2014; 12 years ago

Services
Preceding station	PNR	Following station
Cabuyao towards Tutuban	Metro South Commuter	Calamba towards IRRI
Location
- Location within Laguna Location within Luzon Location within Philippines

Mamatid station is a railway station located on the South Main Line in Laguna, Philippines.

== History ==
Mamatid opened on January 24, 1909 and was also the starting point of the now-defunct Canlubang Line, which connects it to the former Canlubang Sugar Mill in Canlubang, Calamba, Laguna. Today, it connects to the Nuvali urban township of Ayala Land.

The present station building was completed in 2014.

=== Future ===
Mamatid is set to be replaced by Banlic station, where there will be a cross-platform interchange to the PNR South Long Haul line.
