= Alabang station =

Train station in Muntinlupa, Philippines

Alabang
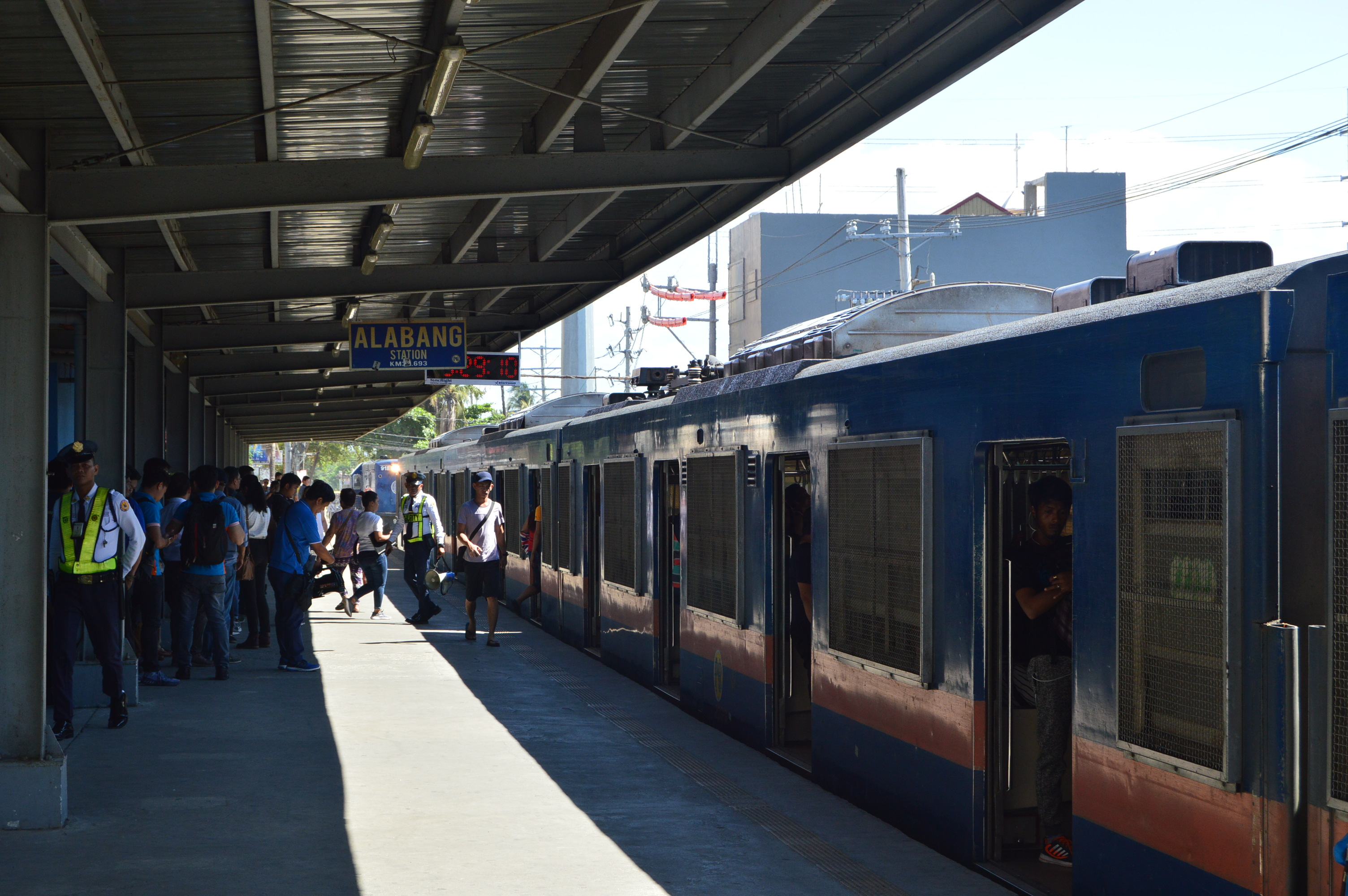
- Alabang station in 2019

General information
- Location: T. Molina Street, Alabang; Muntinlupa, Metro Manila; Philippines
- Coordinates: 14°25′10.46″N 121°2′51.63″E
- Owner: Philippine National Railways
- Operator: Philippine National Railways
- Lines: South Main Line; Planned: South Commuter
- Platforms: Side platform
- Tracks: 1, plus 1 siding track
- Connections: Buses, jeepneys, and PUVs

Construction
- Structure type: At grade
- Cycle facilities: No
- Accessible: Yes (2016)

Other information
- Status: Mostly Terminus
- Station code: AA

History
- Opened: 1908; 118 years ago
- Closed: March 28, 2024; 2 years ago
- Rebuilt: April 19, 2010; 16 years ago

Services
Preceding station	PNR	Following station
Sucat towards Tutuban	Metro South Commuter	Muntinlupa towards Calamba
Sucat towards Tutuban	Metro South Commuter	Terminus
Future services
Preceding station	PNR	Following station
Sucat towards Clark International Airport	Airport Limited Express	Terminus
Sucat towards Clark International Airport	NSCR Commuter	Muntinlupa towards Calamba
Sucat towards Tutuban	NSCR Commuter	Muntinlupa towards Calamba
Sucat towards Clark International Airport	Commuter Express CIA–Calamba	Muntinlupa towards Calamba
Sucat towards Tutuban	Commuter Express Tutuban–Calamba	Muntinlupa towards Calamba
Preceding station	Manila MRT	Following station
Sucat towards East Valenzuela	Metro Manila Subway	Muntinlupa towards Calamba
Location
- Location within Metro Manila Location within Luzon Location within Philippines

Alabang station is a railway station located on the PNR South Main Line in Muntinlupa, Metro Manila, Philippines. It is the sixteenth station southbound from Tutuban and is one of three Philippine National Railways (PNR) stations serving Muntinlupa, the two others being Sucat and Muntinlupa. The station is located on T. Molina Street in Alabang, Muntinlupa.

Alabang station is the only PNR station to be completely rebuilt in a different location, having been moved from its original location at Montillano Street to the back of Starmall Alabang on T. Molina Street. The new station was opened on April 19, 2010. The other one is Dela Rosa station, which was moved a block south to accommodate the longer trains and mitigate traffic congestion at the grade crossing along Gil Puyat Avenue. On March 28, 2024, station operations were temporarily suspended to make way for the construction of the North–South Commuter Railway. The station will be repurposed as an elevated station.

There are 397 observed road crossings between Alabang and Legazpi. Of these, 214 are authorized and 183 are unauthorized. Only 31 of the authorized crossings are officially staffed by PNR and none of the unauthorized crossings are staffed. Unauthorized crossings are ones that have been established without the formal consent of PNR and are often in areas of high encroachment.

== Nearby landmarks ==
Alabang station is located within the residential and commercial area of Alabang. It is also near educational institutions such as the Saint Bernadette College of Alabang and Alabang Elementary School and other shopping centres like Lianas Supermarket and Department Store and South Park Center. Further away from the station are Filinvest City, Saint Francis of Assisi College Alabang, West Bay College, San Roque Catholic School - Annex, and Pedro E. Diaz High School.

The station was directly connected to the Starmall Alabang shopping mall until it was closed due to a 2022 fire and later demolished.

== Transportation links ==
The station is accessible through jeepneys plying the South Luzon Expressway, Alabang-Zapote Road, Manila South Road (National Highway), and Montillano Street routes. A terminal for buses and jeepneys can be found at Vista Terminal Exchange, located beside the former Starmall Alabang, while the South Station jeepney terminal is located across the mall on the other side of the South Luzon Expressway. A point-to-point bus terminal is also found near South Park Center.
