= Carmona station =

Carmona

General information
- Location: Magsaysay; San Pedro, Laguna
- Coordinates: 14°20′8.15″N 121°2′2.29″E
- Owner: Philippine National Railways
- Line: Carmona Branch Line
- Platforms: Side platforms
- Tracks: 2 (1 main, 1 siding)

Construction
- Structure type: At grade

History
- Opened: April 1, 1971
- Closed: 2010
Location

San Pedro-Carmona Resettlement station, often shortened to Carmona, sometimes was called General Mariano Alvarez (GMA) station was the terminus of the San Pedro-Carmona Line located in Magsaysay, San Pedro, Laguna. The line was built to serve the Carmona Resettlement Project, which was a part of Carmona, Cavite until the creation of General Mariano Alvarez in 1981. It was located just before San Jose Bridge beside the San Isidro River.

== History ==
Carmona opened on April 1, 1973. Twenty-six trains (14 trips each directions) serve the line from Manila and Caloocan and vice versa. The last train arrived at the station in 2010 to lift the tracks. The station is now being considered as a stop for a shuttle service from Dela Rosa in Makati, with a targeted opening in 2019.

Eleven thieves masquerading as PNR Engineering Department personnel were caught pilfering railway parts by the PNR Civil Security Office and Incident Response team in close proximity to the station, having carted away actual rails already cut down to pieces. The thieves were charged.

== Layout ==
The station consists of one main track and a siding. Staircases connect the lobby, platform, and the entrance of the station.
