= Calamba station =

Railway station in Laguna, Philippines

Calamba
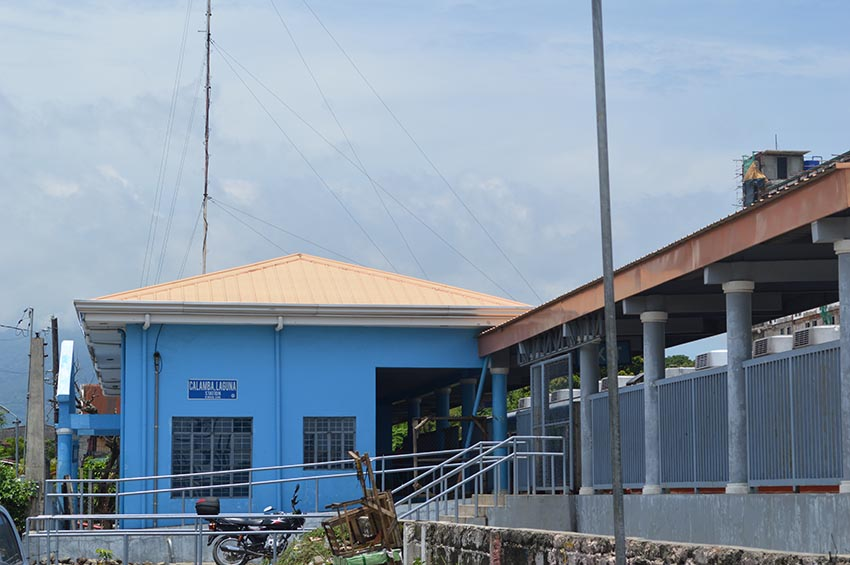
- Exterior of Calamba station

General information
- Location: J.P. Rizal Street, Poblacion; Calamba, Laguna; Philippines
- Coordinates: 14°12′25.02″N 121°09′29.08″E
- Owner: Philippine National Railways
- Operator: Philippine National Railways
- Lines: South Main Line; Planned: South Commuter; Former: Batangas
- Platforms: Side platform
- Tracks: Three: 2 siding tracks 1 mainline track

Construction
- Structure type: At grade
- Accessible: Yes

Other information
- Station code: LA

History
- Opened: January 24, 1909; 117 years ago December 2, 2014; 11 years ago (current station)
- Rebuilt: 2013; 13 years ago

Services
Preceding station	PNR	Following station
Mamatid towards Tutuban	Metro South Commuter	Pansol towards IRRI
Biñan towards Tutuban	Bicol Express	San Pablo towards Legazpi
Biñan towards Tutuban	Isarog Limited	San Pablo towards Naga
Terminus	Inter-Provincial Commuter	Pansol towards Lucena
Future services
Preceding station	PNR	Following station
Cabuyao towards Clark International Airport	NSCR Commuter CIA–Calamba	Terminus
Cabuyao towards Tutuban	NSCR Commuter Tutuban–Calamba	Terminus
Cabuyao towards Clark International Airport	Commuter Express CIA–Calamba	Terminus
Cabuyao towards Tutuban	Commuter Express Tutuban–Calamba	Terminus
Preceding station	Manila MRT	Following station
Cabuyao towards East Valenzuela	Metro Manila Subway	Terminus
Location
- Location within Laguna Location within Luzon Location within Philippines

Calamba station is a railway station located on the South Main Line in Laguna, Philippines. It is one of two railway stations in the city and it is a major station on the line, serving as the junction between the South Main Line and the old Calamba–Batangas branch line which used to connect to Batangas City. It is also envisioned to be the terminus of the Commuter Express when rehabilitation work is complete. The station was first opened on January 24, 1909.

The existing PNR line from Calamba to Legazpi is conventional ballasted track, where parallel steel rails are laid upon sleepers embedded in ballast (except on open deck bridges). Embankment is either on fill or at grade. Rails weigh 37 kg/m and are laid on sleepers of both wood and concrete. From Calamba to Legazpi, most stations and flag stops have been used for non-railway purposes such as residences, storage areas or as public gathering areas. Most of these stations south of Calamba are in conditions insufficient for efficient and safe operations as a railway passenger station. From Calamba to Legazpi, the line is single-tracked and, similar to the Commuter Line, is narrow gauge (1,067 mm).Overall, the condition of the existing PNR line from Calamba to Legazpi is in fair condition largely on account of good construction, relatively light axle loads and very little accumulated traffic. Most rail defects and damage is due to poor maintenance of joints. Bridges are in widely varying states largely due to lack of maintenance, old age and inadequate protection from natural elements.

Major landmarks near the station include SM City Calamba, the Calamba Central Bus and Jeepney Terminal, and the Calamba Medical Center.

== Hybrid Electric Train ==
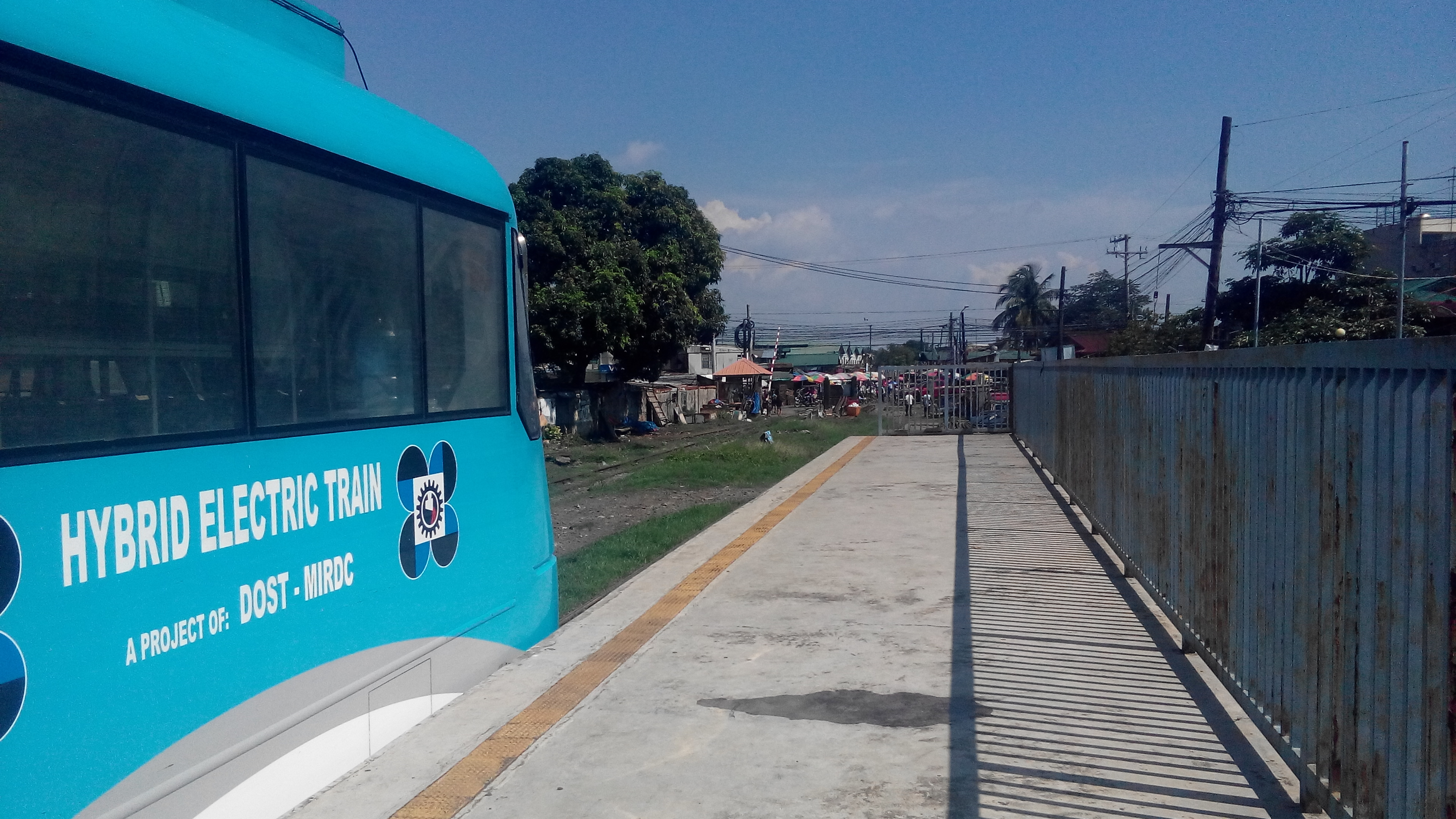
DOST-MIRDC Hybrid Electric Train (HET) awaiting departure at Calamba station

The Hybrid Electric Train headquarters is also located at Calamba station departure, built by Department of Science and Technology's Metals Industry Research and Development Center, It is the main station of the Hybrid Electric Train (HET), runs from Calamba to San Pablo in Laguna to the south on May 6, 2019. The train project began 2012 and built in year 2014–2015. The project was introduced to the public and the media in June 2016.

== Reconstruction ==
A new Calamba station will be constructed beside the José Rizal Coliseum (simple) at Barangay Real as part of the North–South Commuter Railway. This new station is expected to be fully operational along with the rest of the system by 2029.

On October 21, 2024, the PNR resumed its PNR South Main Line services for the Lucena-Calamba-Lucena line. The PNR train stops include San Pablo station, Calamba, Sariaya, Lutucan, Candelaria, Tiaong (Lalig), IRRI, UP Los Baños station-Junction station, Masili and Pansol stations.
