= Metro Clark =

Urban area in the Philippines

Metro Clark Metro Angeles Metro Pampanga–Tarlac
- Metropolitan area
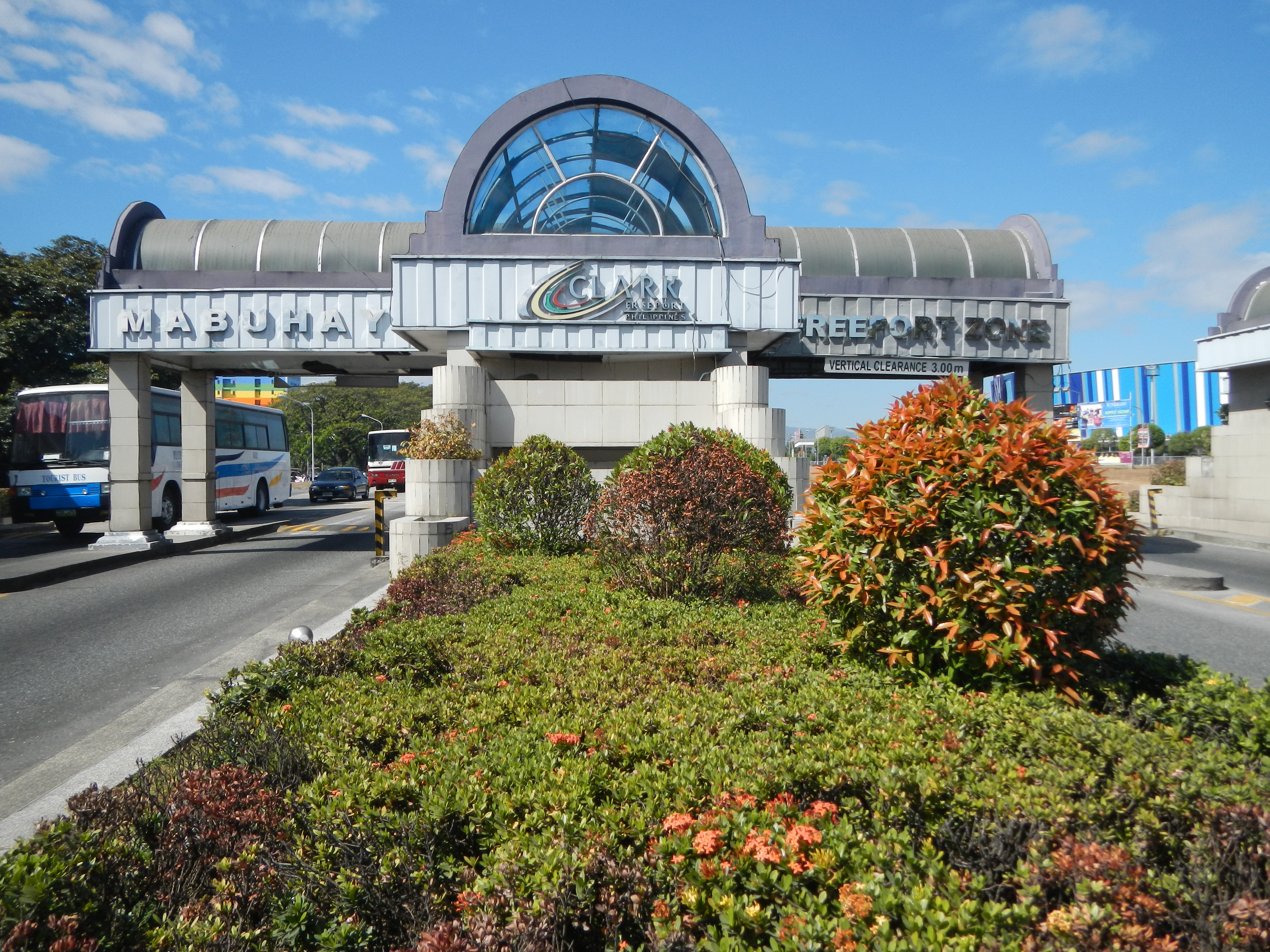
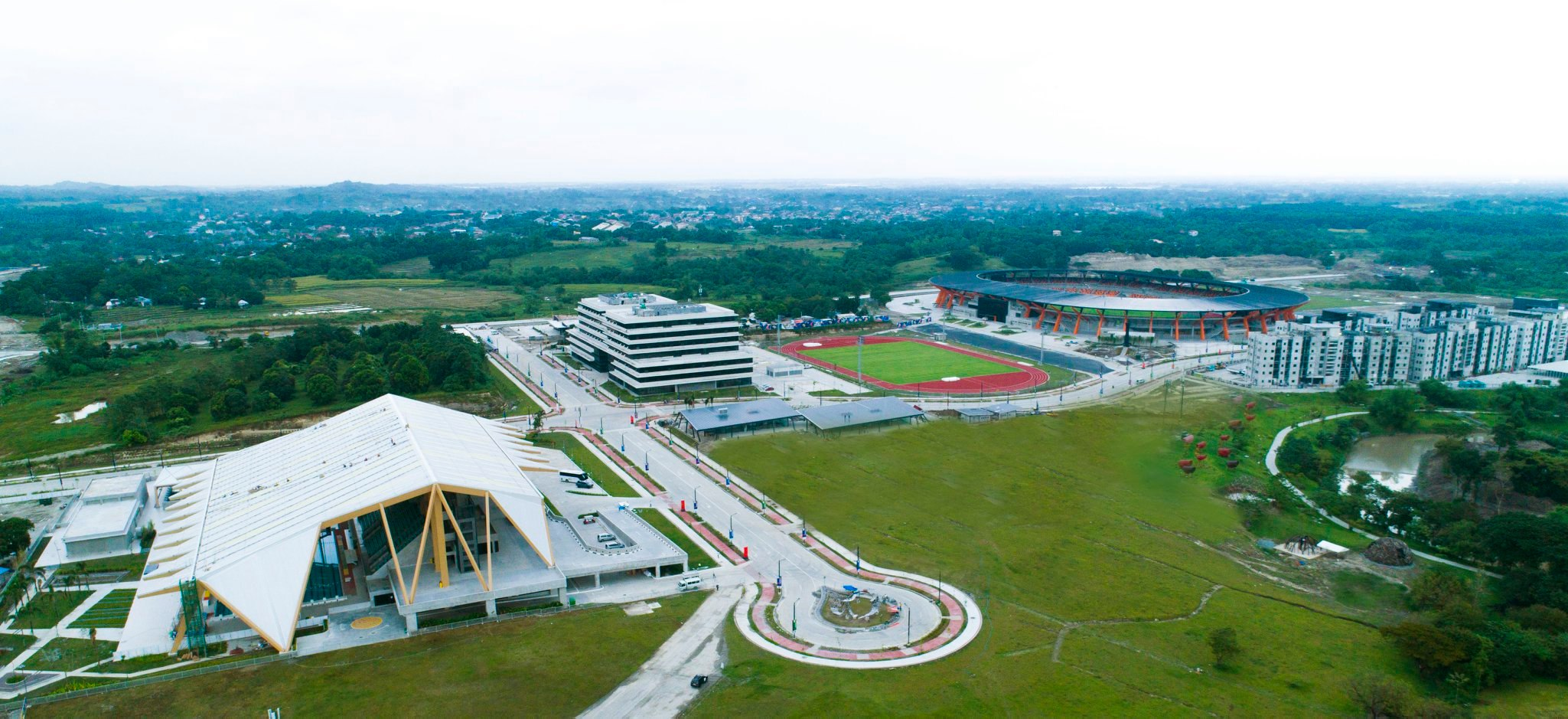
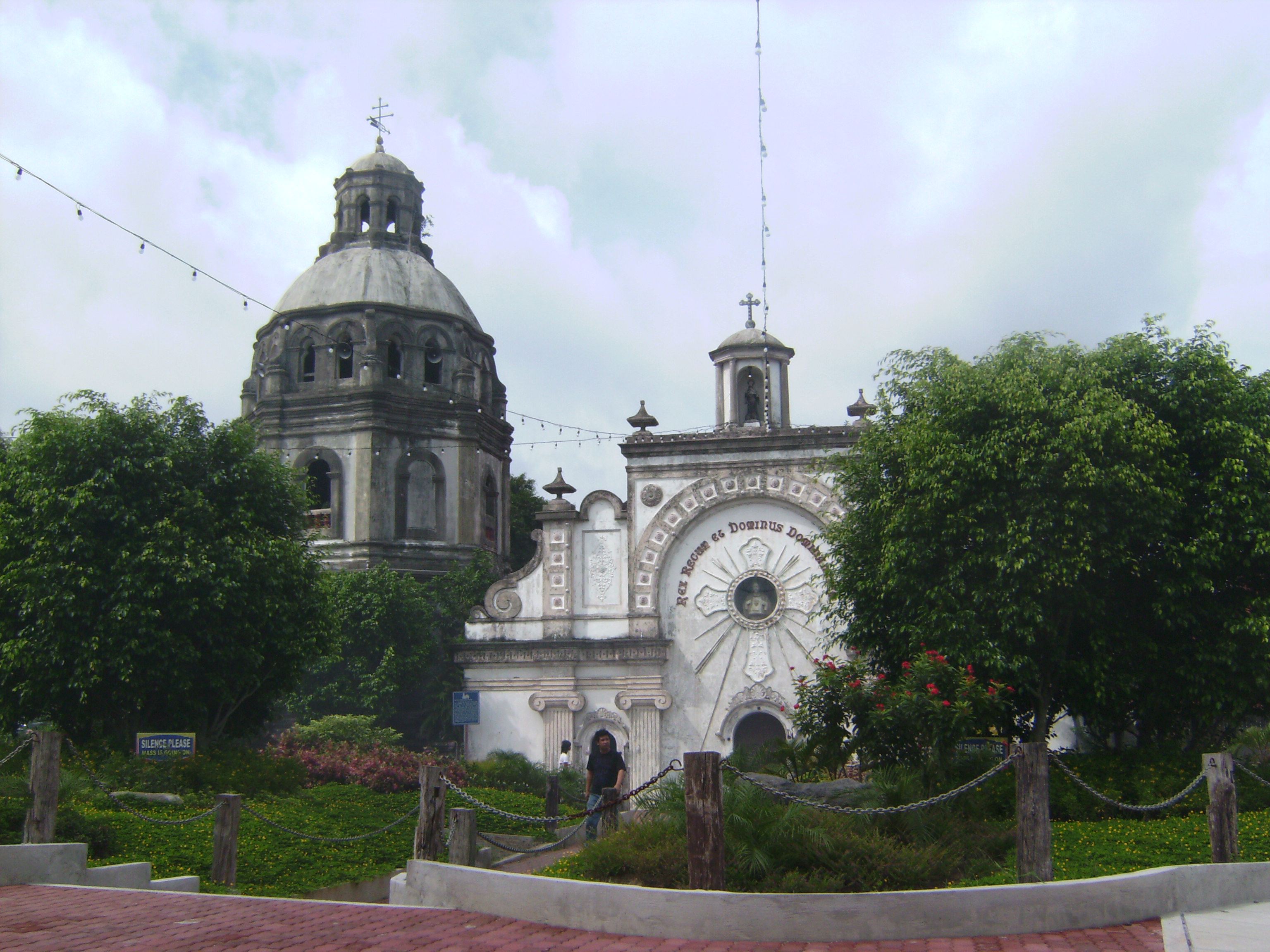
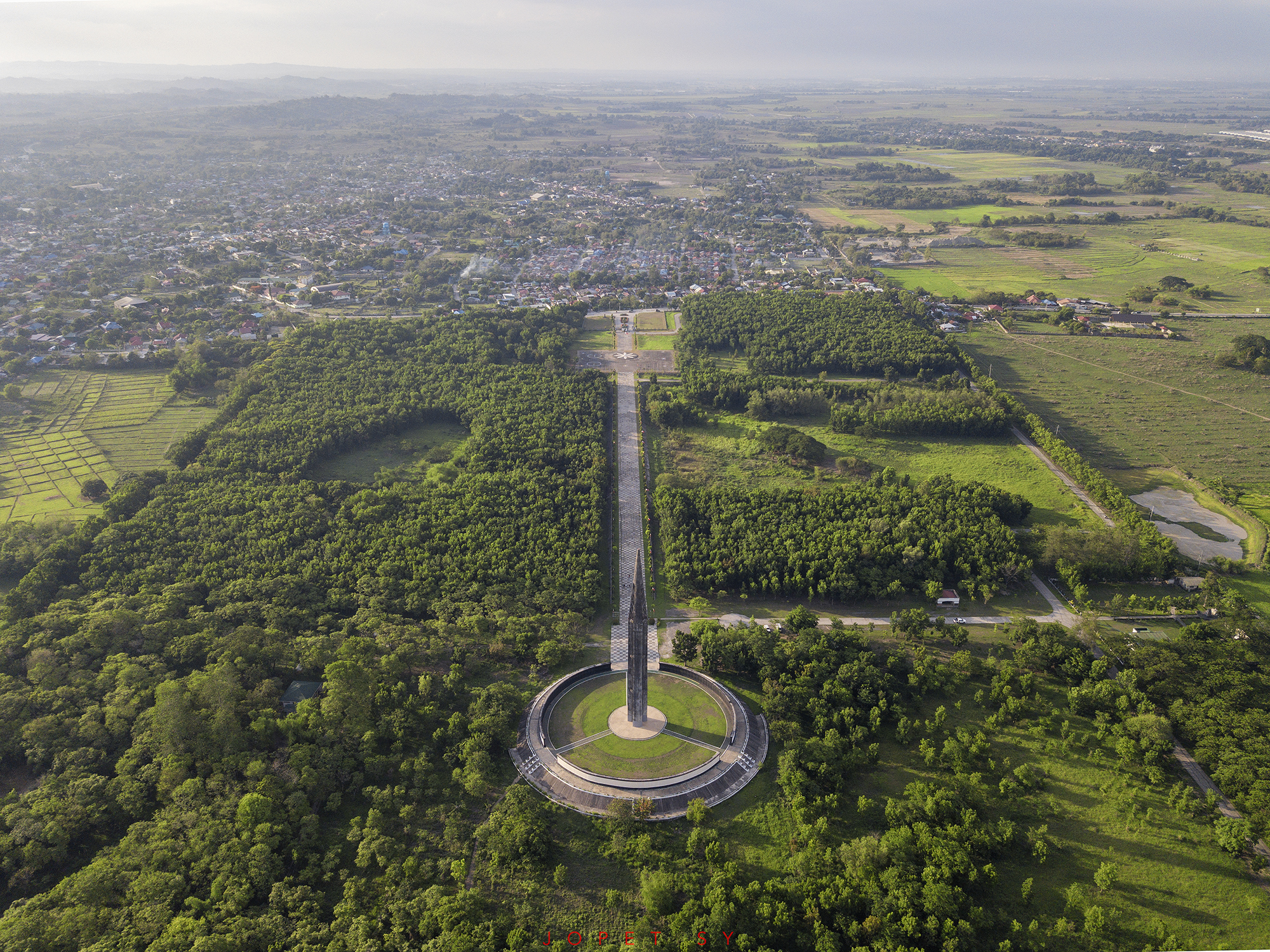
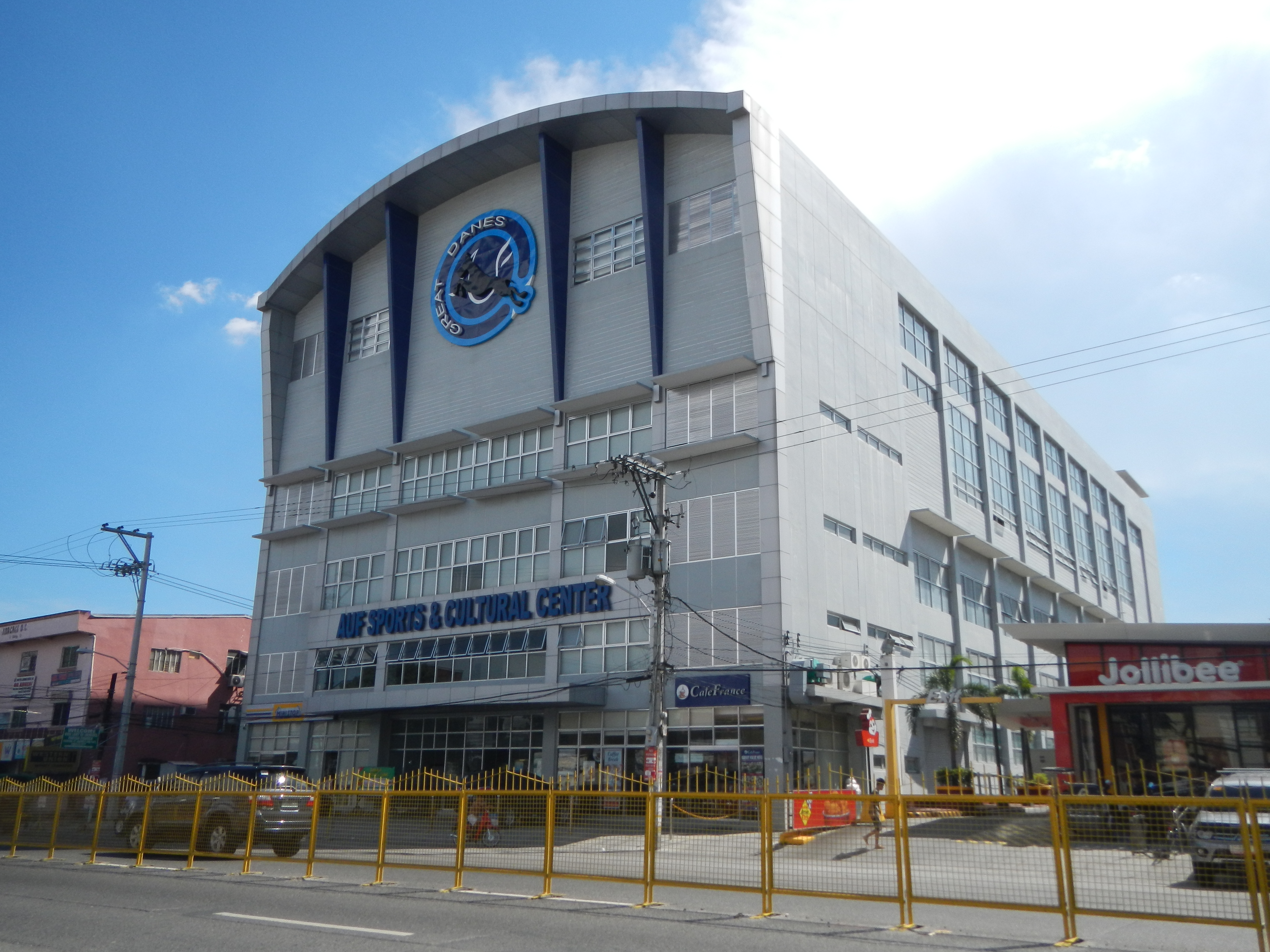
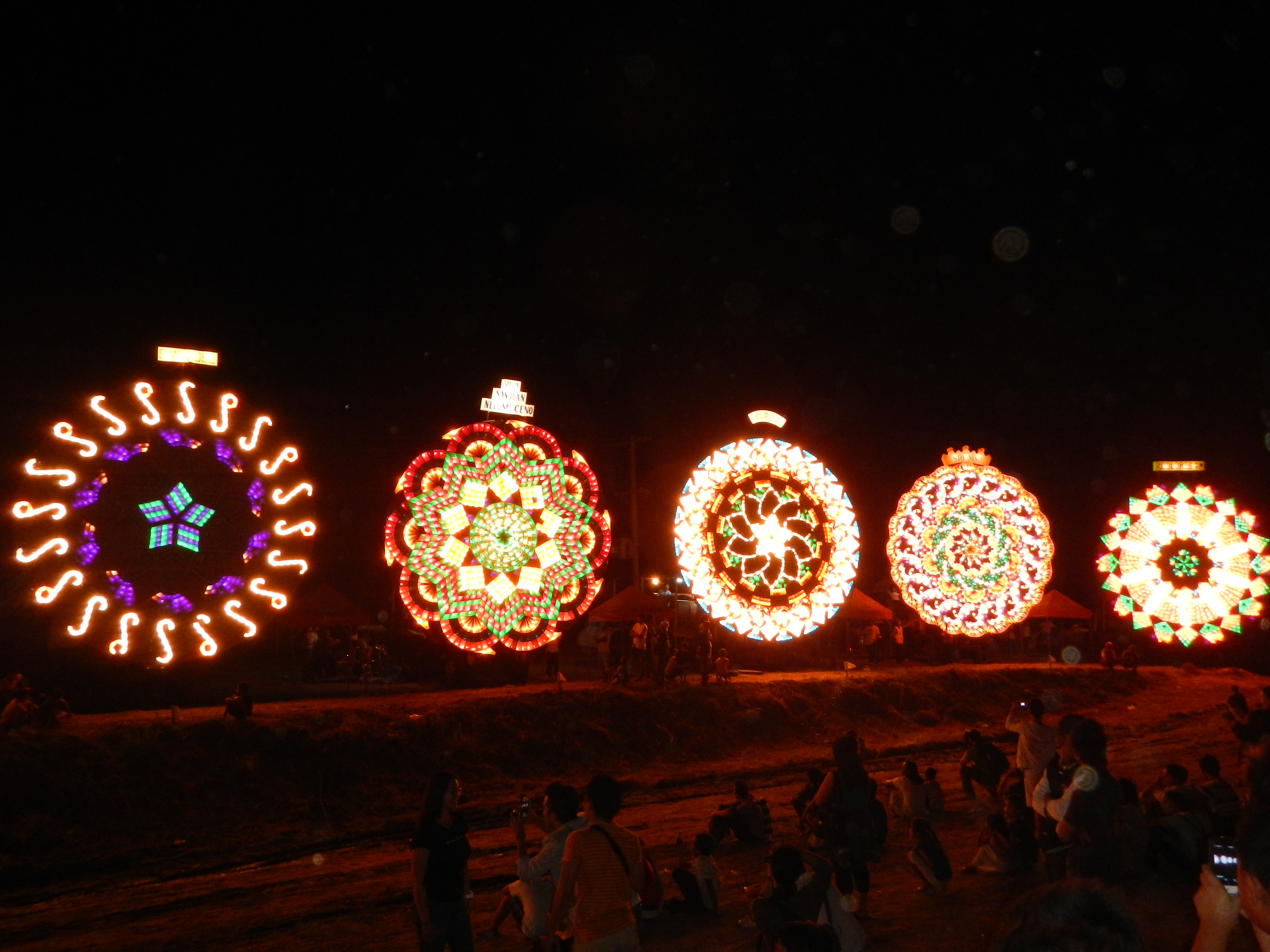
- From left to right: Clark Freeport Zone entrance, Bayanihan Park, New Clark City Sports Hub, San Guillermo Parish Church, Capas National Shrine, AUF Sports and Cultural Center, Giant Lantern Festival
- Country: Philippines
- Region: Central Luzon (Region III)
- Provinces: Pampanga; Tarlac
- Cities: Pampanga: Angeles; Mabalacat; San Fernando
- Municipalities: Pampanga: Arayat; Bacolor; Lubao; Magalang; Mexico; Porac; Santo Tomas Tarlac: Bamban; Capas
- Largest city: Angeles City

Population (2020)
  - Total: 1.6 million

Metro Clark, also known as Metro Angeles, Metro Pampanga–Tarlac, and Pampanga Megalopolis, is an urban area in Pampanga and Tarlac, Philippines. It is primarily composed of three cities and nine municipalities. Its urban core consists of Angeles, San Fernando, and Mabalacat. It is a major urban area of the Philippines and is considered the industrial and residential center of Central Luzon.

Anchored on Clark International Airport and the Clark Special Economic Zone, the area's economy is based on transportation, logistics, education, commerce, banking, manufacturing and healthcare. It is also a major population center, housing 38% of people living in Pampanga, and 8% of all people living in Central Luzon. It is touted to be the second major metropolitan area in Luzon, serving as a "countermagnet" to Metro Manila and the Greater Manila Area, and also as a means to decongest the national capital region, metropolitan area, and urbanization region.

== Etymology ==
Metro Clark is named after the Clark Air Base, a former United States military airbase that has been converted into a freeport zone and a commercial airport serving North and Central Luzon.

In the past, several names have been used to label the urban area of Pampanga centered on its capital San Fernando and adjacent towns to the airbase, namely, Angeles and Mabalacat. These include Metro Angeles, San Fernando-Angeles metropolitan area, Metro Pampanga, Pampanga Triangle, and the Pampanga Golden Triangle.

In 2017, in its most recent national development plan, the National Economic Development Authority identified Metro Clark as one of the regional centers in the country.

== Definition ==
The urban core of Metro Clark is composed of the cities of Angeles, San Fernando and Mabalacat.

Meanwhile, several municipalities form the urban fringe. Magalang, Arayat, Mexico, Santo Tomas, Bacolor, Lubao, Porac of Pampanga; and Bamban and Capas of Tarlac all have been recognised as towns supporting the urban core of Metro Clark.

The Metro Clark Advisory Board created in 1993 lists Angeles, Mabalacat, Porac, Capas and Bamban as members. All of these four local government units directly border the Clark Freeport Zone.

- ∗ Urban Core
- Urban Fringe

City or Municipality	Population (2020)	Land Area (in km^{2})	Population Density (per km^{2})
Angeles*	462,928	63.37	7,305.16
San Fernando*	354,666	67.74	5,235.70
Mabalacat*	293,244	82.20	3,567.45
Arayat	133,492	134.48	992.65
Bacolor	48,066	71.70	670.38
Lubao	173,502	155.77	1,113.83
Magalang	124,188	97.32	1,276.08
Mexico	173,403	117.41	1,476.90
Santo Tomas	42,846	21.30	2,011.55
Bamban, Tarlac	78,260	251.98	310.58
Capas, Tarlac	156,056	376.39	414.61
Urban Core only	1,110,838	213.31	5,207.62
Total	2,040,651	1,439.66	1,417.45

== Geography ==
The urban core of the metropolitan area sits in northern Pampanga in Central Luzon. It is in the eastern foot of Mt. Pinatubo, an active volcano that last erupted in 1991. It is roughly 98 meters above sea level and is around 82 kilometers north of Metro Manila.

The area forms an elongated area roughly starting from San Fernando, the capital city of Pampanga and runs in a northwesterly direction following the Jose Abad Santos Avenue and the expressway (North Luzon Expressway). It ends in the cities of Angeles and Mabalacat, which have formed a single contiguous urban area.

== Economy ==
Metro Clark supports a diverse economy built around transportation and storage, offshoring, and manufacturing.

The biggest freeport zone in Central Luzon, the Clark Freeport Zone (CFZ), was established in 1993. As of the end of August 2023, there are 1,113 business locators here that employ 136,836 regular workers. There are around 60 business process outsourcing company locators in CFZ. In 2019, the freeport was also identified as the top manufacturer of electronics exports of Central Luzon. Other locators include electric vehicle, food and furniture manufacturers.

Metro Clark is also a real estate hotspot, just behind Manila and Cebu, as it holds of 17% newly leased space nationwide in 2023. According to real estate search website Lamudi, Clark is a strong regional market, with an 800% increase in leads online between 2018 and 2019. Several major real estate companies have launched township projects in the area. It is considered ripe for luxury projects targeting affluent markets in Angeles and San Fernando; as well as industrial developments. From 2022 to 2026, professional services firm Colliers also projects the delivery of 150 condominium units annually, with San Fernando covering about 62% of the new supply during that period.

The urban area also has a burgeoning hotel and leisure sector. As of June 2019, there are about 31 deluxe and traditional hotels within the trade area with a total supply of 5,020 rooms, dominated by deluxe hotels based on the number of keys.

According to the PDIC, in 2021, there are 221 banking offices in the urban area, which is 65% of all banking offices in the province of Pampanga. The urban area also held 260 billion pesos in banking deposits, representing 84% of the total banking deposits in the province.

== Politics ==
The urban area is represented in the lower house of the Philippines as part of Pampanga province: San Fernando is part of the 3rd District of Pampanga; while Angeles and Mabalacat are parts of the 1st District.

San Fernando and Mabalacat are both component cities which means they are still able to vote for provincial officials. Angeles is a highly urbanized city, which means it is administratively independent of Pampanga, but is grouped with the province for representational purposes.

== Arts and culture ==
San Fernando is considered the heart of Kapampangan culture. Pampanga itself is widely considered to be the culinary capital of the Philippines. Sisig was created in Angeles.

At the moment, the area is served by five museums. The Museum of Philippine Arts and Culture in Angeles is the most recent addition. Some other notable ones include Museo ning Angeles, which was established in 1999 showcasing history of Angeles City; the Museum of Philippine Social History in Angeles City, which is housed in the historic Pamintuan Mansion; and Clark 4D Museum hosting interactive displays on the history of Clark.

== Education ==
The metropolitan area is home to some of Central Luzon's first universities, including Angeles University Foundation (elevated 1971), University of the Assumption (elevated 1980), and Holy Angel University (elevated 1980). The University of the Philippines Diliman Extension Program in Pampanga (established 1979), is located inside Clark Freeport.

== Transportation ==
Metro Clark is served by a major airport, an upcoming railway line and several major roads.

Clark International Airport is branded as the gateway to North and Central Luzon. It is the country's 17th busiest airport in 2022. It opened for commercial flights in 1996, and underwent several expansions in the 2010s. In 2022, its new passenger terminal building opened. In May 2023, the airport serviced 73,226 domestic passengers and 115,847 international passengers, which were 617% and 134% higher, respectively, than in May 2022.

The under-construction railway line, North-South Commuter Railway (NSCR) will serve communities in Metro Clark when it is completed in 2029. Stations will be built in San Fernando, Angeles, and Clark International Airport. Once operational, the NSCR is expected to service as many as 800,000 passengers daily and cut travel time from Clark International Airport in Pampanga to Calamba, Laguna to less than two hours.

Buses are also a popular form of transport. Dau Bus Terminal in Mabalacat, Pampanga is a major interchange from buses from Metro Manila. It serves routes going to Bataan, Tarlac, Zambales, and most destinations to the north, such as Baguio, Pangasinan and Nueva Ecija.

Major highways that run through Metro Clark include Jose Abad Santos Avenue, the North Luzon Expressway and the Subic-Clark-Tarlac Expressway.

== See also ==
- Metro Cagayan de Oro
- Metro Cebu
- Metro Davao
- Metro Manila
- Metro Olongapo
