= Apalit station =

Train station in Apalit, Philippines

Apalit
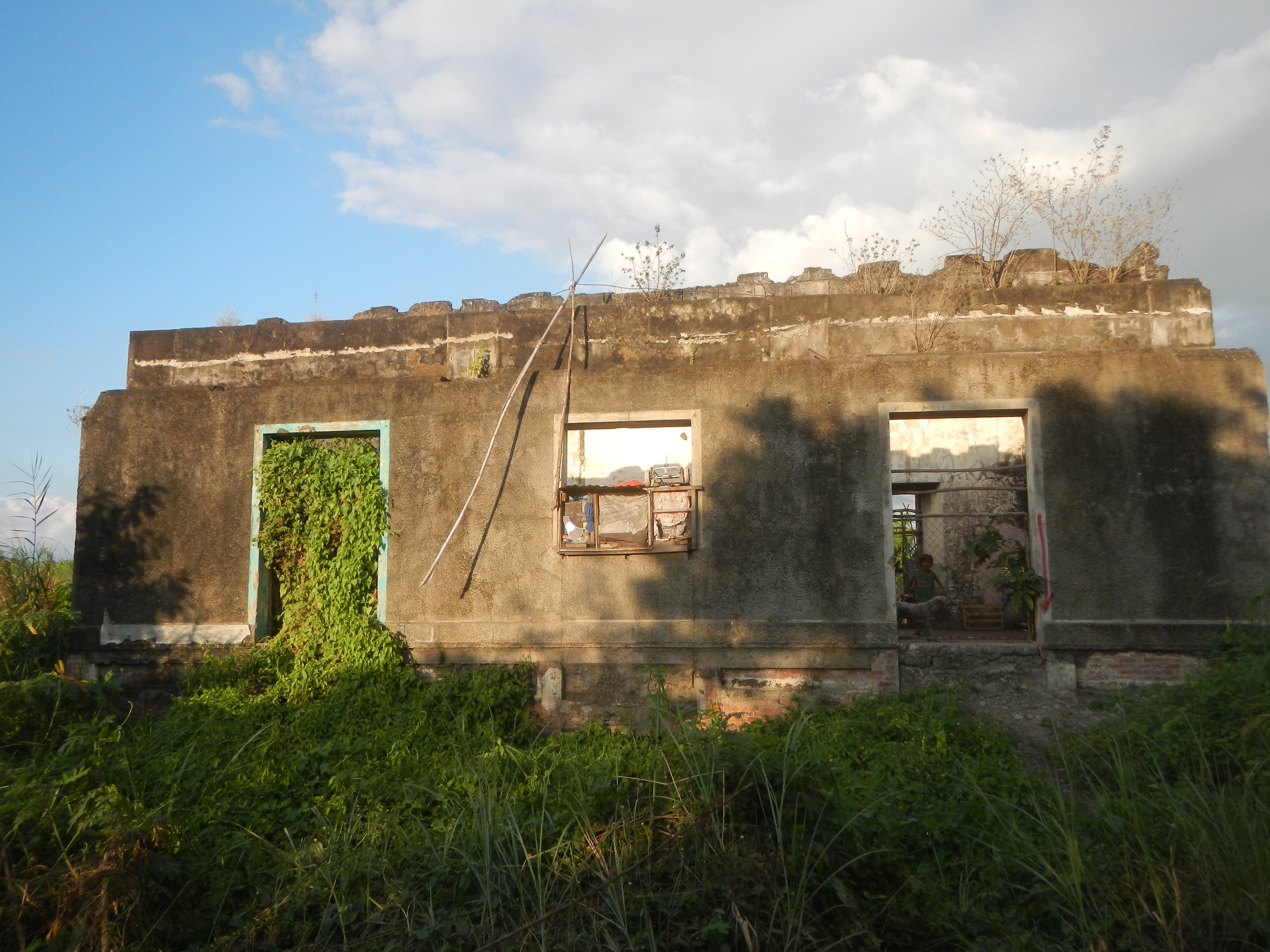
- Ruins of the old railway station

General information
- Location: San Vicente; Apalit, Pampanga; Philippines
- Coordinates: 14°56′41″N 120°44′58″E
- Owner: Philippine National Railways
- Operator: Philippine National Railways
- Lines: Planned: North Commuter; Former: North Main Line
- Platforms: Side platform
- Tracks: 2

Construction
- Structure type: Elevated

Other information
- Status: Under construction
- Station code: APA

History
- Opened: February 2, 1892
- Closed: 1988
- Rebuilt: 2021–ongoing

Future services
Preceding station	PNR	Following station
San Fernando towards Clark International Airport	NSCR Commuter	Calumpit towards Calamba
San Fernando towards New Clark City	NSCR Commuter	Calumpit towards Tutuban
Location

Apalit station is an under-construction elevated North–South Commuter Railway (NSCR) station located in Apalit, Pampanga, Philippines. The station was part of the Philippine National Railways (PNR) North Main Line before its closure in the 1980s.

== History ==
The station opened in the 1890s as the first railway station serving Apalit. It has been used for passenger and freight transportation by the Manila Railroad Company (MRR) and Philippine National Railways (PNR). The station was to be rebuilt as a part of the Northrail project, which involved the upgrading of the existing single track to an elevated dual-track system, converting the rail gauge from narrow gauge to standard gauge, and linking Manila to Malolos in Bulacan and further on to Angeles City, Clark Special Economic Zone and Clark International Airport. The project commenced in 2007 but was repeatedly halted then discontinued in 2011.

The station is currently being rebuilt as part of the second phase of the North–South Commuter Railway. Partial operations are slated to begin by 2027.
