= Clark station =

Under-construction railway station in the Philippines

Clark
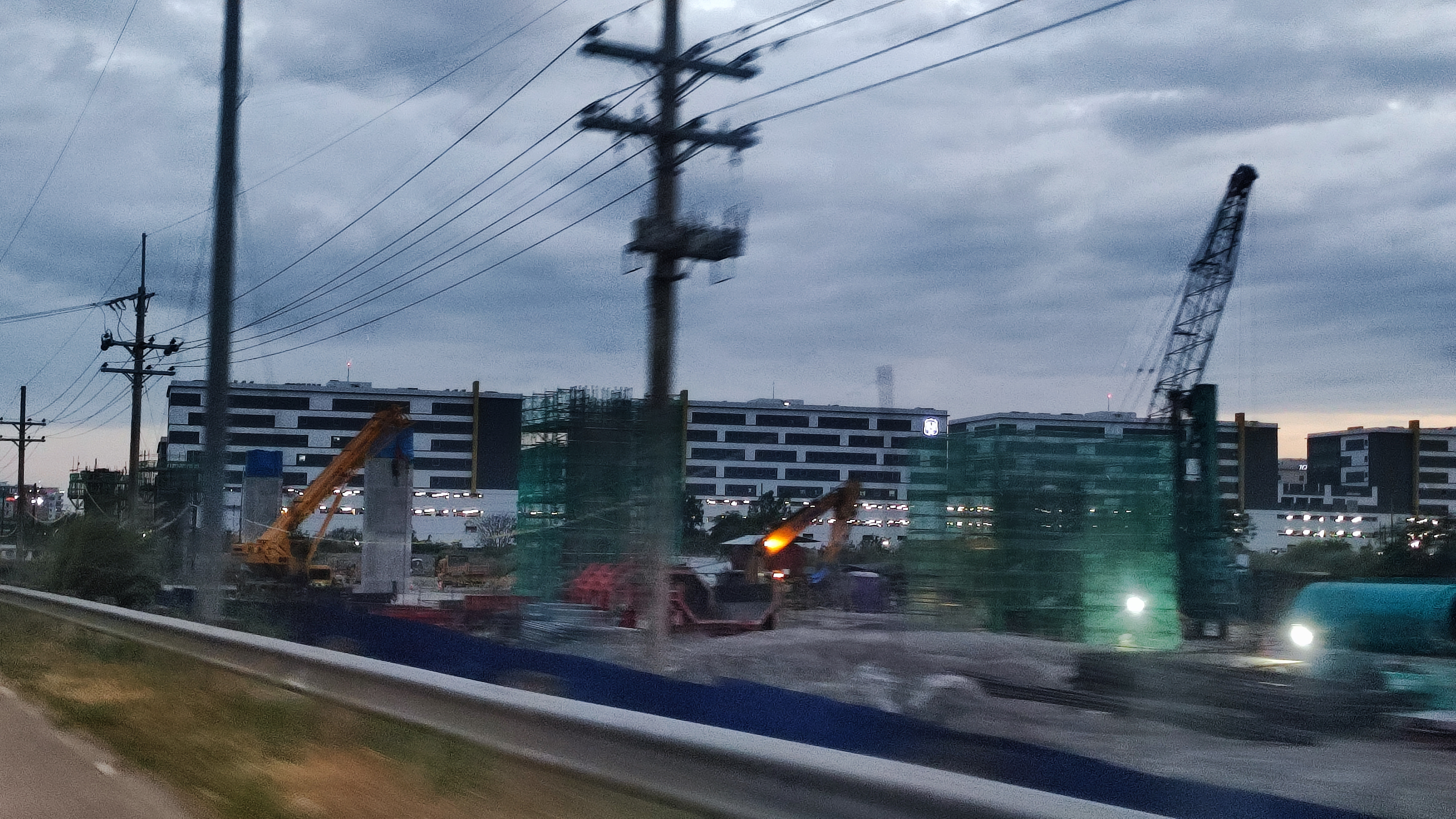

General information
- Location: Clark Freeport; Mabalacat, Pampanga; Philippines
- Coordinates: 15.1758°N 120.5816°E
- Owner: Philippine National Railways
- Operator: Philippine National Railways
- Line: North Commuter
- Platforms: Island platform
- Tracks: 4

Construction
- Structure type: Elevated

Other information
- Status: Under construction (started 2021)

Services
| Preceding station | PNR | Following station |
|---|---|---|
| New Clark City Terminus | NSCR Commuter NCC–Tutuban | Angeles towards Tutuban |
| Clark International Airport Terminus | NSCR Commuter CIA–Calamba | Angeles towards Calamba |
| New Clark City Terminus | Commuter Express NCC–Tutuban | San Fernando towards Tutuban |
| Clark International Airport Terminus | Commuter Express CIA–Calamba | San Fernando towards Calamba |
Location

Clark station is an under-construction elevated North–South Commuter Railway (NSCR) station located in Mabalacat, Pampanga, Philippines.

The station is situated within the Clark Freeport and Special Economic Zone. Adjacent to the station is SM City Clark, where an intermodal terminal is currently under construction.

== History ==
A rail link from Clark International Airport to Metro Manila was originally planned in the 1990s. The first proposal, called the "Manila–Clark rapid railway system", was discontinued due to disagreement on funding. In the early 2000s, the NorthRail project was pursued. This involved the conversion the rail gauge from narrow gauge to standard gauge, and linking Manila to Malolos, Bulacan and eventually to Clark and its airport. The project was discontinued in 2011 due to allegations of overpricing, and was replaced by the current North–South Commuter Railway project. The station is being constructed as part of the second phase of the NSCR. Partial operations are slated to begin by 2027.
