= Angeles station =

Railway station in the Philippines

Angeles
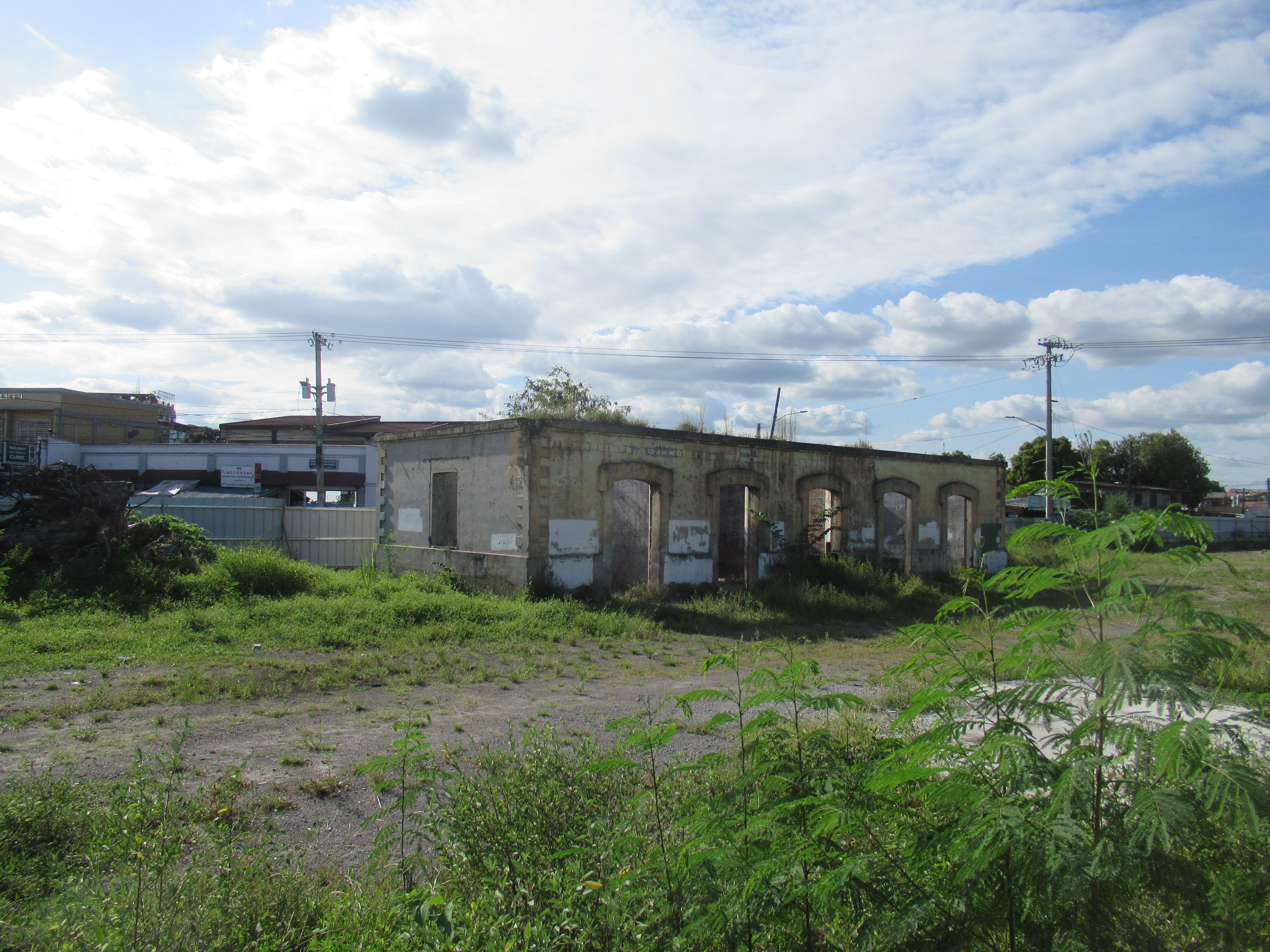
- Angeles station building ruins, 2022

General information
- Location: MacArthur Highway, Tabun; Angeles City, Pampanga; Philippines
- Owner: Philippine National Railways
- Operator: Philippine National Railways
- Lines: Planned: North Commuter; Former: North Main Line
- Platforms: Island platform
- Tracks: 4

Construction
- Structure type: Elevated

Other information
- Status: Under construction
- Station code: ANG

History
- Opened: 1892
- Closed: 1988
- Rebuilt: 2021–ongoing

Services
| Preceding station | PNR | Following station |
|---|---|---|
| Clark towards Clark International Airport | NSCR Commuter CIA–Calamba | San Fernando towards Calamba |
| Clark towards New Clark City | NSCR Commuter NCC–Tutuban | San Fernando towards Tutuban |
Location

Angeles station is an under-construction elevated North–South Commuter Railway (NSCR) station located in Angeles, Pampanga, Philippines.

The station was part of the Philippine National Railways (PNR) North Main Line before its closure in the 1980s.

== History ==
The station has been used for passenger and freight transportation notably by Manila Railroad Company and the Philippine National Railways (PNR).

In April 1942, during World War II, local residents threw food and drinks into wagons filled with US and Filipino soldiers being transported by the Imperial Japanese Army.

The station ceased to operate after the North Main Line was closed in 1988. Since then, the local government has converted the area into a park.

The station was to be rebuilt as a part of the Northrail project, which involved the upgrading of the existing single track to an elevated dual-track system, converting the rail gauge from narrow gauge to standard gauge, and linking Manila to Malolos in Bulacan and further on to Angeles City, Clark Special Economic Zone and Clark International Airport. The project commenced in 2007, but was repeatedly halted then discontinued in 2011.

The station is currently being rebuilt as part of the second phase of the North–South Commuter Railway. Partial operations are planned to begin by 2027.
