= Clark, Philippines =

Clark may refer to the following areas in the Philippines:

- Clark Air Base, a former American air base on Luzon Island, now used by the Philippine Air Force.
- Clark Freeport and Special Economic Zone (CFEZ), an area in Central Luzon spanning Tarlac and Pampanga
  - Clark Global City, a planned development in Mabalacat, Pampanga, within the Clark Freeport Zone
  - New Clark City, a planned development in Capas and Bamban, Tarlac, within the Clark Special Economic Zone
- Metro Clark, an area roughly covering portions of Tarlac and Pampanga

== See also ==
- Clark International Airport, in Clark Freeport and Special Economic Zone
- Clark International Speedway, a racing circuit in Clark Freeport and Special Economic Zone
