= Dong-Ah Geological Engineering =

South Korean engineering company

Dong-Ah Geological Engineering Co. Ltd.
- Native name: 동아지질
- Company type: Public
- Traded as: KRX: 028100
- Industry: Construction
- Founded: March 1971; 55 years ago
- Headquarters: 347 Geumsaem-ro, Geumjeong District, Busan, South Korea
- Area served: Worldwide
- Key people: Cho Ho-jin (CEO)
- Services: Civil engineering; Construction
- Website: Official website

Dong-Ah Geological Engineering Co. Ltd. (Korean: 동아지질) is a civil engineering company of South Korea. Its headquarters is in Geumjeong District, Busan.

== History ==
On June 12, 2009, it was listed on the KOSPI with Daewoo Securities as the lead manager.

In 2024, it succeeded in manufacturing a tunnel boring machine (TBM) using its own technology.

== Construction ==
In South Korea, it has participated in projects such as the Incheon Airport Terminal 2 connecting railway TBM, Seoul Subway Line 9, Geoga Bridge immersed tunnel soft ground improvement project, and Busan New Port and Ulsan New Port ground improvement project.

In Hong Kong, it was in charge of the New Town reclamation project and the ground improvement and expansion project for the third runway of Hong Kong International Airport.

Currently, it is in charge of the construction of the North–South Commuter Railway in the Philippines.
