= San Fernando station (Pampanga) =

Defunct station of the Philippine National Railways (PNR) Northrail line in Pampanga

Coordinates: 15°1′36.6″N 120°41′12.15″E

San Fernando
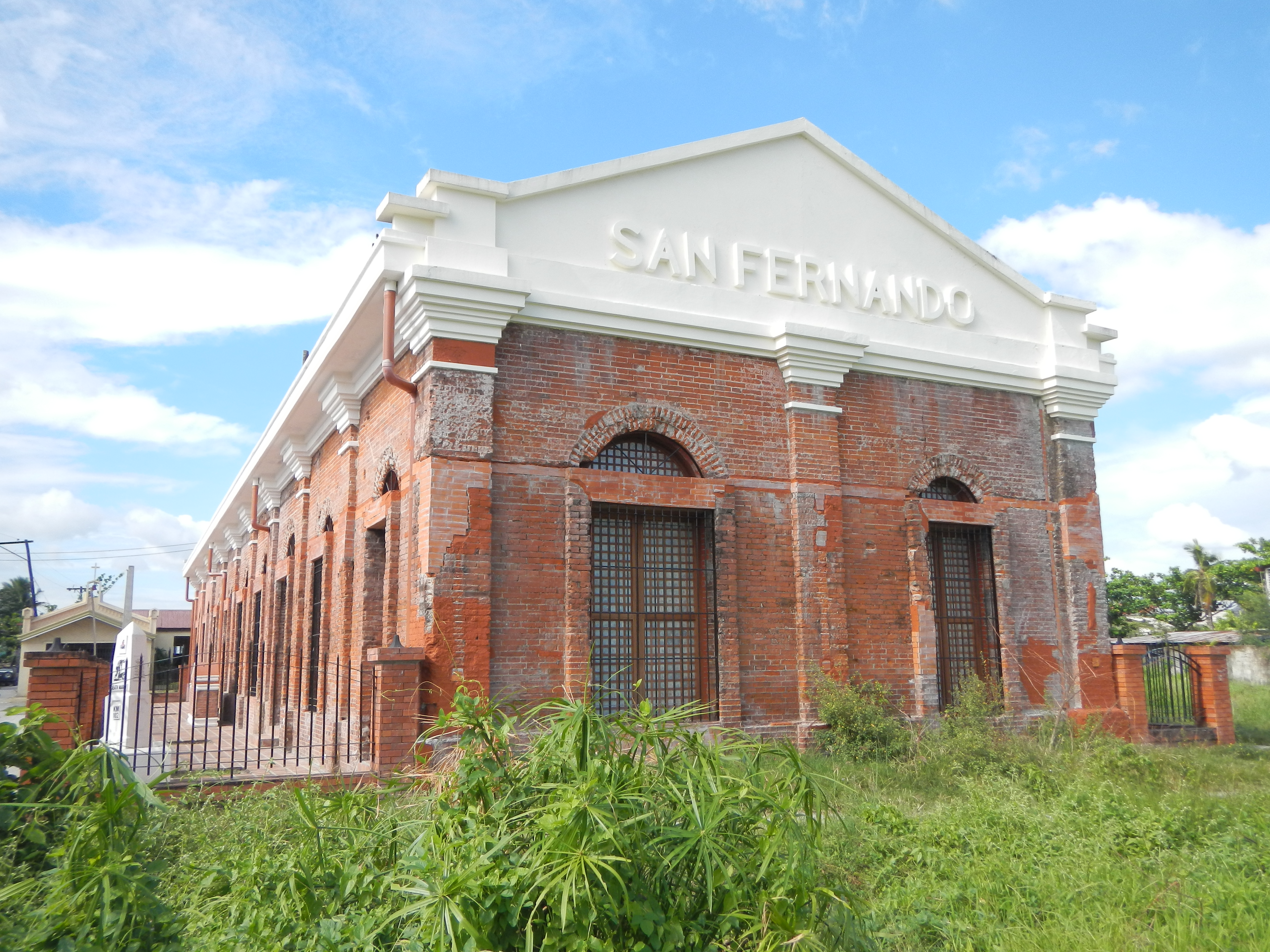

General information
- Location: San Fernando, Pampanga; Philippines
- Owner: Philippine National Railways
- Operator: Philippine National Railways
- Lines: Planned: North Commuter; Former: North Main Line
- Platforms: Island platform (New station)
- Tracks: 4 (New station)

Construction
- Structure type: At grade (Old station); Elevated (New station)
- Parking: no
- Cycle facilities: no

Other information
- Status: Closed (Old station); Under construction (New station)
- Station code: SFN

History
- Opened: February 23, 1892
- Closed: 1988 (Old station)
- Rebuilt: 2021-present (New station)

Future services
Preceding station	PNR	Following station
Angeles towards Clark International Airport	NSCR Commuter	Apalit towards Calamba
Angeles towards New Clark City	NSCR Commuter	Apalit towards Tutuban
Location

San Fernando station is an under-construction elevated North–South Commuter Railway (NSCR) station located in San Fernando, Pampanga, Philippines.

The station was part of the Philippine National Railways (PNR) North Main Line before its closure in the 1980s. It was also the site of a stopping place for Filipino and American prisoners of war during the Bataan Death March in 1942. The old station, one of the few preserved, is a significant city landmark and now functions as a museum.

== History ==
The station was inaugurated by Governor-General Eulogio Despujol and Bernardino Nozaleda, the Archbishop of Manila, on February 23, 1892. On June 27, 1892, José Rizal disembarked from this station to meet some recruits for La Liga Filipina and again the next day en route to Bacolor. In April 1942, during the Bataan Death March, the station served as the ending point for the 102-kilometer (63-mile) march from Bataan, from which Filipino and American prisoners-of-war were carted to Capas in Tarlac en route to their final destination, Camp O'Donnell.

The station has been closed since the ending of northbound rail services by Philippine National Railways (PNR) in 1988.

The station was to be rebuilt as a part of the Northrail project, which involved the upgrading of the existing single track to an elevated dual-track system, converting the rail gauge from narrow gauge to standard gauge, and linking Manila to Malolos in Bulacan and further on to Angeles City, Clark Special Economic Zone and Clark International Airport. The project commenced in 2007, but was repeatedly halted then discontinued in 2011.

The station is currently being rebuilt as part of the second phase of the North–South Commuter Railway. As part of the project, the old station will also be preserved. Partial operations are slated to begin by 2027.

== Gallery ==
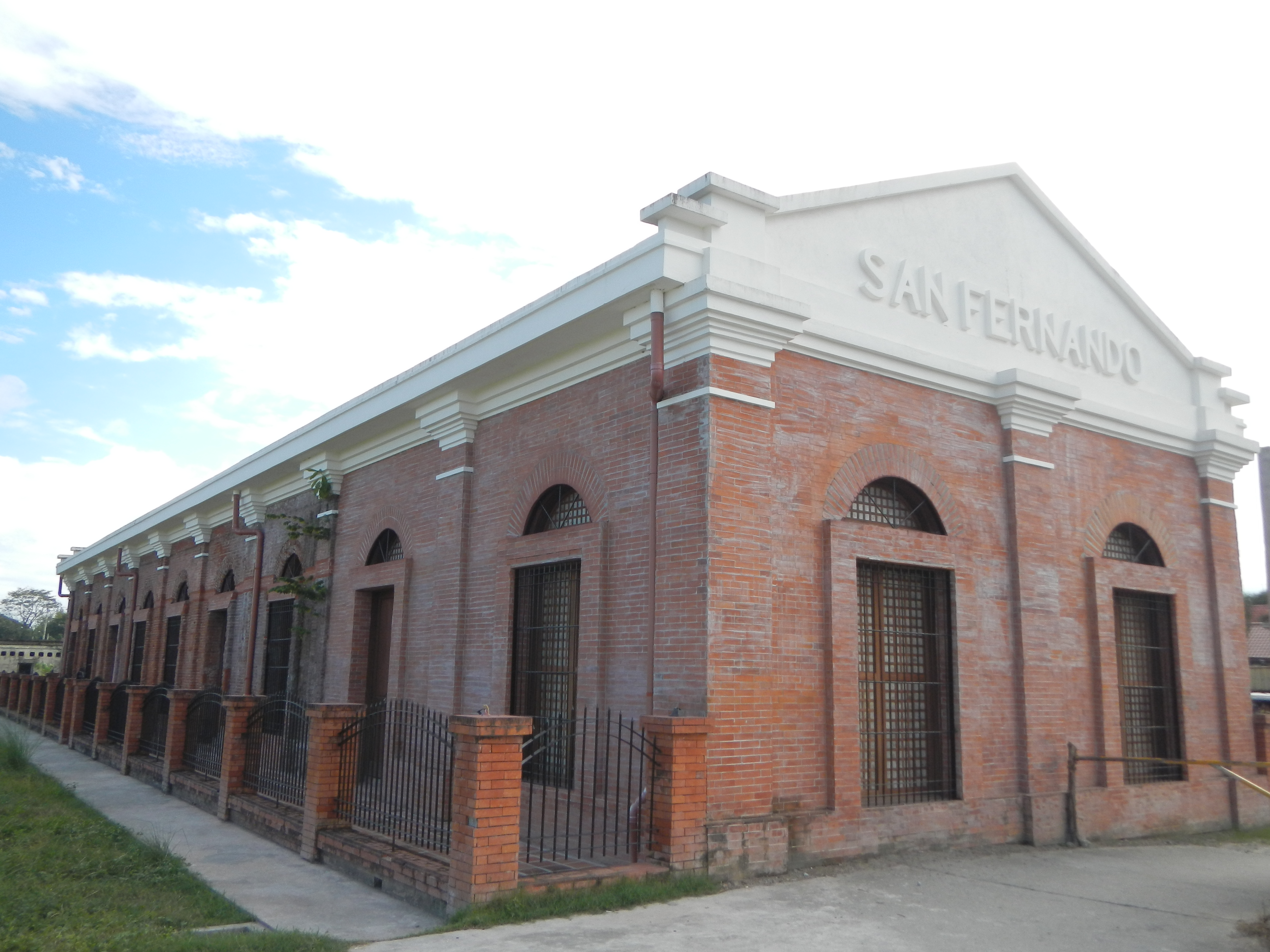
Façade of the train station

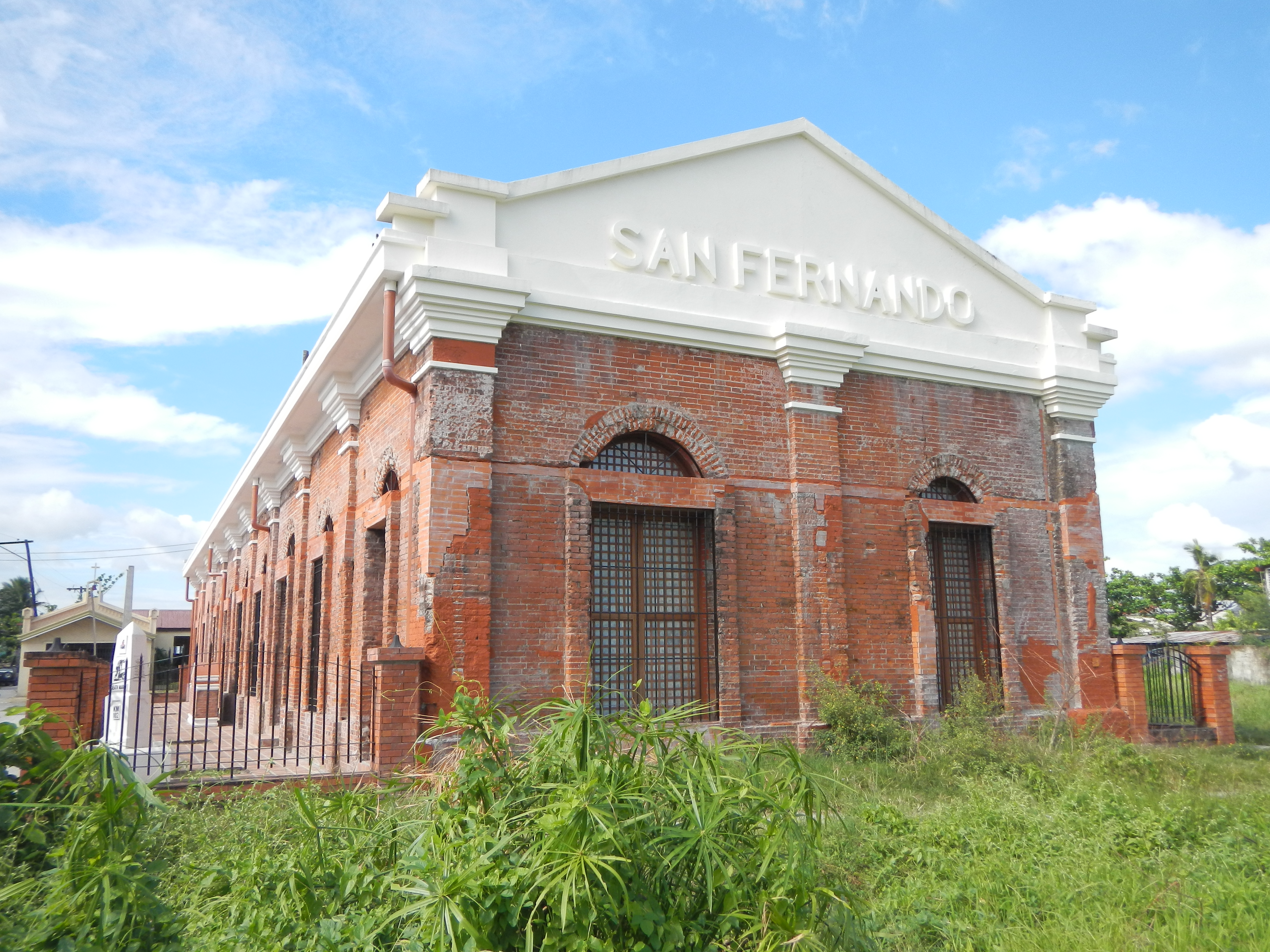
Frontage

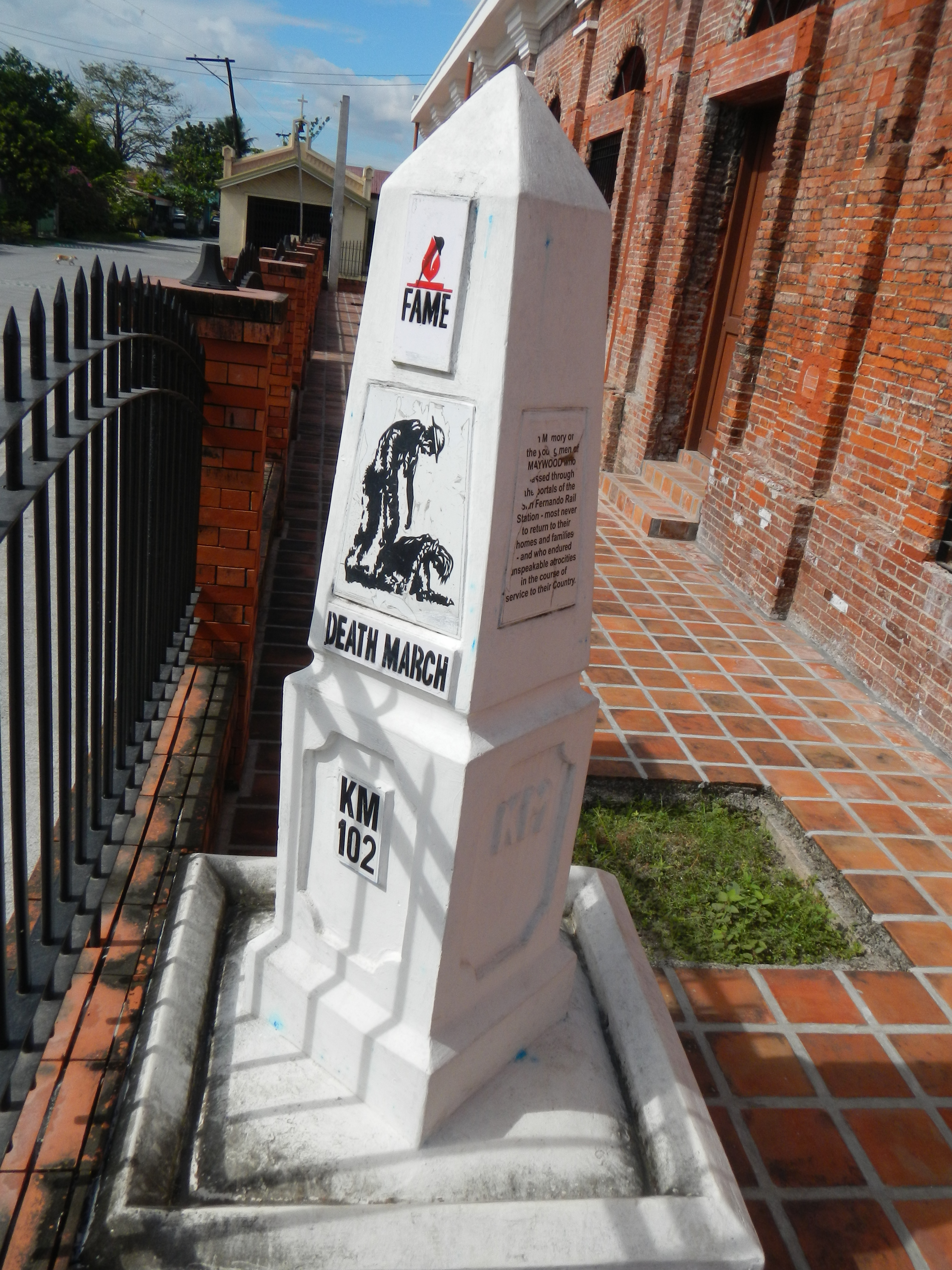
Death March marker in the station

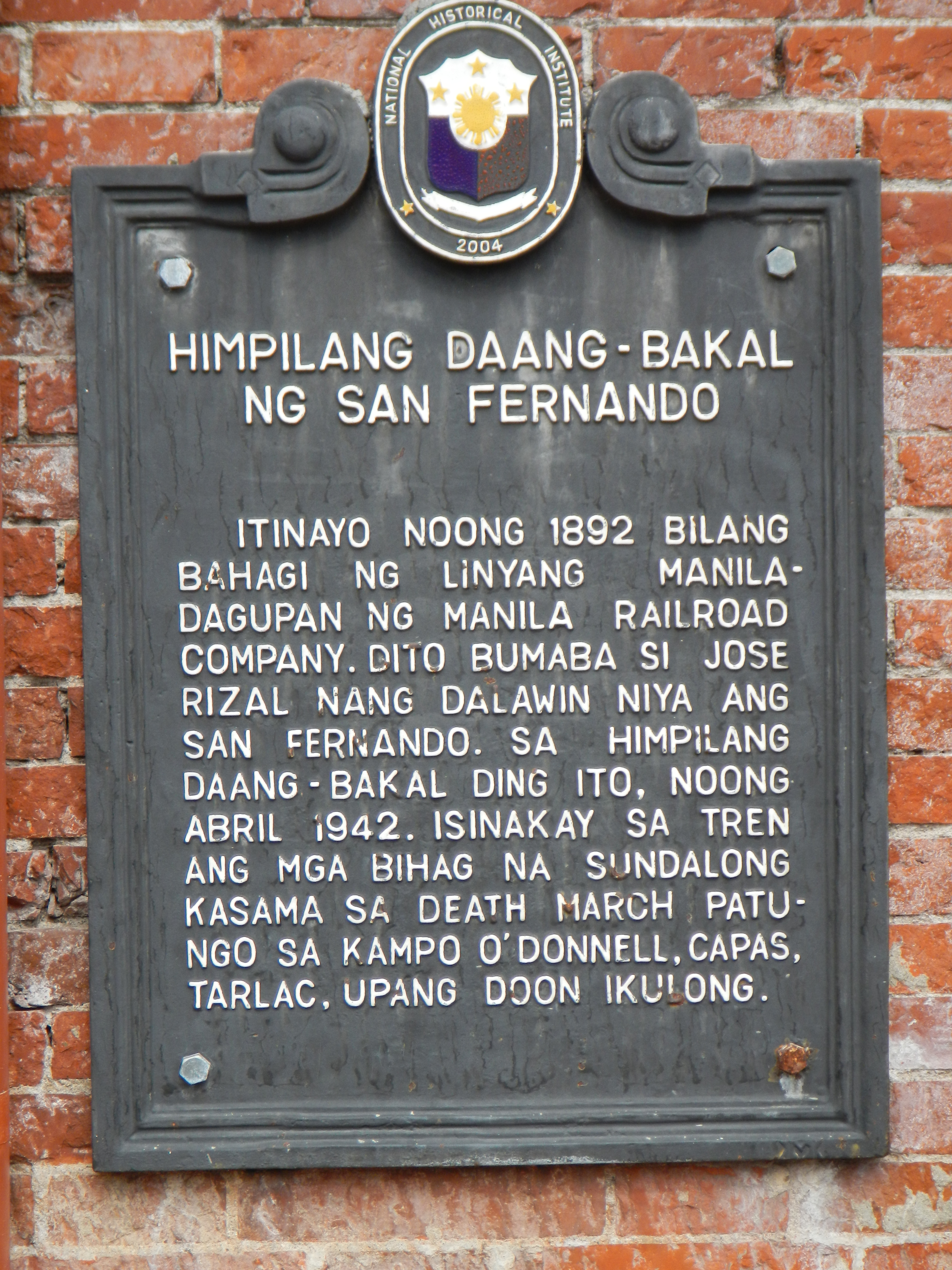
Station historical marker (2004)

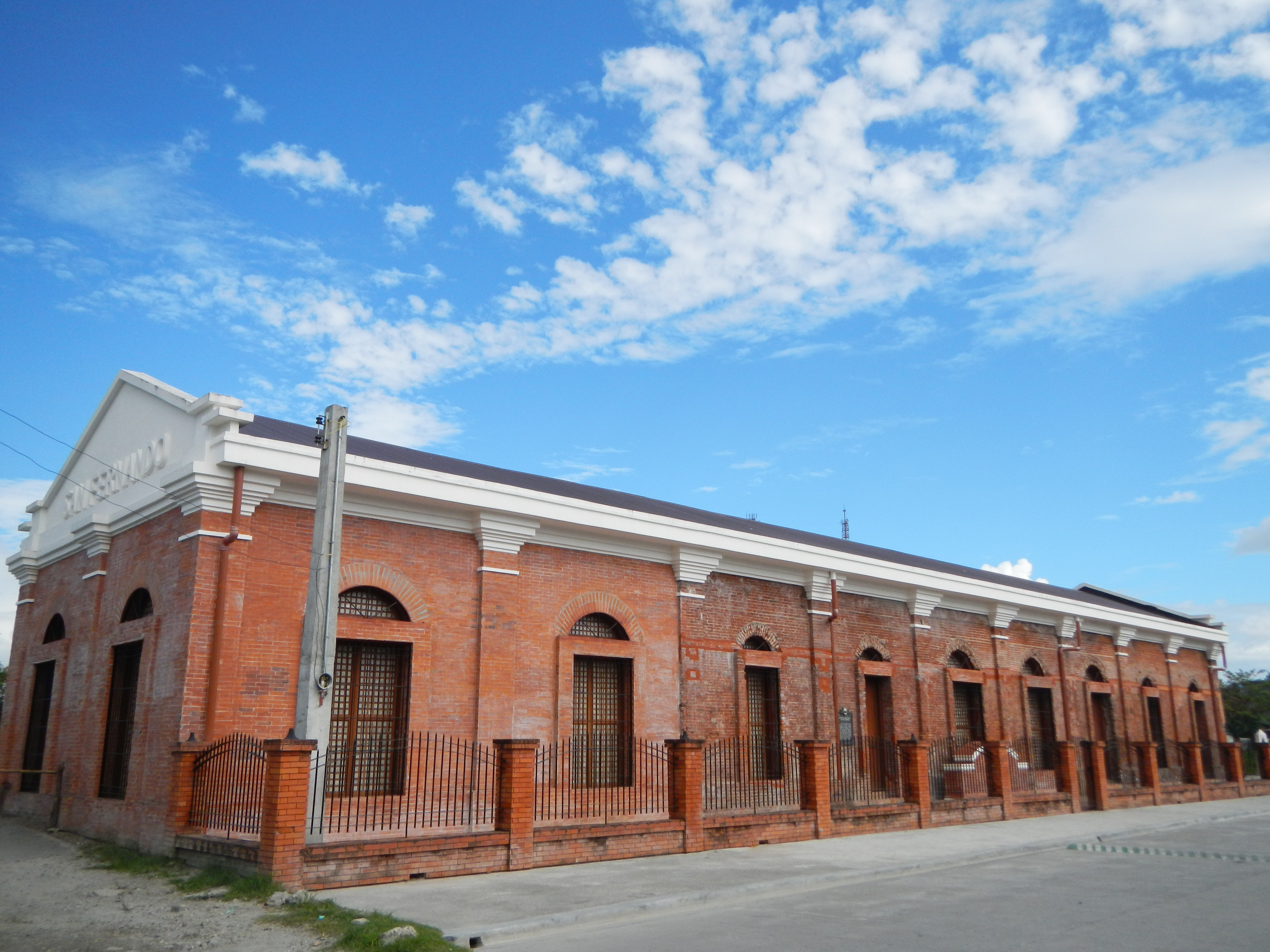
Rear view

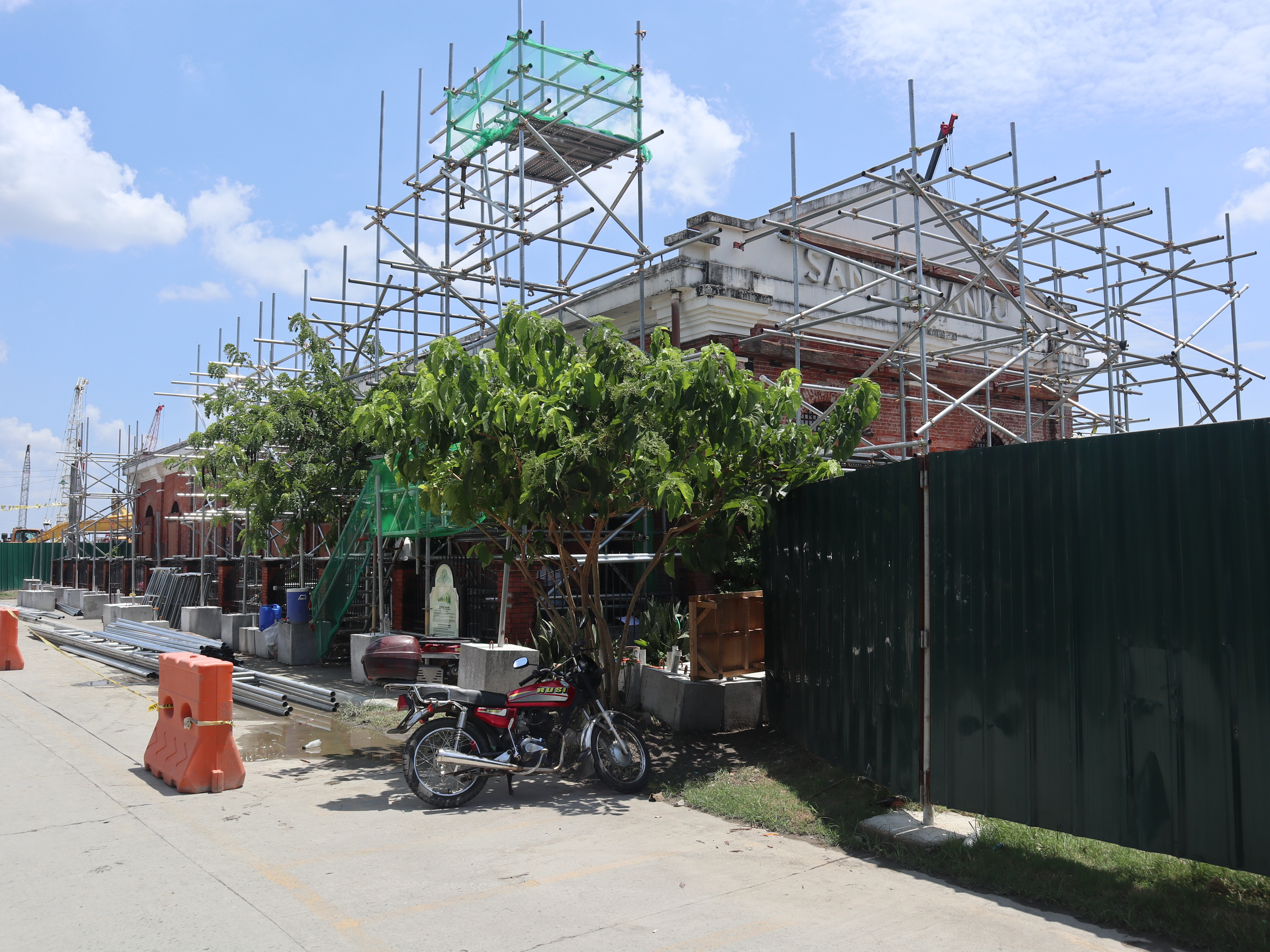
The station in 2023.
