= North–South Commuter Railway =

Commuter rail under construction in Luzon, Philippines

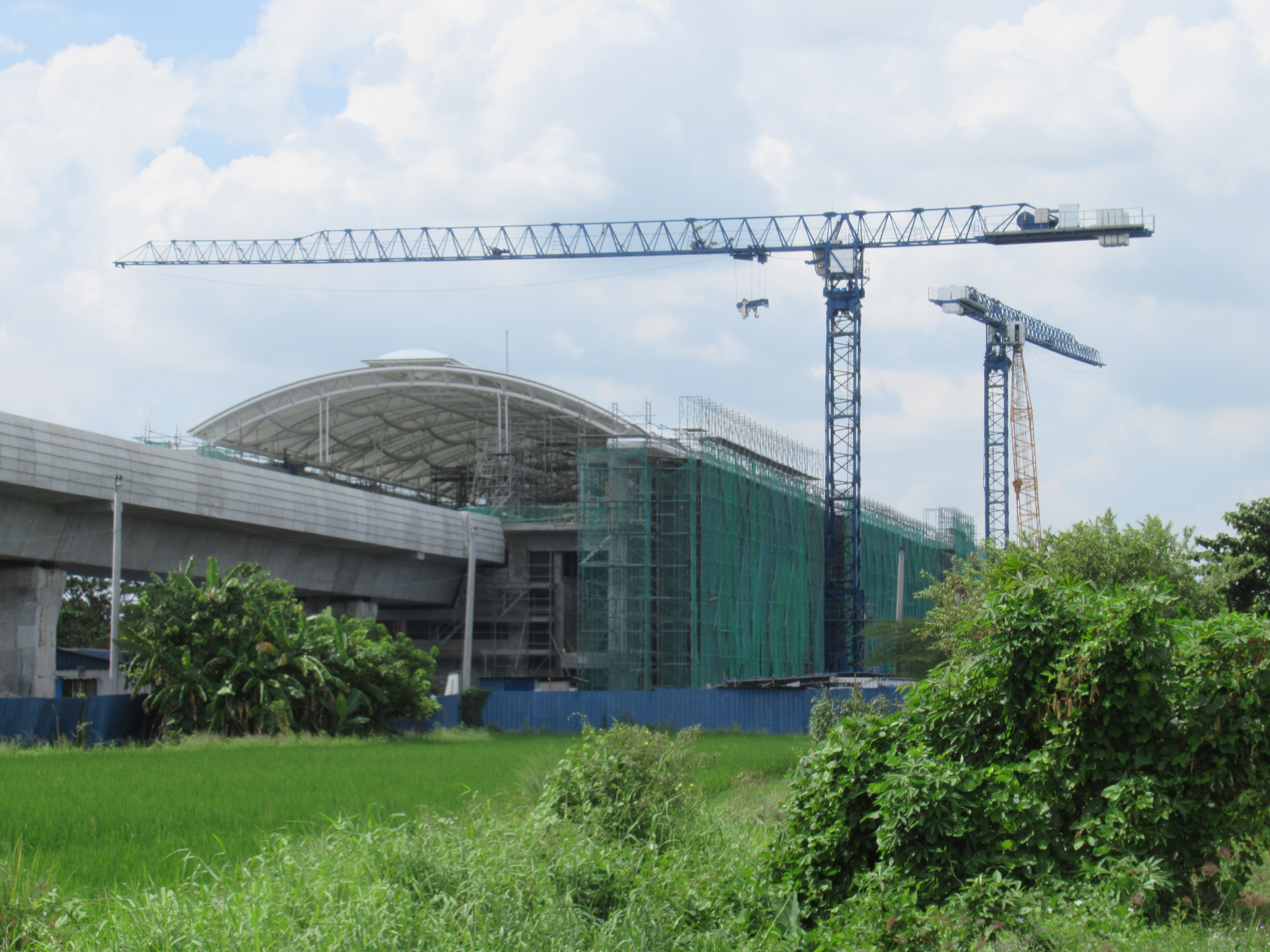
- Construction of the railway in Balagtas, Bulacan

Overview
- Status: Valenzuela to Clark and Manila to Calamba segments: Under construction Valenzuela to Solis segment: Construction pending (Note: If the segment's right of way is not cleared, relocation of informal settlers fails, and bidding has not yet taken place, buses and jeepneys will serve as an alternative solution, with routes from West Valenzuela to other rail lines.)
- Owner: Department of Transportation
- Locale: Central Luzon; Metro Manila; Calabarzon
- Termini: New Clark City Clark International Airport Tutuban; Calamba
- Continues from: PNR Metro Commuter Line (Solis to Calamba only)
- Stations: 36
- Website: https://nscr.com.ph

Service
- Type: Commuter rail; Airport rail link
- System: Philippine National Railways
- Services: 4
- Operator: Philippine National Railways
- Depot(s): Malanday (Note: Main depot); Mabalacat; Banlic
- Rolling stock: Various, see rolling stock

History
- Work began: February 15, 2019; 7 years ago
- Planned opening: 2028; 2 years' time (Valenzuela to Malolos); 2029; 3 years' time (Malolos to Clark); 2033; 7 years' time (full) (Note: The project will be implemented in three phases, which will have their own opening dates.)

Technical
- Line length: 147 km (91 mi)
- Num of tracks: Double (Note: May use quadruple-track at stations.)
- Character: Elevated (Note: May be through viaduct or embankment. Also includes an at-grade section between EDSA and FTI stations and an underground section around Clark International Airport station.)
- Track gauge: 1,435 mm (4 ft 8 1/2 in) standard gauge
- Loading gauge: 4,150 mm × 3,000 mm (13 ft 7 in × 9 ft 10 in)
- Minimum radius: Mainline: 260–400 m (850–1,310 ft); Depot: 92–100 m (302–328 ft)
- Electrification: 1,500 V DC overhead lines
- Operating speed: Commuter: 120 km/h (75 mph); Airport Express: 160 km/h (100 mph)
- Signalling: Hitachi Rail STS/Alstom Atlas 200 ETCS-2 (Note: Hitachi Rail STS will supply ETCS Level 2 equipment along Phase 1 between Tutuban and Malolos, while Alstom's Atlas 200 was selected for the Malolos–Clark and NSCR South segments.)
- Highest elevation: 130 m (430 ft) at Clark International Airport station
- Maximum incline: 25‰
- Average inter-station distance: 4.11 km (2.55 mi)

The North–South Commuter Railway (Note: Tagalog: Daambakal Pangmananakay na Pahilaga–Timog; Kapampangan: Dalang Bakal ning Pamanyakeng Papangulu–Mauli) (NSCR), also known as the Clark–Calamba Railway, is a 147-kilometer (91-mile) commuter rail system under construction on the island of Luzon in the Philippines. Running from New Clark City in Capas, Tarlac, to Calamba, Laguna, with 36 stations and four services, the railway is designed to improve connectivity within the Greater Manila Area and will be integrated with the railway network in the region.

Originally planned in the 1990s, the railway project has had a tumultuous history, being repeatedly halted and restarted for various reasons. The first proposals were the 32-kilometer (20-mile) "Manila–Clark rapid railway" with Spain in the 1990s, alongside the "Manila–Calabarzon Express". During the 2000s, the Northrail project with China was initiated but discontinued in 2011 due to allegations of overpricing. The railway's current incarnation began development in 2013. The project's initial phase was approved in 2015, and construction began in 2019.

Expected to cost ₱873.62 billion, the line is the most expensive railway transportation project in the country. The entire system is expected to be completed by the third quarter of 2033.

== History ==
=== Background ===
Comparison between NSCR and its predecessor projects
Segment	MMUTIS		Northrail	NSCR
Calamba–Caloocan	Manila–Calabarzon Express (MCX)		none (Note: Segment is covered by the Northrail–Southrail Linkage, of which only the segment from Caloocan to Alabang was completed.)	PNR Clark; PNR Calamba
Fort Bonifacio–Caloocan	Manila–Clark Rapid Railway System (MCRRS)	Phase 1	Phase 3	none
Caloocan–Malolos	Manila–Clark Rapid Railway System (MCRRS)	Phase 1	Phase 1	PNR Clark
Malolos–Clark	Manila–Clark Rapid Railway System (MCRRS)	Phase 1	Phase 1	PNR Clark
Clark–San Fernando	Manila–Clark Rapid Railway System (MCRRS)	Phase 3	Phase 4	none (Note: Segment is covered by the PNR North Long Haul.)
San Fernando–Laoag	Manila–Clark Rapid Railway System (MCRRS)	Phase 4	none	none
Subic spur	Manila–Clark Rapid Railway System (MCRRS)	Phase 2	Phase 2	none (Note: Segment is covered by the Subic–Clark Railway.)
San Jose spur	Manila–Clark Rapid Railway System (MCRRS)	Phase 4	none	none (Note: Segment is covered by the PNR Northeast Commuter Line.)

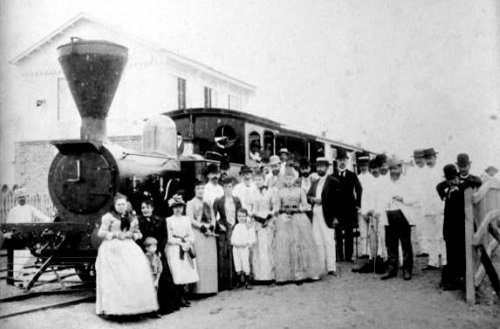
The Ferrocarril de Manila a Dagupan operated trains to and from Manila

During the Spanish and American colonial periods, the Manila Railway Company, later the Manila Railroad Company (MRR), operated various local trains between Manila and its neighboring provinces. By the 1920s, trains had run from Tutuban to Naic in Cavite, Pagsanjan in Laguna, Montalban in Rizal, and Bulacan. The network was heavily damaged in the Battle of Manila during World War II, but was mostly reestablished after the war. MRR was succeeded by the Philippine National Railways (PNR) on June 20, 1964.

On April 6, 1970, PNR inaugurated the Metro Manila Commuter Service, which started at Manila North Harbor and ended in Biñan station in Laguna. After numerous expansions, the commuter service served thousands of daily riders in its system and had an expansive network in and out of Metro Manila. In 1978, at the request of the Philippine government, the Japan International Cooperation Agency (JICA) conducted a study on the electrification of the commuter service. The plan was made to keep up with the increasing demand for transportation in the region. It called for the replacement of the diesel-run trains and the electrification of the PNR commuter line. Two experts from the Japanese National Railways were sent to conduct the study.

Services north of Manila started to decline in the 1980s. However, commuter services were briefly extended to Malolos starting in 1990 under the Metrotren project but later ceased in 1997. Since then, railway services have been mostly confined to the south, with the contemporary Metro Commuter Line being predominantly aligned to the South Main Line.

==== Proposals in the 1990s ====
In 1994, President Fidel Ramos signed an executive order designating Clark Air Base, as the premier international airport, with the support of the Bases Conversion and Development Authority (BCDA), while the other agencies also supported the development, and in the same year, President Ramos signed a memorandum of agreement with Juan Carlos I of Spain for the construction of a railway line from Manila to Clark. This would be known as the Manila–Clark rapid railway system (MCRRS). A joint venture agreement was entered into on June 10, 1995, between BCDA, PNR, Philippine companies DMCI Holdings and Fort Bonifacio Development Corporation, and Spanish firms with Construcciones y Auxiliar de Ferrocarriles, Entrecanales y Tavora, Cubiertas y MZOV, (both companies later merged to form Acciona) and Cobra Instalaciones y Servicios, S.A., as well as other investors. The agreement also established the North Luzon Railways Corporation (NLRC) for the purpose of constructing, operating, and managing the railroad system on August 24. In 1996, Spanish and Japanese companies entered the bidding process, while the project would have also been co-financed by the Overseas Economic Cooperation Fund (OECF, later Japan Bank for International Cooperation or JBIC, now JICA). The NLRC then entered into an engineering, procurement and construction contract with the Spanish Railways Corporation on February 7 of the same year. Meanwhile, in 1997, Ayala Land proposed the construction of a railway known as the Manila–Calabarzon Express (MCX). Its initial phase involved the rehabilitation of the railway from Caloocan to Calamba and eventually the construction of spur lines to Carmona and Canlubang under a build–own–operate scheme.

Studies indicated that the MCRRS project was planned to unfold in four phases. Phase 1, was set to connect Fort Bonifacio, including a proposed intermodal station in Bonifacio Global City, to the Clark Freeport and Special Economic Zone. Phase 2 aimed to extend the line to Subic Bay. Phase 3 planned for an extension to San Fernando, La Union. Phase 4 proposed another extension from San Fernando to Laoag and an additional spur line to San Jose, Nueva Ecija. Both proposals were subsequently included in the Metro Manila Urban Transportation Integration Study (MMUTIS).

The contract between the NLRC and the Spanish Railways Corporation was terminated on August 14, 1998, after the parties disagreed on the source of funding for the project.

Despite the contract termination, in September 1999, the National Economic and Development Authority (NEDA) approved the MCRRS, with the initial phase covering a segment from Caloocan to Calumpit. The source of funding was to be the Obuchi Fund from the JBIC. The consortium was also now joined by Japanese companies including Fil Estate Management, Nishimatsu Construction, and Mitsui & Co. Pre-construction activities such as right-of-way clearing and relocation of affected informal settlers began, but a presidential directive later halted the clearing activities. Then, JBIC later dumped the project because of the government could not commit to clear the railway path squatters before releasing a loan, causing a lack of funds.

Ayala Land was subsequently excluded from the MCX as the government opted to fund the railway construction also through the Obuchi Fund, opening the project for bidding to private developers. In April 2000, the JBIC Obuchi Fund provided a $300 million loan to tap the ₱18.2 billion project. By the following year, the Japanese government was considering funding the project.

Another study about the integration of Metro Manila's railway network by JICA in 2001 proposed the through-operation of both railways in two options, such as an elevated section running 10 kilometers (6.2 mi) on the existing PNR old right-of-way or an underground section running 7 kilometers (4.3 mi) from Tayuman to Vito Cruz. According to SIRNMM, the proposed indicative length, which would have run from Tayuman to Marilao, was 17.0 kilometers (10.6 mi), while both options for MCX were to be 46.2 kilometers (28.7 mi) (elevated) or 43.2 kilometers (26.8 mi) (underground) from Tayuman to Cabuyao. However, the plans would never materialize.

==== Northrail ====
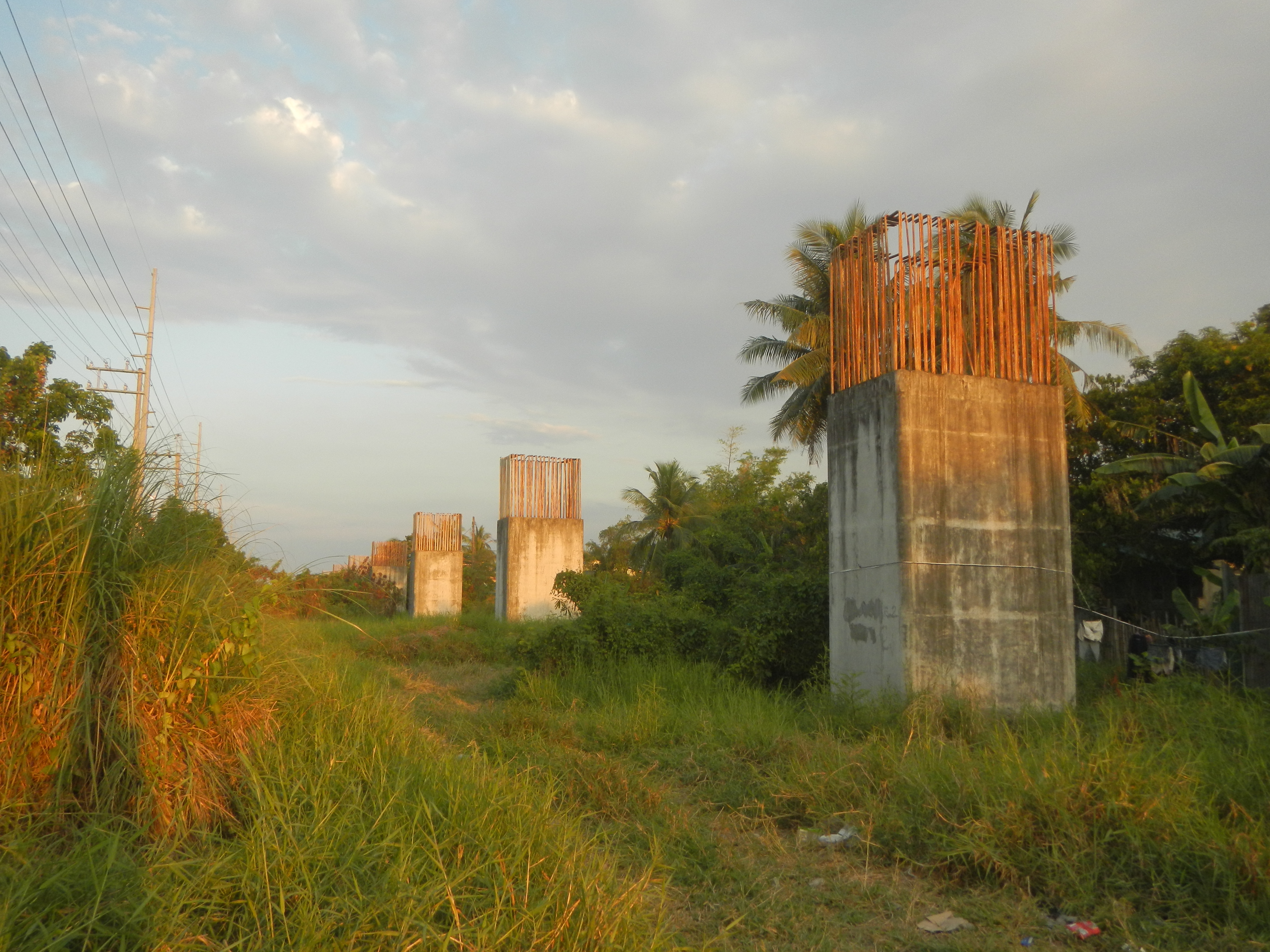
Abandoned Northrail columns in Malolos, Bulacan that have since been demolished.

Under the presidency of Gloria Macapagal Arroyo, the MCRRS was succeeded by the Northrail project, a 320-kilometer (200-mile) railway system from Caloocan to San Fernando, La Union. The Northrail project's 80-kilometer (50-mile) phase 1 involved the upgrading of the existing single track to an elevated dual-track system, converting the rail gauge from narrow gauge to standard gauge, and linking Manila to Malolos in Bulacan and further on to the Clark Freeport and Special Economic Zone and Clark International Airport. The first segment of phase 1 covered the 32-kilometer (20-mile) railway from Caloocan to Malolos. Succeeding phases followed the MCRRS masterplan, although Phase 4 was removed, Phase 3 was rebranded as Phase 4, and the section between Fort Bonifacio to Caloocan was rebranded as Phase 3, while Phase 2 was unchanged. Its southern counterpart, the Southrail project, involved the rehabilitation of the entire South Main Line from Calamba to Legazpi, Albay, with an extension to Matnog. Meanwhile, the Northrail–Southrail Linkage involved the rehabilitation of the existing Metro Commuter Line from Caloocan to Calamba, creating a link between the two systems.

On September 14, 2002, a memorandum of understanding was signed by NLRC and China National Machinery and Equipment Group (CNMEG) for the project. It was later approved on August 5, 2003. The project was estimated to cost around US$500 million, and the funding was to be covered by a US$400 million loan from the Export–Import Bank of China, and the rest to be shouldered by the government through BCDA and NLRC. The Southrail project was also expected to be financed by loans from China, while the linkage project was to be financed by South Korea. While the plans for Southrail were not realized, the initial phase of the linkage project from Caloocan to Alabang was completed in December 2010.

Before Northrail's construction could start, the project became embroiled in controversy as the Philippine Senate raised concerns about alleged corruption in the project. Senator Franklin Drilon commissioned a study from the University of the Philippines, which recommended the cancellation of the railway's construction, citing anomalies in the bidding process and the Buyer Credit Loan Agreement (BCLA) with Exim China. Despite the controversy, preparatory construction began in early November 2006. Civil and design works started in October 2007. However, CNMEG reportedly demobilized from the project on July 1, 2008, due to differences on engineering and construction standards, although this was later retracted.

Due to delays in the construction work, it was soon renegotiated with the Chinese government. Construction temporarily continued in January 2009 with the support of the North Luzon Railways Corporation. However, the project would be shelved in March 2010 due to persisting legal issues and allegations of overpricing and corruption. In 2011, Northrail was cancelled by the government under the presidency of Benigno Aquino III. Like the failed Hopewell Project in Bangkok, a few structures had been completed by the time of its cancellation. The government contemplated reusing the completed structures from the project, but ultimately, this was not implemented.

In September 2011, the government expressed its interest to restart the project with China reportedly open to reconfigure the project. In March 2012, the Philippine Supreme Court authorized a lower court to hear the case for voiding the contract. Instead of paying the US$184 million owed by the government in 2012, the Department of Finance was to pay Exim China four installments of US$46 million from September 2012 onwards. In August 2012, the Chinese and Philippine governments agreed to "disengage" from the project, although the Philippine government was still obligated to pay the corresponding loans. On November 6, 2017, DOTr, BCDA, and NLRC reached an out-of-court settlement with Sinomach (formerly CNMEG), resolving the five-year dispute. It saved the government ₱5 billion in potential payment of claims to Sinomach and hundreds of millions of pesos in legal fees and arbitration costs.

The Governance Commission for GOCCs (GCG) ordered the deactivation of NLRC in May 2019. According to GCG, the company was "not producing the desired outcomes, no longer achieving the objectives and purposes for which it was designed and created, and not cost efficient and does not generate the level of social, physical and economic returns vis-à-vis the resource inputs." On October 19, 2023, NLRC was formally abolished, with the BCDA to act as the administrator and liquidator of NLRC and settle its liabilities.

=== Development ===
With the termination of the Northrail project, the Department of Transportation and Communications considered restarting the project by commissioning a feasibility study by CPCS Transcom Ltd. of Canada. Part of the study examined having a Malolos–Tutuban–Calamba–Los Baños commuter line. The feasibility study was still ongoing when the NEDA included the project in the Metro Manila Dream Plan, which it approved in 2014. JICA also conducted a new study a year before a new transport infrastructure master plan was published. This plan calls for an airport express railway linking Ninoy Aquino International Airport in Metro Manila to Clark International Airport with a total length of 99.4 kilometers (61.8 mi). The government also examined building a railway on top of the North Luzon Expressway instead of using the PNR right of way, which was still allocated for the Northrail project at the time.

By August 2014, the Northrail project was reinitiated as the North–South Commuter Railway (NSCR) and awaited approval. On February 16, 2015, the NEDA board, chaired by President Aquino, approved the NSCR Phase 1 as part of the North–South Railway Project (NSRP). The NSCR, a part of the NSRP north line's first phase, was a 37-kilometer (23-mile) electrified narrow gauge commuter railway from Tutuban to Malolos, funded through overseas development assistance. Other components of NSRP masterplan include the reconstruction of the existing Metro Commuter line and the reestablishment of long-haul services to northern and southern Luzon, all of which were to be funded through a public–private partnership (PPP) scheme. After President Aquino met with Japanese Prime Minister Shinzo Abe in Japan in June 2015, Abe expressed his commitment to fund the project. On November 19, 2015, representatives of both countries exchanged notes on the project in the presence of Abe and Aquino. JICA was chosen by the Japanese government to look into financing the project, and on November 27, JICA and the Department of Finance signed a loan agreement worth ₱97.3 billion ($1.99 billion) for the financing of the first phase.

Before the inauguration of President Rodrigo Duterte, Aquino's successor, Chinese diplomats reportedly offered to construct the railway from Manila to Clark within two years. However, his administration continued the NSCR project with Japan and included the project under its flagship Build! Build! Build! Infrastructure Program. On June 25, 2017, transportation secretary Arthur Tugade unveiled the locations of the first five stations during a press tour of the old PNR line. In addition, numerous changes to the project were made. The railway's gauge was changed to standard gauge, and the railway was extended to New Clark City. The south commuter line, now under the NSCR project as the North–South Commuter Railway Extension Project (NSCR-Ex), shifted from a PPP scheme in favor of overseas development assistance from Japan and later the Asian Development Bank (ADB). The long-haul segment of the south line was separated under a new project known as the PNR South Long Haul.

On January 21, 2019, a loan agreement worth ₱80.47 billion (US$1.54 billion) for the NSCR-Ex, which includes the PNR Clark 2 and Calamba sections, was signed by JICA and the Department of Finance (DOF). Another loan agreement worth ₱66.6 billion (US$1.3 billion) for the NSCR-Ex project was signed on July 11 by the ADB and DOF. JICA would finance the electrical and mechanical systems as well as the trains for the PNR Clark 2 and Calamba sections, while ADB would finance the civil works.

The loan for the civil works of PNR Calamba, worth ₱227 billion (US$4.3 billion), was approved by the ADB on June 9, 2022. The loan agreement was signed by President Duterte and ADB on June 16. Two more loan agreements were signed on February 9, 2023, during the working visit of President Bongbong Marcos in Japan.

=== Construction ===
List of contractors
Contract package	Scope of work	Contractors	Date awarded	Notes
Tutuban–Malolos segment (funded by JICA)
CP 01	Construction of Solis–Bocaue section	(Japan) Taisei Corporation (Philippines) DMCI	May 2019	VSL International, a subsidiary of Bouygues was appointed as the subcontractor for the construction of the viaduct.
CP 01	Construction of Solis–Bocaue section	TBD for Valenzuela to Solis segment		The Taisei-DMCI joint venture (TDJV) was originally awarded as the contractor for the segment before it was descoped as part of its revisions. However, the joint venture withdrew from that segment of the contract in May 2023 due to right of way issues. As of 2026, there has been no progress on this project's section.
CP 02	Construction of Bocaue–Malolos section	(Japan) Sumitomo Mitsui Construction	January 2019	
CP 03	Rolling stock for Tutuban–Malolos railway	(Japan) Sumitomo Corporation (Japan) J-TREC	July 2019	
CP 04	Electrical and mechanical (E&M) systems	(Italy) Hitachi Rail STS	November 2022	
CP 05	Construction of Tutuban–Solis section	TBD		Bidding ongoing, but as of 2026, there has been no progress on this project's section.
Malolos–Clark Railway (civil works funded by ADB)
CP N-01	Construction of Malolos–San Simon section	(Philippines) Megawide Construction Corporation (South Korea) Hyundai Engineering and Construction (South Korea) Dong-ah Geological Engineering Company	September 2020	
CP N-02	Construction of Santo Tomas–San Fernando, Pampanga section	(Spain) Acciona (South Korea) DL E&C	October 2020	
CP N-03	Construction of Mexico–Clark (Mabalacat) section	(Thailand) Italian-Thai Development Public Company Limited	October 2020	
CP N-04	Construction of Clark (Mabalacat)–Clark International Airport section	(Philippines) EEI Corporation (Spain) Acciona	August 2020	
CP N-05	Construction of 33-hectare (82-acre) depot and main operations control center in Mabalacat	(South Korea) POSCO	August 2020	
CP S-01	Construction of Solis–Blumentritt section (Blumentritt extension)	(Indonesia) PT Adhi Karya (Indonesia) PT PP	February 2023	
South Commuter Railway (civil works funded by ADB)
CP S-02	Construction of Blumentritt–Paco section	(Spain) Acciona (Philippines) DMCI	February 2023	
CP S-03a	Construction of Paco–Senate section	(Hong Kong) Leighton Contractors (Asia) (Philippines) First Balfour	June 2023	
CP S-03b	Construction of Senate–FTI section and tunneling works to Metro Manila Subway Senate station	(Hong Kong) Leighton Contractors (Asia) (Philippines) First Balfour	February 2023	
CP S-03c	Construction of FTI–Sucat section	(Indonesia) PT Adhi Karya (Indonesia) PT PP	June 2023	
CP S-04	Construction of Sucat–San Pedro section	(South Korea) Hyundai Engineering and Construction (South Korea) Dong-ah Geological Engineering Company	September 2022	
CP S-05	Construction of San Pedro–Cabuyao section	(South Korea) Hyundai Engineering and Construction (South Korea) Dong-ah Geological Engineering Company	September 2022	
CP S-06	Construction of Cabuyao–Calamba section	(South Korea) Hyundai Engineering and Construction (South Korea) Dong-ah Geological Engineering Company	September 2022	
CP S-07	Construction of Banlic depot	(South Korea) Lotte Engineering & Construction (Turkey) Gülermak (Philippines) EEI Corporation	September 2022	
Other associated contracts (funded by JICA)
CP NS-01	Electrical and mechanical (E&M) systems for Malolos–Clark and Manila–Calamba railways	(Japan) Mitsubishi Corporation (France) Alstom (France) (United Kingdom) Colas Rail	February 2023	
CP NS-02	Commuter rolling stock for Malolos–Clark and South Commuter railways	(Japan) Sumitomo Corporation (Japan) J-TREC	January 2022	
CP NS-03	Limited express trains	(Japan) Mitsubishi Corporation (Spain) Construcciones y Auxiliar de Ferrocarriles	October 2023	

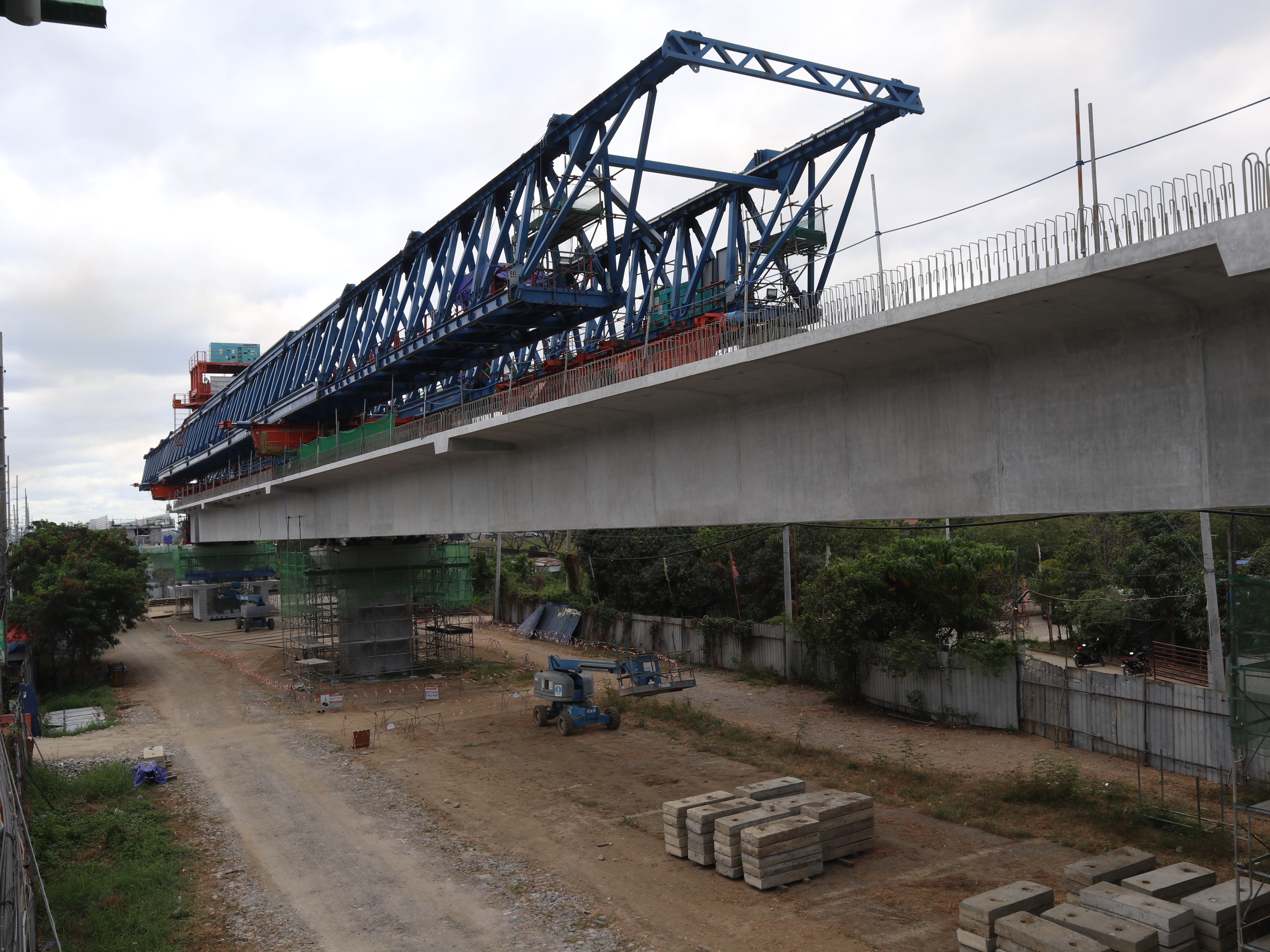
Construction of PNR Clark 1 in Malolos, Bulacan in February 2024

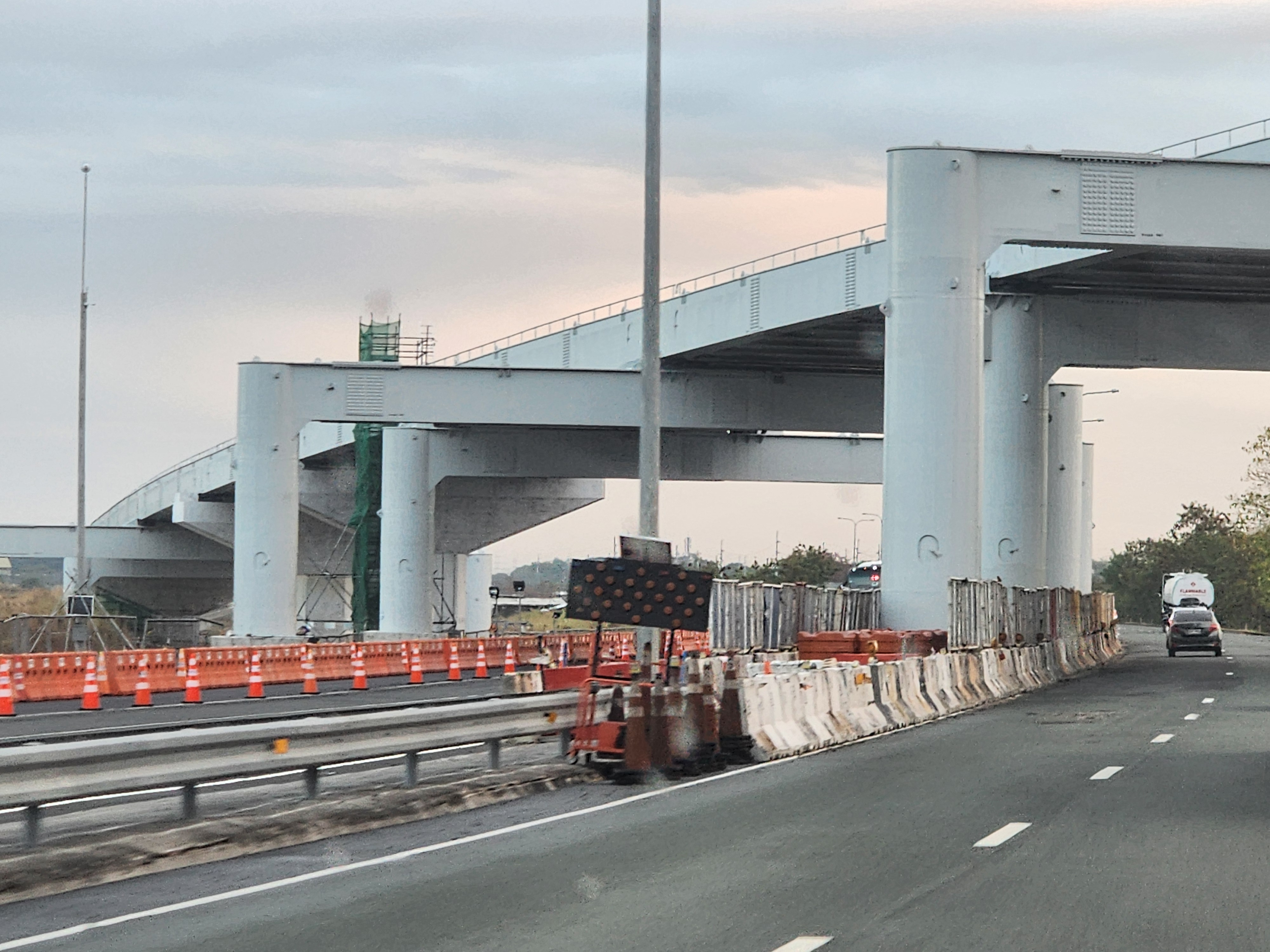
Construction of PNR Clark 2 in Mabalacat, Pampanga in March 2024

Construction was planned to begin in the last quarter of 2017, but pre-construction works, such as clearing of the right of way, were only started on January 5, 2018. The railway is being built in three phases and divided into two primary sections:

- PNR Clark — This is the northern section of the NSCR. Construction was divided into two phases. PNR Clark 1 involves the 38-kilometer (24-mile) Tutuban–Malolos railway, while PNR Clark 2 involves the 53-kilometer (33-mile) Malolos–Clark railway. The 91-kilometer (57-mile) railway line, when fully completed, will run from Tutuban station in Manila to New Clark City station within the Clark Freeport and Special Economic Zone, with a link to Clark International Airport.
- PNR Calamba — Also known as PNR Clark Phase 3, PNR Calamba is the southern section of the NSCR. It involves the reconstruction of the existing Metro Commuter Line as an electrified standard gauge railway with elevated, at-grade, and depressed sections. The 56-kilometer (35-mile) railway will run from Solis station in Manila to Calamba station in Laguna.

PNR Clark 1 broke ground on February 15, 2019, followed by PNR Clark 2 on September 18, 2021. Meanwhile, construction of PNR Calamba began on July 3, 2023, following the closure of Alabang–Calamba commuter services the previous day. To fast-track the construction of NSCR South, the rest of the Metro Commuter Line services temporarily closed on March 27, 2024. The closure would fast-track construction by eight months, saving ₱15.18 billion in costs.

On March 15, 2024, the Department of Transportation announced the completion of the 14 kilometers (8.7 mi) segment of PNR Clark 1 from Malolos to Bocaue. Nevertheless, the remaining segments are 37.30-percent complete as of the month, while PNR Clark 2 is at 25.76 percent.

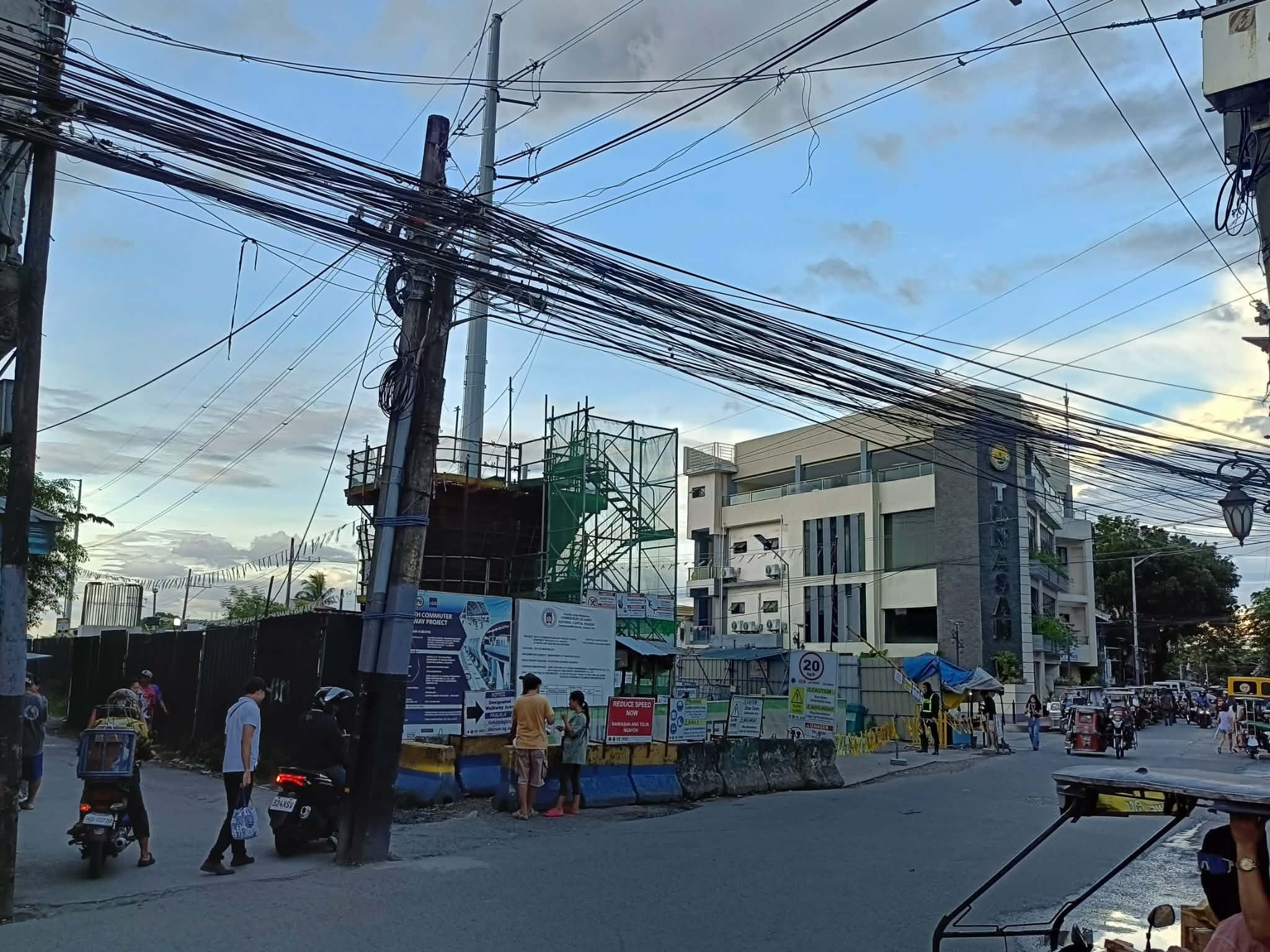
Construction of PNR Calamba in Tunasan, Muntinlupa in October 2025.

The partial opening was initially set for 2022, but this deadline was not met, presumably due to several factors including but not limited to right of way acquisition, and the COVID-19 pandemic. Instead, it expects partial operations by December 2027 and full operations by 3Q 2033. Additionally, according to a source, there are challenges regarding right of way, particularly in the Valenzuela to Sucat, Parañaque segment. The government has extended financial help to formal and informal settlers affected by the construction. However, sources said that this project could not be finished during the Marcos administration.

The first section of PNR Clark 1, spanning from Solis to Valenzuela, was delayed due to right of way issues. The right of way is obstructed by 1,100 square metres (0.00042 sq mi) of private properties, utilities, ROW sharing between the DOTr and the NLEX Harbor Link Segment 10, and affected PNR Facilities, among others. The DOTr is currently unable to turn over the Caloocan depot. In March 2025, PNR General Manager Deovanni Miranda stated that the segment between Tutuban and Caloocan, where informal settlers will be displaced, is under discussion with the local government. Additionally, he mentioned that the PNR area has also been 80% cleared, with the contractor expected to achieve 100% clearance. As of 2026, there are no updates for this section.

Despite concerns over the planned segment, numerous commuters can use jeepneys and buses to travel from West Valenzuela to the MRT or South Commuter Railway. The planned Caloocan station is now occupied by the Caloocan Lifestyle Park as suggested by the city government.

As of January 9, 2026, the right-of-way for the NSCR is now 56% acquired, while the Metro Manila Subway right-of-way is now 90.76% acquired.

== Route ==
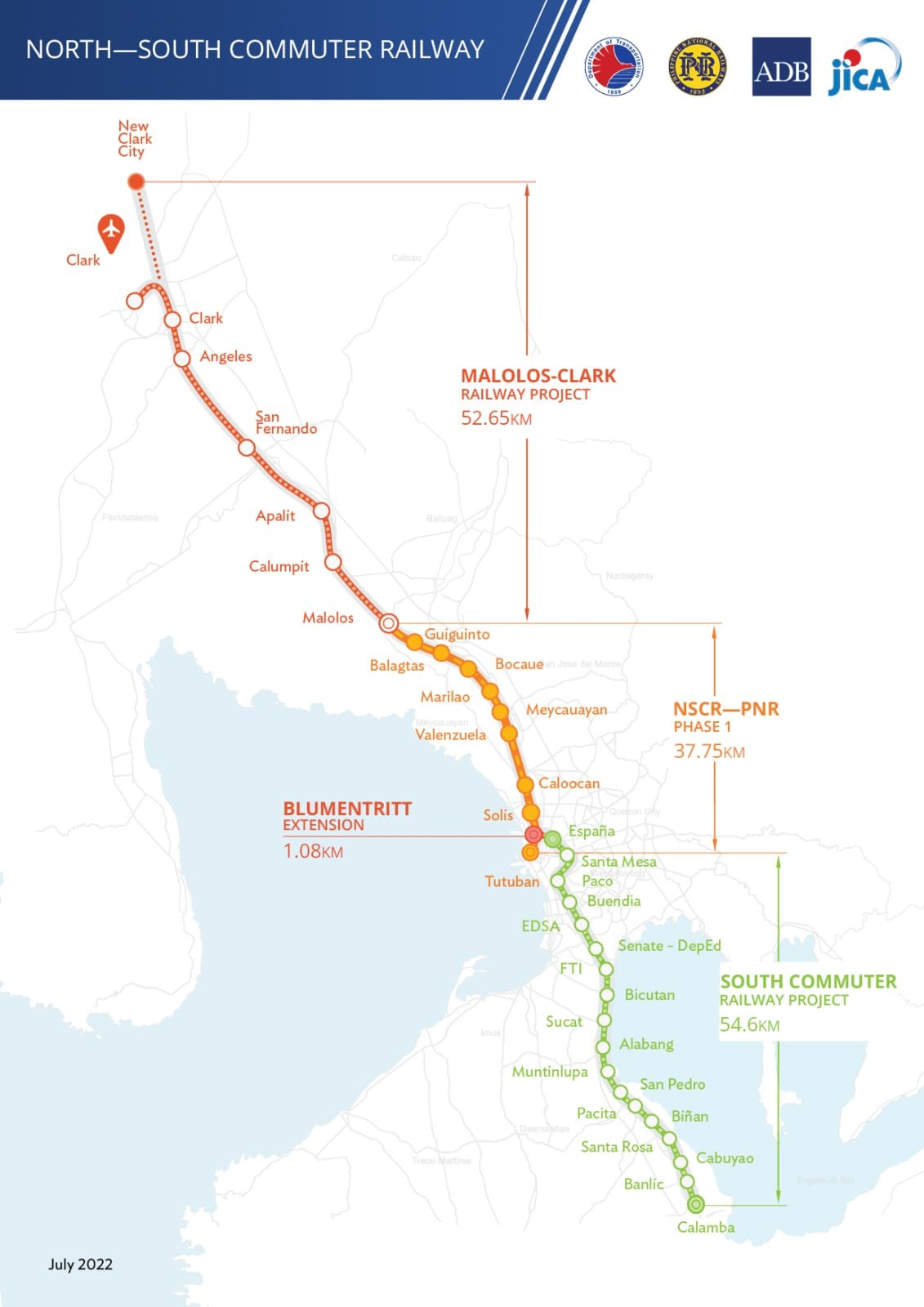
Transit map of the NSCR by the Department of Transportation

The North–South Commuter Railway will comprise two sections corresponding to the Philippine National Railways' old main lines. The first is the 91-kilometer (57-mile) fully-elevated PNR Clark which is being built over the mostly-defunct North Main Line in northern Metro Manila and Central Luzon. The second is the 56-kilometer (35-mile) PNR Calamba which will use the existing PNR Metro Commuter Line right of way between Tutuban and Calamba, which were historically parts of the South Main Line and will have elevated, at-grade and depressed sections.

Timeline of the opening of sections
Date opening	Segment	New Stations
2028	Partial Operations 1	RL07 Malolos – RL13 Valenzuela
2029	Partial Operations 2 (Malolos–Clark Railway Project)	RN01 New Clark City, RL01 Clark International Airport – RL06 Calumpit
4Q 2031	South Commuter Railway Project	RL14 Caloocan – RL16 Solis, RL26 Alabang – RL34 Calamba
3Q 2033	Full operations	RT01 Tutuban, RL17 España– RL25 Sucat

=== Services ===
There are four classes of services on this line. The following are:

- Commuter is the basic commuter rail service and has the least priority. It stops at all stations within its route. There are three routes planned for this class; Tutuban–New Clark City, Tutuban–Calamba, and Clark International Airport–Calamba. The maximum speed for this service will be 120 kilometers per hour (75 miles per hour) for the entire line.
- Commuter Express is the limited-stop service for the line, succeeding the Commex service during the Metrotren era in the early 2000s. Although it will run faster than regular commuter trains, it will still use the same routes and rolling stock.
- The Airport Limited Express is the temporary designation for the planned airport rail link and limited express service between Clark International Airport and Alabang station. As the flagship NSCR service, it will use dedicated rolling stock complete with intercity-grade amenities plus baggage space for people arriving from the airport. It will have a maximum speed of 160 kilometers per hour (100 miles per hour) along the NSCR North. As of January 2022, the final name for the service is yet to be determined.
- Subway through-service is the proposed augmentation between the NSCR and the Metro Manila Subway. It will serve the southernmost areas of Metro Manila and neighboring Laguna, branching from the subway line at FTI station while the remainder of the line will go towards the direction of NAIA Terminal 3 in Pasay. It will use the Subway trainsets instead of the NSCR ones, although both are from the sustina family.

=== Stations ===
Legend

●	Stops at all times during operating hours
｜	Trains do not stop here
—	Trains do not pass here
†	Future terminus

Proposed train stations and services
Phase	Station		Services								Transfers	Location	
Phase	Station		Commuter			Commuter Express			Limited Express	Through service to/from Metro Manila Subway	Transfers	Location	
Phase	Station		NCC–Tutuban	CIA–Calamba	Tutuban–Calamba	NCC–Tutuban	CIA–Calamba	Tutuban–Calamba	CIA-Alabang	Through service to/from Metro Manila Subway	Transfers	City / Municipality	Province
PNR Clark 2	RN01	New Clark City †	●	—	—	●	—	—	—	—	Clark Loop New Clark City (NGAC)	Capas	Tarlac
PNR Clark 2	RL01 AE01	Clark International Airport †	｜	●	—	｜	●	—	●	—	Clark International Airport	Mabalacat	Pampanga
PNR Clark 2	RL02	Clark	●	●	—	●	●	—	｜	—	none	Mabalacat	Pampanga
PNR Clark 2	RL03	Angeles	●	●	—	｜	｜	—	｜	—	none	Angeles City	Pampanga
PNR Clark 2	RL04	San Fernando	●	●	—	●	●	—	｜	—	none	San Fernando	Pampanga
PNR Clark 2	RL05	Apalit	●	●	—	｜	｜	—	｜	—	none	Apalit	Pampanga
PNR Clark 2	RL06	Calumpit	●	●	—	｜	｜	—	｜	—	none	Calumpit	Bulacan
PNR Clark 2	RL07	Malolos	●	●	—	●	●	—	｜	—	P2P Robinson's Malolos	Malolos	Bulacan
PNR Clark 1		Malolos	●	●	—	●	●	—	｜	—		Malolos	Bulacan
PNR Clark 1	RL07a	Malolos South	●	●	—	｜	｜	—	｜	—	none	Malolos	Bulacan
PNR Clark 1	RL08	Guiguinto	●	●	—	｜	｜	—	｜	—	Jeepneys and Tricycles	Guiguinto	Bulacan
PNR Clark 1	RL08a	Tuktukan	●	●	—	｜	｜	—	｜	—	Tricycles	Guiguinto	Bulacan
PNR Clark 1	RL09	Balagtas	●	●	—	｜	｜	—	｜	—	14 35 UltraMega Balagtas	Balagtas	Bulacan
PNR Clark 1	RL10	Bocaue	●	●	—	●	●	—	｜	—	14 35 Wakas (Joner's Supermart)	Bocaue	Bulacan
PNR Clark 1	RL10a	Tabing Ilog	●	●	—	｜	｜	—	｜	—	none	Marilao	Bulacan
PNR Clark 1	RL11	Marilao	●	●	—	●	●	—	｜	—	14 35 SM Marilao	Marilao	Bulacan
PNR Clark 1	RL12	Meycauayan	●	●	—	｜	｜	—	｜	—	14 35 Malhacan Road	Meycauayan	Bulacan
PNR Clark 1	RL13	Valenzuela	●	●	—	●	●	—	｜	—	14 35 42 Malanday	Valenzuela	Metro Manila (Note: Metro Manila is not a province, but a metropolitan area and region.)
PNR Clark 1	RL13a	Valenzuela Polo	●	●	—	｜	｜	—	｜	—	none	Valenzuela	Metro Manila
PNR Clark 1	RL13b	Malabon	●	●	—	｜	｜	—	｜	—	54 Letre	Malabon	Metro Manila
PNR Clark 1	RL14	Caloocan	●	●	—	●	●	—	｜	—	8 14 22 35 42 54 5th Avenue	Caloocan	Metro Manila
PNR Clark 1	RL15	Solis	●	●	—	｜	｜	—	｜	—	Abad Santos; 8 42 54 Abad Santos	Manila	Metro Manila
PNR Clark 1	RT01	Tutuban †	●	｜	●	●	｜	●	｜	—	Tutuban; 8 Divisoria	Manila	Metro Manila
PNR Calamba	RL16	Blumentritt	—	●	●	—	●	●	｜	—	Blumentritt; 42 Blumentritt	Manila	Metro Manila
PNR Calamba	RL17	España	—	●	●	—	●	●	｜	—	6 7 17 34 49 53; Blumentritt Road; 5 14 38 40 52 54 San Diego Street	Manila	Metro Manila
PNR Calamba	RL18	Santa Mesa	—	●	●	—	●	●	｜	—	Pureza; 2 3 Pureza; Pasig River Ferry Service PUP Ferry Station	Manila	Metro Manila
PNR Calamba	RL19	Paco	—	●	●	—	｜	｜	｜	—	54 Pandacan	Manila	Metro Manila
PNR Calamba	RL20 AE02	Buendia	—	●	●	—	●	●	●	—	4 Taft Avenue; 5 6 7 10 11 12 14 17 23 24 25 27 34 38 40 42 48 49 53 62 Buendia	Makati	Metro Manila
PNR Calamba	RL21	EDSA	—	●	●	—	●	●	｜	—	Magallanes; 10 11 12 38 40 45 46 59 Magallanes	Makati	Metro Manila
PNR Calamba	RL22	Senate–DepEd	—	●	●	—	｜	｜	｜	—	MMS Senate–DepEd	Taguig	Metro Manila
PNR Calamba	RL23	FTI	—	●	●	—	●	●	●	—	MMS FTI; 41 45 62 TCITX	Taguig	Metro Manila
PNR Calamba	RL24	Bicutan	—	●	●	—	｜	｜	｜	●	MMS Bicutan; 10 15A 24 36 40 50 Bicutan	Parañaque	Metro Manila
PNR Calamba	RL25	Sucat	—	●	●	—	●	●	●	●	PNR South Long Haul; 10 15A 24 36 40 44 50 Sucat	Muntinlupa	Metro Manila
PNR Calamba	RL26 AE03	Alabang †	—	●	●	—	●	●	●	●	10 15A 23 24 36 40 44 50 Vista Terminal Exchange	Muntinlupa	Metro Manila
PNR Calamba	RL27	Muntinlupa	—	●	●	—	●	●	—	●	15B 38 39 46 48 Tunasan	Muntinlupa	Metro Manila
PNR Calamba	RL28	San Pedro	—	●	●	—	｜	｜	—	●	15B 38 39 46 48 United Bayanihan	San Pedro	Laguna
PNR Calamba	RL29	Pacita	—	●	●	—	｜	｜	—	●	15B 38 39 46 48 Pacita Terminal	San Pedro	Laguna
PNR Calamba	RL30	Biñan	—	●	●	—	｜	｜	—	●	12 25 Biñan Bayan; 58 59 Southwoods	Biñan	Laguna
PNR Calamba	RL31	Santa Rosa	—	●	●	—	●	●	—	●	11 15C 30 Balibago (Santa Rosa Commercial Complex)	Santa Rosa	Laguna
PNR Calamba	RL32	Cabuyao	—	●	●	—	●	●	—	●	Jeepneys and Tricycles	Cabuyao	Laguna
PNR Calamba	RL33	Banlic	—	●	●	—	｜	｜	—	●	PNR South Long Haul	Calamba	Laguna
PNR Calamba	RL34	Calamba †	—	●	●	—	●	●	—	●	none	Calamba	Laguna
Stations in italics will open in 2030.

=== Extensions and additional stations ===
The Metro Manila Dream Plan proposed a 38-kilometer (24-mile) branch line that will split in Angeles City. The line will have 12 stations and shall end in Tarlac City. The study also proposed a 47-kilometer (29-mile) extension of the NSCR to Batangas City. This will be built parallel to the PNR South Long Haul project which was approved in 2017, with the line being a single-track, standard gauge line without electrification, and will be built at-grade similar to the present PNR network. The PNR has also requested for a feasibility study for a commuter line connecting Tarlac City and San Jose, Nueva Ecija in 2019. The length of the line and the number of stations will be determined once a proposal has been submitted. Another proposed southward extension to Pansol in Calamba, Laguna was proposed by a 2019 JICA report.

The North–South Commuter Railway will also have provisions for infill stations: Malabon, Valenzuela Polo, Tabing Ilog, Tuktukan, and Malolos South.

=== Alternative options for the Valenzuela to Solis segment ===
According to Ted Failon on his radio program, he revealed that buses and jeepneys can connect West Valenzuela station with the MRT or South Commuter Railway, which is part of the project.

== Infrastructure ==
NSCR will be the first commuter rail system in the country to be mostly grade-separated. Trains are designed to run on 1,435 mm (4 ft 8 1/2 in) standard gauge tracks at a design speed of 120 kilometers per hour (75 miles per hour) for regular trains and 160 kilometers per hour (99 miles per hour) for airport express trains.

=== Station layout ===
All stations will have a standard layout, with a concourse level and a platform level. The stations are designed to adhere to both Philippine and Japanese standards. Stations will either have island platforms or side platforms with platform screen doors. The stations are designed to be barrier-free, and trains shall have spaces for passengers using wheelchairs. Historical stations will be preserved. All stations will have access to intermodal facilities. The FTI station in particular will be connected to the Taguig City Integrated Terminal Exchange.

=== Rolling stock ===
The North–South Commuter Railway will have two types of rolling stock: commuter trains and airport express trains. Except for wheelchair spaces, the commuter trains will have a capacity of 2,242 passengers. The express trains, on the other hand, will have a capacity of 392 passengers. A total of 464 electric multiple unit traincars have been procured to operate on the line, with 408 of these being the 8-car EM1000 class trainsets to be built by the Japan Transport Engineering Company (J-TREC), successor to the Tokyu Car Corporation that provided rolling stock to the Philippines from 1955 to 1976. The trainsets, called the Sustina Commuter at the time of purchase, are based on JR East commuter stock such as the E233 series but adapted to standard gauge. The trains are also designed to be interoperable with the Metro Manila Subway. The trainsets have been designated as the EM1000 class in October 2021. Meanwhile, the second batch of train sets has been officially designated as the EM1100 class.

The procurement for the 56 airport express trainsets began on February 26, 2021, with a suggested preliminary design based on the E259 and E353 series being published on the same day. On May 10, the Department of Transportation later announced that it would acquire the airport express trainsets from Japanese manufacturers. After several months of delays and rescheduling, three bidders have submitted their designs on October 15: Kawasaki Heavy Industries and Sojitz, Marubeni and Stadler Rail, and Mitsubishi and Construcciones y Auxiliar de Ferrocarriles (CAF). On August 24, 2023, Mitsubishi and CAF, also the manufacturers of the LRTA 13000 class trains on the LRT Line 1, were awarded the contract for the express trains.

Rolling stock	Commuter trains	Airport express trains
Image		
Year	Batch 1: Fiscal 2022; Batch 2: 2025–2028	TBD
Manufacturer	J-TREC	Mitsubishi and CAF
Model	EM1000 class (first batch); EM1100 class (second batch)	EM000000 class
Number to be built	408 cars (51 sets)	56 cars (7 sets)
Order no.	CP 03 (first batch); CP NS-02 (second batch)	CP NS-03
Formation	8 cars per trainset	
Car length	20 m (65 ft 7 in)	
Width	2.95 m (9 ft 8 in)	
Pantograph lockdown height	4.15 m (13 ft 7 in)	
Floor height	1.13–1.15 m (3 ft 8 in – 3 ft 9 in)	
Body material	Lightweight stainless steel	Aluminum alloy and stainless steel
Tare weight	270 t (600,000 lb)	315 t (694,000 lb)
Axle load	16 t (35,000 lb)	
Capacity	Leading car: 266 standing, 45 seated Intermediate car: 285 standing, 54 seated	Leading car: 40 seated Intermediate car: 52 seated PWD seating: 8 wheelchair spaces
Seat layout	Rapid transit-style longitudinal seating	Airline-style open coach seating
Doors per side	4	2
Traction control	IGBT–VVVF (first batch); Hybrid SiC–VVVF (second batch)	Hybrid SiC–VVVF
Traction power	1,500 V DC overhead catenary	
Pantograph type	1 single-arm pantograph	Toyo Denki 2 single-arm pantographs, outward facing
Top speed	120 km/h (75 mph)	≥170 km/h (110 mph)
Train configuration	Tc–M–M–T–T–M–M–Tc	Tc–M–M–M–M–M–M–Tc
Other features	—N/a	Toilets, luggage racks
Status	First batch: Under construction/delivery	Ordered; to be built

=== Signaling ===
The North–South Commuter Railway will use the European Train Control System (ETCS) Level 2 for signaling, making it the first main line in Southeast Asia with ETCS Level 2. Initially, the PNR Clark 1 section of the line was set to use a communications-based train control (CBTC) system. The subsystems consist of automatic train control (ATC), automatic train protection (ATP), automatic train supervision (ATS), train detection through track circuits, and computer-based interlocking, with provisions for automatic train operation (ATO).

Hitachi Rail STS, Hitachi's Italian subsidiary, was tapped in November 2022 to provide the signaling equipment for PNR Clark 1 as part of a contract package covering electrical and mechanical systems, and track works. Meanwhile, Alstom was tapped in March of the same year to supply its Atlas 200 solution for PNR Clark 2 and PNR Calamba.

=== Tracks ===
The line will feature an Elastic Sleeper Direct Fasten (ESDF) type ballastless track with concrete sleepers in the mainline and plastic/fiber-reinforced foam urethane railroad ties on turnouts in the mainline and depot. Continuous welded rails will be employed on the mainline, while jointed rails with fishplates will be employed in the depot. 60-kilogram-per-meter (120-pound-per-yard) rails will be employed in the mainline while rails built to the JIS 50N rail profile will be used in the depot.

=== Depot ===
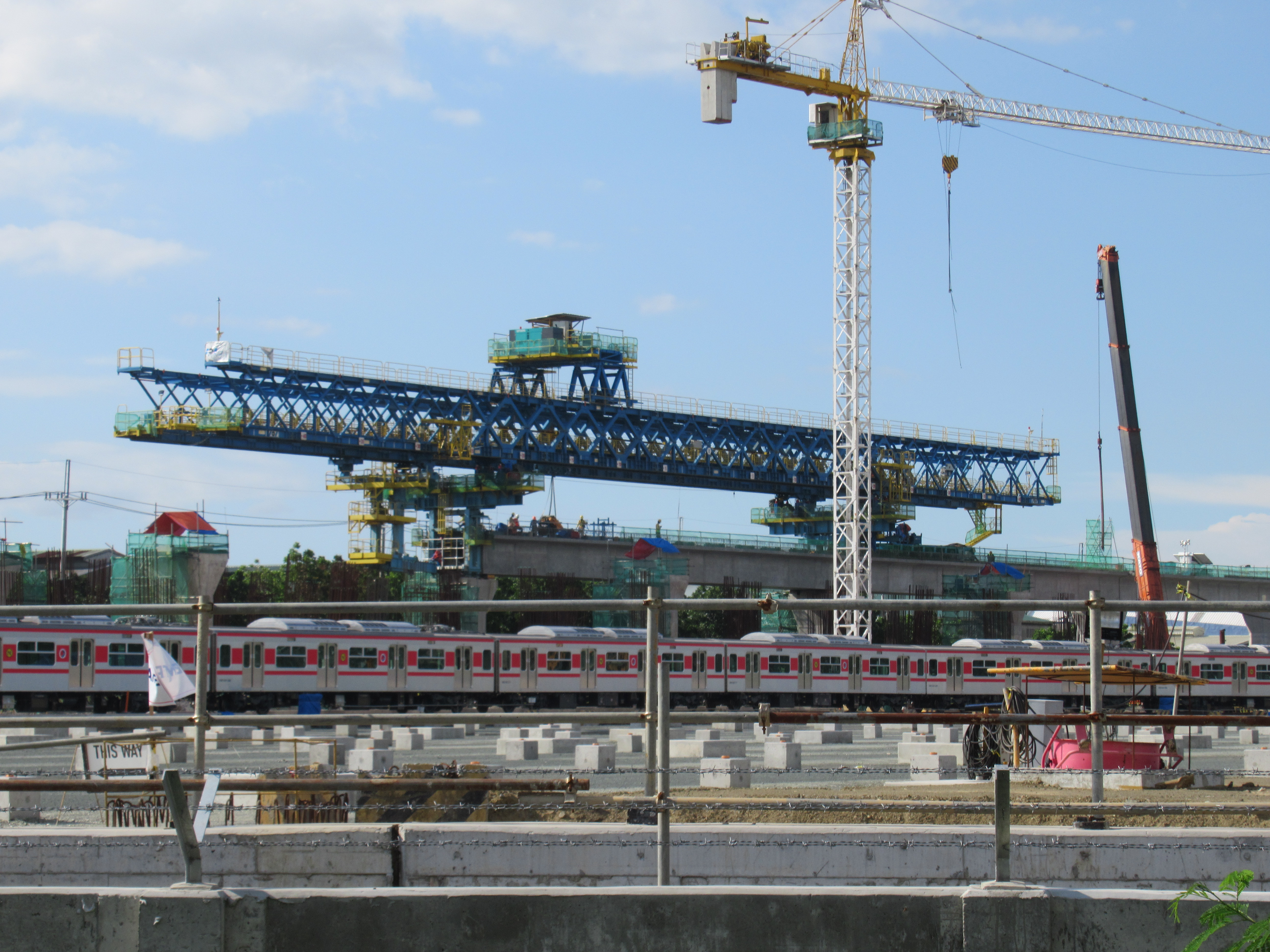
Valenzuela station and Malanday depot under construction in 2022

The railway will have three depots with one in each region: Malanday, Mabalacat, and Banlic. The Malanday depot, located beside the Valenzuela station in Malanday, Valenzuela, will serve as the main depot, hosting the operations control center for the entire line. The Mabalacat depot, located along Gil Puyat Avenue in Clark Freeport Zone, Mabalacat, Pampanga, will function as a parking facility for train sets plying the Malolos–Calamba route. The Banlic depot will be located on a 24.5-hectare (61-acre) lot in Calamba, Laguna, near the namesake barangay and station in Cabuyao, featuring a control center, stabling yard, maintenance shop, and ancillary buildings.

== See also ==
- Philippine National Railways
- Department of Transportation (DOTr)
- Transportation in the Philippines
- Rail transportation in the Greater Manila Area
