= Clark International Airport station =

Future station of the North South Commuter Railway

Clark International Airport

General information
- Location: Clark Freeport; Mabalacat, Pampanga; Philippines
- Coordinates: 15°11′56″N 120°33′24″E
- Owner: Philippine National Railways
- Operator: Philippine National Railways
- Line: North Commuter
- Platforms: Two island platforms
- Tracks: 4
- Connections: P2P buses Clark International Airport

Construction
- Structure type: Underground
- Parking: Yes
- Cycle facilities: No
- Accessible: Yes

Other information
- Status: Under construction

History
- Opening: 2028

Services
Preceding station	PNR	Following station
Terminus	Airport Limited Express	Buendia towards Alabang
Terminus	NSCR Commuter CIA–Calamba	Clark towards Calamba
Terminus	Commuter Express CIA–Calamba	Clark towards Calamba
Location

Clark International Airport station is an under-construction underground North–South Commuter Railway (NSCR) airport rail link station located in Mabalacat, Pampanga, Philippines. The station will host the first direct airport rail link in the country, being connected to its namesake, Clark International Airport.

== Station layout ==
The station is located underground. It will have two island platforms and quadruple tracks, stemming at a section of the line underneath a roundabout for roads at ground-level. Allowances for a future transport hub have already been allotted and a parking lot is located atop the station.

== History ==
A rail link from Clark International Airport to the capital was originally planned in the 1990s. The first proposal, called the "Manila–Clark rapid railway system", was discontinued due to disagreement on funding. In the early 2000s, the Northrail project was pursued. This involved the conversion the rail gauge from narrow gauge to standard gauge, and linking Manila to Malolos, Bulacan and eventually to Clark and the airport. While the project commenced in 2007, it was repeatedly halted due to allegations of overpricing, then discontinued in 2011. The station is being constructed as part of the second phase of the North–South Commuter Railway.

== Design ==
The station will be built at the end of the Clark spur line of the NSCR, while the mainline will lead to the future New Clark City station in Capas, Tarlac. Without a railway wye to link the station with New Clark City, there are no direct segments linking the two sections.

It will begin as an approximately 1,000 m (3,300 ft) quadruple-track segment of the mainline before splitting near the SCTEX–NLEX Interchange Road. From there, it will continue as an elevated line for at least 1,000 m (3,300 ft) before approaching an at-grade section in which the two depot tracks for the Mabalacat rail yard will meet the branch line. The Clark Airport-bound section will transition from at-grade to depressed before approaching a Y-junction with one of the depot tracks. At this point, the rest of the line will be underground until it reaches the station. According to detailed design documents, the maximum speed for this section is at 120 kilometers per hour (75 mph) due to a tighter curve radius.
