= New Clark City station =

Proposed train station in Capas, Philippines

New Clark City

General information
- Location: New Clark City; Capas, Tarlac; Philippines
- Owner: Philippine National Railways
- Operator: Philippine National Railways
- Line: North Commuter
- Tracks: 2

Construction
- Parking: No
- Cycle facilities: No
- Accessible: Yes

Other information
- Status: Proposed

Services
Preceding station	PNR	Following station
Terminus	NSCR Commuter NCC–Tutuban	Clark towards Tutuban
Terminus	Commuter Express NCC–Tutuban	Clark towards Tutuban

New Clark City station is a proposed railway station located on the North–South Commuter Railway in New Clark City, Capas, Tarlac, Philippines. The proposed station is under the 18.1-kilometer-long (11.2 mi) extension.

== History ==
A rail link from Clark International Airport to the capital was originally planned in the 1990s. The first proposal, called the "Manila–Clark rapid railway system", was discontinued due to disagreement on funding. In the early 2000s, the NorthRail project was pursued. This involved the conversion of the rail gauge from narrow gauge to standard gauge, and linking Manila to Malolos, Bulacan and eventually to Clark and the airport. While the project commenced in 2007, it was repeatedly halted due to allegations of overpricing, then discontinued in 2011. The project was revived as the North–South Commuter Railway, and it's extension to the planned city was announced in 2024.

In 2026, 30 companies participated in market engaging conference that covers the detailed engineering design and international checking engineer for the extension.

== Design ==
The station will be constructed as part of the second phase of the North–South Commuter Railway. Without a railway wye to link the station with Clark International Airport, there are no direct segments linking the two stations.
