= Solis station =

Railway station in Manila, Philippines

Solis
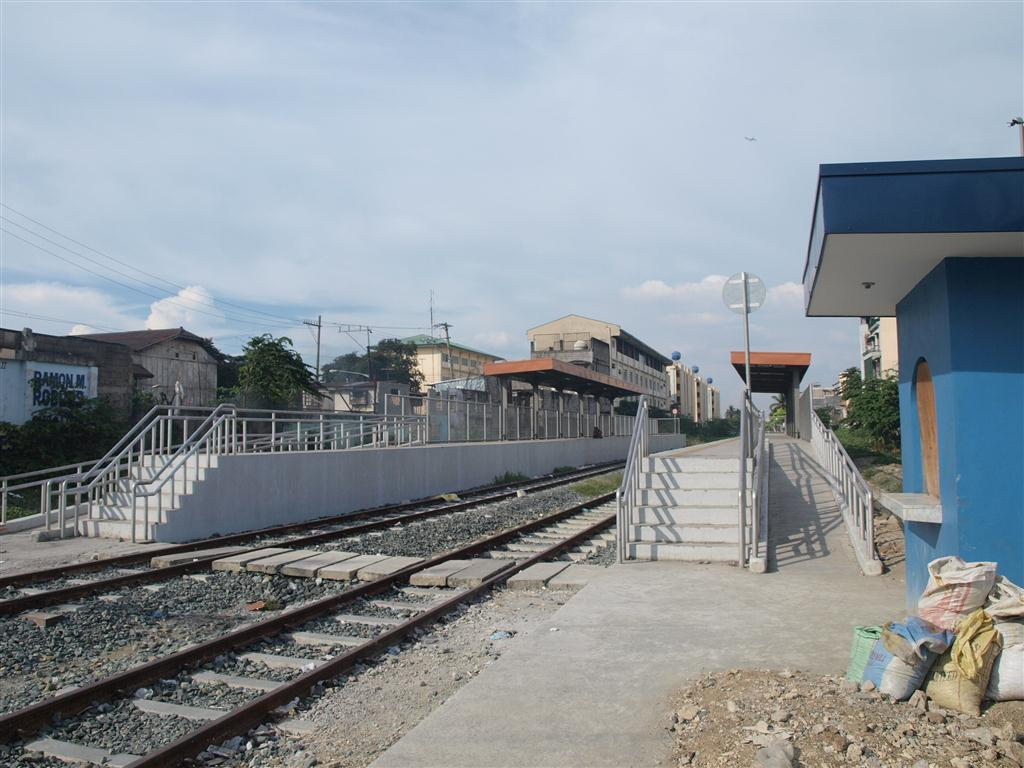
- Exterior of Solis station

General information
- Location: Solis Street, Tondo; Manila, Metro Manila; Philippines
- Coordinates: 14°37′37.74″N 120°58′32.10″E
- Owner: Philippine National Railways
- Operator: Philippine National Railways
- Lines: North Main Line; Planned: North Commuter
- Platforms: Side platforms
- Tracks: 2

Construction
- Structure type: At grade
- Accessible: Yes

Other information
- Status: Closed
- Station code: SLS

History
- Opened: August 1, 2018
- Closed: March 28, 2024

Services
Preceding station	PNR	Following station
5th Avenue station towards Governor Pascual	North Shuttle	Blumentritt towards Bicutan
5th Avenue station towards Governor Pascual	Metro North Commuter	Tutuban Terminus
Future services
Preceding station	PNR	Following station
Caloocan towards Clark International Airport	NSCR Commuter CIA–Calamba	Blumentritt towards Calamba
Caloocan towards New Clark City	NSCR Commuter NCC–Tutuban	Tutuban Terminus
Location
- Location within Manila Location within Metro Manila Location within Luzon Location within Philippines

Solis station is a railway station located on the North Main Line in the city of Manila, Philippines.

After being abandoned for 20 years, and after nearly 10 years since the station's reconstruction, PNR reopened the Solis Station as part of Caloocan-Dela Rosa line, on August 1, 2018.

Due to nearly a decade of disuse since its rehabilitation, the station has been weathered and its gate barriers have been vandalized, and in the case of its westbound barrier, dismantled and possibly stolen. It did not have running electricity until after its reactivation.

This station was closed to rail traffic on 1997. On 2009, the station's new platforms were constructed but it was never opened until 2018 where it is once again active with the launching of the Caloocan-Dela Rosa shuttle line.

Due to the closure of the PNR Metro Commuter Line, the reopened station is closed once again. It is currently being repurposed as an elevated station of the under construction North-South Commuter Railway, following the PNR line's closure on March 28, 2024. As of 2026, the reconstruction of that station has been delayed due to right of way issues.

== Overview ==
Solis, C-3 and Asistio Avenue stations originally lies on the old Manila-Dagupan Line, later the Manila-San Fernando Line, also known as the Main Line North.

Rail skates and rickshaws run along the line, providing an alternate source of transportation, though before the construction of NLEX Segment 10.1. This was the only line to travel to the Caloocan railway depot.

== Station layout ==
L1; Platforms	Side platform, doors will open on the left
L1; Platforms	Platform A	PNR Metro Commuter towards FTI and Tutuban (←)
L1; Platforms	Platform B	PNR Metro Commuter towards Governor Pascual (→)
L1	Concourse/ Street Level	Ticket Booths, Station Control, Shops
