= 5th Avenue station (PNR) =

Railway station in the Philippines

5th Avenue
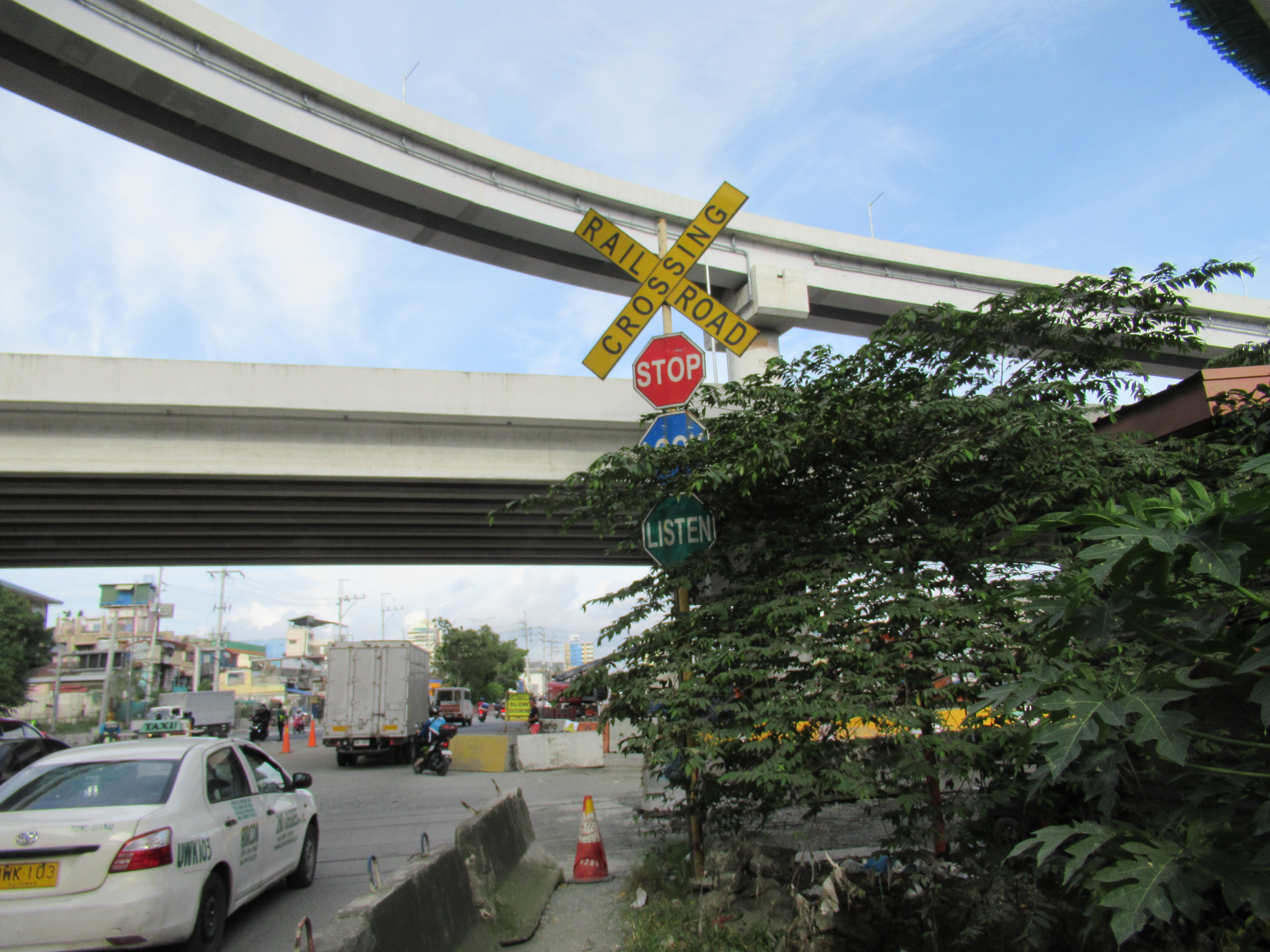
- 5th Avenue station have no existing permanent infrastructure.

General information
- Other names: C-3
- Location: 5th Avenue (C-3), Caloocan
- Coordinates: 14°38′40″N 120°58′34″E
- Owner: Philippine National Railways
- Operator: Philippine National Railways
- Lines: North Main Line; Planned: North Commuter
- Platforms: Stair
- Tracks: 1

Construction
- Structure type: At grade
- Accessible: Yes

Other information
- Status: Closed
- Station code: 5TH

History
- Opened: August 1, 2018

Services
Preceding station	PNR	Following station
10th Avenue station towards Governor Pascual	North Shuttle	Solis towards Bicutan
10th Avenue station towards Governor Pascual	Metro North Commuter	Solis towards Tutuban
Location
- Location within Metro Manila Location within Luzon Location within Philippines

5th Avenue station (also called C-3 station) is a railway station located on the North Main Line in Caloocan, Metro Manila, Philippines. Facilities such as ramps and platforms were planned to be constructed near the level crossing with C-3 Road. The plans to rehabilitate this part of PNR's network were implemented. Still, no concrete platforms were erected, later repurposed to become a station of the under-construction North–South Commuter Railway.

PNR opened the 5th Avenue station as part of Caloocan-Dela Rosa line on August 1, 2018. It is a brand new stop for the line as it was not a designated station before in the line's history. As there are no platforms yet being erected, temporary stairs for the trains are added in the meantime to facilitate loading and unloading.

The new elevated expressway for NLEX Harbor Link is located immediately beside the railway station, with neighboring houses demolished for the construction, reducing the rail tracks to 1. An extension of the NLEX Connector was completed and opened in 2023. A year later, the NSCR construction project began, leading to the station’s closure. Work on the NSCR’s version of the station has yet to start due to ongoing right of way issues.

== Station layout ==
L1; Platforms	Side platform, doors will open on the right
L1; Platforms	Platform	PNR Metro Commuter towards FTI and Tutuban (←)
L1; Platforms	Platform	PNR Metro Commuter towards Governor Pascual (→)
L1	Concourse/ Street Level	Ticket Booths, Station Control, Shops, A. Mabini Street Furniture Shops

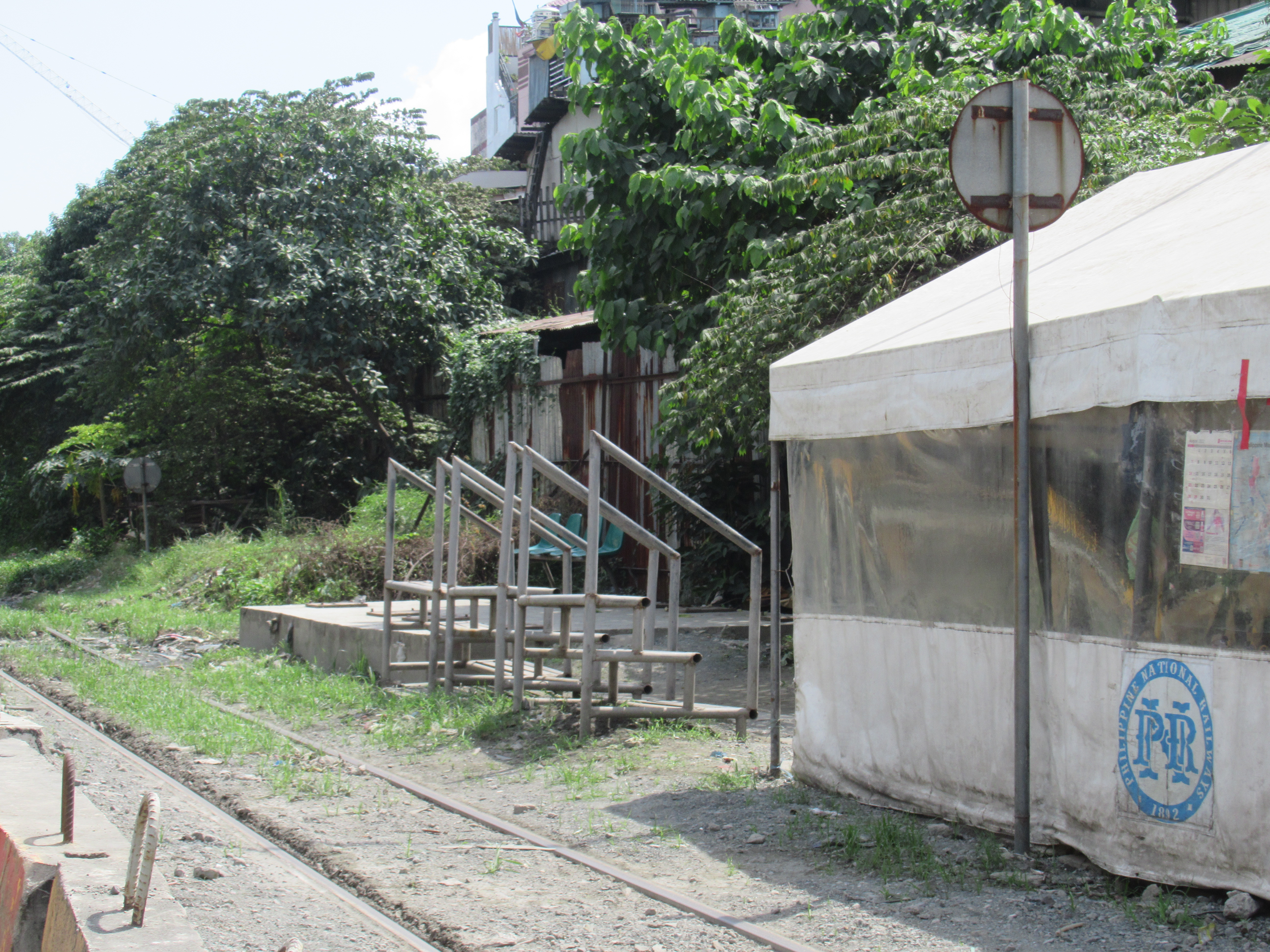
5th Avenue station in October 2022

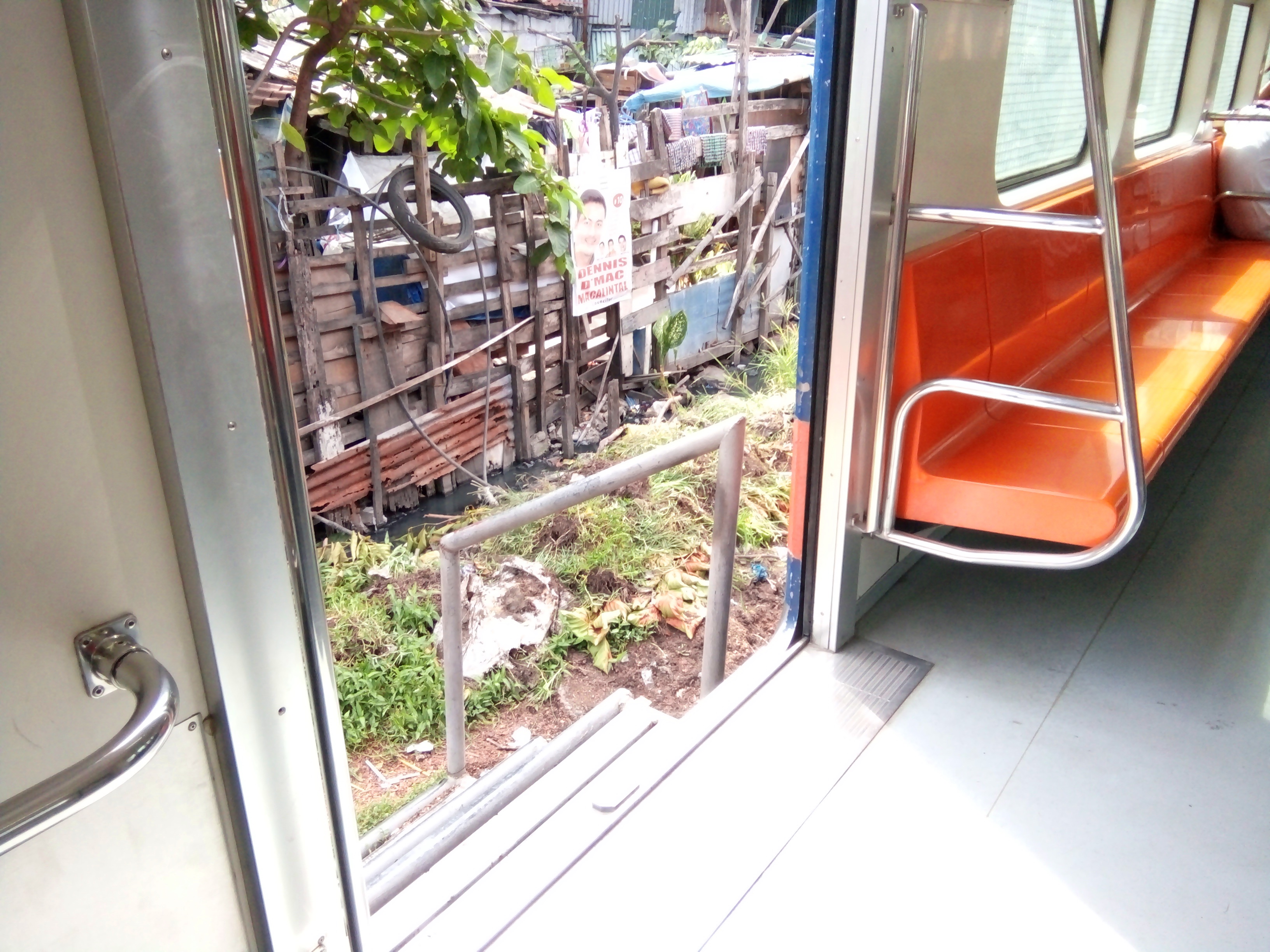
C-3 station steel stair
