= Caloocan station =

Railway station in Metro Manila, Philippines

Caloocan
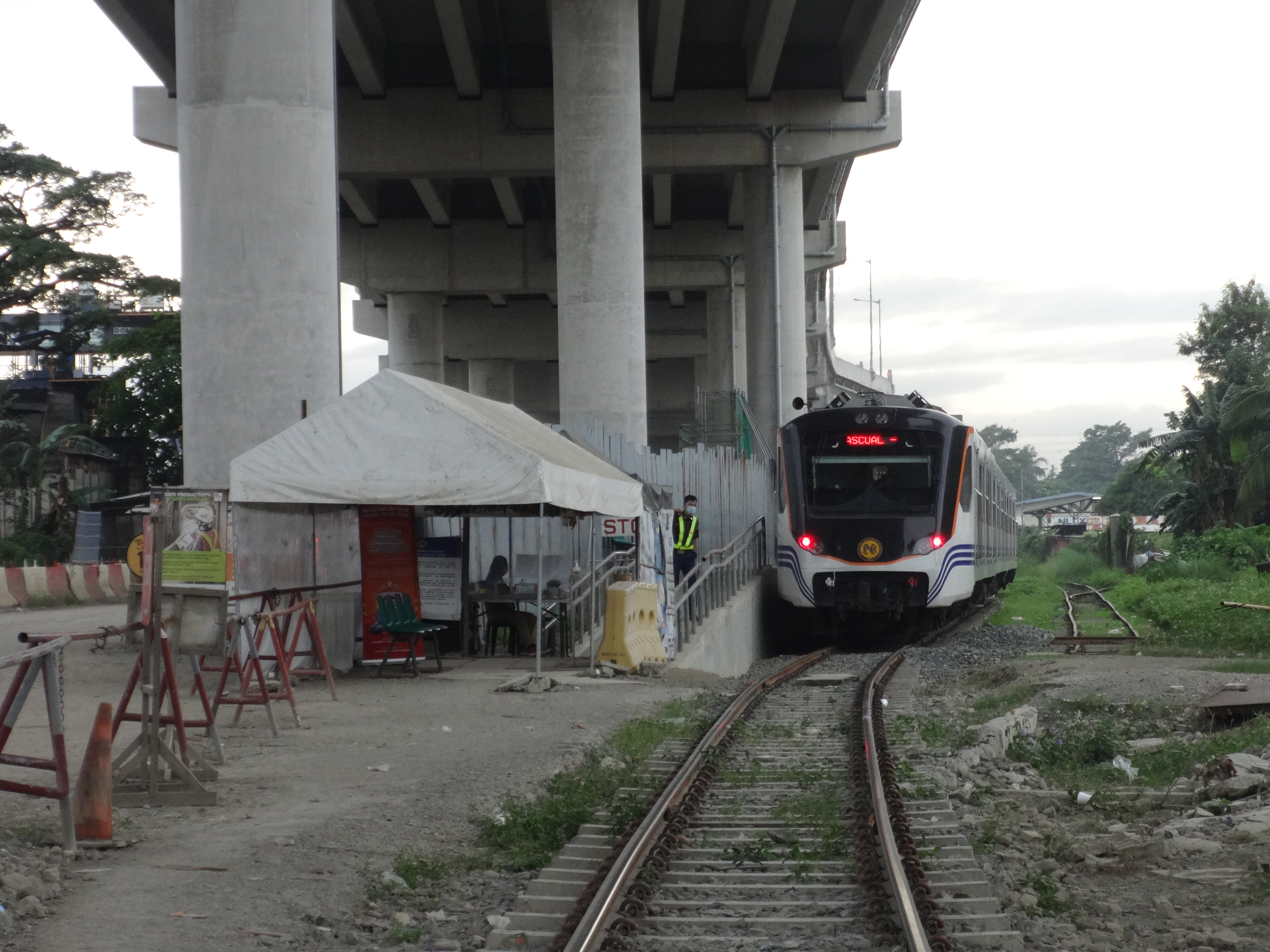
- Caloocan railway station in 2020

General information
- Other names: Sangandaan, Samson Road
- Location: Samson Road, Sangandaan; Caloocan, Metro Manila; Philippines
- Coordinates: 14°39′25″N 120°58′25″E
- Owner: Philippine National Railways
- Operator: Philippine National Railways
- Lines: North Main Line; Planned: North Commuter
- Platforms: Side platform
- Tracks: 1, 1 side, 1 spur to the Caloocan Depot

Other information
- Status: Closed
- Station code: CN/SGDN

History
- Opened: March 24, 1891 (original); September 10, 2018 (current)
- Closed: March 28, 2024 (current)
- Rebuilt: 2009 (partly)

Services
Preceding station	PNR	Following station
Governor Pascual Terminus	North Shuttle	10th Avenue station towards Bicutan
Governor Pascual Terminus	Metro North Commuter	10th Avenue station towards Tutuban
Future services
Preceding station	PNR	Following station
Malabon towards Clark International Airport	NSCR Commuter CIA–Calamba	Solis towards Calamba
Malabon towards New Clark City	NSCR Commuter NCC–Tutuban	Solis towards Tutuban
Valenzuela towards Clark International Airport	Commuter Express CIA–Calamba	Blumentritt towards Calamba
Valenzuela towards New Clark City	Commuter Express NCC–Tutuban	Tutuban Terminus
Location
- Location within Metro Manila Location within Luzon Location within Philippines

Caloocan station (also called Sangandaan station) is a railway station located on the North Main Line in Caloocan, Metro Manila, Philippines. It is rebuilt from its original location, now situated adjacent to the Caloocan railway depot, near Samson Road.

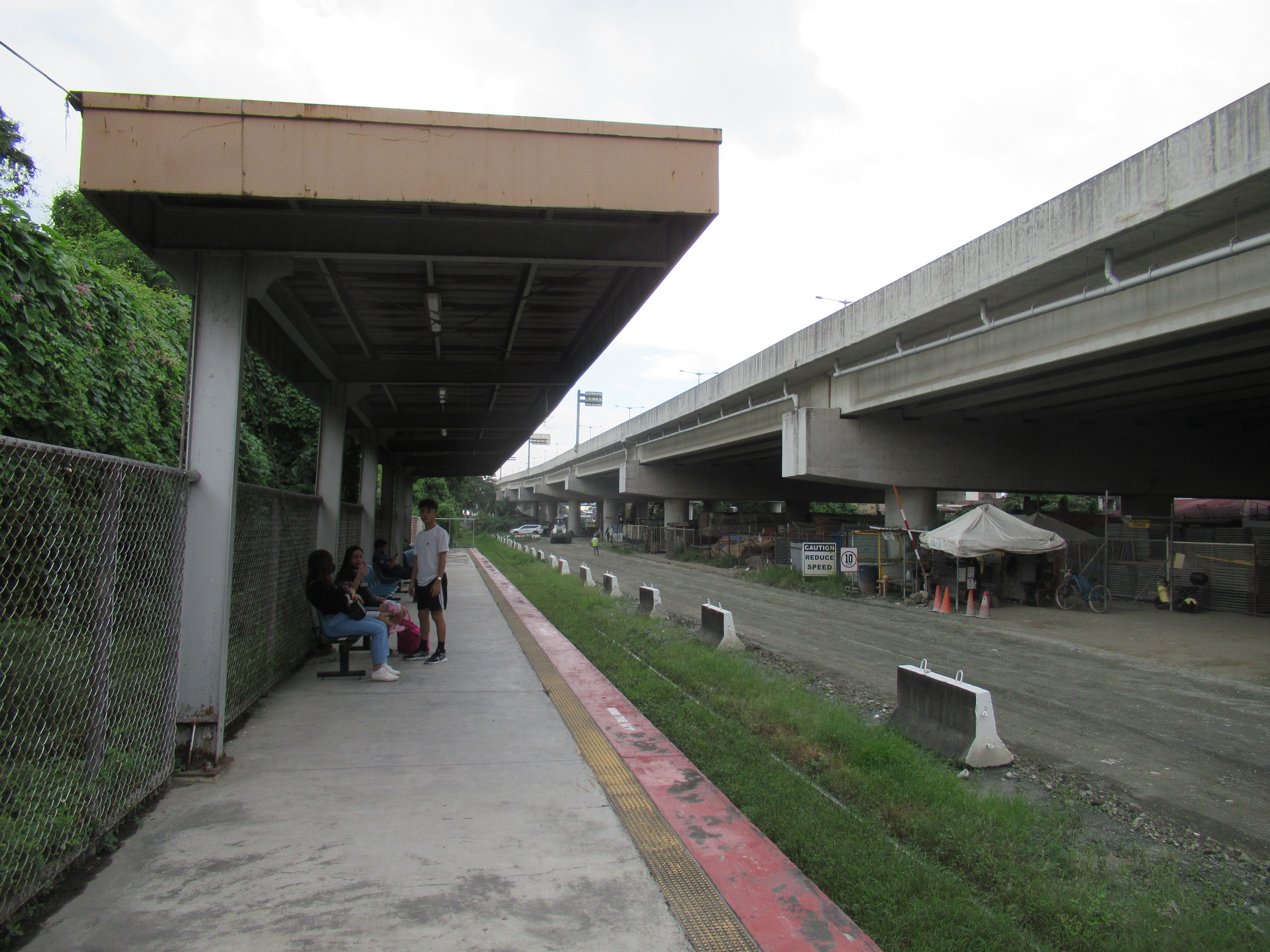
Caloocan station (Sangandaan) in November 2022

== History ==
The station was originally part of the railway line operated by Manila Railroad Company connecting Manila to northern Luzon that commenced operations on March 24, 1891. It was the first railroad station serving Caloocan, which was then a town of Manila province at the time of its opening. It originally had two station buildings located 568.15 meters (1,864.0 ft) apart: a two-story building at the Caloocan Depot and another across what is now Samson Road. It was described a key entry point of the railway line to the north and central Luzon. On August 31, 1898, the general order in response to Manila Railroad Company general manager Thomas Higgins's request to continue operations despite the Spanish–American War, General Emilio Aguinaldo ordered his troops to guard the Caloocan station facility and inspect its coaches and trainsets located inside the station.

The station was abandoned in 1997 after services to Meycauayan ceased, but was supposed to be replaced by a new one in as a result of the rehabilitation of PNR Southrail and the Northrail project, a rebuilding of the line from Manila to Pampanga which would partly use the old right-of-way. The project commenced in 2007, construction has halted though as of 2011 and underwent many renegotiation, including a litigation as a result of the cancellation with the Chinese contractor. On 2017, Caloocan and 16 other stations situated on the abandoned line would be rebuilt as part of the newly revitalized elevated Northrail system serving from Tutuban in Manila to Clark in Pampanga, reviving its use once again as a railway station.

In conjunction, PNR reopened the Caloocan segment as part of the new at-grade Caloocan-Dela Rosa line, on August 1, 2018. However, boarding and alighting from this station was not yet possible then, as the location is very near the staging facilities for the construction of NLEX Segment 10.1, a part of NLEX Harbor Link. It had to be cleared and reconditioned for reactivation by the PNR, which took more than a month. Upon upgrading the line to stop at FTI instead of Dela Rosa station, PNR reopened the station to passengers on September 10, after many years of closure.

The rails beyond this station to the north was dismantled and replaced with standard gauge tracks for the ill-fated NorthRail project. The same standard gauge tracks were also dismantled during the construction of the overhead viaduct for the NLEX Segment 10.1. In 2017, the NorthRail right of way was modified, reinstating the at-grade tracks in tandem with an elevated railway leading to Clark. PNR has since been steadily reinstating the at-grade rails and service with the old Acacia railway station (renamed as Governor Pascual railway station) at Governor Pascual Avenue in Malabon being rebuilt, along with its railtracks.

The level crossing on Samson Road was restored on November 23, 2018, which enables the PNR to serve Malabon once again. Services to Governor Pascual resumed on December 3, 2018, after two decades of hiatus.

The original Caloocan Railway Station, located facing what is now the Caloocan depot and considered historical, was partially demolished in 2019 for the North Luzon Expressway Harbor Link or Segment 10, and its rail tracks severed from the main line for some time. The partial demolition garnered complaints from historians and train enthusiasts. The original station sits beside the current girder storage facility for Leighton Builders, the contractors of the NLEX Segment 10, between the present locations of 10th Avenue railway station and the new station along Samson Road.

On March 28, 2024, The current Caloocan Railway Station is temporary suspended within 5 years make way from construction of the North–South Commuter Railway. However, this was delayed due to right of way issues. Instead, the Caloocan city government proposed a lifestyle park which is occupying the old Caloocan depot and beneath the NLEX Harbor Link.

== Nearby landmarks ==
The station is near major landmarks such as SM Center Sangandaan, South Caloocan City Police Station Headquarters, Caloocan Post Office, Caloocan City Central Fire Station and schools such as University of the East Caloocan, STI College Caloocan, AMA Computer College-Caloocan and Andres Bonifacio Elementary School.

== Transportation links ==
The station is accessible by jeepneys plying the C4-Samson Road route starting from Malabon and Navotas through Bonifacio Monument and Manila Central University in Caloocan, as well as those plying the nearby A. Mabini and M.H. Del Pilar Streets.

== Station layout ==
L1; Platforms	Side platform, doors will open on the left
L1; Platforms	Platform	PNR Metro Commuter towards FTI and Tutuban (←)
L1; Platforms	Platform	PNR Metro Commuter towards Governor Pascual (→)
L1	Concourse/ Street Level	Ticket Booths, Station Control, Shops, Samson Road
