= 10th Avenue station (PNR) =

Railway station in the Philippines

10th Avenue
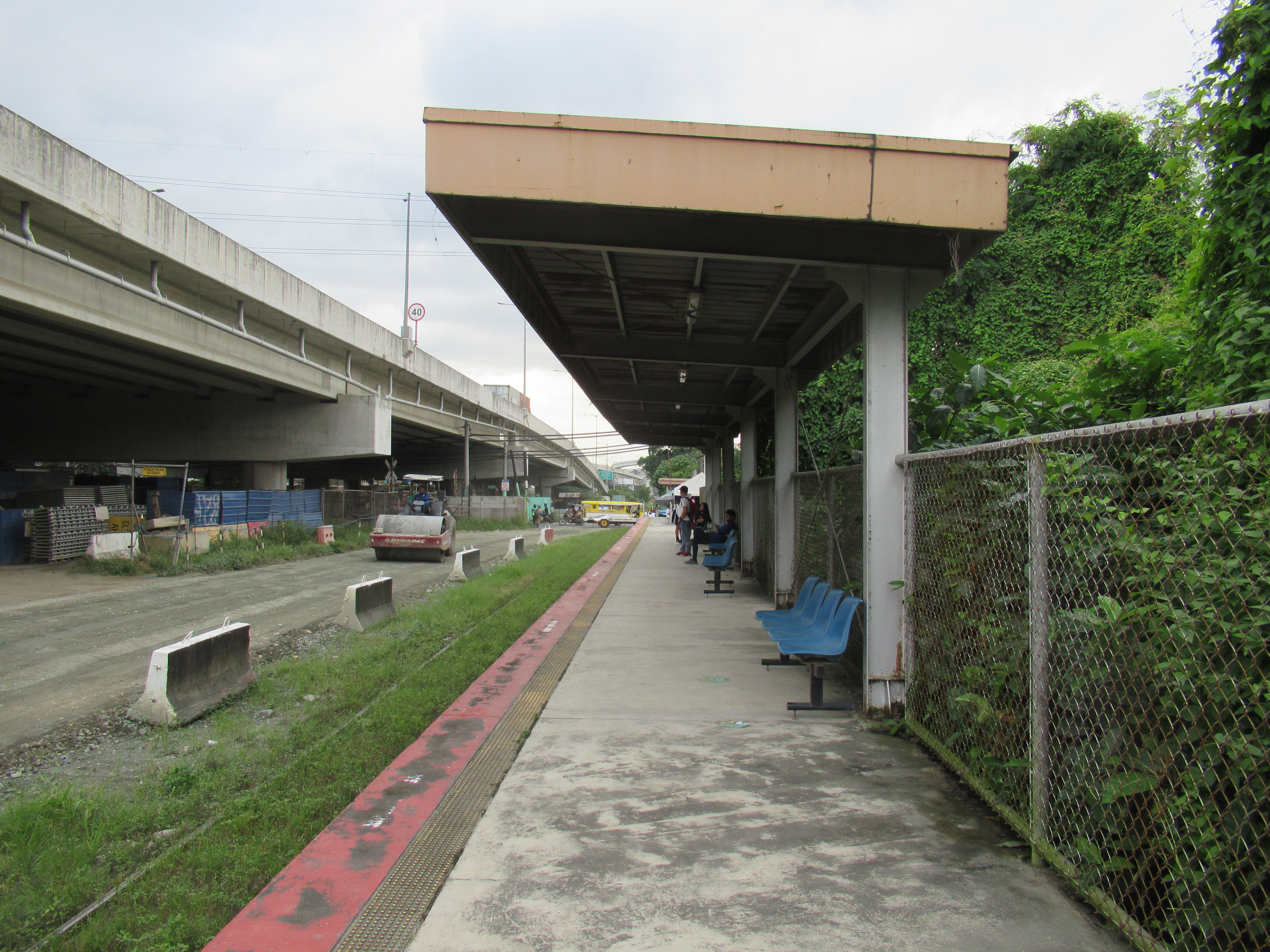
- 10th Avenue railway station in 2022

General information
- Other names: Asistio Avenue
- Location: 10th Avenue, Caloocan
- Coordinates: 14°39′5.75″N 120°58′29.53″E
- Owner: Philippine National Railways
- Operator: Philippine National Railways
- Lines: North Main Line; Planned: North Commuter
- Platforms: Side platforms
- Tracks: 1

Construction
- Structure type: At grade
- Accessible: Yes

Other information
- Status: Closed

History
- Opened: August 1, 2018

Services
Preceding station	PNR	Following station
Caloocan towards Governor Pascual	North Shuttle	5th Avenue station towards Bicutan
Caloocan towards Governor Pascual	Metro North Commuter	5th Avenue station towards Tutuban
Location
- Location within Metro Manila Location within Luzon Location within Philippines

10th Avenue station (also called Asistio Avenue station) is a railway station located on the North Main Line in Caloocan, Metro Manila, Philippines, near the original Caloocan railway station. It is currently being repurposed to become a station of the under-construction North–South Commuter Railway.

The station was meant to be a part of a revived commuter rail system, built during the term of Gloria Macapagal Arroyo. After being constructed, no services to this station were ever provided until August 1, 2018, when it was opened for the Caloocan-Dela Rosa shuttle line. The northbound line is temporarily dismantled to give way for further works in NLEX Segment 10.1, and is currently a temporary single-line track. It was the terminus of said line until the clearing and recondition of the rails in the Caloocan station at Samson Road finished. The line has since been upgraded to terminate at FTI station, with this station no longer the terminus since September 10.

Due to nearly a decade of disuse since its construction, the station has been weathered and its gate barriers no longer functioning. It did not have running electricity until shortly after its reactivation. The gate barriers for the northbound street was made functional again along with its alarm horns thereafter.

== Nearby landmarks ==
The station is near major landmarks such as the PNR Compound, PNR Caloocan Railway Depot, Poblacion Market, old Caloocan City Hall, Caloocan Central Judiciary Complex, La Consolacion College-Caloocan and Caloocan Cathedral. Further away from the station are the new Caloocan City Hall and schools such as Caloocan Science High School, Caloocan High School, Systems Plus Computer College and University of Caloocan City. Further east and west are motorcycle parts and shop dealers along Mabini and 10th Avenue itself.

== Transportation links ==
The station is accessible by jeepneys plying routes from A. Mabini Street through 11th Avenue in Caloocan.

Rail skates and rickshaws occasionally run along the line, providing an alternate source of transportation, though before the construction of NLEX Harbor Link. This was the only line to access to the Caloocan railway depot.

The elevated expressway for NLEX Harbor Link is located immediately beside the railway station, with neighboring houses demolished for the construction.

== Station layout ==
L1; Platforms	Side platform, doors will open on the left
L1; Platforms	Platform	PNR Metro Commuter towards FTI and Tutuban (←)
L1; Platforms	Platform	PNR Metro Commuter towards Governor Pascual and Caloocan railway depot (→)
L1	Concourse/ Street Level	Ticket Booths, Station Control, Shops, old Caloocan City Hall, Caloocan Judicial Complex, Caloocan Cathedral, Poblacion Market
