= Philippine National Railways =

Railway company in the Philippines

- Network map, showing active lines (orange), inactive lines (black), historically proposed lines (gray) and the under-construction North South Commuter Railway (red).

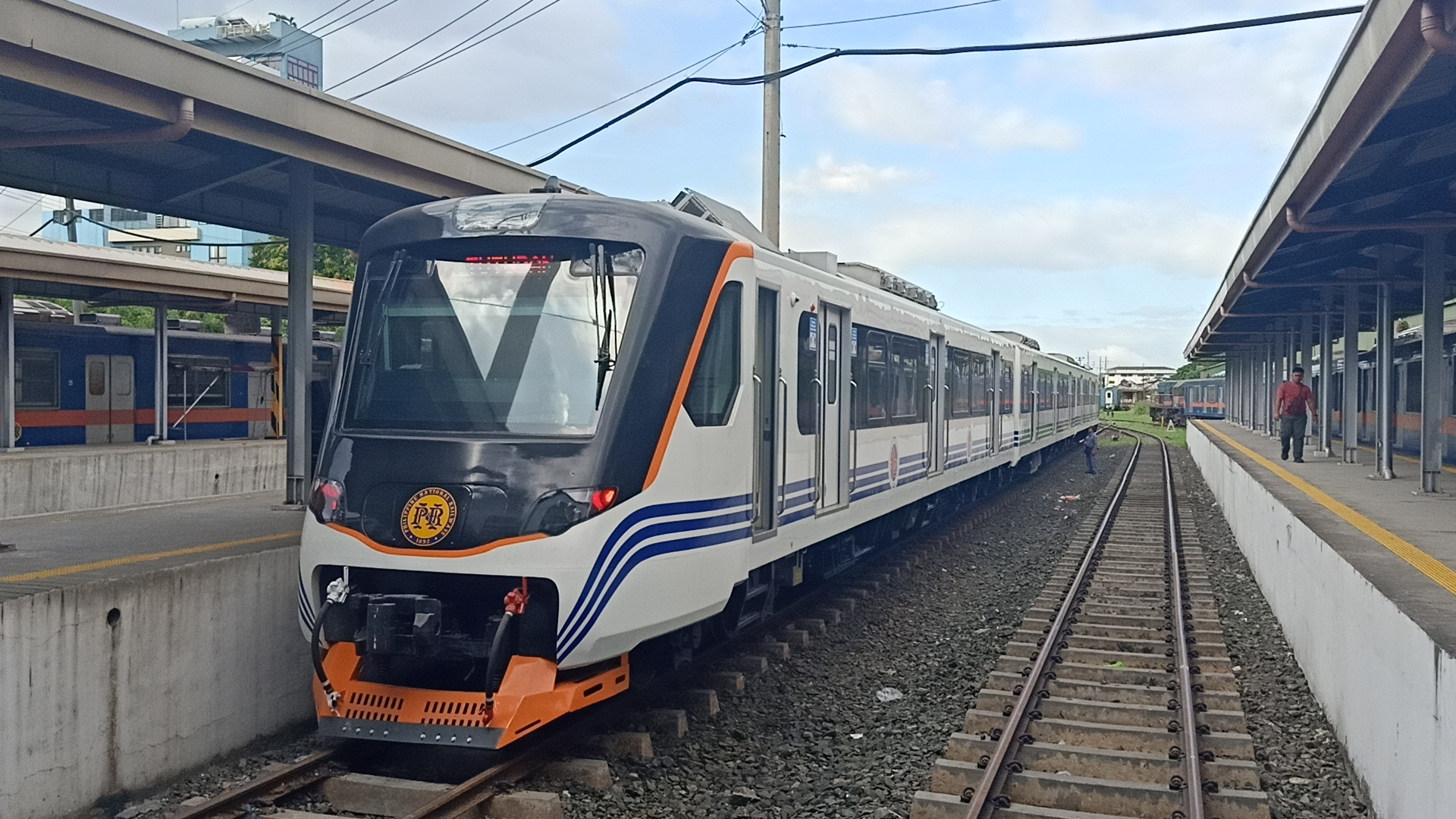
- A PNR 8000 class at Tutuban station

Overview
- Main regions: Metro Manila, Calabarzon, Bicol Region
- Stations operated: 138
- Parent company: Government of the Philippines under the Department of Transportation
- Headquarters: Tutuban, Tondo, Manila
- Key people: Richard F. Peralta (Chairman); Deovanni Miranda (General Manager)
- Locale: Luzon
- Dates of operation: June 20, 1964; 62 years ago–present
- Predecessors: Manila Railroad Company

Technical
- Track gauge: 1,067 mm (3 ft 6 in); 1,435 mm (4 ft 8 1/2 in) standard gauge (future)
- Electrification: 1,500 V DC overhead lines: North–South Commuter Railway (future)
- Length: 133.09 km (82.70 mi) (active) (Note: Total active line length, not including track length for the double-track section from Governor Pascual station in Malabon to Calamba. Total length includes additional 44 km (27 mi) for the Inter-Provincial Commuter which opened on June 26, 2022. 479 km (298 mi) including the derelict and inactive South Main Line between Manila and Legazpi, but still intact as of 2021. The system meanwhile peaked at 1,140 km (710 mi) of trackage in 1941. As of 2020, the government has proposed at least quadruple the peak track length.)
- Operating speed: 20–40 km/h (12–25 mph)

Other
- Website: pnr.gov.ph

The Philippine National Railways (PNR; Filipino: Pambansang Daang-bakal ng Pilipinas; Spanish: Ferrocarril Nacional de Filipinas) is a state-owned railway company in the Philippines which operates one commuter rail service between Laguna and Quezon, and local services between Sipocot, Naga, Lupi, and Legazpi in the Bicol Region. It is an attached agency of the Department of Transportation, formerly known as the Ferrocaril Manila-Dagupan Line, and less well-known Manila Railroad (MRR).

Philippine National Railways traces its roots to the Ferrocarril de Manila-Dagupan, founded on November 24, 1892, during the Spanish colonial period, and later becoming the Manila Railroad Company (MRR) during the American colonial period. Founded on June 20, 1964, by virtue of Republic Act No. 4156, the PNR used to operate over 1,100 km (684 mi) of route from La Union to the Bicol Region. However, neglect reduced the railway's service, and persistent problems with informal settlers in the 1990s and natural disasters in the 2000s contributed further to its decline. The government is currently in the process of reinvesting in the railway through numerous projects set to revive defunct lines and create new ones. However, multiple delays, such as funding issues and project changes, are currently hindering their implementation.

== History ==
=== Manila Railroad ===
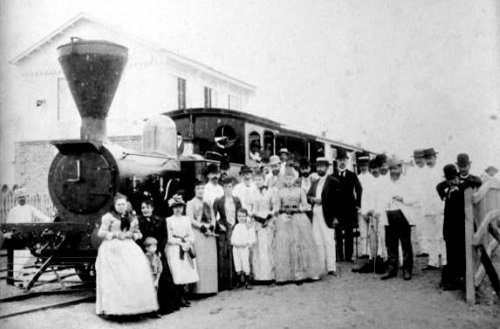
Passengers posing in front of the "Ferrocarril de Manila y Dagupan" (c. 1885).

The origins of the Philippine National Railways can be traced to Edmund Sykes's concession, the Manila Railway Company, Limited. Sykes was granted concession rights by the Spanish government to construct a rail line from Manila to Dagupan on June 1, 1887. The line opened as the Ferrocarril de Manila a Dagupan on November 24, 1892, and the Manila Railway Company was formally incorporated in Manila and London. The Ferrocarril de Manila a Dagupan would eventually become the North Main Line, while services to Southern Luzon under the South Main Line would be completed by 1937.

The Manila Railway was later renamed the Manila Railroad Company in 1906 and became a state-owned enterprise in 1916. By 1923, the MRR elected José Paez as its first Filipino general manager. By 1939, the MRR had 1,140 kilometers (710 mi) of track throughout Luzon. However, the MRR's network and fleet was destroyed during World War II. With most of the railroads rebuilt by the 1950s, the MRR initiated its transition from steam to diesel power. Flagship services with steam ended on August 12, 1956, while regular services ended in 1963. Not long after, the Manila Railroad was reorganized into the Philippine National Railways.

=== Creation of the PNR and later decline ===
The Philippine National Railways was created in 1964 through the Republic Act 4156 during the presidency of Diosdado Macapagal. According to the PNR's website, the agency experienced its heyday during its early years in the 1960s and early 1970s, as it served thousands of daily riders in its system and had an expansive commuter rail network in and out of Metro Manila.

The PNR later suffered from a multitude of reasons which contributed to its decline, including natural disasters and a lack of support from the government. Government funding during the 1970s were shifted to road-based infrastructure such as highways. On July 23, 1979, President Ferdinand Marcos issued Executive Order No. 546, which designated the Philippine National Railways as an attached agency of the Ministry of Transportation and Communications, now the Department of Transportation (DOTr). However, it did not prevent the agency from suffering heavy losses. In 1983, underfunding resulted in more cutting of services and the layoff of 1,000 employees which resulted in protests the following year.

The decline of the railway became evident as sections of North Main Line closed in stages. In 1984, services were cut short to Paniqui, Tarlac due to a bridge collapse. Services were then again cut short to Caloocan in 1988 during the term of President Corazon Aquino. However, commuter services were briefly extended to Malolos starting in 1990 under the Metrotren project and later closed in 1997. When Fidel V. Ramos succeeded Aquino, he decided to rehabilitate the South Main Line from Tutuban to Legaspi, and appointed Jose B. Dado as the new PNR general manager. A railway system running from Manila to Clark was also set to be constructed in the 1990s, when Ramos signed a memorandum of agreement with Juan Carlos I of Spain for its construction in September 1994. Another project, called the Manila–Calabarzon Express, sought to rehabilitate the south commuter line in Manila and construct spur lines. However, the two projects were not implemented, with the Clark railway project cancelled due to disagreement on the source of funding.

=== Contemporary history ===
==== Rehabilitation ====
The government under the administration of Gloria Macapagal Arroyo actively pursued the rehabilitation of the Philippine National Railways through various investments and projects designed to revive Philippine rail transport, despite the numerous problems involved. This encompassed three major projects: Northrail, Southrail, and the Northrail–Southrail Linkage, which was designed to connect the two systems. The 320-kilometer (200-mile) Northrail project aimed to revive the North Main Line from Caloocan to San Fernando, La Union. The initial phase involved the upgrading of the existing single track to an elevated dual-track system, converting the rail gauge from narrow gauge to standard gauge, and linking Manila to Malolos in Bulacan and further on to Angeles City, Clark Special Economic Zone, Clark International Airport. Although the project was under the North Luzon Railways Corporation (NLRC), the Northrail project aimed to utilize the existing right of way of the North Main Line for most of its route. The Southrail project, conceptualized when the PNR and Daewoo conducted a feasibility study, involved the rehabilitation of the entire South Main Line from Calamba to Lucena, and later to Legazpi, Albay, with a new extension to Matnog. The linkage project aimed to connect the two, and ensure compatibility of the signaling and communication systems of the two lines while retaining the rail gauge as narrow gauge despite the planned gauge conversion.

On September 14, 2002, a memorandum of understanding was signed by NLRC and China National Machinery and Equipment Group (CNMEG) for the Northrail project. The Northrail project was contracted out by the Arroyo administration in 2003 to China National Machinery and Equipment Corporation (CNMEC) for an original cost of $421 million. This project was estimated to cost around US$500 million, with China offering to provide some US$400 million in concessionary financing. Early construction began in 2006. However, the project would soon be plagued by a series of irregularities involving the foreign contractor, leading to repeated halts and restarts of the project; the cost of the railway later surged to US$2 billion.

On July 14, 2009, President Arroyo presided over the launch of new diesel multiple units from Hyundai Rotem. This coincided with PNR's rebranding under a new brand name, PNR Filtrack, although the succeeding administration decided to revert these changes. While plans for Southrail were not fully realized, the initial phase of the linkage project from Caloocan to Alabang, financed by the Export–Import Bank of Korea and the Korean Economic Development Cooperation Fund, was completed in 2010. Total reconstruction of rail bridges and tracks, including replacement of the current 35-kilogram (77-pound) track with newer 50-kilogram (110-pound) tracks and the refurbishing of stations, were part of the rehabilitation and expansion process.

Northrail was finally cancelled in 2011 by President Benigno Aquino III on lingering legal issues and corruption allegations. Nevertheless, rehabilitation of the railway continued, with the San Cristobal bridge in Calamba, Laguna being rebuilt in May 2011. The Bicol Express train service was inaugurated on June 29, with a maiden voyage between Manila and Naga, Camarines Sur plus a return trip back to the terminus on July 1. This inaugural trip was marred by the collapse of the embankment at Malaguico, Sipocot. It was discovered before the train passed through and was repaired. The restored Bicol Express intercity service was offered on a daily basis, running mostly during nighttime. Following a derailment incident, the Bicol Express service was indefinitely suspended on October 26, 2012, leaving only the Metro Commuter Line in operation.

==== Current developments ====
Despite attempts to restart and reconfigure the Northrail project, by 2015, it was replaced by a new project that sought to revitalize the PNR, called the North–South Railway Project (NSRP), was approved by the government. It involved two lines, NSRP North and South. The north line is analogous to the existing North Main Line; its first phase is the North–South Commuter Railway (NSCR), a 37-kilometer (23-mile), electrified narrow gauge commuter railway from Tutuban to Malolos funded through official development assistance (ODA) from Japan. The second phase entailed the rebuilding of the line's long-haul services to La Union. Meanwhile, the south line included the reconstruction of the existing Metro Commuter line from Tutuban to Calamba as well as the rehabilitation of the South Main Line with an extension up to Matnog, Sorsogon and a branch line from Calamba to Batangas. The latter phase of the north line, as well as the entire south line, were to be funded through a public–private partnership (PPP) scheme.

These plans would later be modified by the succeeding government under President Rodrigo Duterte. The NSCR was extended to New Clark City. It was also expanded to include the reconstruction of the Metro Commuter line, which was now also to be financed through ODA from Japan. Meanwhile, the planned long-haul portion of the south line was reconstituted as the South Long Haul project, which would involve the reconstruction of the South Main Line. It was to be funded by China, although this was later withdrawn after several delays and a slow negotiation process with the Chinese government. Furthermore, all new railway lines were now to be constructed using standard gauge, as opposed to the narrow gauge that is currently in use by PNR.

After nearly 20 years, PNR reopened the Metro North Commuter line, and launched the Caloocan–Dela Rosa shuttle line, on August 1, 2018. This would be followed by a steady expansion and reintroduction of rail services to the north, currently reaching to Malabon, which has not seen rail activity for nearly 20 years. A plan to reactivate the Carmona line was bared as well, and the revival of cargo rail from Port Area, Manila to Laguna is now being planned.

On November 16, 2018, PNR became a provisional member of International Union of Railways. On June 14, 2019, PNR became ISO 9001-certified (ISO 9001:2015) for railway repair, rehabilitation, restoration and maintenance, train control and rolling stock maintenance, station operation and other related services. The certification was announced on October 2, 2019.

On February 16, 2023, the Department of Transportation announced a temporary suspension of operations of the PNR system for five years to give way for the construction of the NSCR. Transport Undersecretary for Railways Cesar Chavez said that the temporary suspension would save the government ₱15 billion while construction on the new railway line is ongoing. The Alabang–Calamba segment was the first to be closed on July 2, while the Tutuban–Alabang segment followed suit on March 28, 2024. New PUV franchises traversing parallel the PNR route were issued to compensate for the five-year closure. Services in the Bicol Region were expanded on December 23, 2023.

== Operations and services ==
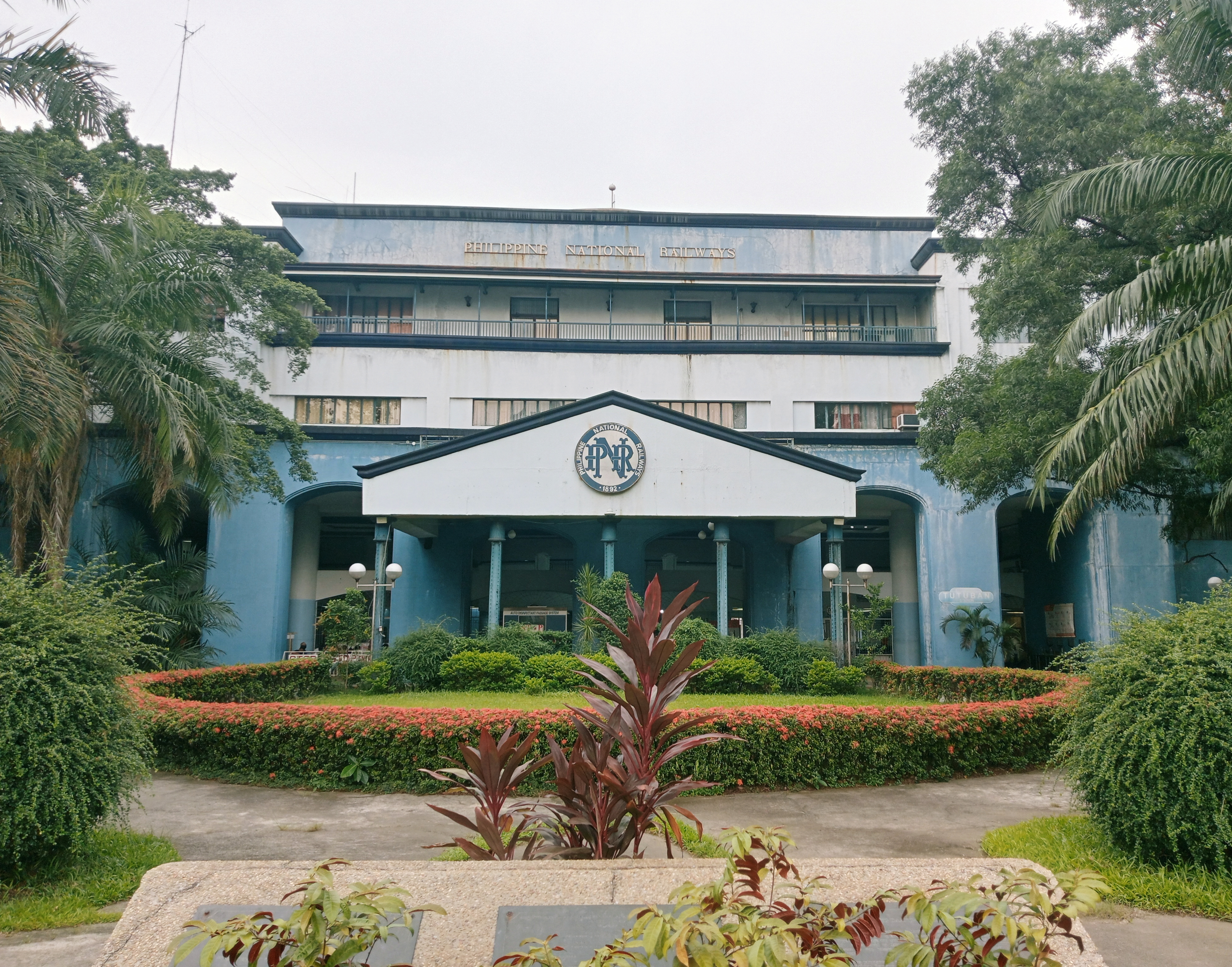
PNR Executive Building in Manila

The PNR currently operates in Laguna, Quezon and Bicol region. At the last years of regular intercity service along the system's entire length in the late 1980s, it served from Tutuban to San Fernando, La Union on the North Main Line and Legazpi, Albay on the South Main Line. Various branch lines also led to Batangas, Cavite, Nueva Ecija, Rizal and Tarlac. One of the branch lines that led to Carmona was intended to be reopened by 2019. This was not yet realized as of March 2020, presumably due to the COVID-19 pandemic, among other developments.

On March 27, 2024, the PNR suspended its operations in Metro Manila, specifically the Gov. Pascual to Bicutan and the Tutuban to Alabang segments for at least five years to make way for the construction of the North-South Commuter Railway (NSCR), which will run on the same route as the old tracks, albeit elevated and will use electrification and the standard gauge, the first in PNR. The old tracks beneath the elevated segments will be restored for future freight services as well as connection to the PNR South Main Line and eventually the South Long Haul.

The PNR operates almost every day of the year unless otherwise announced. Special schedules are announced via the social media pages of the agency and also in newspapers and other mass media. During Holy Week, a public holiday in the Philippines, operations are suspended for annual maintenance, owing to fewer commuters and traffic around the metro. Normal operation resumes on Easter Sunday.

=== Summary of services ===
Service	Termini		Status
Metro South Commuter (MSC)	Tutuban	Alabang	Suspended
Metro South Commuter (MSC)	Tutuban	Mamatid	Discontinued
Metro South Commuter (MSC)	Tutuban	Calamba	Suspended
Metro South Commuter (MSC)	Tutuban	IRRI (UP Los Baños)	Suspended
Metro South Commuter (MSC)	Tutuban	San Pedro	Suspended
Metro North Commuter (MNC)	Tutuban	Governor Pascual	Suspended
Metro North Commuter (MNC)	Tutuban	Valenzuela	Planned
Inter-Provincial Commuter	San Pablo	Lucena	Operational
Inter-Provincial Commuter	Calamba	Lucena	Operational
Inter-Provincial Commuter	Calamba	San Pablo	Operational
Shuttle Service (SS)	Governor Pascual	Bicutan	Suspended
Shuttle Service (SS)	Valenzuela	Bicutan	Planned
Shuttle Service (SS)	Dela Rosa	Carmona	Planned
Shuttle Service (SS)	Tutuban	Sucat	Discontinued
Shuttle Service (SS)	Santa Mesa	Sucat	Discontinued
Shuttle Service (SS)	Alabang	Calamba	Planned
Premiere Train	Tutuban	Mamatid	Discontinued
Bicol Commuter Train (BCT)	Tagkawayan	Naga	
Bicol Commuter Train (BCT)	Lupi	Naga	Operational
Bicol Commuter Train (BCT)	Naga	Legazpi	Suspended
Bicol Express (BEx)	Tutuban	Naga	Suspended
Bicol Express (BEx)	Tutuban	Ligao	Suspended
Mayon Limited Deluxe (MLD)	Tutuban	Ligao	Discontinued; replaced by ILE
Mayon Limited Ordinary (MLO)	Tutuban	Ligao	Discontinued; replaced by ILE
Isarog Limited Express (ILE)	Tutuban	Naga	Suspended

=== Bicol Commuter ===
The Bicol Commuter service is a commuter rail service in the Bicol Region, between stations in Tagkawayan, and Legazpi, with Naga in Camarines Sur acting as a central terminal. It has three services: Tagkawayan-Naga (suspended), Lupi Viejo-Naga (operational), and Naga-Legazpi (suspended)

The service was first launched on September 16, 2009, as Tagkawayan-Naga and Naga-Ligao. The trains were planned to make seven trips a day, alternating between Tagkawayan, Sipocot, Naga City and Legazpi. All services used KiHa 52 in revised blue livery.

However, after further reductions, only the service between Sipocot and Naga was operating by December 2013. Service resumed between Naga and Legazpi on September 18, 2015, with one train a day. However, services were again cut in April 2017 due to an absence of rolling stock, which was worsened by a succession of typhoons that damaged railroads in the Bicol region.

Definitive plans to restore the entire route from Sipocot, Naga and Legazpi were bared with an inspection trip from Tutuban on September 20, 2019, with a rerailment crew, including certain areas of Quezon Province, in preparation of the restoration of more routes previously suspended. First to be restored was the operation of the Naga-Sipocot segment of the Bicol Commuter service in 2022. On 31 July 2023, the PNR resumed operations between Ligao and Naga, with two daily trips in service. The Naga–Legazpi route was reopened on December 27, 2023, six years after its suspension in April 2017 due to insufficient trains.

As of 2024, the train used for the Naga-Legazpi Line is the 8300 class coaches pulled by a INKA CC300 locomotive, while the 8000 class DMU is used in the Naga-Sipocot Line.

With the PNR undertaking continual maintenance and repairs since the 2012 South Main Line suspension, the Bicol Commuter was finally extended beyond Sipocot to Lupi Viejo on November 5, 2025.

On November 10, 2025, Bicol Commuter services on the Naga-Legazpi route were suspended after Typhoon Uwan caused significant damage to a bridge along the route in Guinobatan, Albay, with the Department of Transport (DOTr) immediately issuing a directive to fast-track repairs. Despite an initial reopening date of February 2026, services remain suspended as of July 2026. An inspection of the bridge was carried out on July 13, 2026, and damaged sleepers were removed while PNR continues the procurement process for machinery and materials to carry out the repair.

=== Inter-Provincial Commuter ===
The Inter-Provincial Commuter is a 77-kilometer (48 mi) commuter and regional rail service from San Pablo to Calamba, Laguna and San Pablo to Lucena, Quezon.

In the lead up to the service commencing, a PNR 9000 class locomotive No. 9003, PNR 8300 class trainset 8302 and a LC350 class switcher were transferred from Manila to San Pablo on February 13, 2022. That same day, a fare matrix was published by PNR. The service made its first trial run on February 14, 2022, and was reopened on June 26. The service currently runs using PNR 8000 class DMU 8001 without any operational spare trainsets allocated, causing service cancellations when 8001 needs maintenance.

== Defunct services ==
=== Metro Commuter Line ===
==== Metro North Commuter ====
The reactivated Metro North Commuter ran initially from Caloocan to Makati and uses a single special fare matrix of ₱12.00 for ordinary, and ₱15.00 for air-conditioned. This was later extended to reach FTI in Taguig, now with a distance-based fare matrix. A Caloocan-Tutuban shuttle service also exists, using the original right-of-way once used for the Dagupan line. Originally terminating at 10th Avenue station while the historical Caloocan station was still being prepared for activation, the station now terminates at its originally intended station since September 10.

DOTr and PNR have laid out plans in reactivating rail services in areas prepared for NorthRail, such as Malabon and possibly Valenzuela. First proposed and planned last September 2018, the extension to Gov. Pascual Avenue and the re-establishment of the Governor Pascual Station (formerly called Acacia Station) in Malabon has been done, with new rail ties and narrow gauge rail tracks restored. It reopened to the public on December 3, 2018.

Another extension, this time targeting Valenzuela City (Polo area) has been bared on August 14, 2019, and will require rebuilding a railway bridge crossing Tullahan river that has been previously demolished.

The line is provisional, and services were interrupted with the construction of NSCR elevated tracks underway, with the northern area commencing upon the conclusion of the construction of NLEX Segment 10.1. However, despite the new rails being removed again, the at-grade reconstructed lines will be retained and are targeted for freight use as well as part of the system's extension/reintroduction to the north.

The trains used in this service was the Hyundai Rotem DMUs and 8000 class DMUs, with the KiHa 52 DMU and KiHa 350 DMU formerly used in this service.

==== Metro South Commuter ====
The Metro Commuter (also known by then-remaining active service MSC or Metro South Commuter), which was formerly called Commuter Express (also Commex), served as the commuter rail service for the Manila metropolitan area, extending as far south as Calamba and Los Baños, both in Laguna. The PNR used GE locomotives such as 900 Class, 2500 Class, and 5000 Class hauling 203 series EMUs, including 18 (3 car trains, 6 sets) Hyundai Rotem DMUs, KiHa 52 DMUs, the PT INKA 8000 class DMUs, 8100 class DMUs, and the INKA CC300 locomotive with 8300 class coaches for this service. The 8000 class DMUs occasionally performed MSC trips when the Hyundai Rotem DMUs occupy the Metro North Commuter trips. The GE locomotives formerly haul 7A-2000 12 series Commex passenger coaches. MSC service using the Hyundai Rotem DMUs, KiHa 52, KiHa 350, 203 series EMUs, 8000 class and 8100 class DMUs, and the INKA CC300 locomotive with 8300 class coaches was offered between Tutuban and Alabang in Muntinlupa.

==== Shuttle Service ====
The Shuttle Service is a commuter rail service initially introduced on January 27, 2014. This service used Hyundai Rotem DMUs and JR KiHa 52. There were 2 routes of the Shuttle Service, where trains stop at all stations along the routes: Tutuban – Sucat and Santa Mesa – Sucat. This train service ended May 23, 2014, to conduct maintenance on the rolling stocks and due to the consecutive three weeks of delays and cancellations of this train service.

Formerly, plans for a third route plying Alabang – Calamba was to be introduced sometime in 2017. This service would use the reliveried two-car KiHa 350; This did not push through in 2018. However, with the commissioning of the new DOST Hybrid Train in 2019, this route is now under test run, currently free of charge, but with limited schedules.

In 2018, a new shuttle line was introduced with the 10th Avenue – Dela Rosa route since August 1, 2018, as part of the renovation of the line and the return of train services to Caloocan. The revived train service had its first extension towards Sangandaan, the original Caloocan station since September 10, extending through FTI. Since December 3, 2018, the line was extended northwards to Governor Pascual (formerly called Acacia) in Malabon, and since December 16, 2019, the shuttle service was extended southwards to Bicutan as its new terminus from FTI.

A new shuttle line leading to the once-abandoned Carmona branch line was planned for reopening in 2019, but it was not yet realized as of 2026. It would have originated from Dela Rosa station in Makati.

=== Intercity services ===
PNR's intercity operations on its two main lines, the North Main Line and South Main Line, both located in Luzon, have been indefinitely suspended since 2014.

The South Main Line then served as the primary intercity service after the permanent closure of the northern line in 1991. However, PNR also ended its regular intercity services in 2006 due to natural disasters and poor track conditions, although the Bicol Express ran irregularly between 2009 and 2014. In Camarines Sur, liquefaction of the track's embankment caused a section of the line in Sipocot to sink. This allowed the inaugural service of the new Bicol Express in 2011 to slow down to a near-stop while passing through the area.

There are plans to revitalize both lines. The North Main Line is currently reserved for building the fully-elevated portion of the North–South Commuter Railway to Capas, Tarlac. The South Main Line is planned to be rebuilt and extended to Matnog, Sorsogon. The spur line to Batangas City will also be rebuilt. Test runs along the South Main Line were conducted in September 2019. On September 21, 2019, a KiHa 59 and a rerailment train consisting of a newly repainted PNR 900 class locomotive and a CMC coach conducted a test run from Tutuban to Naga.

==== North Main Line services ====
The North Main Line was first opened when the Manila–Dagupan Railway was opened in 1892. At its height between the 1950s and 1960s, the line once boasted full double-track railways from Tutuban to Dagupan and also served until San Fernando, La Union. It also had branch lines to various areas in Central Luzon. However, its services severely deteriorated in the 1980s. All regular operations outside Metro Manila ended in 1988. However, there was irregular service to Meycauayan railway station until all stations in Central Luzon were closed by the 1991 eruption of Mount Pinatubo.

==== South Main Line services ====
Intercity services on the South Main Line ran between Manila and Legazpi between 1916 and 2014, including the intermittent Bicol Express and Mayon/Isarog Limited services between 2009 and 2014. The services also briefly extended to Sorsogon in the 1960s due to the trains' popularity as a form of transportation with the masses.

=== Non-passenger services ===
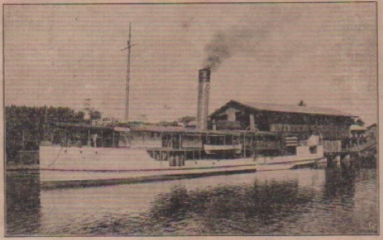
SS Mayon, one of two ferries used to link two segments of the South Main Line prior to unification in 1938.

Freight services used to be a key component of PNR's operations, and the same applies to its predecessors being the Manila Railway and Railroad companies. Freight services lasted until 2003 when International Container Terminal Services used PNR tracks to transfer intermodal containers from the Port of Manila to its facility in Cabuyao, Laguna. Since then, there have been proposals to revive freight services as part of its PNR Long Haul projects.

The Manila Railroad was also the owner of the Manila Hotel during its early years prior to its handover to the Government Services Insurance System. They also hosted "hospital trains" in the 1930s, with 70 class tank locomotive No. 79 and a converted American Car-built express coach used as a hospital.

== Station list ==
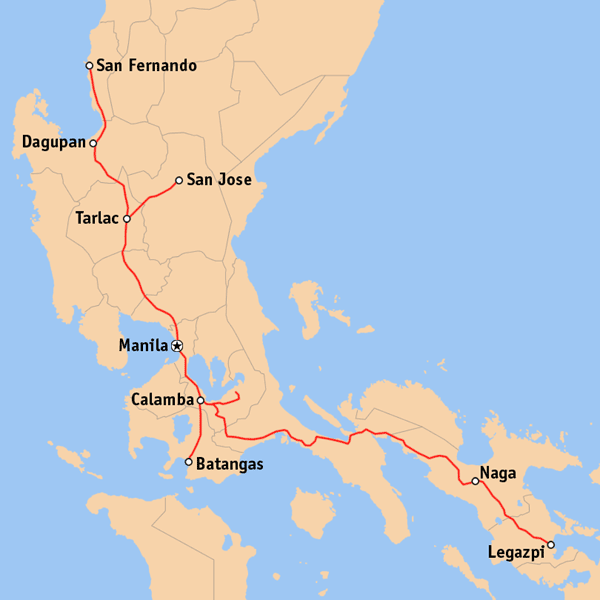
Entire line map of PNR with major stations. Includes defunct lines.

The Philippine National Railways operates on two main lines, the North Main Line and the South Main Line, alongside three major spur lines, which served various parts of Luzon with its 138 (once) active stations.

=== Station layout ===
All PNR stations were and are presently at-grade, with most stations using a side platform layout. Most have only basic amenities, platforms and ticket booths. Rehabilitated stations along the Metro Manila line have been fitted with ramps for passengers using wheelchairs. Several stations have extended platforms, having an upper platform catering to DMU services, and a lower platform for regular locomotive-hauled services. As of August 2017, most of the stations are being extended and equipped with platform-length roofing, better ticketing office, and restrooms.

Future railway systems under the PNR, such as the North–South Commuter Railway line, will have elevated, at-grade, and depressed stations similar to that of Manila LRT and MRT stations.

== Modernization and expansion plans ==
The expanded network of rail transport in the Philippines before 2016.

The PNR system has suffered from decades of neglect and therefore, several plans to restore and expand the network has been proposed by various administrations. The Republic of Korea, the People's Republic of China, Japan and Indonesia have contributed to these plans. Most of these concern the revitalization and modernization projects of the mainlines in Luzon. The government plans a complete overhaul of the PNR system, which involves electrification and conversion from narrow gauge to standard gauge, as well as from single to double track. The standard gauge system is estimated to have a total track length of around 4,000 km (2,500 mi).

=== Urban rail systems ===
==== North–South Commuter Railway ====
The North–South Commuter Railway (NSCR) is the latest project to revitalize both the historic North and South Main Lines, particularly sections in the Greater Manila Area. First planned in the 1990s, the project's previous incarnations were hounded by funding problems and disagreements. It finally came into shape in November 2017 after a resolution of a five-year dispute between the government and a Chinese contractor. The NSCR will be a 36 station, 147 km (91 mi) elevated railway system from New Clark City in Capas, Tarlac to Calamba, Laguna. It will be the first electrified main line in the country. Construction on the railway began in 2019. Once fully completed by 2027, it will accommodate at least 300,000 passengers between Northern Metro Manila and Bulacan alone. While the elevated line will be served by electrified trains, the existing lines below will be used for freight trains and/or existing commuter trains.

==== MRT Line 8 ====
As part of the infrastructure program by president Rodrigo Duterte, East-West Rail was proposed by the East-West Rail Transit Corp., a consortium between Megawide, A. Brown Company Inc., and Private Equity Investment and Development Corp. It involves the financing, design, construction, and maintenance of a mostly-elevated rapid transit line from Diliman in Quezon City to Quiapo in Manila. In 2018, the PNR has said that it will help in building and operating the line. The line will have 11 stations on 9.4 kilometers (5.8 mi) of mostly elevated track. The project is currently awaiting approval from NEDA to proceed. It is also currently tackling right-of-way issues, such as that of the España Boulevard alignment. As of 2026, no updates were made.

=== Intercity rail systems ===
==== PNR South Long Haul ====
The South Long Haul project, also known as PNR Bicol, is a planned reconstruction of the intercity line between Metro Manila and the Bicol Region. Originally proposed as a simple reconstruction of the existing network at narrow-gauge and a maximum speed of 75 km/h (47 mph), the project now involves a complete overhaul of the railway and its conversion to standard-gauge, replacing the existing line. The line will be initially built as a single-track system. However, there are provisions for an upgrade to double-track or electrification in the future. Stations will be allowed to use passing sidings so that express train travel is uninterrupted.

The project was supposed to be financed by Chinese official development assistance, but they later backed out. Since then, there has been no progress with this project, and land acquisition for the remaining portions is still pending. Despite this, the government has prioritized other projects, such as the rehabilitation of the Maharlika Highway and, more recently, the Bicol International Airport.

==== Mindanao Railway ====
President Rodrigo Duterte expressed his support for the establishment of a railway system in the entire island of Mindanao which could be in operation after his term ends. The railway system to be built in Mindanao will have about 2,000 kilometers of track, and considered one of Rodrigo Duterte's primary infrastructure projects. The first phase, which is 105 kilometers (65 mi), would start construction in the third quarter of 2018 and was expected to be completed by 2022. The project was initially planned to be financed by China’s ODA, but the funding was withdrawn in 2023.

=== Freight revival ===
In 2016, PNR has been interested in reviving its freight services with a planned signing of a memorandum of agreement between the railway and rail freight operator MRAIL (a Meralco subsidiary firm) for the rehabilitation of the rail lines to North Harbor and to restart the freight services starting 2017, which will also help reduce traffic congestion and truck use in the NCR. If completed, MRail will jointly operate the freight service with the PNR, which will end a long absence of railway freight services in the country. This will be the second time the PNR will partner with ICTSI.

A statement made by MRail Inc., a subsidiary of Metro Pacific Investments Corp., said that discussions regarding PNR freight service revival from Port of Manila to the Laguna Gateway Inland Container Terminal resulted in the appointment of a new board at the Philippine National Railways. Representatives of PNR and ICTSI conducted an inspection of the ROW where the former railtracks leading to the North Harbor existed, signalling the start of the action to realize the cargo rail revival.

As of 2021, the freight revival plans are currently not in effect, as with the agency's other railway plans, the cause presumed to be the COVID-19 pandemic.

== Rolling stock ==
PNR has operated several types of locomotives, carriages and multiple units as part of its fleet. As of 2019, the rolling stock used are primarily powered by diesel. The DOST Hybrid Electric Train may also function as a battery electric multiple unit although it is started by a diesel engine. All present rolling stock are in 1,067 mm (3 ft 6 in). PNR also has rail mounted cranes as supporting equipment with varying capacities between 0.5–30 tonnes (1,100–66,100 lb).

In late 2019, improvements with the current rolling stocks have been seen. KiHa 59 KoGaNe, KiHa 350 Set 3, and two sets of Hyundai Rotem DMUs received a new blue-orange livery with window screen. One unit of 900 Class has been overhauled and repainted to blue-orange and filtrack livery. PNR also have expanded their line and added more trips in their service, KoGaNe has served the Tutuban-Calamba Line (Limited Chosen Stops only) from October 24 to December 2, 2019, then got extended to IRRI in Los Baños, Laguna on December 3, 2019. KiHa 350 Set 3 also have served the Alabang-Calamba-IRRI Line but it only lasted a couple of weeks, PNR train will go to bicol after renovation of railway tracks.

== Liveries ==
The Manila-Dagupan Railway, the Manila Railroad Company and the Philippine National Railways sported various liveries representing various eras of the company, usually to celebrate the arrival of new rolling stock. Each of these are painted by hand.

=== Steam locomotive era (1892–1954) ===
There were no available colored images of Manila-Dagupan Railway and the Manila Railroad Company's rolling stock before the war so the color scheme of the carriages remains unknown. However, based on the surviving locomotives, the steam locomotives owned by the two companies sported a black-only livery like most of the notable American steam engines.

=== Railmotor livery (1948) ===
The Cummins railmotors were colored black or white, and orange. The pre-war carriages salvaged and refurbished in the late 1940s also used this color scheme.

=== MRR/PNR livery (1955) ===
Monogram of the PNR used in the 1960s. The modern PNR seal altered its colors to blue and orange.

The MRR celebrated the arrival of its first diesel rolling stock with its colors changed to dark green and yellow, or alternately to yellow-orange and dark green. The livery was retained when the Philippine government took over and renamed it the Philippine National Railways. During the transition to PNR, the old MRR monogram with a diamond-shaped seal was painted out and the PNR circular seal and monogram was placed on the front of the cab with yellow wing-like symbols outside it. The PNR acronym is also placed on the sides as well. By the 1980s, the diesel multiple units will have a yellow body and the wing-like symbols are colored dark green. A few locomotives sported a yellow-orange livery at that time.

=== Commuter Motor Coach livery (c. 1978) ===
During the late 1970s, the Commuter Motor Coaches used on PNR's local train services in Metro Manila and the Bicol Region was colored white and navy blue.

=== Metrotren livery (1990) ===
When President Corazon Aquino inaugurated the rebranded Manila commuter service as "Metrotren" in 1990, the CMC coaches were repainted to navy blue, white and red. This was also used for the 1998 restocking of the Bicol Express with the old Peñafrancia Express IC-888 train. This was used until the mid-2000s when both multiple unit types were changed to the navy blue livery.

=== Philippines 2000 livery (1997) ===
The GE Universal Series-based 900, 2500 and 5000 classes sported a red livery celebrating Fidel Ramos' Philippines 2000 program. Although the PNR revised this livery after 2000, some retained it due to lack of maintenance funds and a 900 class survived with this livery in use until 2008. Some of the freight carriages had the Philippines 2000 name spray-painted on top the old green and yellow livery.

=== Navy blue livery (c. 2000, 2011) ===
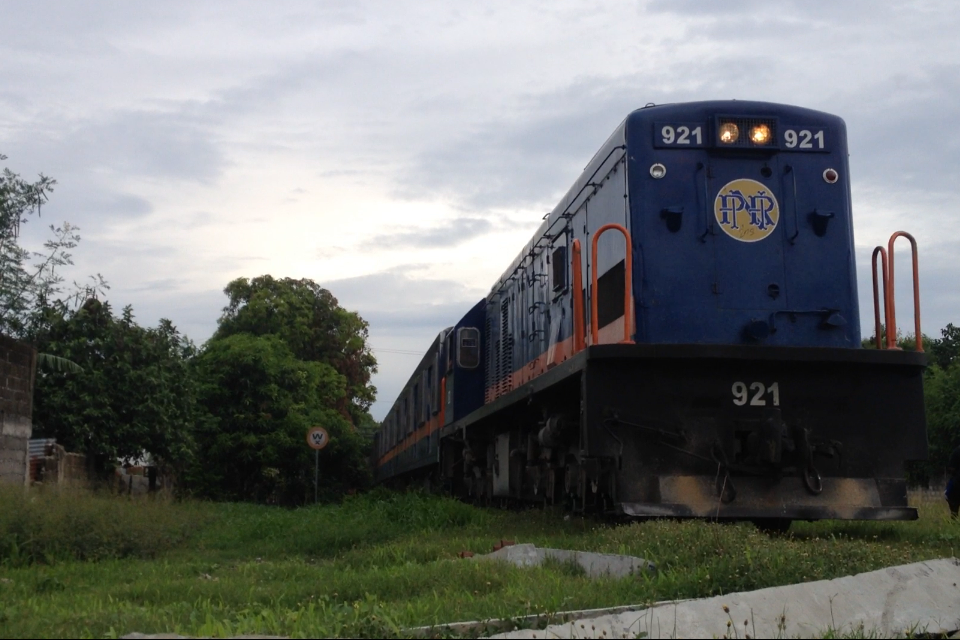
DEL 921 and 203-series coach sporting the 2011-type navy blue livery.

A navy blue livery was introduced after the expiry of the Philippines 2000 program. This followed after PNR acquired locomotive-hauled 12 and 14 series coaches from Japan. There are subtle differences with the coaches used on the Commuter Express (formerly Metrotren) and the Bicol Express. The Commuter Express trainsets were navy blue with orange highlights while the Bicol Express were navy blue with gold highlights. The PNR symbol on the Commuter Express was white while on the Bicol Express was gold. The locomotives' colors were also changed to navy blue and orange.

This livery was re-introduced in 2011 although it was not used on the Bicol Express trainsets.

=== Filtrack livery (2009) ===
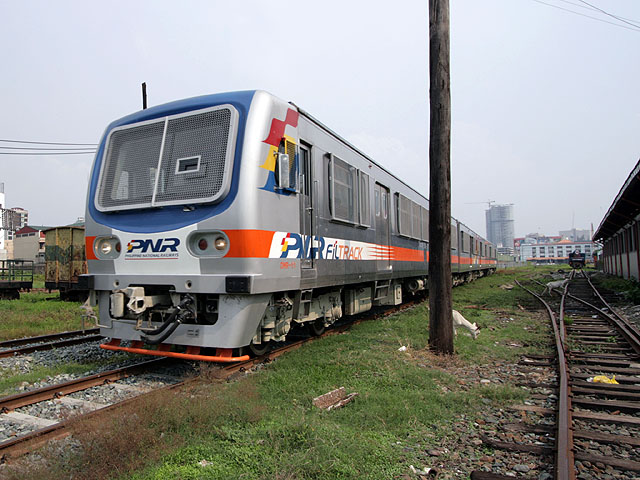
A Hyundai Rotem DMU with the Filtrack livery (2010)

PNR attempted to revitalize the Bicol Express in 2009 with the support of president Gloria Macapagal Arroyo. This was supported with a change of logo and liveries. The coaches in PNR service used white and orange while the locomotives' cabs were colored white while the PNR monogram logo was sealed out. The trains also sported the "Filtrack" brand on the coaches and on the side of the locomotives. However, this was short lived after the Bicol Express stopped its services indefinitely. By 2015, all of the rolling stock followed the 2000s navy blue livery.

=== INKA livery (2019) ===
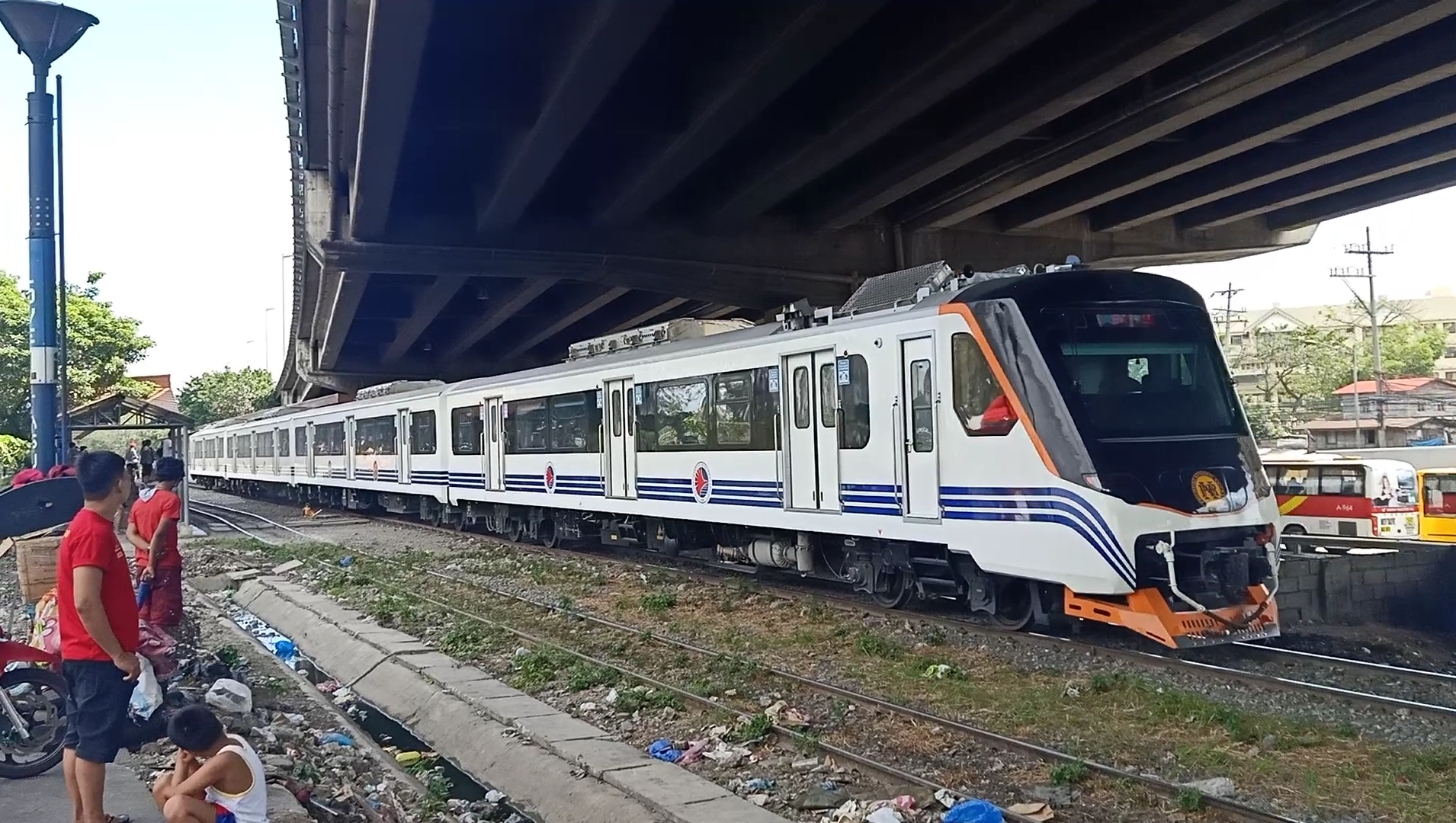
An INKA-built PNR 8100 class with the new livery (February 2020)

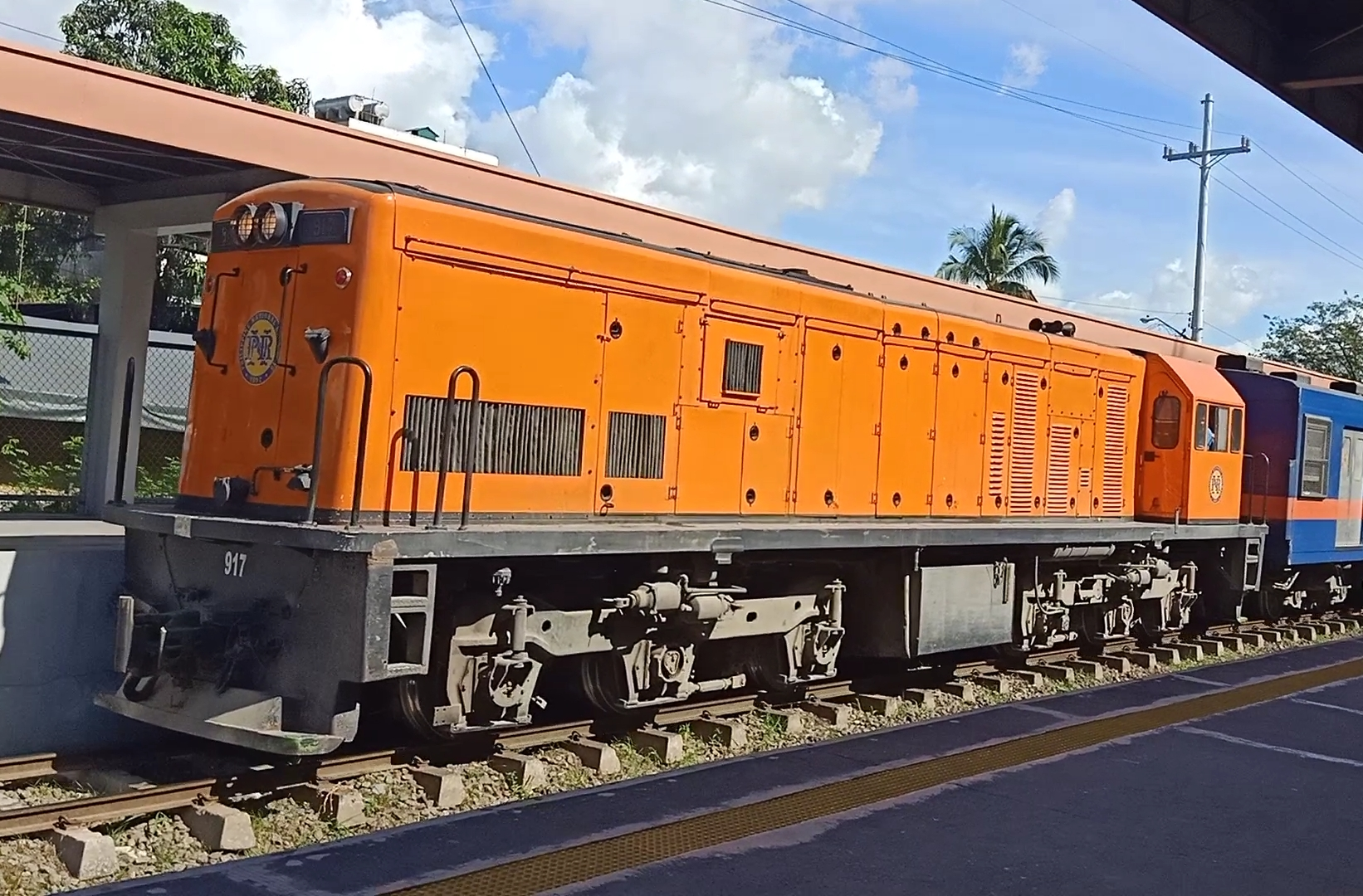
A PNR 900 class locomotive with the pure orange livery (December 2019)

The PNR announced another logo change and changes to its livery in 2019. This is after the Duterte administration under the Department of Transportation announced major reforms to the PNR. The PNR's monogram is now fully incorporated on a seal-type logo, bearing the agency's name and the year it was founded. The seal was also changed from orange and blue to golden yellow and blue. At the same time, the rolling stock also changed its liveries with regards to the arrival of the new rolling stock from Indonesia. The 203 series-based passenger cars' liveries did not change as of 2022.

The first among the old rolling stock was the KiHa 350 and KiHa 59 series trains. After this was the Hyundai Rotem DMUs and finally, 900 series locomotives DEL 917, 902, 913, 921, and 922, 5000 series locomotive DEL 5007 and 5001, and 2500 series locomotive DEL 2540 changed its livery to orange. All multiple units were fitted with new window screen to resist stoning. The colors however varied from one type of rolling stock to another but the common theme was the inclusion of orange (as the highlight color), white (as the main stock color), navy blue (as the side line color) and black (as the bottom color).

=== CRRC diesel multiple unit livery (2021) ===
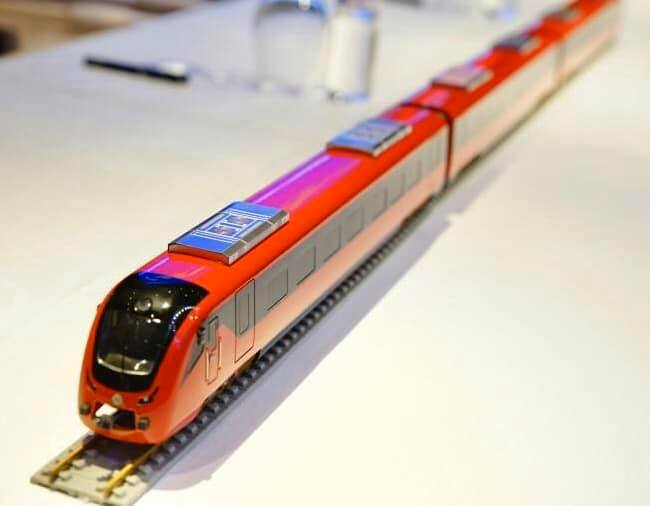
Scale model of the CRRC Zhuzhou DMU in 2019

The latest effort to the revitalization of the South Main Line, particularly the Bicol Express intercity service, was unveiled in 2019 dubbed the "South Long Haul" project. A scale model of the train that would have been used was revealed during a contract signing ceremony between the Philippine National Railways, its superior agency the Department of Transportation, and the Chinese rolling stock manufacturer CRRC Zhuzhou Locomotive. The three-car train will also feature a red-orange livery with black stripes on its windows. This train would have arrived in 2021.

However, on February 24, 2021, PNR cancelled the contract with CRRC Zhuzhou Locomotive due to the procurement process being questioned by the Commission on Audit, and the failure of CRRC Zhuzhou Locomotive to submit post-qualification bidding requirements.

=== NSCR electric multiple unit livery (2021) ===
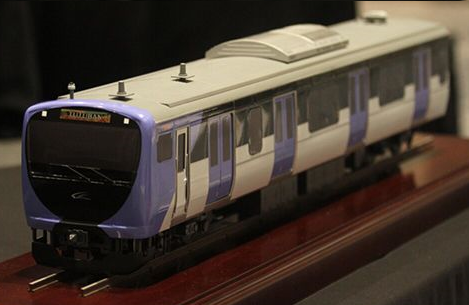
2019 scale model of the NSCR train, featuring a blue livery

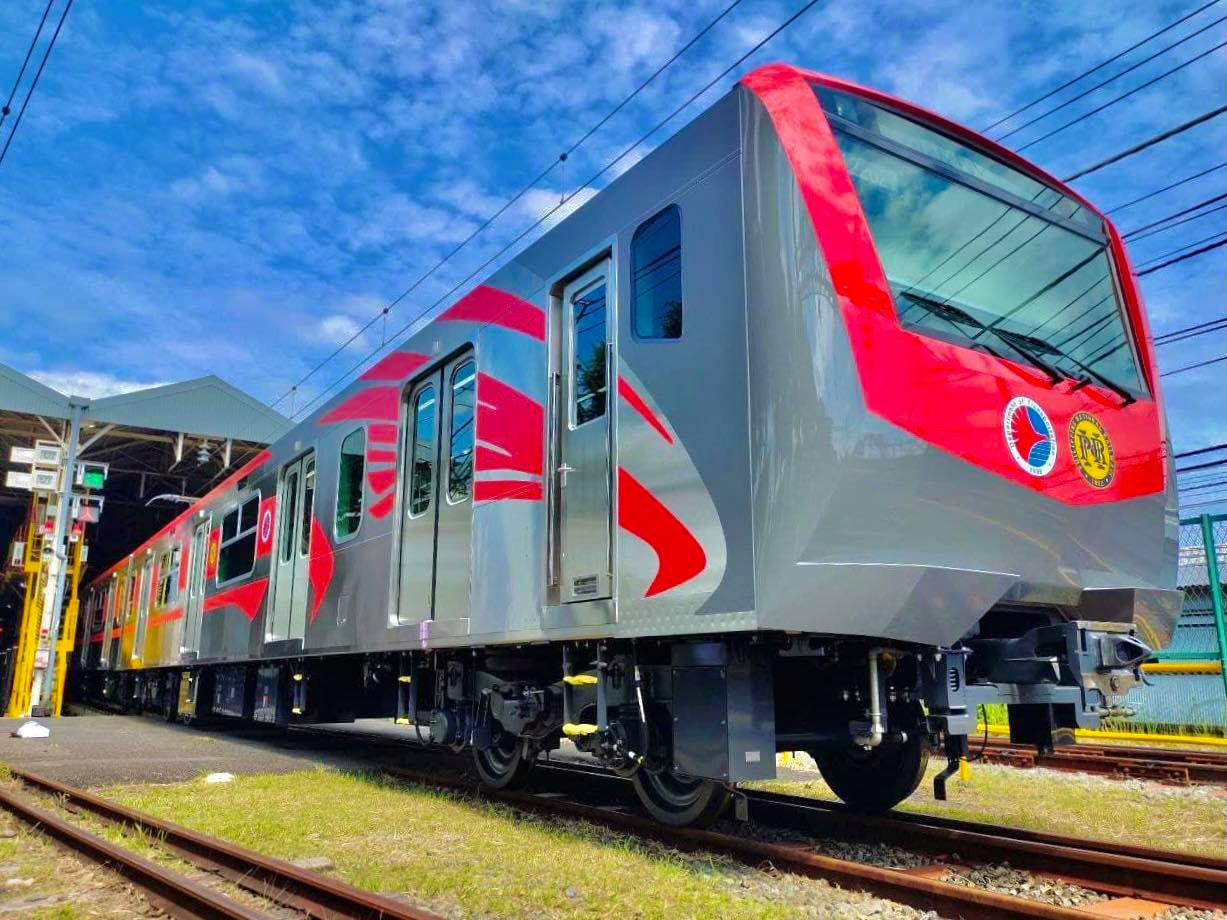
A PNR EM10000 class train with the revised red-orange livery in 2021

In line with the construction of the North–South Commuter Railway, the Department of Transportation ordered 104 train cars (13 sets) of electric multiple units from Sumitomo Corporation and Japan Transport Engineering Company on July 16, 2019. The original proposal featured a bluish-purple livery in the 2019 scale model of the Sustina Commuter.

However, the livery design was changed when PNR revealed a mock-up of the front cab for the PNR EM10000 class trains on June 29, 2021. The livery now features a red-orange color livery and eagle design highlights on the sides of the lead cars of the train.

== See also ==
- Department of Transportation
- List of Philippine National Railways stations
- Panay Railways
- Rail transportation in the Philippines
- Strong Republic Transit System
