= PNR North Main Line =

Rail service between the NCR and Central Luzon, Philippines

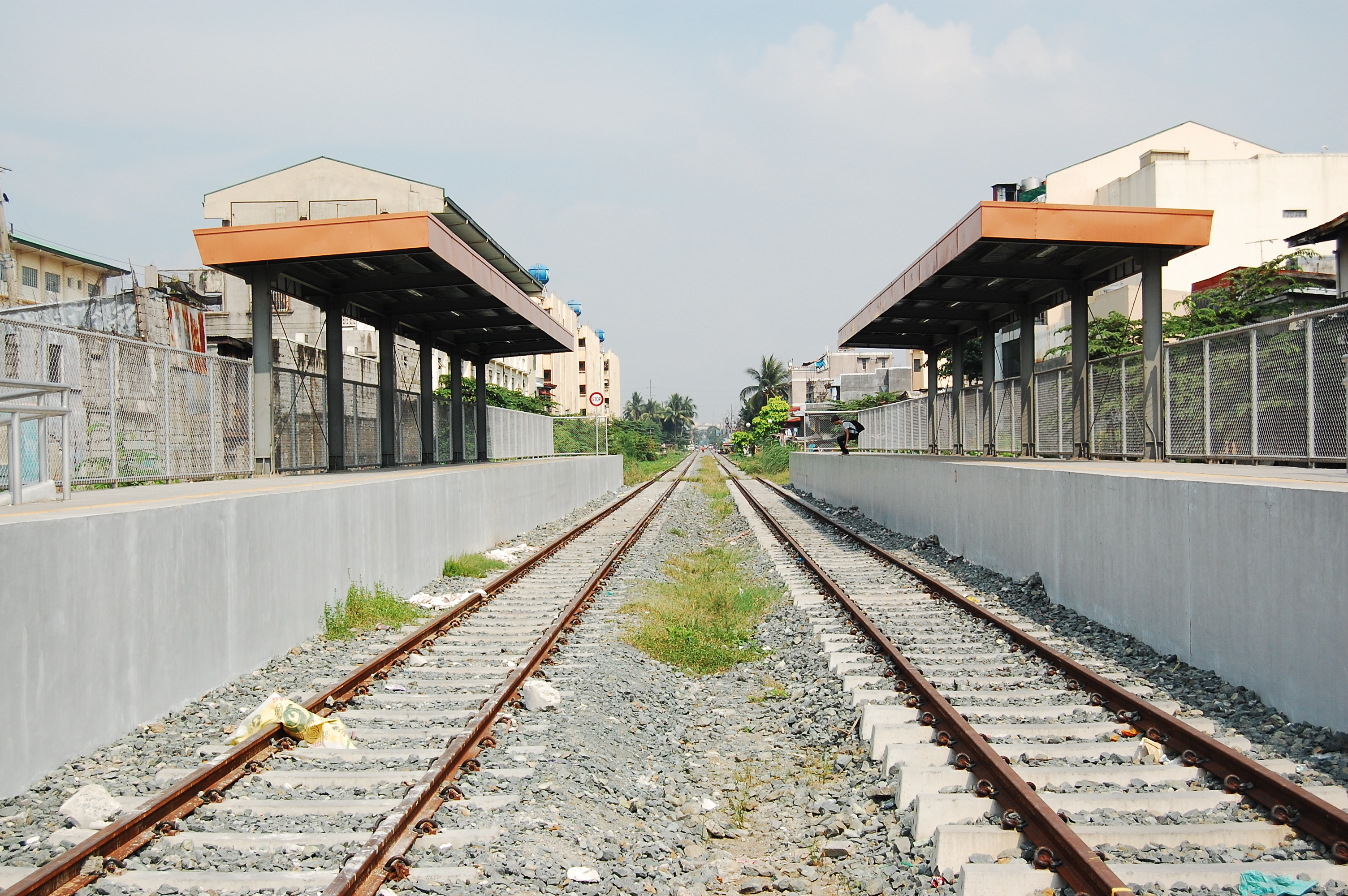
- Solis station in 2011

Overview
- Native name: Pangunahing Linyang Pahilaga ng PNR
- Status: Closed (Note: The line has since closed to give way for the construction of the North–South Commuter Railway.)
- Owner: Philippine National Railways
- Locale: Metro Manila; Central Luzon; Ilocos Region; Cordillera (until 1945)
- Termini: Tutuban; Governor Pascual
- Continues as: PNR South Main Line
- Stations: 6
- Website: www.pnr.gov.ph

Service
- Type: Commuter rail
- System: PNR Luzon
- Services: 2
- Depot: Caloocan
- Rolling stock: PNR Hyundai Rotem DMU; 8100 class DMUs

History
- Opened: November 24, 1892; 133 years ago
- Closed: 1997; 29 years ago
- Reopened: August 1, 2018; 7 years ago

Technical
- Line length: 6.4 km (4.0 mi)
- Track length: 12.8 km (8.0 mi)
- Number of tracks: Double-track; Single-track with sidings (former)
- Character: At-grade
- Track gauge: 1,067 mm (3 ft 6 in)
- Operating speed: 40 km/h (25 mph)

The PNR North Main Line (Filipino: Pangunahing Linyang Pahilaga ng PNR, simply known as PNR North or Northrail) is one of the two trunk lines of the Philippine National Railways in the island of Luzon, the other being the PNR South Main Line. The line during its maximum extent led to various cities and municipalities in Central Luzon and the Ilocos Region.

The project was originally proposed in 1875 during the Spanish era, and was constructed in stages between the 1880s and the 1890s as the Ferrocarril de Manila a Dagupan (lit. 'Manila–Dagupan Railroad'). The line was opened to Dagupan, Pangasinan on November 24, 1892. Further extensions to the line reached as far as Bacnotan, La Union with passenger trains terminating at San Fernando U station in the provincial capitol. It also briefly reached Sudipen near the provincial border with Ilocos Sur during World War II but was later dismantled in 1945.

Services peaked in the 1960s and the early 1970s until several factors such as fierce competition with the national highway system, increasing maintenance costs, natural disasters and the 1997 Asian financial crisis eventually led to the closure of the line in the late 1990s. The line only served as a connection for trains returning to the Caloocan depot. After 21 years of inactivity, services on the North Main Line resumed on August 1, 2018, with the reopening of Solis station in Tondo, Manila. More stations opened for the next few months with the latest being Governor Pascual on December 3 that year.

Like its counterpart to the south, the line is also slated to be rebuilt. The North–South Commuter Railway (NSCR) is being constructed in the area of Bulacan. Once completed, it will connect Tutuban station with Clark International Airport in Pampanga, and New Clark City in Tarlac. To its west of the line is the Subic–Clark railway which will initially be built for freight trains between the Subic Special Economic and Freeport Zone and Clark Airport with an extension to New Clark City. Other railroad lines that are separate from the NSCR are collectively referred as the PNR North Long Haul. Currently, this last project is still being proposed.

== History ==
The railroad network in Luzon, predecessor to today's Philippine National Railways, was first proposed on August 6, 1875. To the north of Manila are two main lines, one leading to Laoag, Ilocos Norte and the other leading to Tuguegarao, Cagayan. The system was approved by the Spanish East Indies government in 1880, but construction did not commence until 1887 due to the lack of a concession operator. Unlike the South Main Line which was built to its planned terminus in Legazpi, Albay, the North Main Line network never reached its intended termini in Laoag for the northwestern line and Tuguegarao for the northeastern line.

=== Spanish era ===
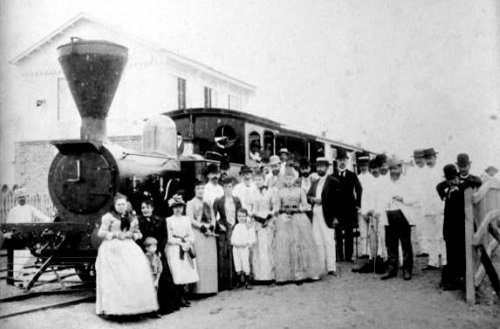
One of the early trains of the Ferrocarril de Manila a Dagupan, taken c. 1880s.

The Manila Railway Company, Limited was created on June 1, 1887, and construction began. Initial site inspection was presided by Lieutenant Colonel José Gago y Palomo (1849–1908), who was renowned for building fortifications and trails in Mindanao for Spanish Army General Valeriano Weyler. According to Gary Satre on an investigative article in 1999, the use of 3 feet, 6 inches gauge was made both as a cost-cutting measure and to allow tighter curves to suit the island's mountainous terrain. One of the main obstacles in the construction stage is crossing the Rio Grande de Pampanga, after which a box truss bridge was built.

At the same time, several tank locomotives were ordered by the Manila Railway. This began with an order for 2 Manila Railway Manila class locomotives in 1886 from English manufacturer Hunslet Engine Company. These were later named Manila and Dagupan after the line's two planned termini. Between 1888 and 1890, thirty Manila Railway Dagupan class locomotives were ordered from Neilson and Company and Dübs and Company. Various passenger railcars and boxcars were also ordered from unknown British manufacturers.

Prior to the opening of the full length of the line to Pangasinan, José Rizal was one of the most popular commuters of the early Ferrocarril de Manila a Dagupan. He used the line to recruit potential La Liga Filipina members prior to his exile. On February 23, 1892, he took a train to San Fernando station in Pampanga. He then commuted to various other locations in Central Luzon, until he took his last train with a 120 km (75 mi) trip to Tarlac on June 26. He wrote that the trip took 5 hours, 40 minutes. This was 2 weeks prior to his exile to Dapitan. On November 24, 1892, the line to Dagupan was inaugurated.

=== Revolutionary and American era ===
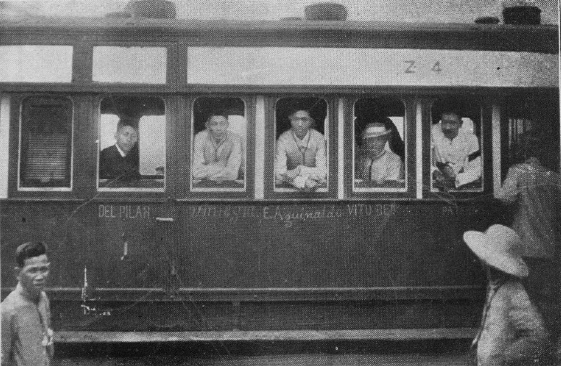
Aguinaldo's railcar c. 1898. The train was one of Aguinaldo's ways to retreat.

Manila Railway trains were used by both the Philippine Revolutionary Army and the United States Army forces during the Philippine–American War. President Emilio Aguinaldo and his cabinet ministers used First Class car Z4 as their primary method of travel on the railroad, especially during their retreat to northern Luzon. On the other hand, the advancing American forces used the Manila Railway to carry freight and Army soldiers. Trains were also used as mobile hospitals, carrying soldiers who were either injured or killed during the fighting. A river bridge in Bamban, Tarlac was destroyed along with one of the Dagupan class locomotives used by the US Army. This is to prevent the American advance to Central Luzon. However, the efforts to sabotage the network were futile as Filipino forces were eventually defeated and President Aguinaldo was captured in 1901.

After the war, the network was repaired and expanded. The British owners were still allowed to operate for the following years, having reorganized into the Manila Railway Company (1906) Limited. Meanwhile, an American operator named the Manila Railroad Company (MRR) Corporation was established in New Jersey that same year.

By 1909, the Manila Railroad took control of the system, although Horace L. Higgins still leads as its general manager in the country and the Annual Report was still prepared with British conventions. New lines were defined by Insular Government Act No. 1905 as the Northern Lines. This include the Manila–Dagupan main line, the Antipolo branch of the Southern Lines, the Cabanatuan branch, the Fort Stotsenburg branch, and shortline railroads serving the Port of Manila and within Dagupan.

The Baguio Special, the Philippines' first named express train service, was inaugurated in 1911. Originally only stopping at Damortis in Rosario, La Union with a luxury car service heading for the hill station of Baguio, this train started the scramble for a direct rail service. Construction for the Aringay–Baguio line started in 1914 but was never finished and the tunnel leading to the city was never completed, citing British involvement in World War I as the reason. This later made the Manila Railway's remaining Philippine unit to be absorbed into the Manila Railroad on January 8, 1917, with general manager Horace L. Higgins replaced by Colonel Henry Bayard McCoy.

Under McCoy's leadership, the Manila Railroad modernized its locomotive fleet with the purchase of several American-built tender locomotives over the next few years. Meanwhile, the American Car and Foundry provided both regular passenger and sleeping cars, starting with the new Baguio Night Special service. After his death in 1923, he was then succeeded by Jose Paez, the first Filipino general manager of the company. Paez continued the fleet modernization started by McCoy as well as expanded the network to its established termini at San Fernando, La Union on March 16, 1929, and a seamless network to the Bicol Region was opened on May 8, 1938.

=== World War II and Japanese occupation ===
Although the line was damaged after the First Philippines campaign during World War II, the Japanese briefly extended it to Sudipen near the La Union–Ilocos Sur border, some 41.6 kilometers (25.8 miles) north of San Fernando. After the Second Philippines campaign, the line has been closed. The line was eventually dismantled so that track materials would give way for the reconstruction of the Main Line South's network. Additionally, the Aringay–Tuba section of the Baguio line was closed and the 300 class rack tank locomotives used for this service were scrapped in 1945. However, the tracks remained by as late as the 1960s and were built over by paddy fields.

=== Post-war era ===
Only over a third of the Manila Railroad system was usable after the war, amounting to 452 km (281 mi). Around eighty percent of its rolling stock were also destroyed. The system was eventually rebuilt, but not all branch lines were restored.

In 1951, Ramon Magsaysay was appointed as general manager of the Manila Railroad. Under Magsaysay's term as general manager despite being only three months, made the company extend its network to Bacnotan. He would also preside the beginning of the Cagayan Valley extension. Magsaysay later became the President of the Philippines in 1953 and under his term, the Manila Railroad underwent another fleet modernization. Its entire steam locomotive fleet will be replaced by diesel locomotives starting in 1954. In August 1956, the modernization has been completed and all steam locomotives were relegated to maintenance work or retired altogether. Yards along the North Main Line in Pampanga became the storage location of these locomotives until they were all scrapped in the 1960s and onwards.

=== PNR era ===
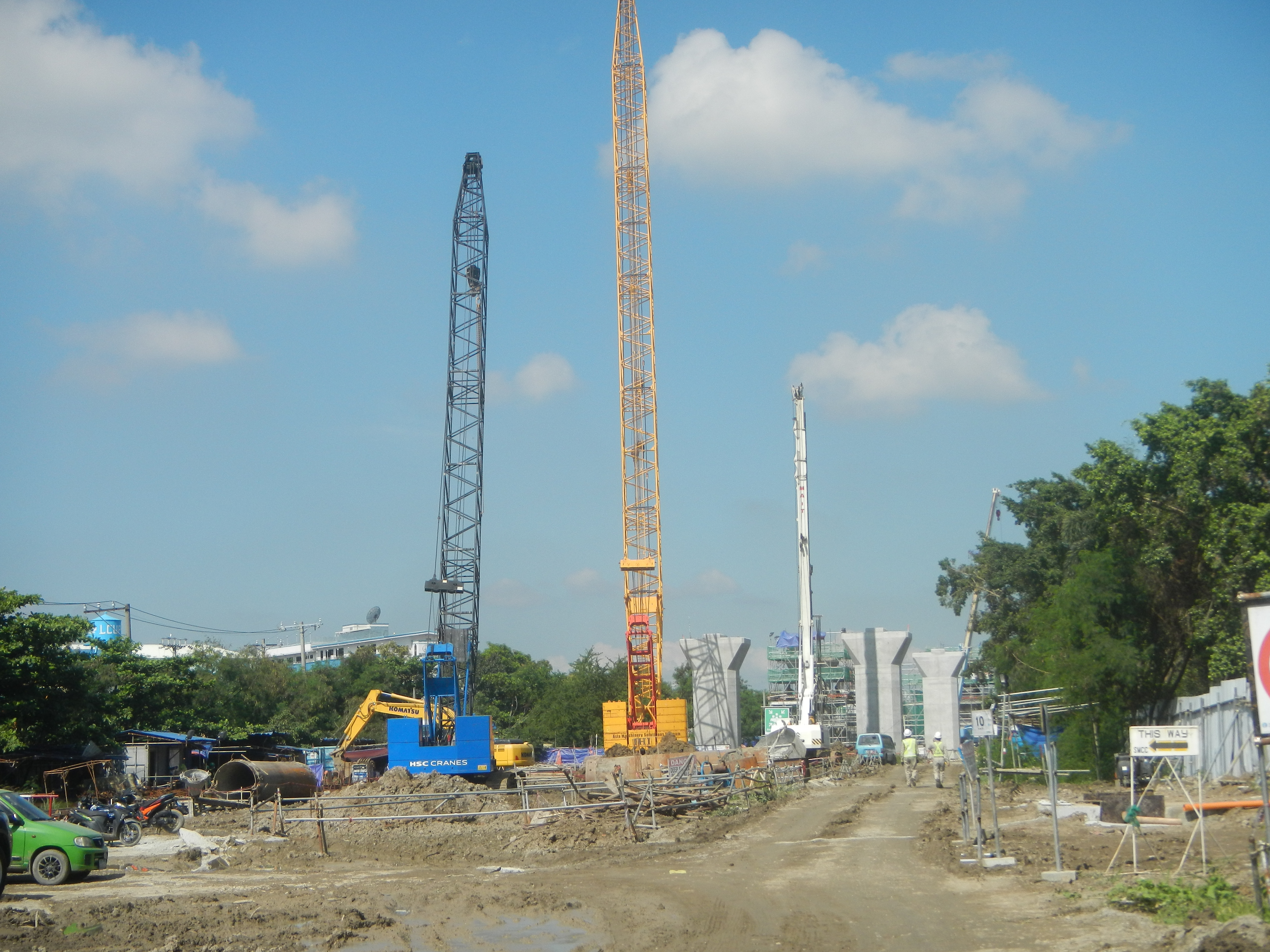
Construction on the North–South Commuter Railway in Malolos, Bulacan. Originally proposed in 1978, the project's previous forms were repeatedly constructed and abandoned by as late as 2011.

By 1964, the Manila Railroad was reorganized and renamed into the present Philippine National Railways. The renaming took inspiration from the Japanese National Railways. The early days of the PNR was also claimed to be the agency's golden years. While operations were smaller in scale to its southern counterpart, the North Main Line was still a popular means of travel leading out of Metro Manila. The line sought an estimated daily ridership of 3,000 passengers.

==== Decline and closure ====
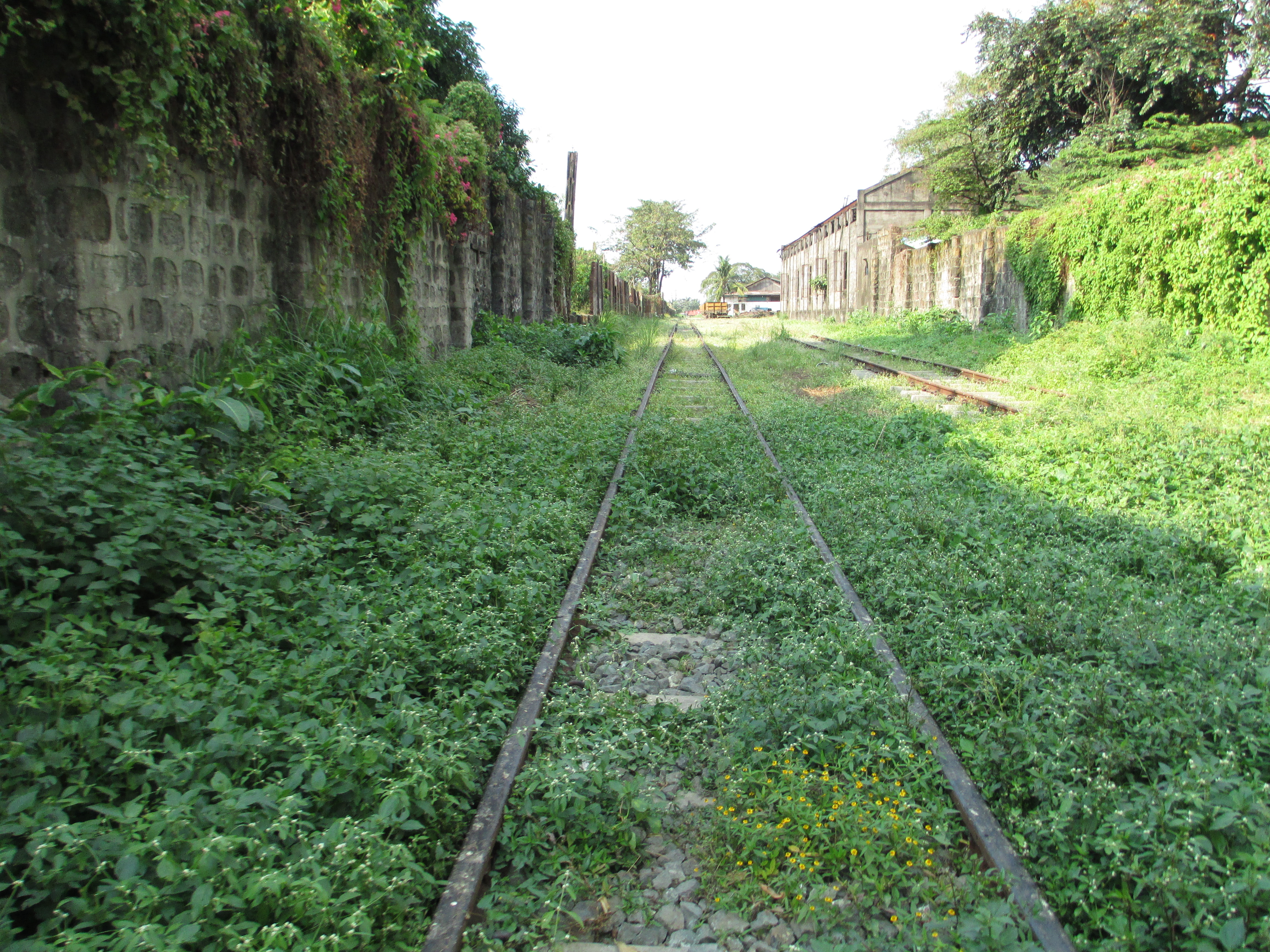
Abandoned Northrail rail tracks along Caloocan in January 2014

The 1970s were the beginning of the decline of operations on the North Main Line. The Cagayan Valley extension was never fully realized and PNR trains only terminated at San Jose, Nueva Ecija. The tunnel boring machines were then sold-off as debt payment for the project, and track work has been reverted into roads. A later investigation found that the Marcos government transferred the funds to the construction of the Maharlika Highway. The 1980s started the closure of the line due to decreasing ridership. A bridge collapse in 1984 ordered the closure of the services to the Ilocos Region. The line was then reduced to Caloocan in 1988, leaving the South Main Line the only operational intercity line at that point. There was a brief return of a commuter rail service to Malolos as part of the Metrotren program between 1990 and 1997.

Since then, the Ramos administration took advantage of the recently closed North Main Line to revitalize plans to electrify the commuter rail service in Metro Manila. The project was originally proposed by the Japan International Cooperation Agency in 1978. This was named as the Manila–Clark rapid railway project with the assistance of Spain. Construction continued as the Northrail project during the presidency of Gloria Macapagal Arroyo, but stopped during the presidency of Benigno Aquino III due to disagreements with its Chinese backers. The project was never completed and ended like the failed Hopewell Project of Bangkok, Thailand. It was not until the 2010s when the present form was realized as the North–South Commuter Railway.

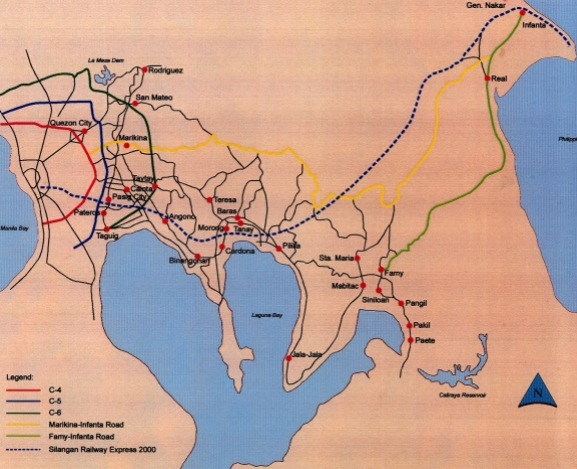
The Silangan Railway Express 2000 project would have connected northern Quezon with Metro Manila.

Another railway project was also proposed during the late 1990s as part of the Philippines 2000 program under President Ramos. In 1995, the Manila–Rizal–Laguna–Quezon Growth Corridor (MARILAQUE) was proposed and the MARILAQUE Commission was established for the development of the area. They were tasked by the national government to implement the Silangan Railway Express 2000 project. The 95 km (59 mi) line would have connected the northern half of Metro Manila to Rizal similar to the pre-war Antipolo and Marikina lines. It would then be extended eastward towards eastern Rizal province and northern Quezon, both more rural than the areas once plied by the two aforementioned lines. While plans continued under the term of President Joseph Estrada with the Japan International Cooperation Agency (JICA) by as late as 1999, it never materialized and was not considered to be built by future administrations.

==== Reopening and contemporary history ====
There were no services on the North Main Line during much of the 2000s, although the line was still used for trains heading to PNR's maintenance facility in Caloocan. Trial service on the North Main Line were planned later on. Between 2009 and 2010, PNR stations were renovated including a number of stations on the North Main Line. Some second-hand 12 series coaches were also acquired from the East Japan Railway Company as the NR class. These coaches were later reassigned to the South Main Line. Despite these initial plans not continuing as planned, the line was eventually reactivated. A Shuttle Service was opened from 10th Avenue station in Caloocan to Dela Rosa station in Makati on August 1, 2018. Since then, a regular Metro North Commuter service has been opened and the Shuttle Service was expanded to Bicutan station in Parañaque. Since 2020, the newly purchased PNR 8000 class diesel multiple units were then assigned to the line and replaced second-hand KiHa 350s and KiHa 52s DMUs.

== Station list ==
The North Main Line currently only has stations within northern Metro Manila, though it previously had stations in Bulacan, Pampanga, Tarlac, Pangasinan and La Union. Branch lines also led to Nueva Ecija, while tracks and track bed were already placed in Isabela and Cagayan prior to the Cagayan Valley extension project's cancellation in the 1970s.

== Services ==
Only two commuter rail services run on the North Main Line, both of which only operate within Metro Manila. This is unlike its counterpart to the south that would have some trains lead to neighboring Laguna province during rush hour.

=== Active ===
There are only two services that run on the North Main Line as of 2019:

- The Metro North Commuter service runs between Tutuban station in Manila and Governor Pascual station in Malabon. This service does not pass through any stations on the South Main Line due to the wye junction in Tondo, Manila.
- The Shuttle Service runs between Governor Pascual and Bicutan, Parañaque on the South Main Line. Unlike the Metro North Commuter, it skips Tutuban via the Tondo wye and would go towards the direction of Blumentritt for southbound trains or Solis for northbound trains.

=== Defunct ===
The North Main Line hosted both intercity and commuter trains like its southern counterpart. While its intercity services have been discontinued since 1988 and much of the right of way has been converted to roads, its commuter service was reconstructed and reopened in 2018. However, not all of its historic commuter operations are in active service and these are set to be replaced within the 2020s either by rapid transit or the NSCR.

==== Commuter rail ====
There were several commuter rail services leading in and out of Manila on the North Main Line during its history. Some of the lines were eventually closed, and their reconstruction were later deemed unnecessary to restore because of existing rapid transit infrastructure from other systems.

- The first known commuter rail branch on the North Main Line was the Antipolo line. Inaugurated in 1908, it connected Antipolo, Manila province to downtown Manila via Santa Mesa. Services on this line were hauled by specialized tank locomotives due to its steep gradients such as the Manila Railroad 160 class Kitson–Meyer locomotives. This was however closed in 1917 after a Supreme Court of the Philippines ruling that ordered the closure of the line. The return of train services to Rizal were proposed later on, the latest being the LRT Line 2 eastward extension to Antipolo (Masinag). The extension opened on July 5, 2021, replacing the old Antipolo line.
  - The Marikina branch was finished earlier than the Antipolo line in 1906 to Marikina, but was closed much later. The line branched off the Antipolo line in Marikina and led to Montalban. After the Antipolo line was closed in 1917, the line was closed in 1936 at the same time with the Naic line to Cavite. The section up to Marikina is also set to be replaced by the LRT Line 2 eastward extension.
  - The Guadalupe line was the 13 km (8.1 mi) reconstruction of the old Antipolo line in the 1970s from Santa Mesa, Manila to Mandaluyong. It terminated at Guadalupe station, but it was located on the other side of the Pasig River as its namesake district in Makati. The line was closed in 1983 after only 9 years of operations, and the rail bridge that carried the line was destroyed in 1991. The area in which the Guadalupe line operated has now been covered by the LRT Line 2 and the MRT Line 3.
- There was also a once-a-day service between Tutuban and San Fernando. It was opened on January 21, 1968. The service took around 2 hours in 1976, in which it was extended to Angeles. The service was closed in 1988 with the closure of the entire North Main Line outside of Metro Manila. This service in particular shall be superseded by the NSCR North, which will extend services further to New Clark City in Capas, Tarlac.
- The last commuter service on the line out of Metro Manila was the Metrotren Tutuban–Malolos service. Inaugurated not long after the closure of the commuter service to Pampanga in 1990, the service led to Malolos, Bulacan. However, it was short-lived and was closed amidst the 1997 Asian financial crisis. This service shall also be superseded by the NSCR North with Malolos as the terminus of Phase 1.

==== Intercity rail ====
The North Main Line was first opened when the Manila–Dagupan Railway was opened in 1892. At its height between the 1950s and 1960s, the line went from Tutuban to Dagupan and also served until San Fernando, La Union. The line also boasted several rail yards. It also had branch lines to various areas in Central Luzon. However, its services severely deteriorated in the 1980s. All regular operations outside Metro Manila first ended in 1988, and the line was closed in 1997.

===== Amianan Express =====
The Amianan Express was a night train service that opened in 1974. It left Manila by 11 pm and arrived in San Fernando by 4:30 am the next day. It was serviced by then-new PNR 900 class diesel-electric locomotives and five coaches capable of seating 912 people. After ending in San Fernando station, commuters would take the bus to Ilocos Norte and Sur, and Benguet. Later, it was expanded into two services, the Amianan Day Express and the Amianan Night Express. The Amianan Night Express ran faster than its day counterpart, the Amianan Day Express, making the 260 km (160 mi) run to San Fernando, La Union in five hours.

===== Baguio train-road services =====
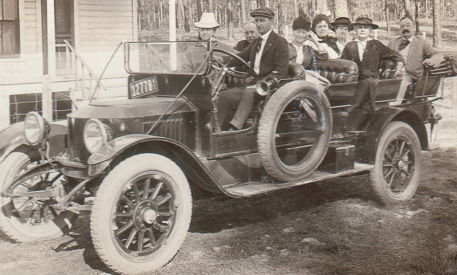
1912 Stanley Motor Carriage Model 88 Mountain Wagon similar to the Benguet Auto Line vehicles traveling Kennon Road in the early 20th century.

The difficulty of terrain to build new train lines prevented both MRR and PNR to have direct train services to Baguio City, then a small hill station in the Cordillera Region. There were already plans for a rail line to the town, but was ultimately cancelled in 1917 due to lack of funding.

- The first train service was the Baguio Special (Spanish: Manila a Baguio Especial, lit. 'Manila–Baguio Special'). It was inaugurated in 1911 and was the country's first flagship service. The train initially stopped in Pangasinan until the line was later extended to Damortis station in Santo Tomas, La Union. From here, limousines would take travelers to Baguio. This service was extremely popular that Damortis went through an overhaul in 1938 to support the demand of travelers.
  - In 1922, a night service was added. At least one car was ordered from the American Car and Foundry Company to serve the Baguio Night Special. Both services ended in 1941.
- A second service was inaugurated by the MRR by around 1955. Passengers would ride the train from Tutuban to Damortis station in Santo Tomas, La Union, then will ride a limousine service of Chevrolet Bel Airs to Pines Hotel in Baguio. It costed ₱45 (equivalent to $217 in 2020 US Dollars) for this package.
- The third and last service was opened during the PNR era with a bus service leading to Baguio, with buses provided by Hino Motors. This service operated until all provincial services on the North Main Line were suspended by late 1984, when all trains to the Ilocos Region were suspended.

===== Dagupan Express =====
The Dagupan Express opened on February 10, 1979. It was serviced by the MCBP class diesel multiple units, the intercity version of the MC-300 multiple units of 1968. Like the Amianan Express, the Dagupan Express also ended in 1984 after all North Main Line services terminated in Tarlac.

===== Ilocos Express =====
The Ilocos Express was inaugurated on March 15, 1930. The services includes a dining car with catering provided by the Manila Hotel. Another variant of the service was the Baguio-Ilocos Express. Following the modernization program of the Manila Railway Company in 1955, the Ilocos Express featured a 7A class "De Luxe" coach until 1979, when the lack of operable air-conditioned coaches caused a switch to a "Tourist"-class coach. The company also operated the Paniqui Express in the 1930s, but that was eclipsed by the Ilocos Express. There were two accidents involving the service, one in 1939 and another in 1959.

It was also known as the Ilocos Special on Spanish language promotional material. Such services were intended to connect Tutuban and Manila within 6 hours using newly-refurbished locomotives that burn fuel oil instead of coal.

== Rolling stock ==
Due to the North Main Line only running a few kilometers north to Malabon, the line runs relatively few trains. The line currently uses PNR Hyundai Rotem DMUs, 203 series and PNR 8000 class trainsets. Ex-JNR rolling stock such as KiHa 35 and KiHa 52 have been out of service for the line.

== Reconstruction ==
PNR North Luzon Railways Program

Overview
- Status: Under construction (NSCR)
- Owner: Philippine National Railways
- Locale: Metro Manila; Central Luzon
- Termini: Tutuban; New Clark City (Note: Subic–Clark Railway would ends at the Port of Subic, North Long Haul would ends either at San Fernando, La Union or Tuguegarao.)
- Stations: 20 (NSCR)

Service
- Type: Urban rail transit (S-train); Inter-city rail
- System: PNR Luzon
- Services: 5
- Operator: Philippine National Railways
- Daily ridership: 490,000 (Note: NSCR North only, deducted the total daily ridership of 830,000 with NSCR South's ridership of 340,000.)

History
- Opened: 2028 (partial operations of the NSCR)

Technical
- Line length: 721 km (448 mi) (Note: 91 km (57 mi) for the NSCR North, 92 km (57 mi) for the Northeast Commuter Line, 71 km (44 mi) for the Subic–Clark Railway and 467 km (290 mi) for the North Long Haul.)
- Track length: At least 812 km (505 mi)
- Number of tracks: Double-track (NSCR); Single-track (SCRP)
- Character: Grade-separated
- Track gauge: 1,435 mm (4 ft 8 1/2 in) standard gauge
- Electrification: 1,500 V DC OHLE
- Operating speed: 160 km/h (99 mph)

The Build! Build! Build! Infrastructure Program provided an overview of the planned system in northern and central Luzon. All new lines are standard-gauge railways.

=== NSCR North ===
The North section of the North–South Commuter Railway, also known as NSCR North and PNR Clark, is a 91 km (57 mi) section that shall rebuild the historic commuter services to Malolos in Bulacan, as well as San Fernando and Angeles City in Pampanga before terminating at Clark International Airport. The line shall also be extended to New Clark City, with a targeted opening date between 2023 and 2025.

Development started after the old Northrail project was cancelled when the Department of Transportation and Communications attempted to reactivate the construction of a new electrified commuter rail line. Canadian firm CPCS Transcom was commissioned to conduct a feasibility study for a Malolos–Los Baños commuter line as part of a larger effort to reform Metro Manila's public transport system. This was eventually approved as the North–South Railway Project (NSRP) in 2014. In August 2015, the track gauge for the NSRP was changed from standard gauge to 1,067 mm (3 ft 6 in) narrow gauge so there will be no need of an overhaul of the existing network. This was later reverted to standard gauge after the North–South Commuter Railway in its present form was announced on June 1, 2018.

==== Construction ====
Pre-construction work such as clearing of the right of way was started on January 6, 2018. The groundbreaking and construction from Tutuban to Malolos started on February 15, 2019. The contract for the construction of NSCR North 1 was awarded to the Filipino-Japanese consortium of DMCI Holdings and Taisei Corporation on May 21, 2019. The contract for the construction of the railway viaduct from Tutuban to Bocaue was awarded in December 2020 to Swiss firm VSL International, a subsidiary of French conglomerate Bouygues. NSCR North 2 was then awarded starting in August 2020 to various consortiums of local and international companies.

On April 12, 2021, clearing works began for the new Calumpit station in Barangay Iba Oeste (West), Calumpit, Bulacan. The three-floor building will be the first station to be constructed for the NSCR North Phase 2. Prior to May, construction work for Apalit station commenced. As of May 1, concrete pouring has been completed on some of the piers while geotechnical engineering work are still ongoing.

==== Electric stock ====
The NSCR will be the PNR's first electrified mainline. With this move to electrification, the DOTr has allotted a total of 360 electric multiple units for this service. The first batch of 104 Sustina Commuter EMUs commuter trains were already ordered from the Japan Transport Engineering Company. Another batch of 200 commuter EMUs and 56 airport express trains are also being procured.

=== Northeast Commuter Line ===
PNR requested a feasibility study for the reconstruction of the old Cabanatuan branch line in January 2019. Once approved, this will become the Northeast Commuter Line. It will start on NSCR tracks in Makati and will branch off the main line at Balagtas station in Bulacan. The line proper will continue for at least 92 km (57 mi) northeast towards Nueva Ecija, ending at the city of Cabanatuan. There are also plans for an extension to San Jose, Nueva Ecija, sealing a loop with the NSCR northward extension there.

The Environmental Protection Division (Enro) of Cabanatuan held a stakeholders' consultation meeting on July 29, 2020. This also announced that the line has 17 stations with the extension to San Jose. At Guiguinto, the line will take a new right-of-way compared to the old Cabanatuan line. At San Rafael, Bulacan, the Northeast Commuter will then follow the old route to Cabanatuan. Another new route will be built towards San Jose. This will join with the Tarlac–San Jose extension of the NSCR (NSCR North 4) towards North Long Haul East, which will then terminate at Tuguegarao.

PNR general manager Junn Magno stated on an interview with local TV show Motoring Today on February 7, 2021, that the agency is still developing proposals for the line. Once completed, it will shorten travel times between job centers in Metro Manila and commuter towns in eastern Bulacan within 55 to 60 minutes.

=== Freight railroads ===
- The Subic–Clark-Manila-Batangas Railway (SCMBRP), via the Subic-Clark Railway (SCR) is a line to be constructed between the Subic Special Economic and Freeport Zone and Clark International Airport. The 71 km (44 mi) railroad shall be built initially with a single track and to be operated with diesel locomotives, accommodating solely for freight trains between the two freeport zones (with no plans for passenger services). The maximum speed for the initial line is 80 km/h (50 mph). The current right-of-way already has an allowance for upgrade to double-track and an electrified system. Under these upgrades shall passenger services be included, with a maximum speed of 160 km/h (99 mph). Once successful, this project shall pave the way for the construction of the PNR North Long Haul. There are plans as well to link this to the PNR South Main Line.
- The North Philippine Dry Port Container Rail Transport Service, or simply the North Dry Port is a proposed 27 km (17 mi) single-track freight line connecting the Manila North Harbor with the upcoming Balagtas Dry Port in Balagtas, Bulacan. This will reconstruct the present North Main Line infrastructure as well as the branch line leading to the North Harbor that was already dismantled. There are also plans to connect it with the Subic–Clark Railway for an estimated total length of 86 km (53 mi). As of February 2021, the project is still in the proposal stage with its feasibility study still being made. The track gauge for this system is yet to be determined, although a maximum speed of 80 km/h (50 mph) was selected for the line.

Both rail lines shall be interconnected to the North Long Haul via the Subic–Clark Railway, and to the South Long Haul via the overhaul of the existing tracks of the PNR Metro Commuter Line.

==== Freight stock ====
The diesel-electric locomotive to be used for the service is yet to be determined. It is expected that there will be four- and six-axle designs capable of at least 80 km/h (50 mph) operational speed. Meanwhile, the freight cars are classified into two categories: containerized and non-containerized. The average train lengths are between 250–350 meters (820–1,150 ft) for the initial phase while 650 meters (2,130 ft) will be the trains' maximum allowable length per the design of the line.

In 2016, promotional images use the China Railways HXN5 as a sample rolling stock for the line.

=== North Long Haul ===
The North Long Haul project shall revive the intercity section of the North Main Line north of New Clark City station in Capas. It shall also expand into regions that were not served by railways. The line is set to be connected to the South Main Line through the NSCR, the SCRP and the North Dry Port projects.

A majority of the project's main lines have been proposed since 1875, long before intercity services were opened in 1892. The Cagayan Valley Extension, predecessor to the North Long Haul East, initially had some of its right of way built in the 1950s and 1960s. However, construction was cancelled after 1966 and the equipment used was later sold. Contemporary efforts to reviving the North Main Line were first announced in 2017 during a DOTr's presentation to the South Korean Ministry of Foreign Affairs. It is expected that the system will be electrified with 1.5 kV DC electrification, being future extensions of the NSCR North and the SCRP. The upgrades shall happen once enough traffic has been reached to justify their implementation.

The system consists of two lines:

- The North Long Haul West is a reconstruction of the old North Main Line between New Clark City and La Union, with extensions to Laoag, the supposed final terminus of the Manila-Dagupan Railway. The line was expected to be around 159 km (99 mi) long, shortened from the former length of 175 km (109 mi) due to changes in design. In 2023, the line's length was extended up to Laoag, Ilocos Norte, adding a further 183 km (114 mi) from its initial terminus at San Fernando, La Union, bringing the total length to 419 km (260 mi).
- The North Long Haul East aims to revive the failed Cagayan Valley Extension project that was cancelled in the late 1960s. Branching off the old main line at Tarlac City, the line will continue towards the direction of San Jose, Nueva Ecija from which the 10 km (6.2 mi) Caraballo Tunnel will be built. After the tunnel, the line continues northward to Isabela and Cagayan until it terminates at Tuguegarao. The line is expected to be around 434 km (270 mi) long.
