= Governor Pascual station =

Train station in Malabon, Philippines

Governor Pascual
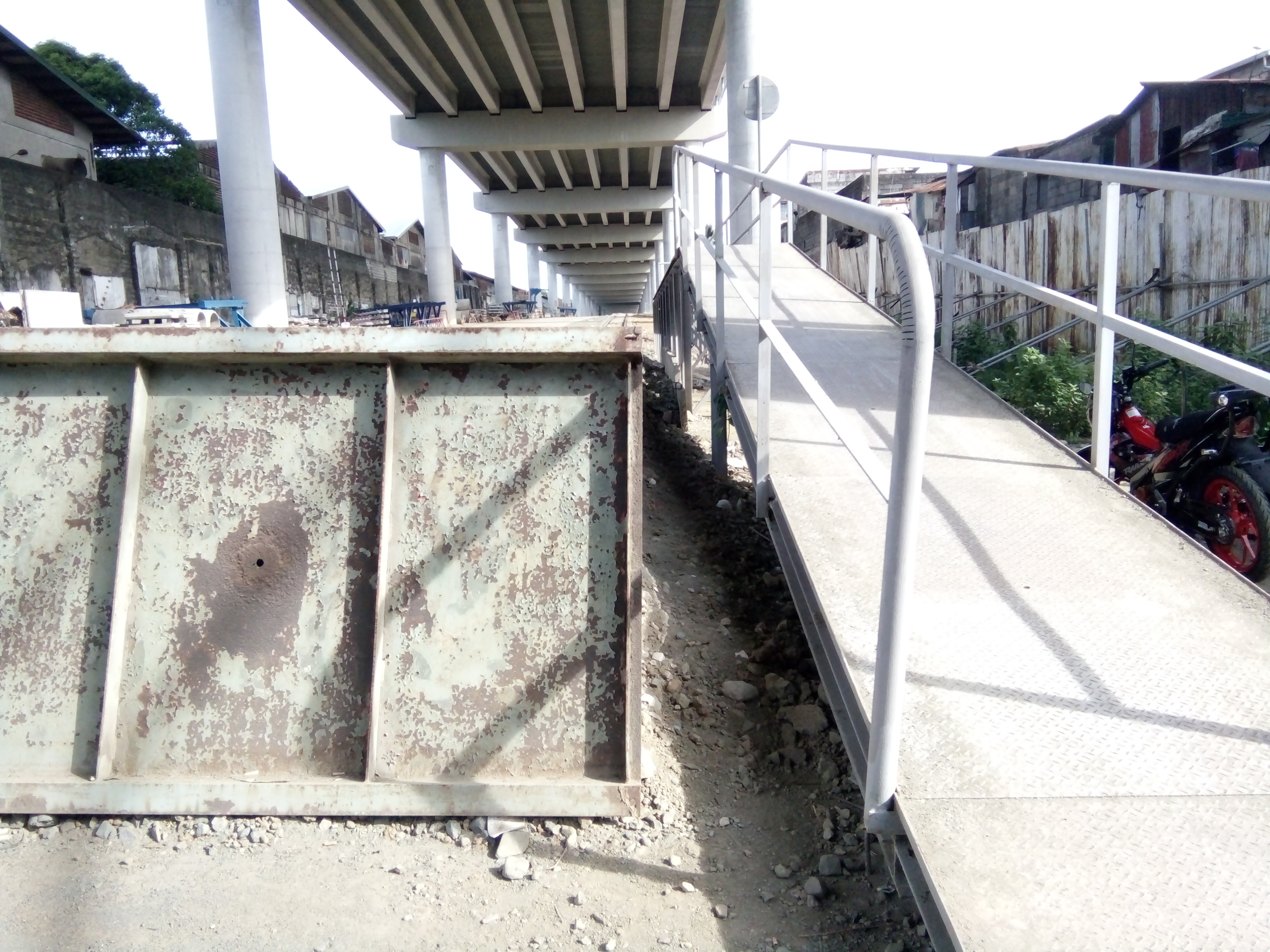
- Governor Pascual station temporary steel platform.

General information
- Other names: Malabon, Acacia
- Location: Governor Pascual Avenue, Acacia; Malabon, Metro Manila; Philippines
- Coordinates: 14°40′12.1″N 120°58′22.2″E
- Owner: Philippine National Railways
- Operator: Philippine National Railways
- Lines: North Main Line; Planned: North Commuter
- Platforms: Side platform
- Tracks: 1

Other information
- Status: Closed
- Station code: GP

History
- Opened: 1970s (original); December 3, 2018
- Closed: March 28, 2024
- Rebuilt: 2018 (partly)

Services
Preceding station	PNR	Following station
Terminus	North Shuttle	Caloocan towards Bicutan
Terminus	Metro North Commuter	Caloocan towards Tutuban
Future services
Preceding station	PNR	Following station
Valenzuela Polo towards Clark International Airport	NSCR Commuter CIA–Calamba	Caloocan towards Calamba
Valenzuela Polo towards New Clark City	NSCR Commuter NCC–Tutuban	Caloocan towards Tutuban
Location
- Location within Metro Manila Location within Luzon Location within Philippines

Governor Pascual station (also called Malabon station or Acacia station) is the current railway terminus of the North Main Line located in Malabon, Metro Manila, Philippines.

== History ==
Historically, the station is named after the adjacent Acacia village, where the old station once stood. Presently, it is named after the road, which is, in turn, named after Wenceslao Pascual, who served as the administrator of Malabon and governor of Rizal, when the then-municipality was part of the province.

The old station was demolished during clearing operations in 2007 for the ill-fated and renegotiated Northrail. The area was originally an embankment that would transition into the elevated guideways. The rails that cover the radius of this station was dismantled and replaced with standard gauge tracks. However, this embankment was demolished when the NLEX Segment 10.1 was built, and its newly-laid rails dismantled.

In 2018, after consultations with the Malabon LGU, DOTr and PNR intended to restore the at-grade railway station here, despite no longer being a designated stop in the elevated Northrail system initially. It is the most recent expansion of the Caloocan-FTI line beyond Caloocan, and the first time in 2 decades that there has been rail activity.

In September 2018, PNR engineers commenced the exploration of the site of the old Acacia railway station, and drafted plans to rebuild the dismantled rail lines there and set a target to reopen the service and station before the end of 2018. A ceremony was held to officially mark the commencement of the restoration of services. Construction materials related to the NLEX Segment were moved to make way for the restoration of the at-grade rails. Soon after, tracks were laid down along with ballasts. It required the restoration of Samson Road level crossing, which was done on November 23, 2018, which enables the PNR to serve Malabon once again. Services to Governor Pascual resumed on December 3, 2018, after two decades of hiatus.

The level crossing along Governor Pascual Road is pending restoration, as it was dismantled too during the clearing operations and eventual road reblocking, aimed for a planned extension to Valenzuela City.

With the closure of the PNR Metro Commuter Line, the reopened station is once again closed. The North-South Commuter Railway will have a station built nearby in the future.

== Nearby landmarks ==
Governor Pascual is lined with stores and establishments. Further to the west is Robinsons Town Mall Malabon, heading to Navotas, while to the east, Malabon City Zoo is located, leading back to Monumento in Caloocan.
