= Meycauayan station =

Part of the North-South Commuter Railway train network

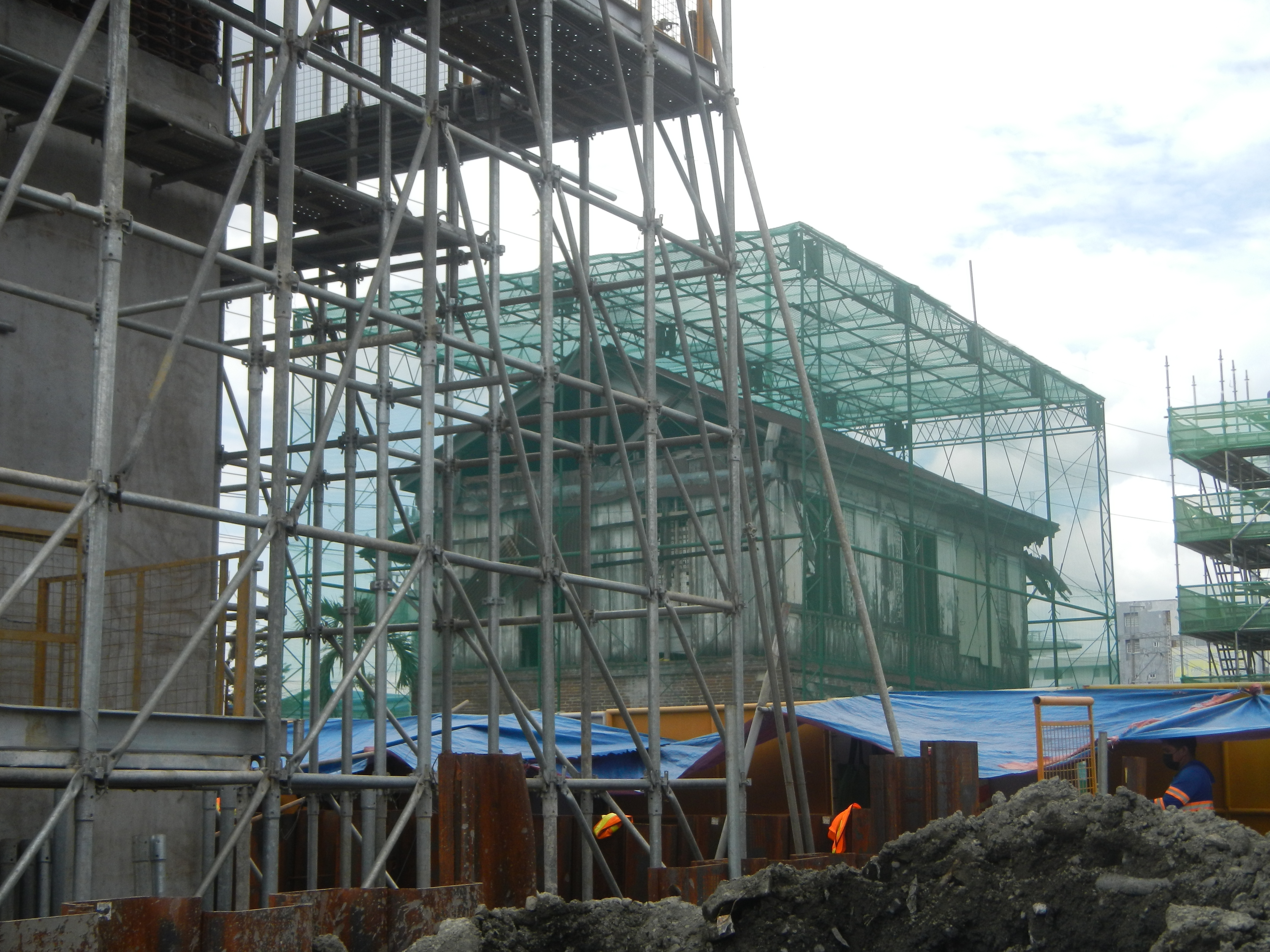
- The historical station in 2021.

General information
- Location: Malhacan; Meycauayan, Bulacan; Philippines
- Coordinates: 14°44′19″N 120°57′38″E
- Owner: Philippine National Railways
- Operator: Philippine National Railways
- Lines: Planned: North Commuter; Former: North Main Line
- Tracks: 2

Construction
- Structure type: Elevated
- Architectural style: Bahay na bato (old station); Contemporary (NSCR station)

Other information
- Status: Under construction
- Station code: MY

History
- Opened: March 24, 1891
- Former names: Meycawayan
Future services
Preceding station	PNR	Following station
Marilao towards Clark International Airport	NSCR Commuter CIA–Calamba	Valenzuela towards Calamba
Marilao towards New Clark City	NSCR Commuter NCC–Tutuban	Valenzuela towards Tutuban
Location
- Location within Bulacan Location within Luzon Location within Philippines

Meycauayan station is an under-construction elevated North–South Commuter Railway (NSCR) station located in Meycauayan, Bulacan, Philippines. The station was part of the Philippine National Railways (PNR) North Main Line before its closure in the 1980s.

== History ==
This station has been used for passenger and freight transportation by the Philippine National Railways (PNR) and its precursors in the past.

The station was first closed in 1988, but was reopened in the 1990 under the Metrotren project. During the 1991 eruption of Mount Pinatubo, the Meycauayan Railroad Bridge was destroyed and the station became the terminus, until services were altogether abandoned. It was abandoned when the North Main Line ceased operations in 1997. The old station house still stands but is in a state of deterioration and constantly guarded due to informal settlers.

The station was to be rebuilt as a part of the Northrail project, which involved the upgrading of the existing single track to an elevated dual-track system, converting the rail gauge from narrow gauge to standard gauge, and linking Manila to Malolos in Bulacan and further on to Angeles City, Clark Special Economic Zone and Clark International Airport. The project commenced in 2007; the station is in the middle of a clearing where railtracks once were laid. The railway's construction was repeatedly halted then discontinued in 2011, after allegations of overpricing.

It is currently being rebuilt as part of the first phase of the North–South Commuter Railway. The old station will also be preserved. Partial operations are slated to begin by 2027.

== Gallery ==
Meycauayan station
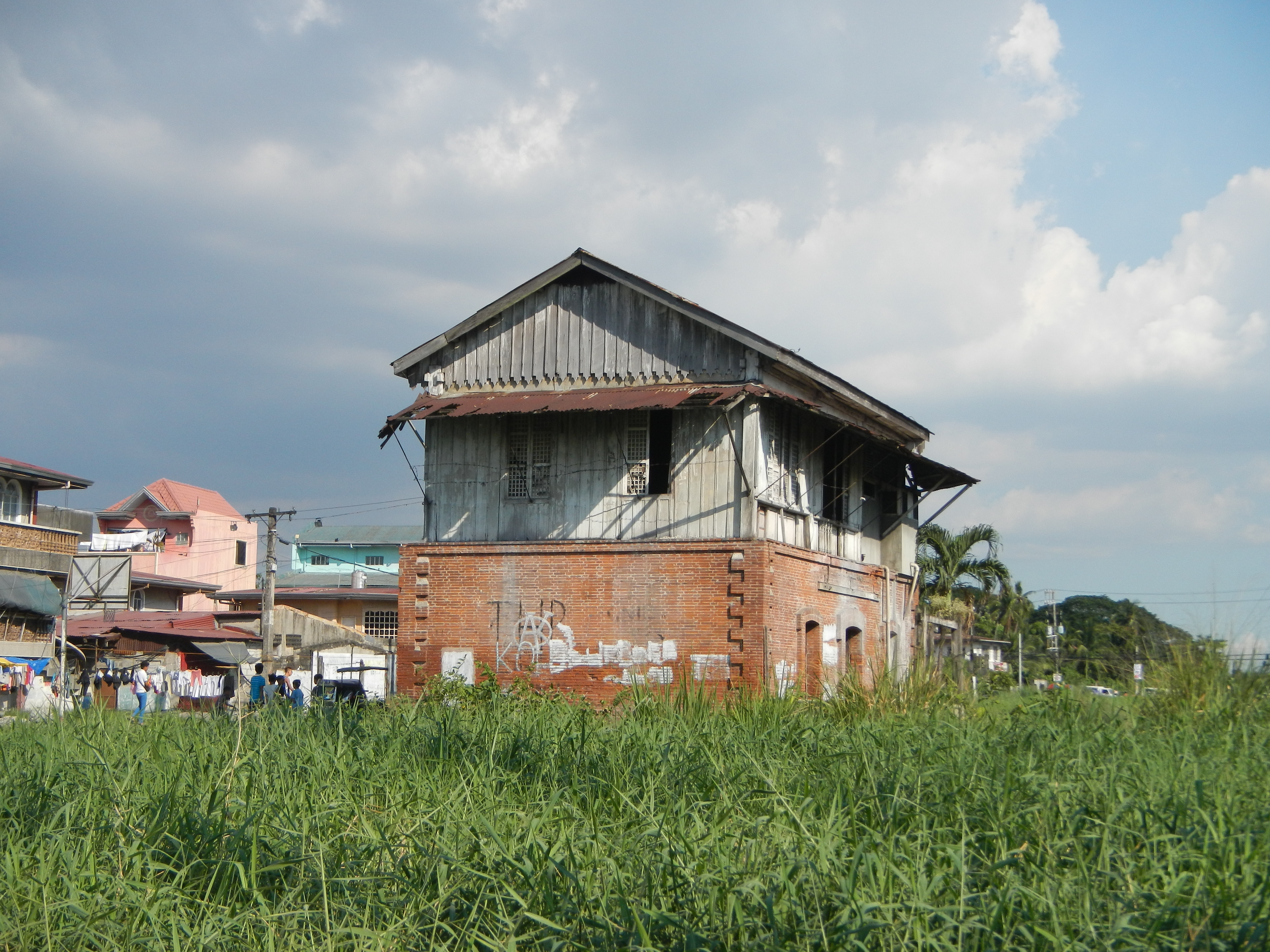
Side view of the old railway station

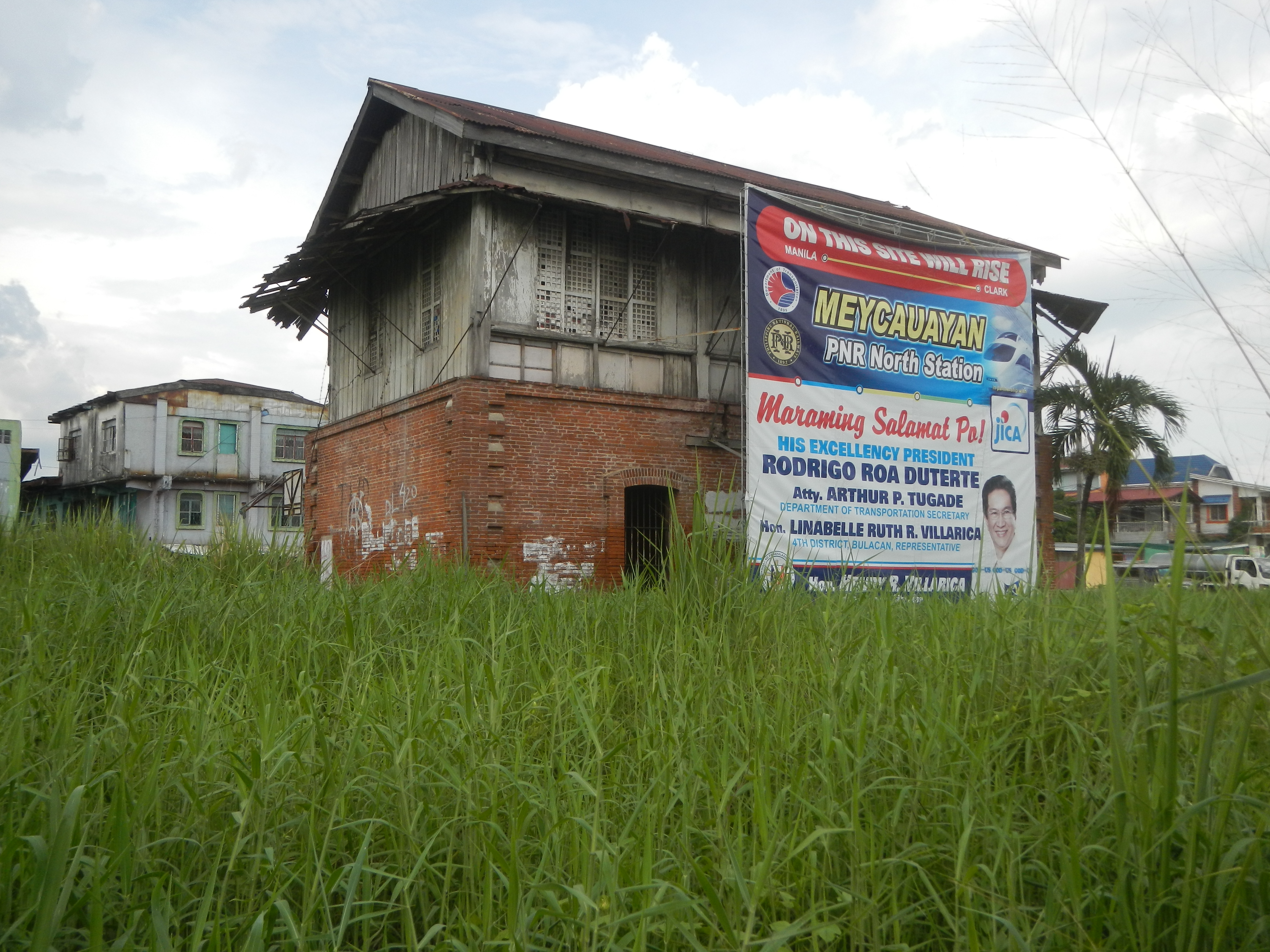
The station with a PNR North (NSCR) poster.

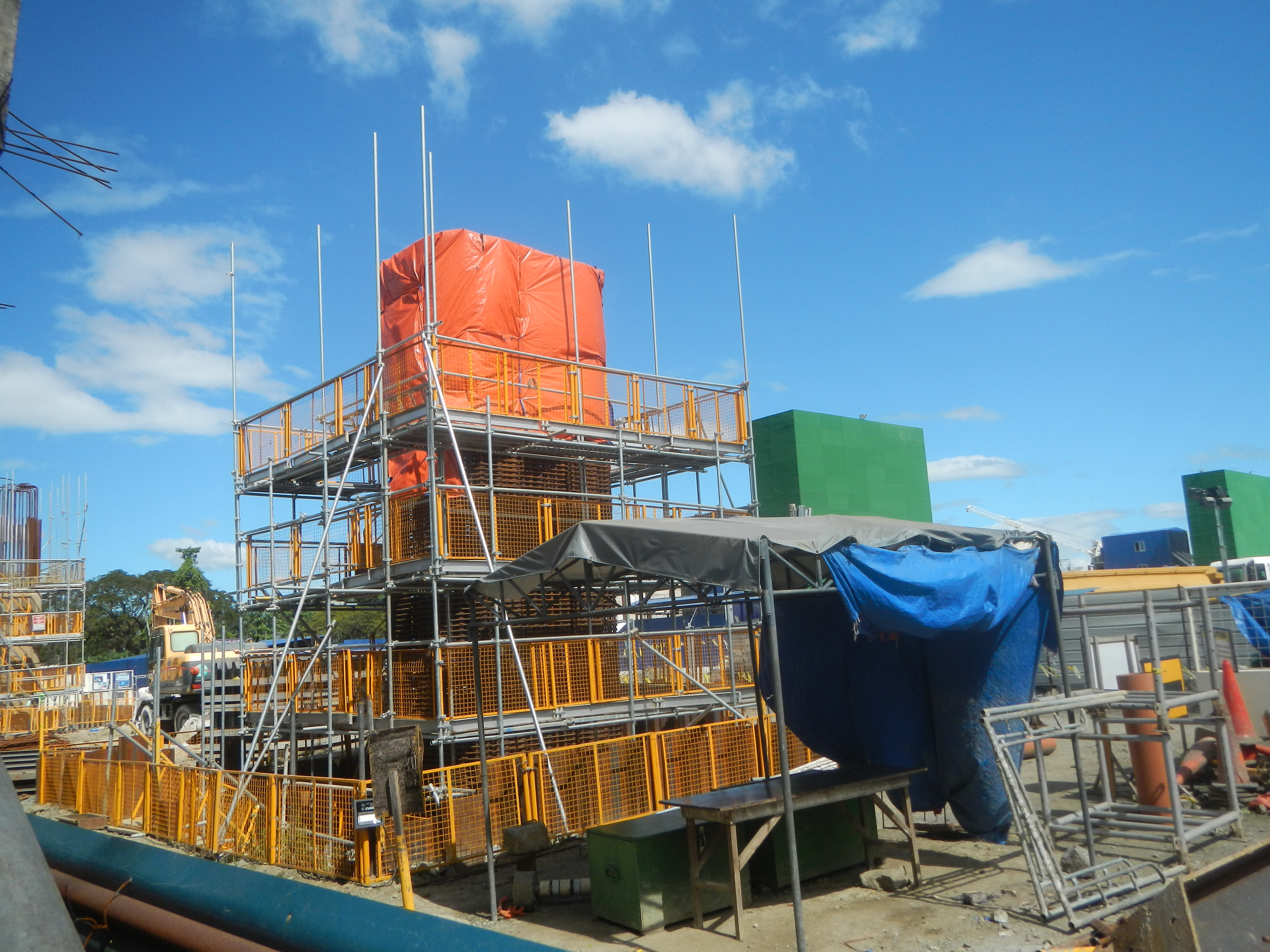
Construction near Malhacan, March 2021.

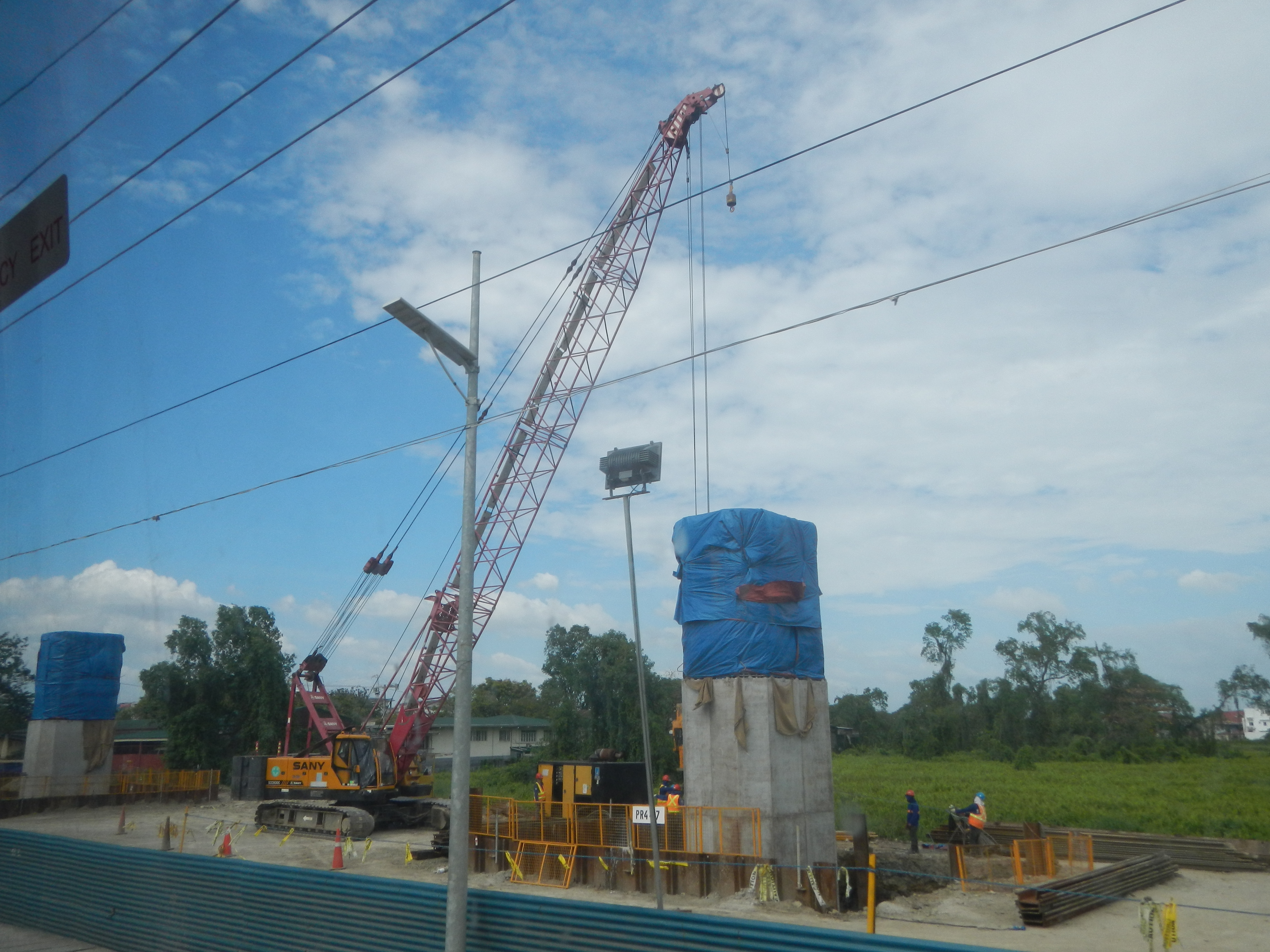
Construction of the station, March 2021.

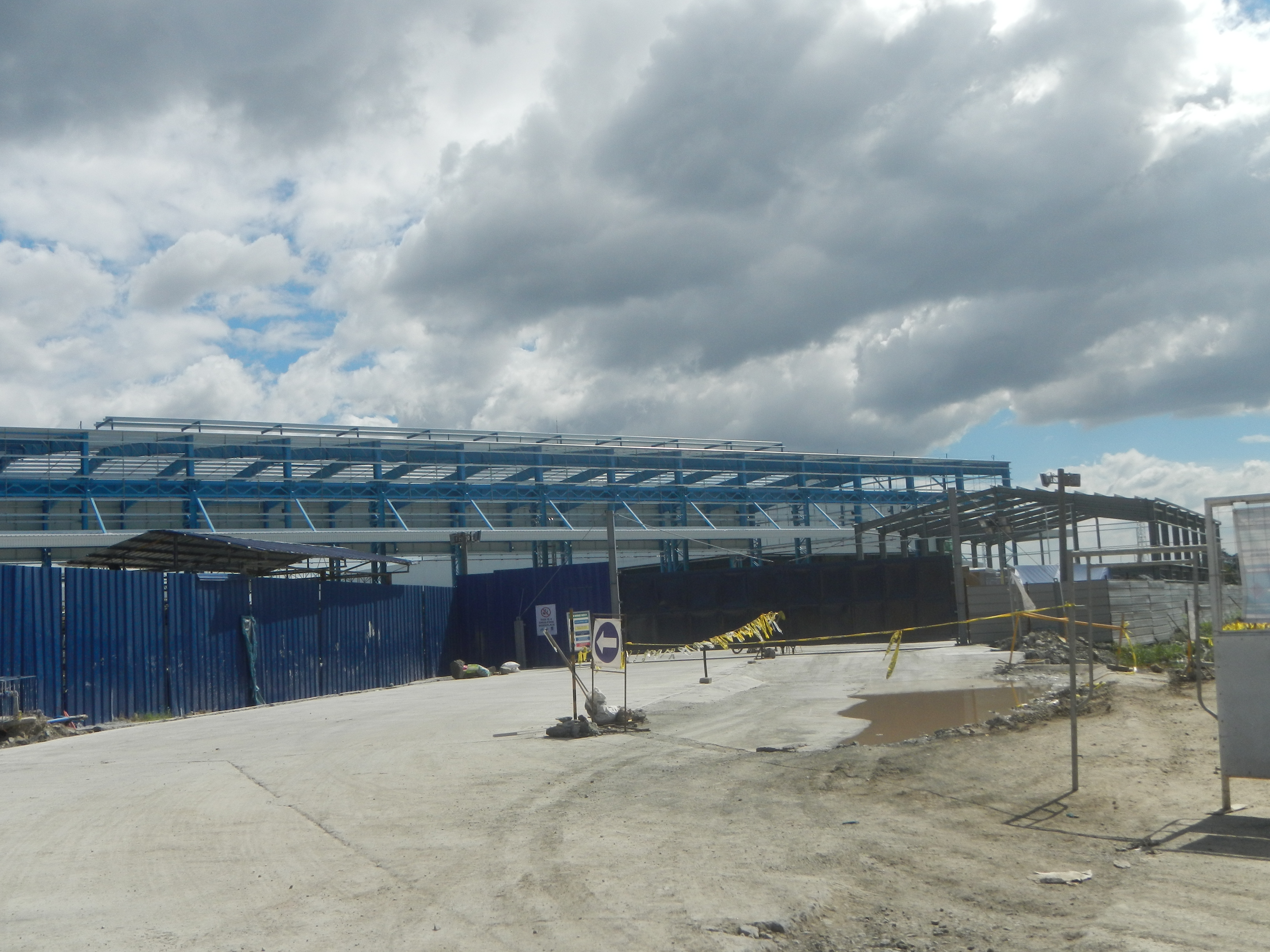
NSCR casting yard near the station.
