= Tarlac River =

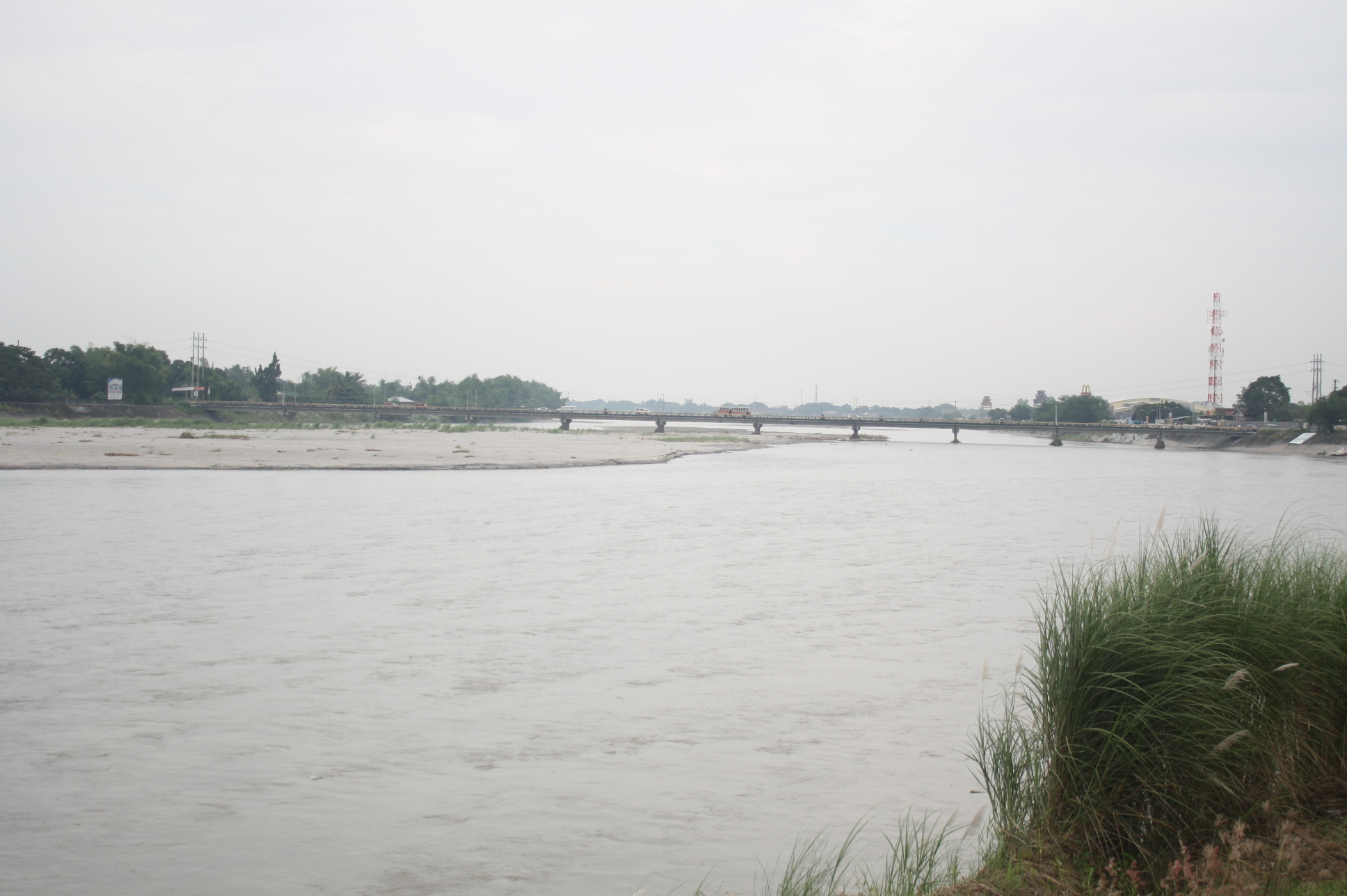
- The Aquino Bridge is one of the two bridges constructed across the Tarlac River in Tarlac City to connect the western portion of the city to the Poblacion Area, taken prior to its collapse.

- Tarlac River mouth Tarlac River (Philippines)

Location
- Country: Philippines
- Region: Central Luzon
- Province: Tarlac; Pangasinan

Physical characteristics
- Source
  - location: Mount Pinatubo, Central Luzon
  - coordinates: 15°9′29.16″N 120°20′52.8″E
  - elevation: 4,875 ft (1,486 m)
- Mouth: Poponto Swamp Agno River
  - location: Bayambang, Pangasinan
  - coordinates: 15°44′41″N 120°27′43″E
- Length: 95.2 km (59.2 mi)
- Basin size: 1,900 km^{2} (730 sq mi)
- Discharge
  - location: Agno River

Basin features
- River system: Tarlac–Poponto Swamp–Agno
- Tributaries
  - right: O'Donnel River

The Tarlac River is a river in Central Luzon, Philippines, it is the longest tributary of the Agno River with a total length of 95.2 km (59.2 mi) covering a drainage area of 1,900 square kilometres (730 sq mi) traversing the provinces of Tarlac and Pangasinan. The river originates around the vicinity of Mount Pinatubo and empties itself into the Agno River at Poponto Swamp located between the boundaries of Tarlac and Pangasinan. It was formerly the site of traditional balsa or bamboo raft riding, until the river was heavily silted by sticky lahar or mud flow brought by the eruption of Mount Pinatubo on June 15, 1991, filling the river with over 10 feet (3.0 m) of lahar. Its main tributary is the O'Donnel River in Santa Lucia, Capas, Tarlac.

The Tarlac River is dammed at Barangay Tibag in Tarlac City where its water is used for irrigation and distributed to the northern and central regions of Tarlac, the rest of the river is now a bed of sand. The river was once a good source of fish and water used for irrigation, the irrigation system now takes just about "all" of the remaining water and distributes it to barangays in Tarlac City such as Matatalaib and Maliwalo. The river bed is also being used as a source of sand and stones that can be used as construction materials.

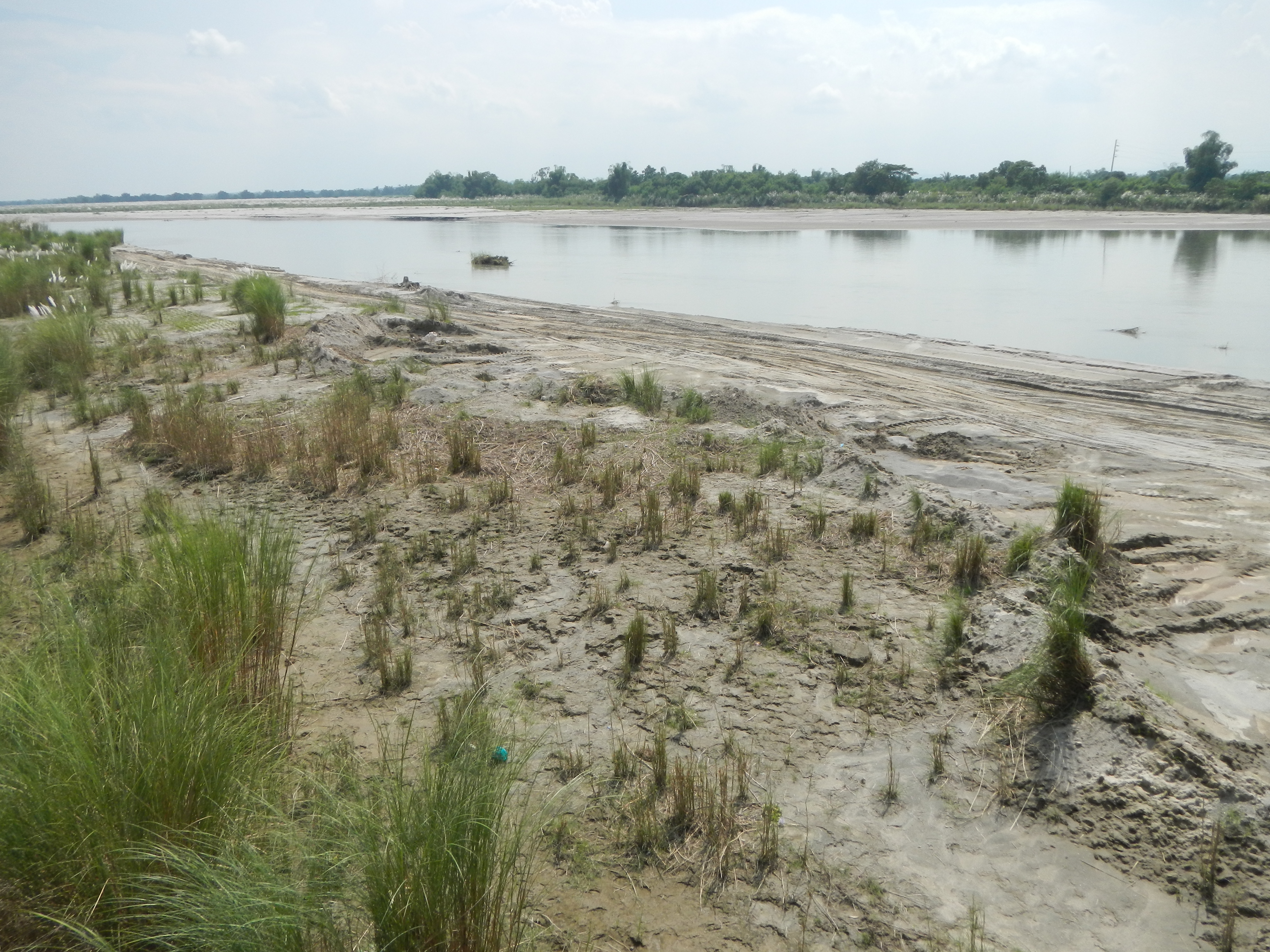
Tarlac riverbanks filled with lahar from the 1991 Mount Pinatubo eruption (2015)

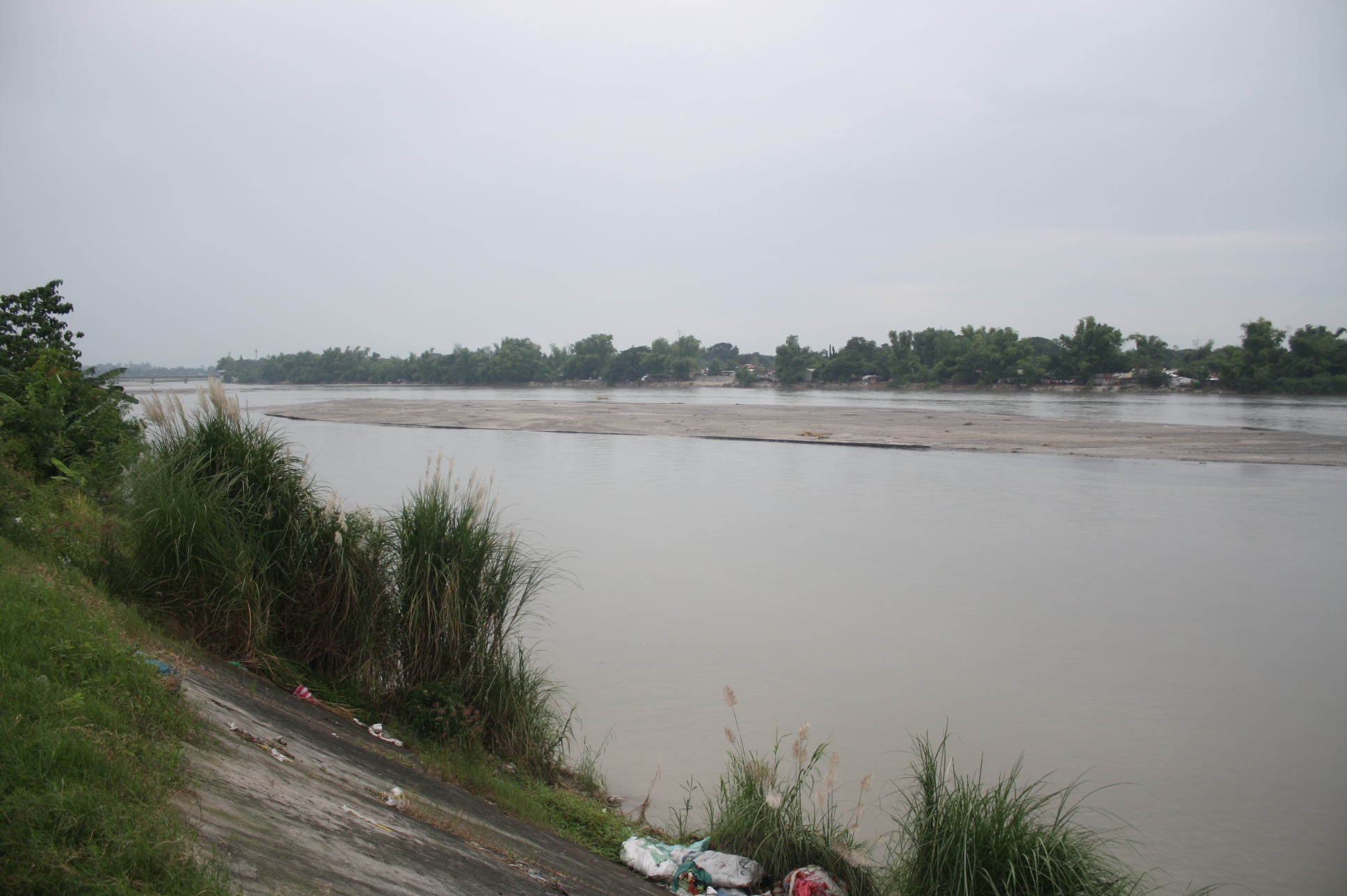
Tarlac River viewed from the Tarlac City public market

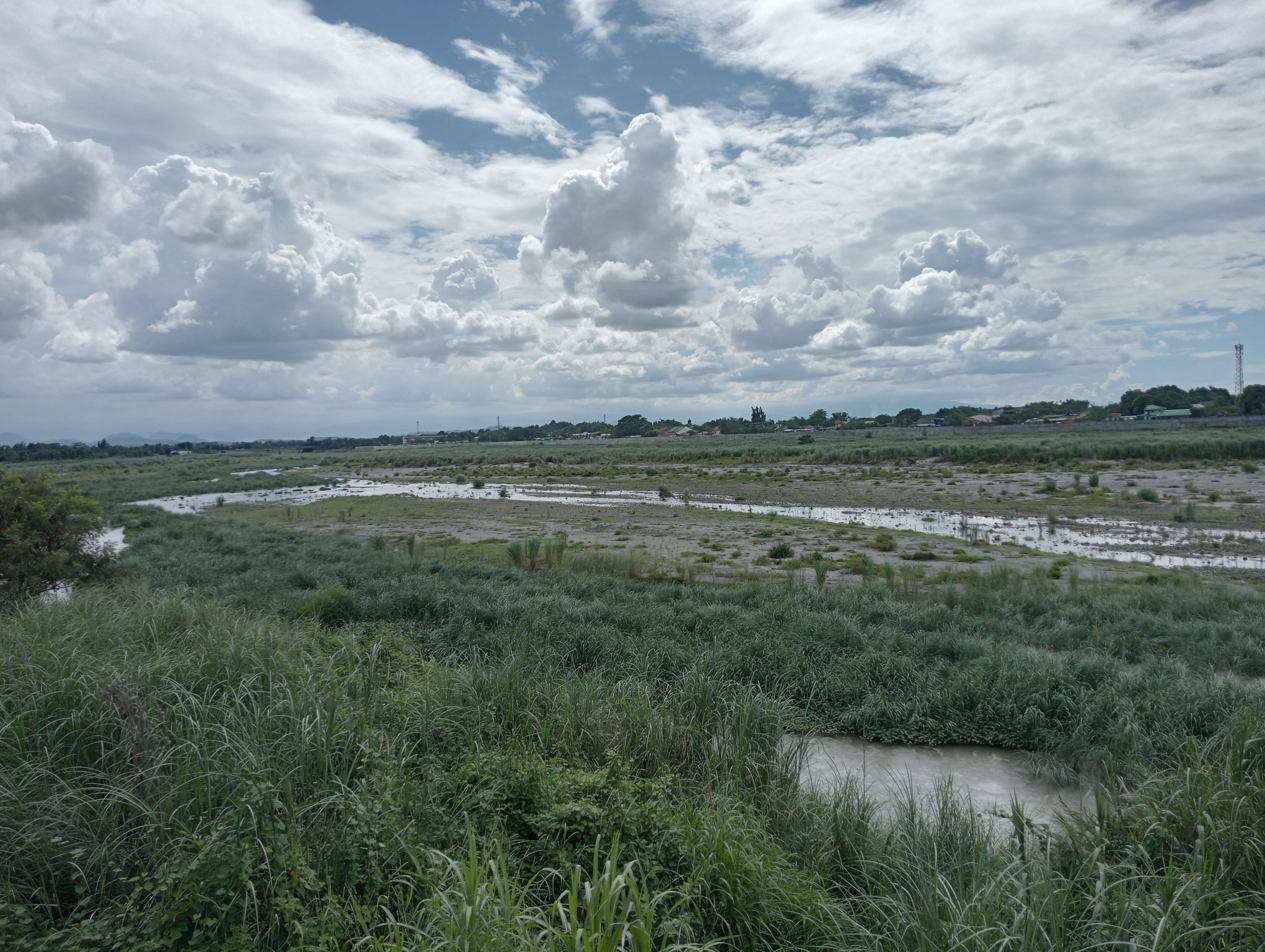
Lahar-filled riverbed overgrown with weeds, in Tarlac City

== Ninoy Aquino and Agana bridges ==
On August 28, 2026, a portion of the Ninoy Aquino bridge collapsed at nighttime due to the effects of rains and wind brought by the Habagat. Due to the bridge already showing signs of instability hours prior to collapse, no motorists were traversing the bridge at the time of its collapse.

A day later on August 29, 2026, a portion of the Agana Bridge also collapsed in the evening while a Toyota Avanza with 5 occupants was traversing it. Prior to the collapse, a truck ban for the bridge was ordered by the DPWH as a measure to prevent further instability. As of August 29, 4 people were still missing while 1 person had been rescued from the Tarlac River, with search and rescue operations still underway.

In response to the collapse of the Ninoy Aquino Bridge, DPWH Secretary Vince Dizon alongside local officials visited the site and discovered the formation of a sinkhole near the bridge. Light vehicles were diverted to the nearby Agana bridge before its collapse on the same day, while heavy vehicles and trucks were diverted to Gerona following safety risks posed by rains. Dizon ordered the construction of a temporary steel structure to reconnect both sides of the Ninoy Aquino bridge.
