= Bocaue station =

Railway station in Bulacan, Philippines

Coordinates: 14°48′1.23″N 120°55′53.58″E

Bocaue
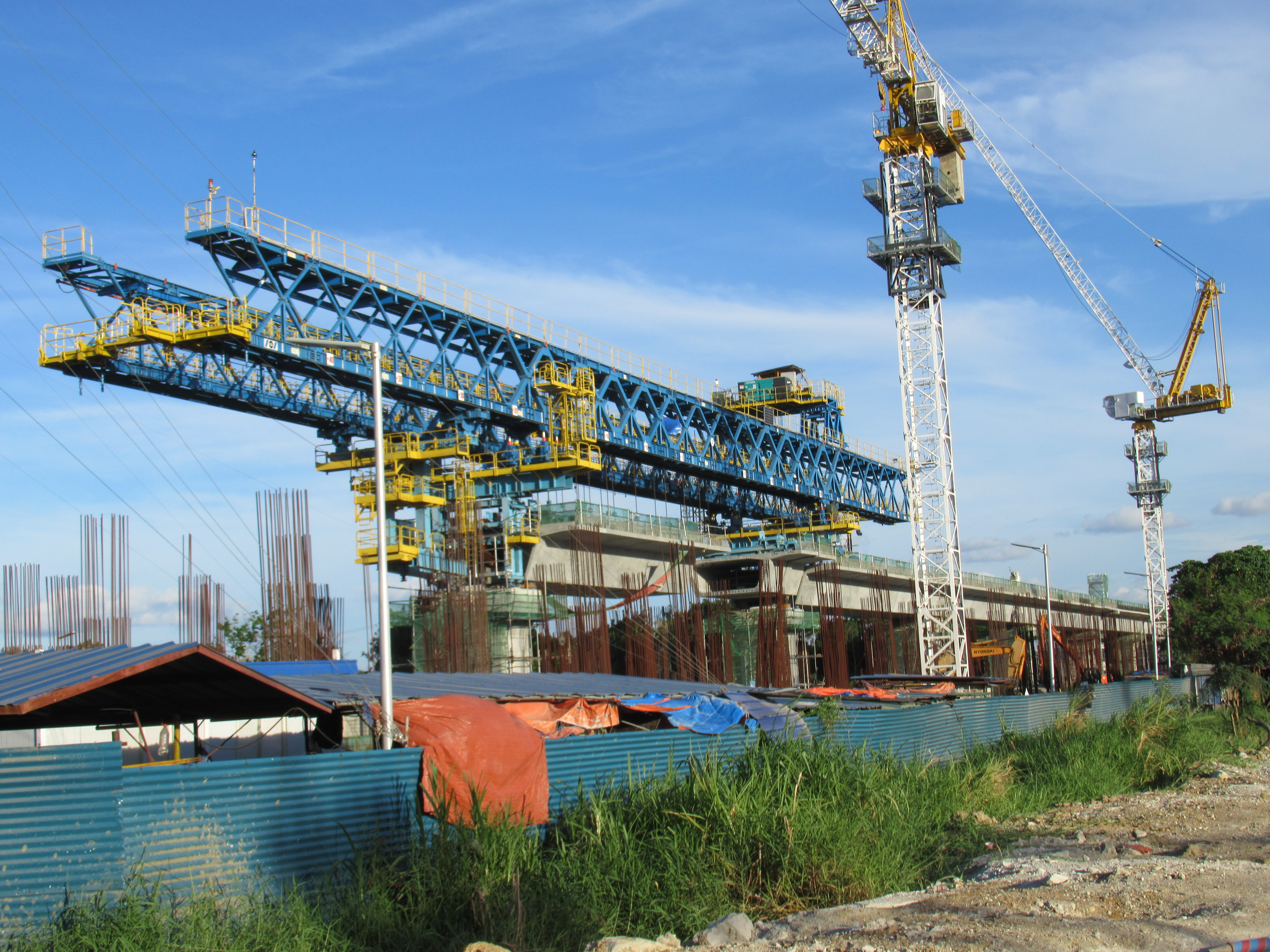
- The new station under construction, March 2022.

General information
- Location: Biñang 2nd Bocaue, Bulacan; Philippines
- Owner: Philippine National Railways
- Operator: Philippine National Railways
- Lines: Planned: North Commuter; Former: North Main Line
- Platforms: Side platform
- Tracks: 2

Construction
- Structure type: Elevated
- Architectural style: Bahay na bato (old station); Contemporary (new station)

Other information
- Status: Under construction
- Station code: BOC

Services
Commuter rail
Location
- Location within Bulacan Location within Luzon Location within Philippines

Bocaue station is an under-construction elevated North–South Commuter Railway (NSCR) station located in Bocaue, Bulacan, Philippines. The station was part of the Philippine National Railways (PNR) North Main Line before its closure in the 1980s.

== History ==
The station was first closed in 1984, but was reopened in the 1990s under the Metrotren project. It was abandoned when the North Main Line ceased operations in the 1990s. Along with Marilao station, the old station was then demolished in 2007.

The station was to be rebuilt as a part of the Northrail project, which involved the upgrading of the existing single track to an elevated dual-track system, converting the rail gauge from narrow gauge to standard gauge, and linking Manila to Malolos in Bulacan and further on to Angeles City, Clark Special Economic Zone and Clark International Airport. The project commenced in 2007, but was repeatedly halted then discontinued in 2011. It is currently being rebuilt as part of the first phase of the North–South Commuter Railway.
