= Marilao station =

Former railway station in Bulacan, Philippines

Coordinates: 14°45′49.44″N 120°56′58.83″E

Marilao
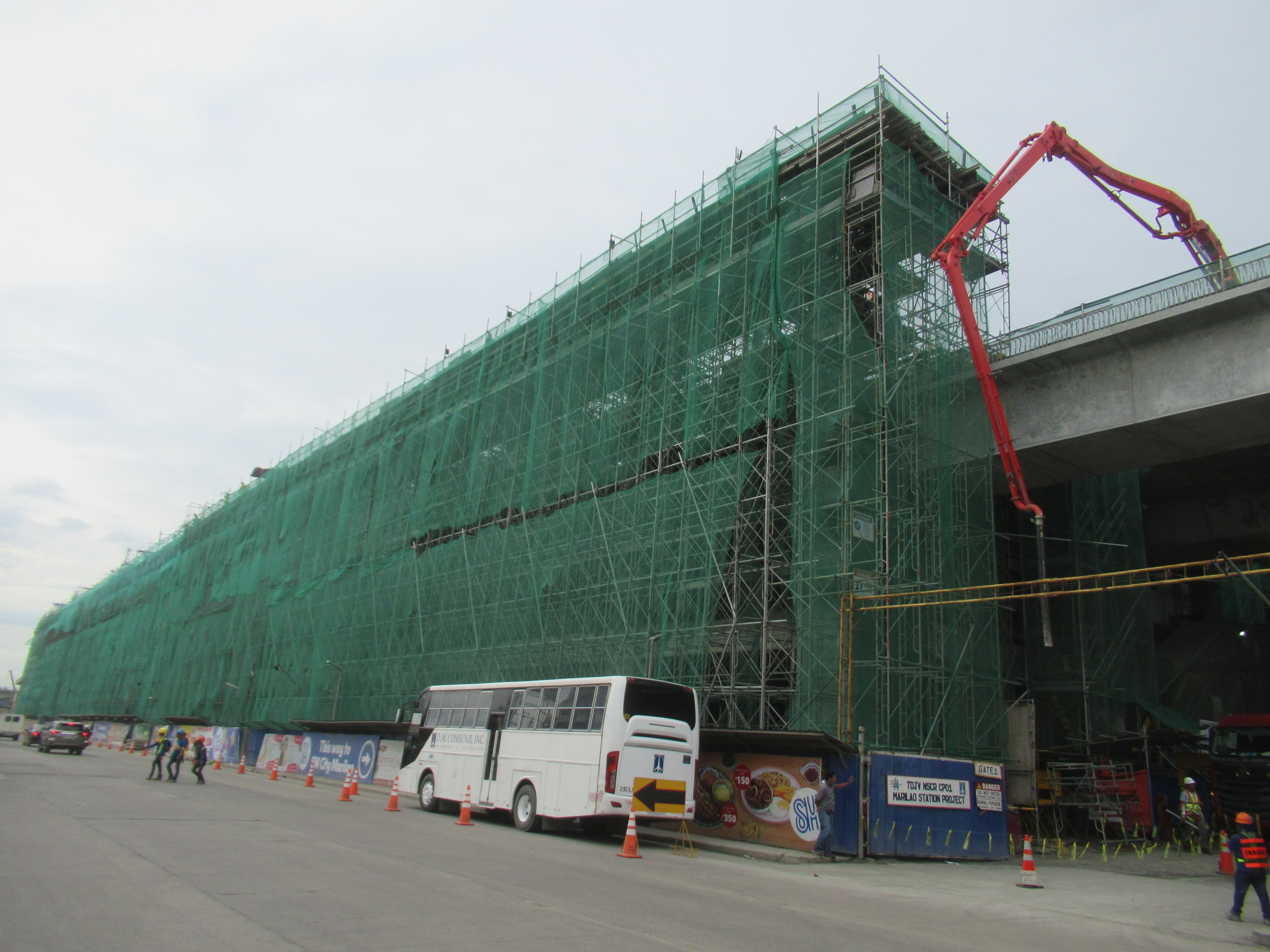
- The new station under construction, June 2024

General information
- Location: Ibayo; Marilao, Bulacan; Philippines
- Owner: Philippine National Railways
- Operator: Philippine National Railways
- Lines: Planned: North Commuter; Former: North Main Line
- Platforms: Island platform
- Tracks: 4

Construction
- Structure type: Elevated
- Architectural style: Bahay na bato (old station); Contemporary (new station)

Other information
- Status: Under construction
- Station code: MR

History
- Opened: March 24, 1891
- Closed: 1988
Future services
Preceding station	PNR	Following station
Tabing Ilog towards Clark International Airport	NSCR Commuter CIA–Calamba	Meycauayan towards Calamba
Tabing Ilog towards New Clark City	NSCR Commuter NCC–Tutuban	Meycauayan towards Tutuban
Bocaue towards Clark International Airport	Commuter Express CIA–Calamba	Meycauayan towards Calamba
Bocaue towards New Clark City	Commuter Express NCC–Tutuban	Meycauayan towards Tutuban
Location
- Location within Bulacan Location within Luzon Location within Philippines

Marilao station is an under-construction elevated North–South Commuter Railway (NSCR) station located in Marilao, Bulacan, Philippines. The station was part of the Philippine National Railways (PNR) North Main Line before its closure in the 1980s.

The new station is near SM City Marilao and will be linked to the mall.

== History ==
The station was first closed in 1984, but was reopened in 1990 under the Metrotren project. It was abandoned when the North Main Line ceased operations in 1997. Along with Bocaue station, the old station was then demolished in 2007.

The station was to be rebuilt as a part of the Northrail project, which involved the upgrading of the existing single track to an elevated dual-track system, converting the rail gauge from narrow gauge to standard gauge, and linking Manila to Malolos in Bulacan and further on to Angeles City, Clark Special Economic Zone and Clark International Airport. The project commenced in 2007, but was repeatedly halted then discontinued in 2011. The constructor of Valenzuela–Meycauayan-Marilao-Bocaue section is a DATEM, Inc.–DMCI–Taisei Corporation Joint Venture. The station has three floors with a floor area of 28,422.05 square meters (305,932.4 sq ft).

As of June 2024, the station is over 50% complete. Partial operations are slated to begin by 2027.
