= Poponto Swamp =

Swamp in Luzon, Philippines

Poponto Swamp is a swamp in Luzon, Philippines, located at the boundary of Tarlac and Pangasinan provinces. This 25-square kilometer swamp can be found at the confluence of the Agno and Tarlac rivers. It is near the town of Bayambang, Pangasinan. It is also known as the Mangabol Marsh.
