= 1991 eruption of Mount Pinatubo =

Volcanic eruption in the Philippines

Mount Pinatubo eruption of 1991
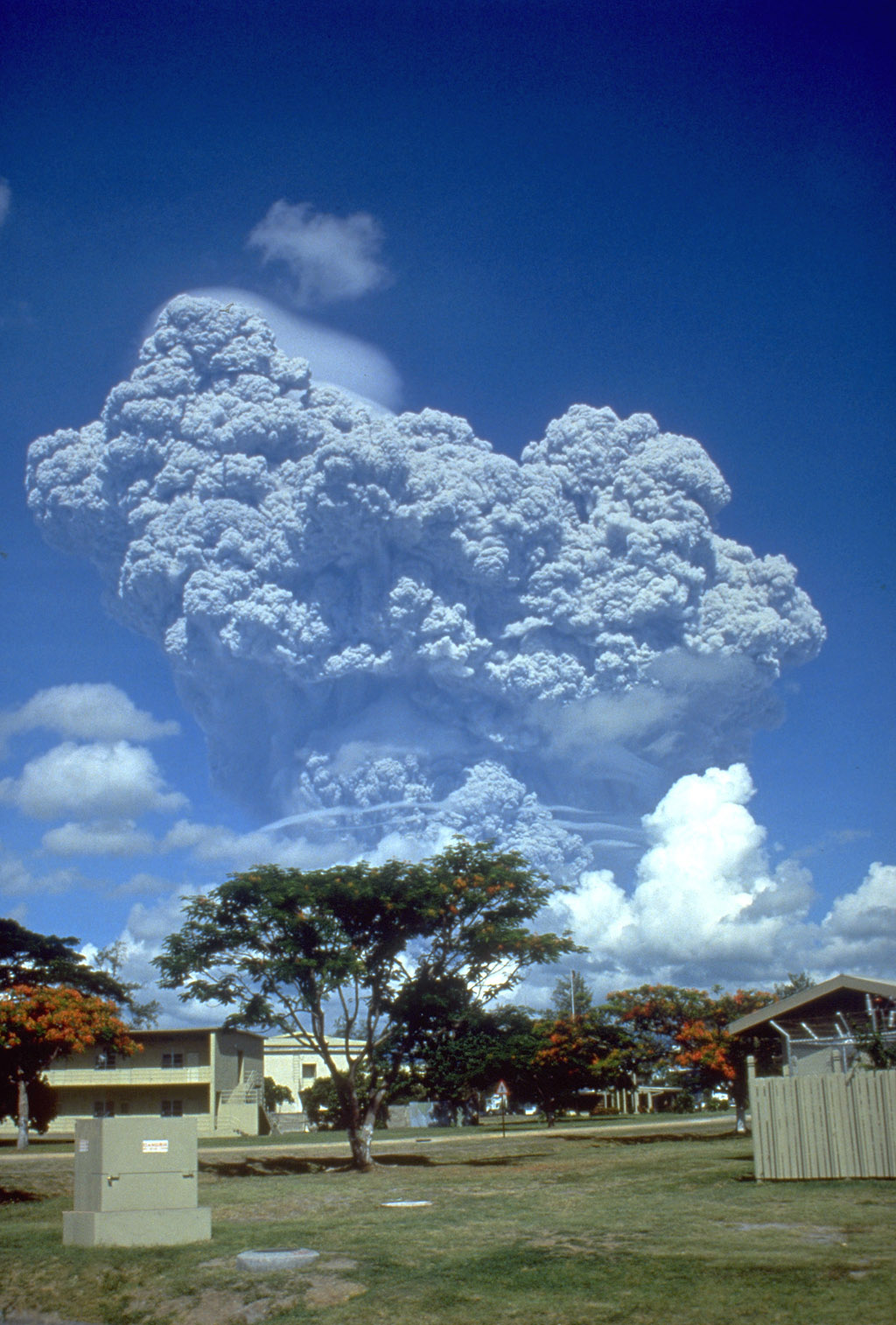
- Eruption column on June 12, 1991
- Volcano: Mount Pinatubo
- Start date: April 2, 1991
- End date: September 2, 1991
- Type: Phreatic, Ultra-Plinian
- Location: Zambales Mountains, Central Luzon, Philippines; 15°08′30″N 120°21′00″E
- VEI: 6
- Impact: About 20,000 people evacuated; 847 people killed and approximately 10,000 people left homeless; Huge destruction left in surrounding areas; Release of 17-20 megatons of sulfur dioxide into the atmosphere, causing global cooling by 0.5 °C (0.9 °F) between 1991 and 1993; Lahars and mudflows inundated some portions of Pampanga, Tarlac, and Zambales after the eruption.

The 1991 eruption of Mount Pinatubo in the Philippines' Luzon Volcanic Arc was the second-largest volcanic eruption of the 20th century, behind only the 1912 eruption of Novarupta in Alaska. Eruptive activity began on April 2 as a series of phreatic explosions from a fissure that opened on the north side of Mount Pinatubo. Seismographs were set up and began monitoring the volcano for earthquakes. In late May, the number of seismic events under the volcano fluctuated from day-to-day. Beginning June 6, a swarm of progressively shallower earthquakes accompanied by inflationary tilt on the upper east flank of the mountain, culminated in the extrusion of a small lava dome.

On June 12, the volcano's first spectacular eruption sent an ash column 19 km (12 mi) into the atmosphere. Additional explosions occurred overnight and the morning of June 13. Seismic activity during this period became intense. When even more highly gas-charged magma reached Pinatubo's surface on June 15, 1991, the volcano exploded, sending an ash cloud 35 km (22 mi) into the atmosphere. Volcanic ash and pumice blanketed the countryside. Huge pyroclastic flows roared down the flanks of Pinatubo, filling once-deep valleys with fresh volcanic deposits as much as 200 m (660 ft) thick. The eruption removed so much magma and rock from beneath the volcano that the summit collapsed to form a small caldera 2.5 km (1.6 mi) across.

Fine ash from the eruption fell as far away as the Indian Ocean and satellites tracked the ash cloud as it traveled several times around the globe. At least 16 commercial jets inadvertently flew through the drifting ash cloud, sustaining about $100 million in damage. With the ash fall came darkness and the sounds of lahars rumbling down nearby river valleys. Several smaller lahars washed through the Clark Air Base, flowing across the base in enormously powerful sheets, slamming into buildings and scattering cars. Nearly every bridge within 30 km (19 mi) of Mount Pinatubo was destroyed. Several lowland towns were flooded or partially buried in mud. More than 840 people were killed from the collapse of roofs under wet heavy ash and several more were injured.

Rain continued to create hazards over the next several years, as the volcanic deposits were remobilized into secondary mudflows. Damage to bridges, irrigation-canal systems, roads, cropland, and urban areas occurred in the wake of each significant rainfall. Many more people were affected for much longer by rain-induced lahars than by the eruption itself.

== Build-up and evacuations ==
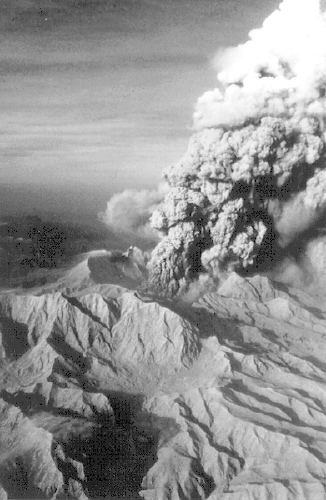
Aerial view of Mount Pinatubo in June 22, 1991 a ashfall was still there before it was formation of Lake Pinatubo

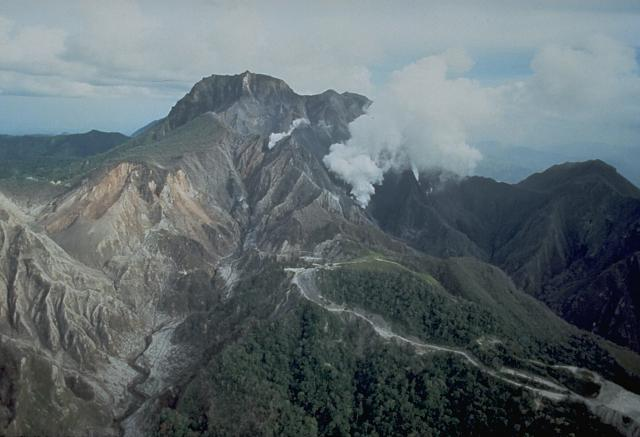
Pinatubo as viewed from the north in late April 1991. Grayish-tan ash and several craters from the April 2 phreatic explosions are visible at the left.

On July 16, 1990, a magnitude 7.8 earthquake struck northern Central Luzon and the Cordilleras. This was the largest earthquake recorded in 1990. Its epicenter was in the municipality of Rizal, Nueva Ecija, about 100 km (62 mi) northeast of Pinatubo, and faulted northwest–southeast through three provinces. It also followed the Philippine Fault System west as far as Baguio, which was devastated, and is located about 80 km (50 mi) north-northeast of Pinatubo, leading volcanologists to speculate that it might ultimately have triggered the 1991 eruption, although this is impossible to prove conclusively.

Two weeks after the earthquake, local residents reported steam coming from the volcano, but scientists who visited there in response found only small rockslides rather than any pre-eruptive activity. On March 15, 1991, a succession of earthquakes were felt by villagers on the northwestern side of the volcano. Further earthquakes of increasing intensity were felt over the next two weeks, and it became clear some kind of volcanic activity was likely.

On April 2, the volcano woke up, with phreatic eruptions occurring near the summit along a 1.5-kilometre-long (0.93 mi) fissure. Over the next few weeks, small eruptions continued, dusting the surrounding areas with volcanic ash. Seismographs recorded hundreds of small earthquakes every day. Scientists immediately installed monitoring equipment and analyzed the volcano for clues as to its previous eruptive history. Radiocarbon dating of charcoal found in old volcanic deposits revealed the last three major explosive eruption periods in recent millennia, about 5,500, 3,500 and 500 years ago. Geological mapping showed that much of the surrounding plains were formed by lahar flood deposits from previous eruptions.

Volcanic activity increased throughout May. Measurements of sulfur dioxide emissions showed a rapid increase from 500 tonnes (550 short tons) per day by May 13 to 5,000 t (5,500 short tons) per day by May 28. This implied that there was a rising column of fresh magma beneath the volcano. After May 28, the amount of SO_{2} being emitted decreased substantially, raising fears that the degassing of the magma had been blocked somehow, leading to a pressure build-up in the magma chamber and a high likelihood of violent explosive eruptions.

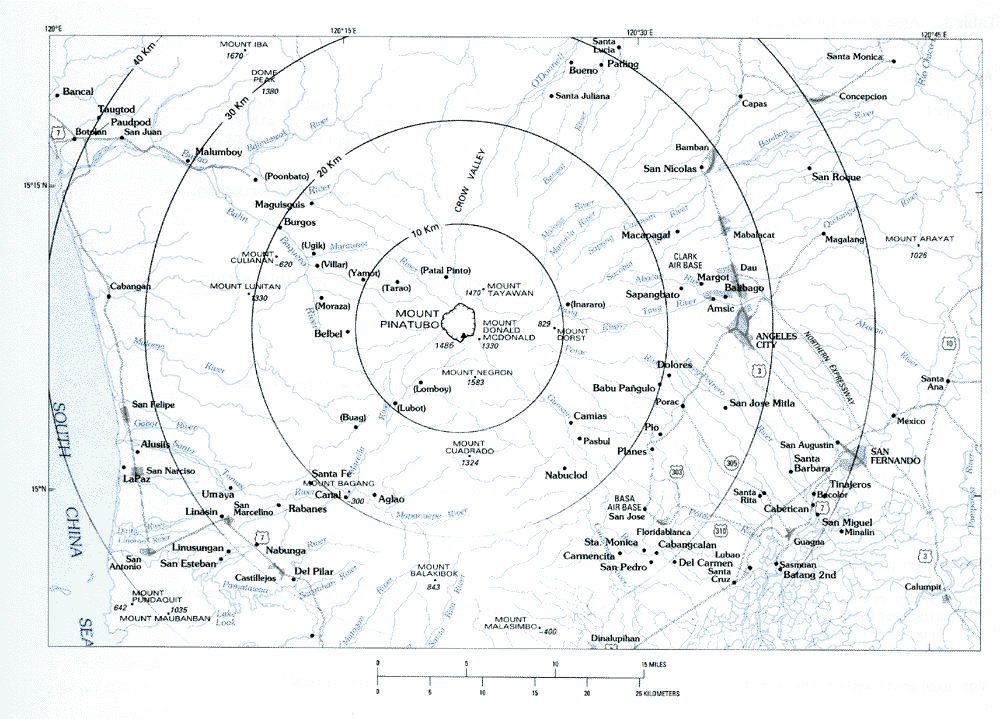
A map of Mount Pinatubo showing nearby peaks and the evacuation zones

In early June, tiltmeter measurements had shown that the volcano was gradually inflating, evidently due to fast-growing amounts of magma filling the reservoir beneath the summit. At the same time, seismic activity, previously concentrated at a depth of a few kilometers below a point about 5 kilometres (3.1 mi) northwest of the summit, shifted to shallow depths just below the summit. Such an event is a precursor of volcano tectonic earthquakes.

Given all the signs that a very large eruption was imminent, the Philippine Institute of Volcanology and Seismology—assisted by the United States Geological Survey—worked to convince local inhabitants of the high severity of the threat. A false warning might have led to cynicism about any later warnings, but delaying a warning until an eruption began might lead to thousands of deaths, so the volcanologists were under some pressure to deliver a timely and accurate assessment of the volcanic risk.

Three successive evacuation zones were defined, the innermost containing everything within 10 km (6.2 mi) of the volcano's summit, the second extending 10–20 km (6.2–12.4 mi) from the summit, and the third extending from 20–40 km (12–25 mi) from the summit (Clark Air Base and Angeles City were in this zone). The 10 km and 10–20 km zones had a total population of about 40,000 inhabitants, while some more 331,000 inhabitants lived in the 20–40 km zone.

Five stages of volcanic alert were defined, from level 1 (low-level seismic disturbances) up to level 5 (major eruption in progress). Daily alerts were issued stating the alert level and associated danger area, and the information was announced in major regional and national newspapers, on radio and television stations, by nongovernmental organizations (NGOs) and directly to the endangered inhabitants.

Many of the Aetas who lived on the slopes of the volcano left their villages of their own volition when the first blasts began in April, gathering in a village about 12 kilometres (7.5 mi) from the summit. They moved to increasingly distant settlements as the eruptions escalated, some Aetas moving up to nine times in the two months before the colossal eruption. The first formal evacuations were ordered for the 10-kilometre (6.2 mi) zone on April 7. Evacuation of the 10–20 km (6.2–12.4 mi) zone was ordered when a level 4 alert was issued on June 7. A level 5 alert triggered evacuation of the 20–40 km (12–25 mi) zone on June 13, and in all some 60,000 people had left the area within 30 km (19 mi) of the volcano before June 15. Most people temporarily relocated to Metro Manila, with some 30,000 using the Amoranto Velodrome in Quezon City as an evacuee camp.

On June 7, the first magmatic eruptions took place with the formation of a lava dome at the summit of the volcano. The dome grew substantially over the next five days, reaching a maximum diameter of about 200 m (660 ft) and a height of 40 m (130 ft).

== Escalation of eruption ==
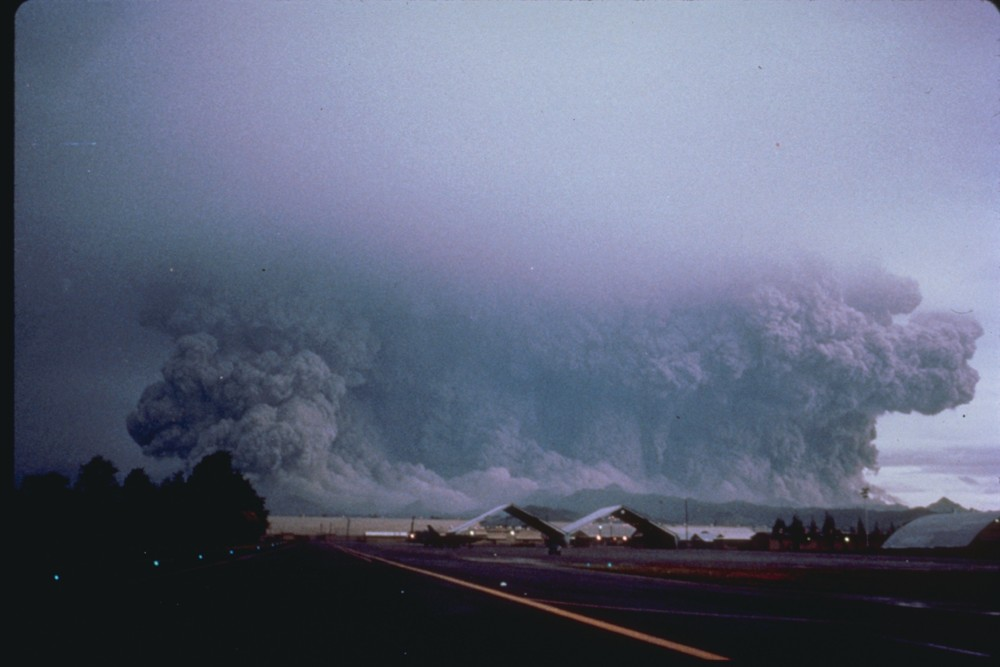
A view to the west from Clark Air Base of the major eruption of Pinatubo on June 15, 1991. The June 15–16 climactic phase lasted more than fifteen hours, sent tephra about 35 km (22 mi) into the atmosphere, generated voluminous pyroclastic flows, and left a caldera in the former summit region. Later dubbed Black Saturday, the day of darkness stretched for 36 hours.

A small blast at 03:41 on June 12 marked the beginning of a new, more violent phase of the eruption. A few hours later the same day, massive blasts lasting about half an hour generated big eruption columns, which quickly reached heights of over 19 kilometres (12 mi) and which generated large pyroclastic surges extending up to four kilometres (2.5 mi) from the summit in some river valleys. One witness at Subic Bay described the explosion as 'hitting him as a whoosh of pressure'. Fourteen hours later, a 15-minute blast hurled volcanic matter to heights of 24 km (15 mi). Friction in the up-rushing ash column generated abundant volcanic lightning.

A third large eruption began at 08:41 on June 13, after an intense swarm of small earthquakes over the previous two hours. It lasted about five minutes, and the eruption column once again reached 24 km (15 mi). After three hours of quiet, seismic activity began, growing more and more intense over the next twenty-four hours, until a three-minute eruptive blast generated a 21-kilometre-high (13 mi) eruption column at 13:09 on June 14.

Tephra fall from these four large eruptions was extensive to the southwest of the volcano. Two hours after the last of these four explosions, a series of eruptions began which lasted for the next twenty-four hours, and which saw the production of much larger pyroclastic flows and surges which travelled several kilometres down river valleys on the flanks of the volcano. In total, almost 400 km^{2} (150 sq mi) of land was buried by pyroclastic density currents which travelled in all directions, and reached at least 12 km (7.5 mi), and as far as 16 km (9.9 mi), from the volcano. The land closest to the eruption was eroded by the pyroclastic currents, which did not leave much deposit there.

Dacite was the dominant igneous rock making up the tephra in these eruptions and in the following climactic event. The most abundant phenocryst minerals were hornblende and plagioclase, but an unusual phenocryst mineral was also present—the calcium sulfate called anhydrite. The dacite magma was more oxidized than most magmas, and the sulfur-rich nature of the eruption was probably causally related to the redox state.

The final, climactic eruption of Mount Pinatubo began at 13:42 on June 15. It caused numerous major earthquakes due to the collapse of the summit and the creation of a caldera 2.5 km (1.6 mi) in diameter, reducing the peak from 1,745 m (5,725 ft) to 1,486 m (4,875 ft).

All the seismographs close to Clark Air Base had been rendered completely inoperative by 14:30, mostly by super-massive pyroclastic surges. Intense atmospheric pressure variation was also recorded.

On the same day, Typhoon Yunya, locally named Diding, struck the island, with its center passing about 75 km (47 mi) north of the volcano. The typhoon rains mostly obscured the eruption, but measurements showed that ash was ejected to a height of 34 km (21 mi) by the most violent phase of the eruption, which lasted about three hours. Pyroclastic surges poured from the summit, reaching as far as 16 km (9.9 mi) away from their origin point. Typhoon rains and flooding, mixed with the ash deposits, caused a messy rain of mud and massive lahars.

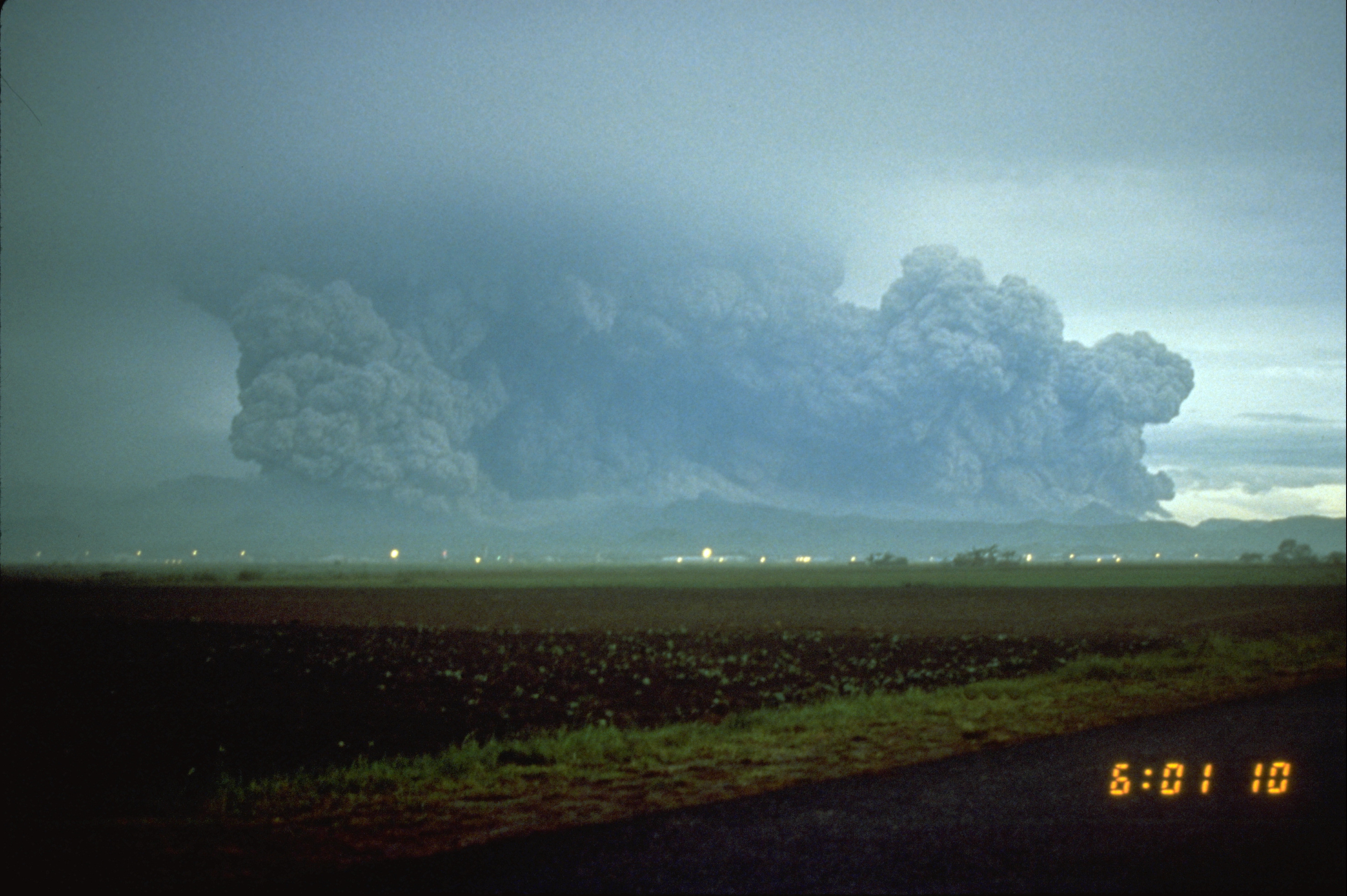
The eruption cloud on the morning of June 15, 1991. About 7 hours before the start of the climactic eruption

The volcanic column from the crater covered an area of some 125,000 km^{2} (48,000 sq mi), bringing total darkness to much of Central Luzon for 36 hours. Almost all of the island received some wet ash fall, which formed a heavy, rain-saturated snow-like blanket. Tephra fell over most of the South China Sea and ash falls were recorded as far away as Vietnam, Cambodia, Singapore, Malaysia and Indonesia.

Twelve days after the first magmatic eruptions of June 3, on June 15, 1991, by about 22:30, and about nine hours after the onset of the most recent climactic phase, atmospheric pressure waves had decreased to the pre-eruption levels. No seismic records were available at this time, but volcanologists believe 22:30 marked the end of the climactic eruption.

Vast quantities of light and heavy metal minerals were brought to the surface. Overall an estimated 800,000 t (880,000 short tons) of zinc-, 600,000 t (660,000 short tons) of copper-, 550,000 tonnes (610,000 short tons) of chromium-, 300,000 t (330,000 short tons) of nickel-, and massive amounts of potentially toxic heavy metal mineral such as 100,000 tonnes (110,000 short tons) of lead-, 10,000 t (11,000 short tons) of arsenic-, 1,000 t (1,100 short tons) of cadmium-, and 800 t (880 short tons) of mercury-minerals comingled with the other magmatic rock, came forth.

== Effects on aircraft ==
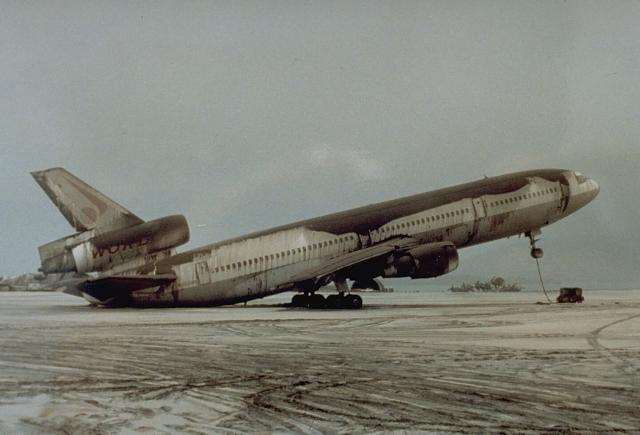
A DC-10-30 resting on its tail due to Pinatubo ashfall

At least 16 commercial aircraft had damaging in-flight encounters with the ash cloud ejected by the June 15 eruption, and many grounded aircraft were also significantly damaged. In-flight encounters caused loss of power to one engine on two different aircraft. Ten engines were damaged and replaced, including all three engines of one DC-10. Longer-term damage to aircraft and engines was reported, including accumulation of sulfate deposits on engines. The eruption also irreparably damaged the Philippine Air Force's recently retired fleet of Vought F-8s, as these were in open storage at Basa Air Base at the time.

== Aftermath ==
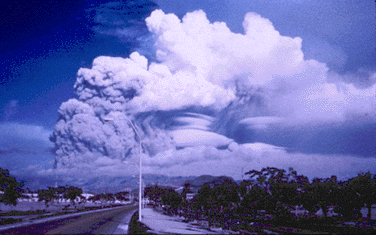
Mount Pinatubo in June 15, 1991

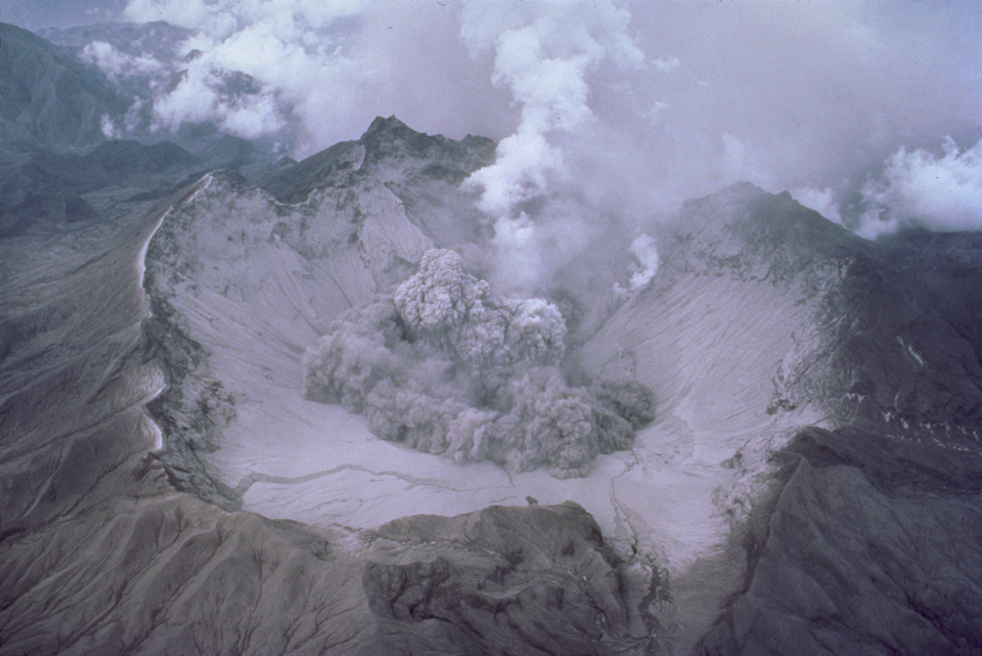
The summit caldera as seen on August 1, 1991. Lake Pinatubo later formed on the caldera.

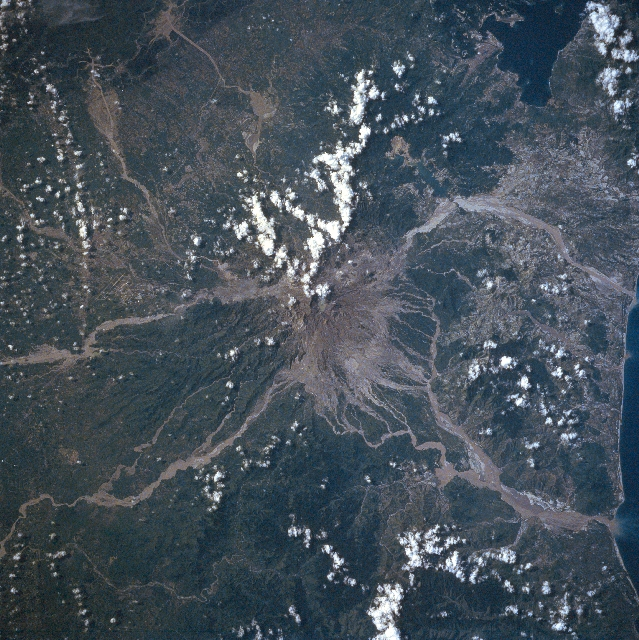
Mount Pinatubo as seen from Space Shuttle Atlantis in 1992. Thick ash and lahar deposits on the volcano and in surrounding river valleys are evident.

=== Explosivity of the eruption ===
The 1991 eruption rated 6 on the Volcanic Explosivity Index and came some 450–500 years after the volcano's last known eruptive activity. The eruption ejected over 10 km^{3} (2.4 cu mi) of material, making it the largest eruption of the 20th century since that of Novarupta in 1912 and ten times larger than the 1980 eruption of Mount St. Helens. Ejected material such as tephra fallout and pyroclastic flow deposits are much less dense than magma, and the volume of ejected material was equivalent to about five cubic kilometres (1.2 cu mi) of unerupted material. Thermal energy released during the eruption was equal to 70 megatons of TNT.

The former summit of the volcano was obliterated and replaced by a caldera 2.5 km (1.6 mi) wide. The highest point on the caldera rim now stood 1,485 m (4,872 ft) above sea level, some 260 m (850 ft) lower than the pre-eruption summit.

=== Death toll ===
The eruption killed 847 people, mostly by roofs collapsing under a load of accumulated volcanic matter, a hazard amplified by the simultaneous arrival of Typhoon Yunya.

Evacuation operations days before the eruption saved thousands of lives.

After the eruption, about 500,000 people continue to live within 40 km (25 mi) of the volcano, with population centers including the 150,000 in Angeles City and 30,000 at Clark Freeport Zone.

=== Effects on agriculture ===
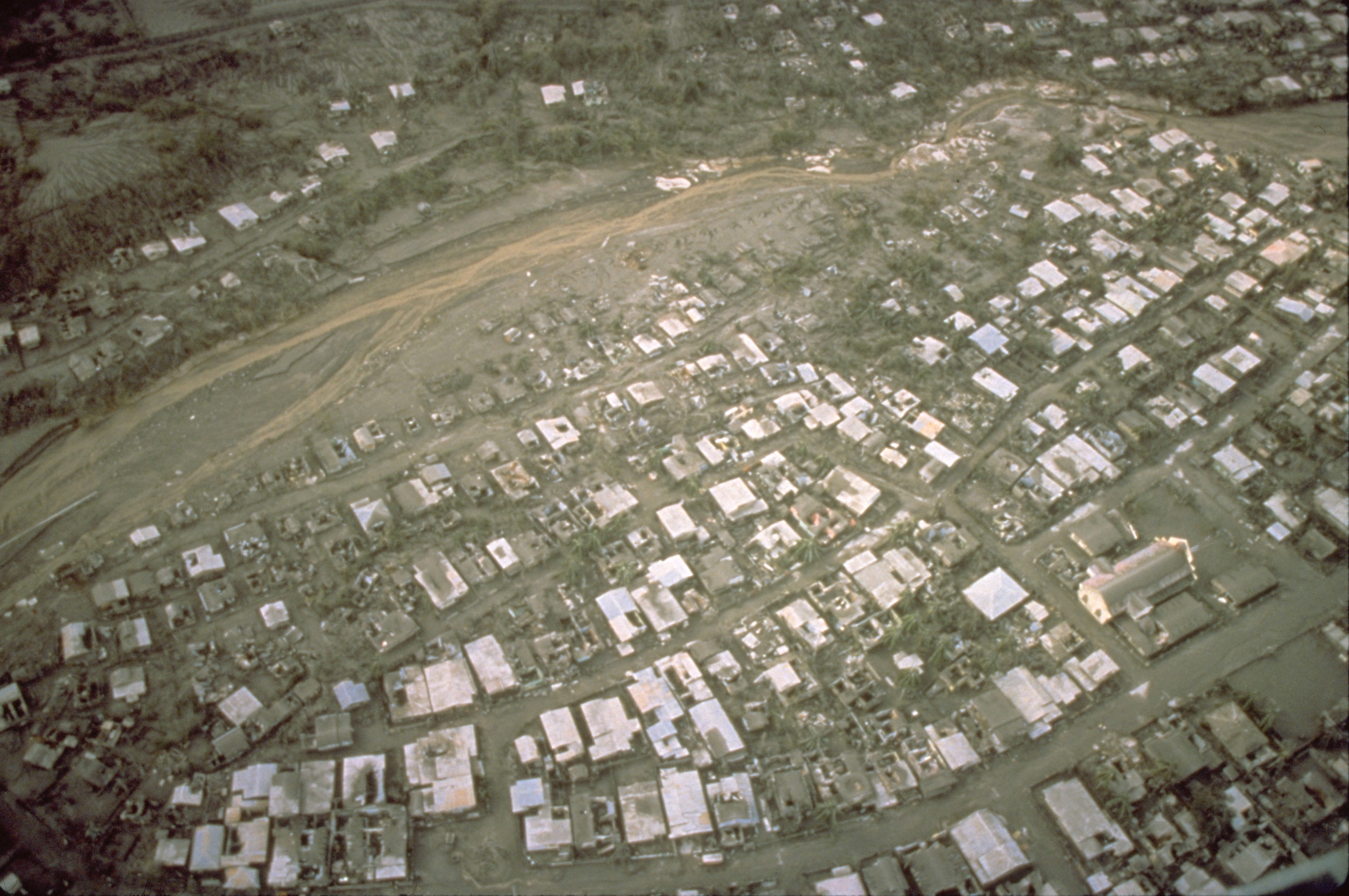
Aerial view of lahar damage and damage to roofs from tephra fall in Sapangbato, along Abacon River, south of Clark Air Base, June 22, 1991

Many reforestation projects were destroyed in the eruption, with a total area of 150 km^{2} (58 sq mi; 37,000 acres) valued at 125 million pesos destroyed. Agriculture was heavily disrupted, with 800 km^{2} (310 sq mi; 200,000 acres) of rice-growing farmland destroyed, and almost 800,000 head of livestock and poultry killed, destroying the livelihoods of thousands of farmers. The cost to agriculture of eruption effects was estimated to be 1.5 billion pesos.

Many farmers near Pinatubo began growing quick-ripening crops such as peanuts, cassava, and sweet potatoes, which could be harvested before the threat of lahar floods during the late-summer rainy season.

=== Local economic and social effects ===
In total, 364 communities and 2.1 million people were affected by the eruption, with livelihoods and houses being damaged and destroyed. More than 8,000 houses were destroyed, and a further 73,000 were damaged. In addition to the severe damage sustained by these communities, roads and communications were damaged or destroyed by pyroclastic surges and lahar floods throughout the areas surrounding the volcano. Total losses in 1991 and 1992 alone were estimated at 10.6 and 1.2 billion pesos, respectively, including damage to public infrastructure estimated at 3.8 billion pesos (~ US$92 million, or $175 million today, adjusted for inflation). School classes for thousands of children was temporarily suspended by the destruction of schools in the eruption.

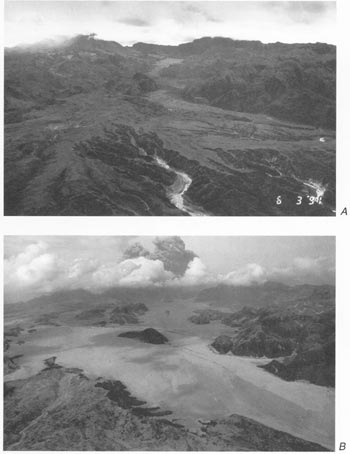
Before and after the eruption: a river valley filled in by pyroclastic flow deposits

The eruption of Pinatubo severely hampered the economic development of the surrounding areas. The gross regional domestic product of the Pinatubo area accounted for about 10% of the total Philippine gross domestic product. The GRDP had been growing at 5% annually before the eruption but fell by more than 3% from 1990 to 1991. In 1991, damage to crops and property was estimated at $374 million (or $711 million today), to which continuing lahar floods added a further $69 million (or $127 million today) in 1992. In total, 42 percent of the cropland around the volcano was affected by more lahar floods, dealing a severe blow to the agricultural economy in the region.

=== Lahars ===
Since the eruption, each heavy rain has brought massive lahars from the volcano, displacing thousands of people and inflicting extensive damage to buildings and infrastructure costing billions to repair. Funds were spent constructing dikes and dams to control post-eruption lahar flows.

Several important river systems stem from Mount Pinatubo, the major rivers being the Tarlac, Abacan, Pasig-Potrero, Sta. Lucia, Bucao, Santo Tomas, Maloma, Tanguay, Ashley and Kileng rivers. Before the eruption, these river systems were important ecosystems, but the eruption filled many valleys with deep pyroclastic deposits. Since 1991, the rivers have been clogged with sediment, and the valleys have seen frequent lahars which continued for years after the eruption. Studies show that the river systems will take decades to recover from the June 1991 eruption.

On September 3, 1995, a lahar buried San Guillermo Parish Church in Bacolor, Pampanga to half its 12-metre (39 ft) height.

=== Military impact ===
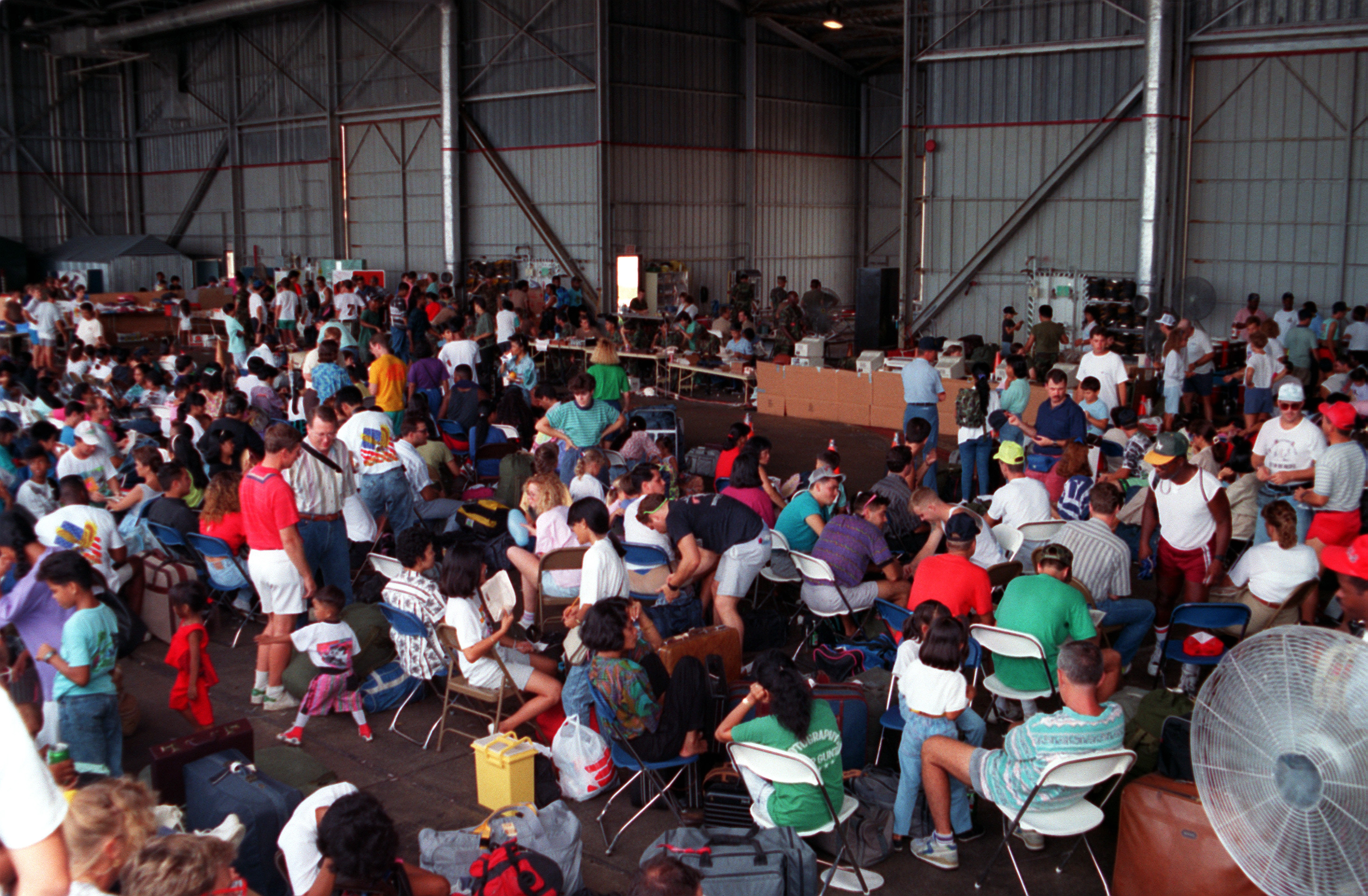
Evacuees from Mount Pinatubo at Andersen Air Force Base in Guam

The United States Air Force initiated a massive airlift effort to evacuate American service members and their families from the two affected bases during and immediately following the eruption, named Operation Fiery Vigil. The first sea-based evacuations departed June 16 from Alava Wharf, Naval Base Subic Bay aboard USS Rodney M. Davis, USS Curts, and USS Arkansas, all of whom were in port or who had made port immediately after the initial plume of June 12. Each made two passages from Subic Bay transporting evacuees to Cebu City, Visayas, for subsequent transport by USAF units to Andersen AFB, Guam.

Additional maritime evacuations began several days later with the arrival of the USS Abraham Lincoln battle group, USS Midway, and USS Peleliu. Most personnel were initially relocated to Guam, Okinawa and the U.S. state of Hawaii, although some returned to the continental United States. Clark Air Base was ultimately abandoned by the United States military because of the eruption, and Subic Bay reverted to Philippine control in November 1992 following the breakdown of lease negotiations and the expiration of the Military Bases Agreement of 1947.

=== Global environmental effects ===
The powerful eruption of such an enormous volume of lava and ash injected significant quantities of aerosols and dust into the stratosphere. Sulfur dioxide oxidized in the atmosphere to produce a haze of sulfuric acid droplets, which gradually spread throughout the stratosphere over the year following the eruption. The injection of aerosols into the stratosphere is thought to have been the largest since the 1883 eruption of Krakatoa, with a total mass of SO_{2} of about 1.7 million t (1.9 million short tons) being injected—the largest volume ever recorded by modern instruments (see chart and figure).

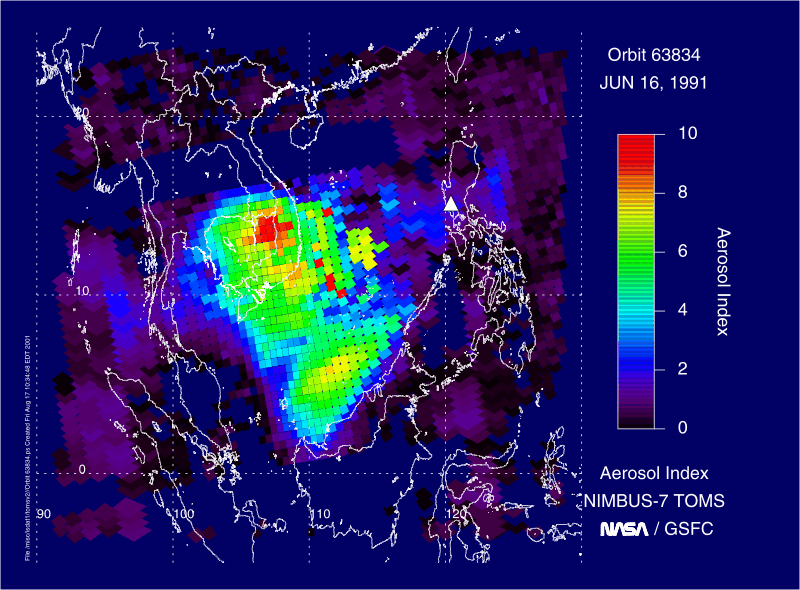
Satellite measurements of ash and aerosol emissions from Mount Pinatubo

This very large stratospheric injection resulted in a reduction in the normal amount of sunlight reaching the Earth's surface by roughly 10% (see figure). A volcanic cooling ensued, leading to a decrease in Northern Hemisphere average temperatures of 0.5–0.6 °C (0.9–1.1 °F) and a global decrease of about 0.4 °C (0.7 °F). The 1991 eruption also caused the "Summer that Wasn't" in 1992. The extremity of this volcanic cooling has been called into question by some, however, with a more conservative estimate of a 0.2 °C decrease in global temperatures for 13 months also being given.

At the same time, the temperature in the stratosphere rose to several degrees higher than normal, due to the absorption of radiation by the aerosol. The stratospheric cloud from the eruption persisted in the atmosphere for three years. The eruption, while not directly responsible, may have played a part in the formation of the 1991 Perfect Storm, 1991 Halloween blizzard and 1993 Storm of the Century.

The eruption had a significant effect on ozone levels in the atmosphere, causing a large increase in the destruction rate of ozone. Ozone levels at middle latitudes reached their lowest recorded levels, while in the Southern Hemisphere winter of 1992, the ozone hole over Antarctica reached its largest ever size until then, with the fastest-recorded ozone depletion rates. The eruption of Mount Hudson in Chile in August 1991 also contributed to southern hemisphere ozone destruction, with measurements showing a sharp decrease in ozone levels at the tropopause when the aerosol clouds from Pinatubo and Hudson arrived.

Another noticeable effect of the dust in the atmosphere was the appearance of lunar eclipses. Normally even at mid-eclipse, the Moon is still visible although much dimmed, whereas in the year following the Pinatubo eruption, the Moon was hardly visible at all during eclipses, due to much greater absorption of sunlight by dust in the atmosphere. It has also been suggested that excess cloud condensation nuclei from the eruption were responsible for the "Great Flood of 1993" in the Midwestern United States.

=== Aeta people ===
The Aeta people were the hardest hit by the eruption. After the areas surrounding the volcano were declared safe, many Aetas returned to their old villages only to find them destroyed by pyroclastic and lahar deposits. Some were able to return to their former way of life, but most moved instead to government-organized resettlement areas. Conditions on these were poor, with each family receiving only small plots of land not ideal for growing crops. Many Aeta found casual labor working for lowland farmers, and overall Aeta society became much more fragmented, and reliant on and integrated with lowland culture.

== Humanitarian aid ==
Humanitarian aid received due to the eruption is as follows:

=== Local ===
==== Government ====
The government implemented several rehabilitative and reconstructive programs. Projects that will help deal with the aftermath brought about by lahar were also implemented. Among these is the construction of mega dikes. Moreover, to hasten the implementation of the basic services for the afflicted, private sectors, including the NGOs, took part in offering relief. They provided support and coordinated on the services that were deemed lacking from the side of the government.

1. Resettlement

For whom	Amount (in pesos)
Highlanders (Aetas)	349 million
Lowlanders	1.689 billion

2. Livelihood programs focused on agriculture and industry (quick-generating income opportunities to affected families)

Program	Amount (in pesos)
Bamboo Development Project	80 million
Agricultural Rehabilitation Program	197.4 million
Agricultural Development Program	615 million
Productivity Centers	1.12 Billion
Integrated Cattle Fattening Program	120 million
Integrated Poultry Livelihood Program	40 million
Deep Sea Fishing	58 million
Financing Programs	3.718 billion

3. Basic social services

Program	Amount (in pesos)
Relief Services	370.5 million
Health and Nutrition Service	367 million
Agricultural Development Program	615 million

4. Infrastructure rehabilitation and reconstruction

Program	Amount (in pesos)
River Systems Rehabilitation and Improvement Project	2.9 billion
Reconstruction and Rehabilitation of Roads and Bridges	1.5 billion
Development of Alternate Routes in Capas-Botolan Road	537 million
San Fernando Dinalupihan Road	1.4 billion
Angeles-Porac-Floridablanca Dinalupihan Road	169 million
Rehabilitation of Damaged Schools and Public Buildings	982 million
Mobile Health Facilities	40 million
Repair and Rehabilitation of Damaged National and Communal Irrigation Systems	228.6 million
Rehabilitation of Railway Facilities	70 million

==== Asian Disaster Reduction Center ====
The Asian Disaster Reduction Center was founded in Kobe, Hyogo prefecture, in 1998, with a mission to improve disaster resilience of its fifty member countries, to build safe communities, and to create a society where there is an achievable sustainable development. The center works to build and establish networks among countries through many programs such as personnel exchanges in this field. The Center addresses this issue from a global perspective in cooperation with various UN agencies and international organizations including the International Strategy for Disaster Reduction (ISDR), the Office for the Coordination of Humanitarian Affairs (OCHA), the United Nations Educational, Scientific and Cultural Organization (UNESCO), the United Nations Economic and Social Commission for Asia and the Pacific (ESCAP), the World Meteorological Organization (WMO), and the World Health Organization Regional Office for the Western Pacific (WHO/WPRO). The Asian Disaster Reduction Center focuses mainly on the following forms of aid:

===== Resettlement =====
After the eruption, many of the homes were destroyed and many of the areas affected by lahar were deemed uninhabitable. There was need to resettle the people particularly the Aetas and lowlanders. Resettlement for these two needs to take into consideration the factors of their socio-cultural and socioeconomic differences.

Some of the Pinatubo resettlement areas built in Pampanga, Tarlac, and Zambales

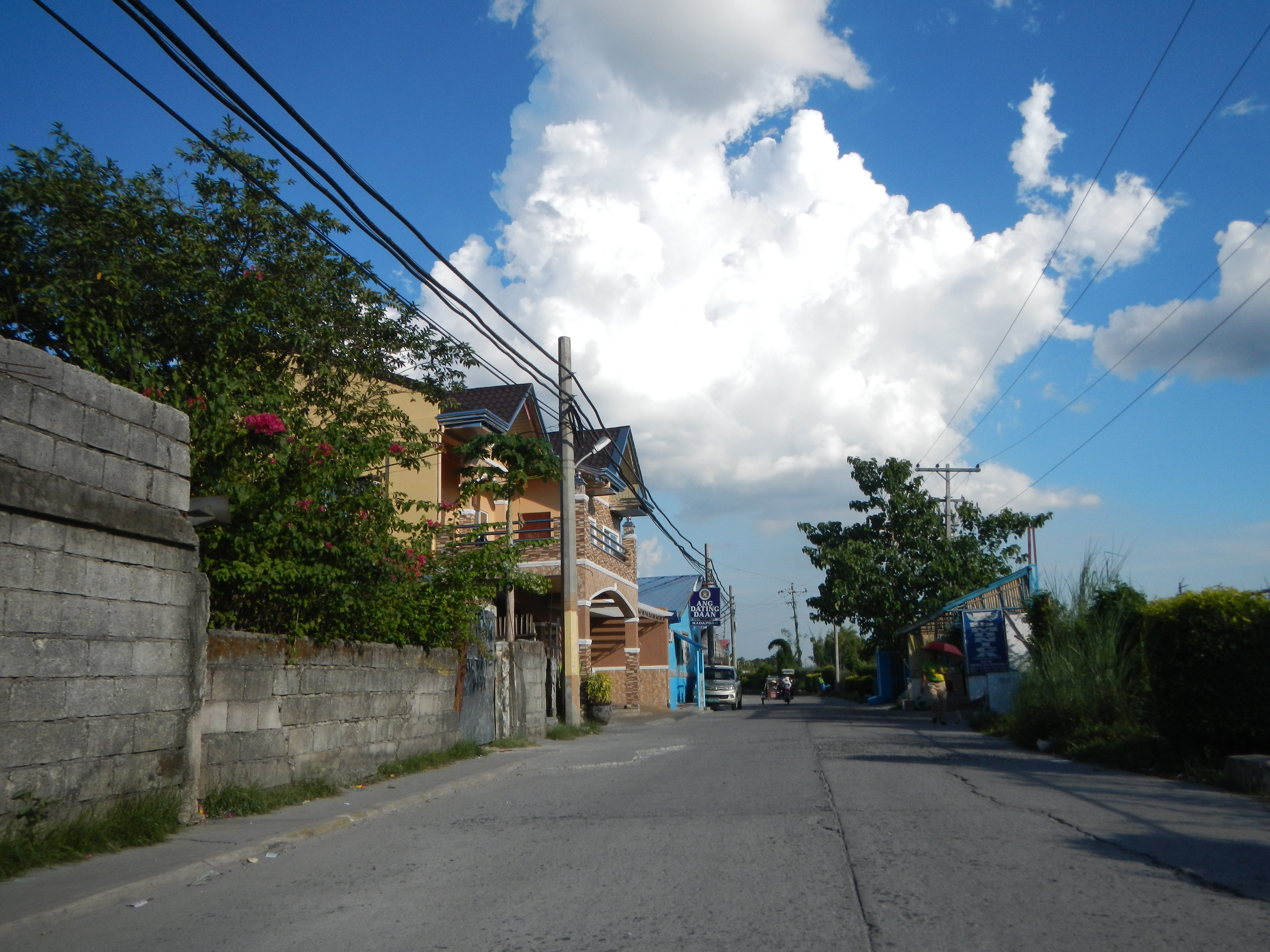
Madapdap Resettlement Center in Mabalacat, Pampanga

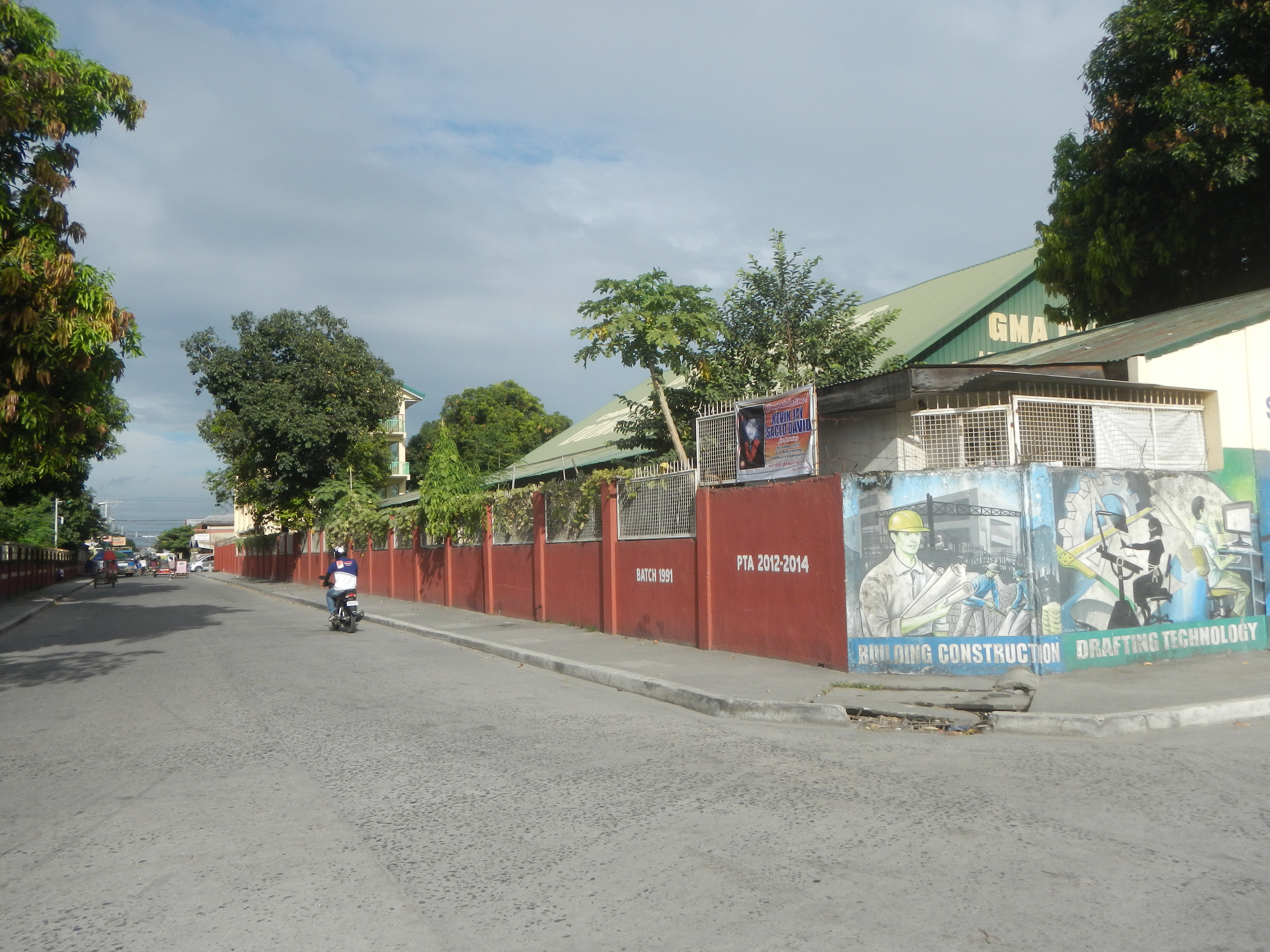
Bulaon Resettlement Center in San Fernando, Pampanga

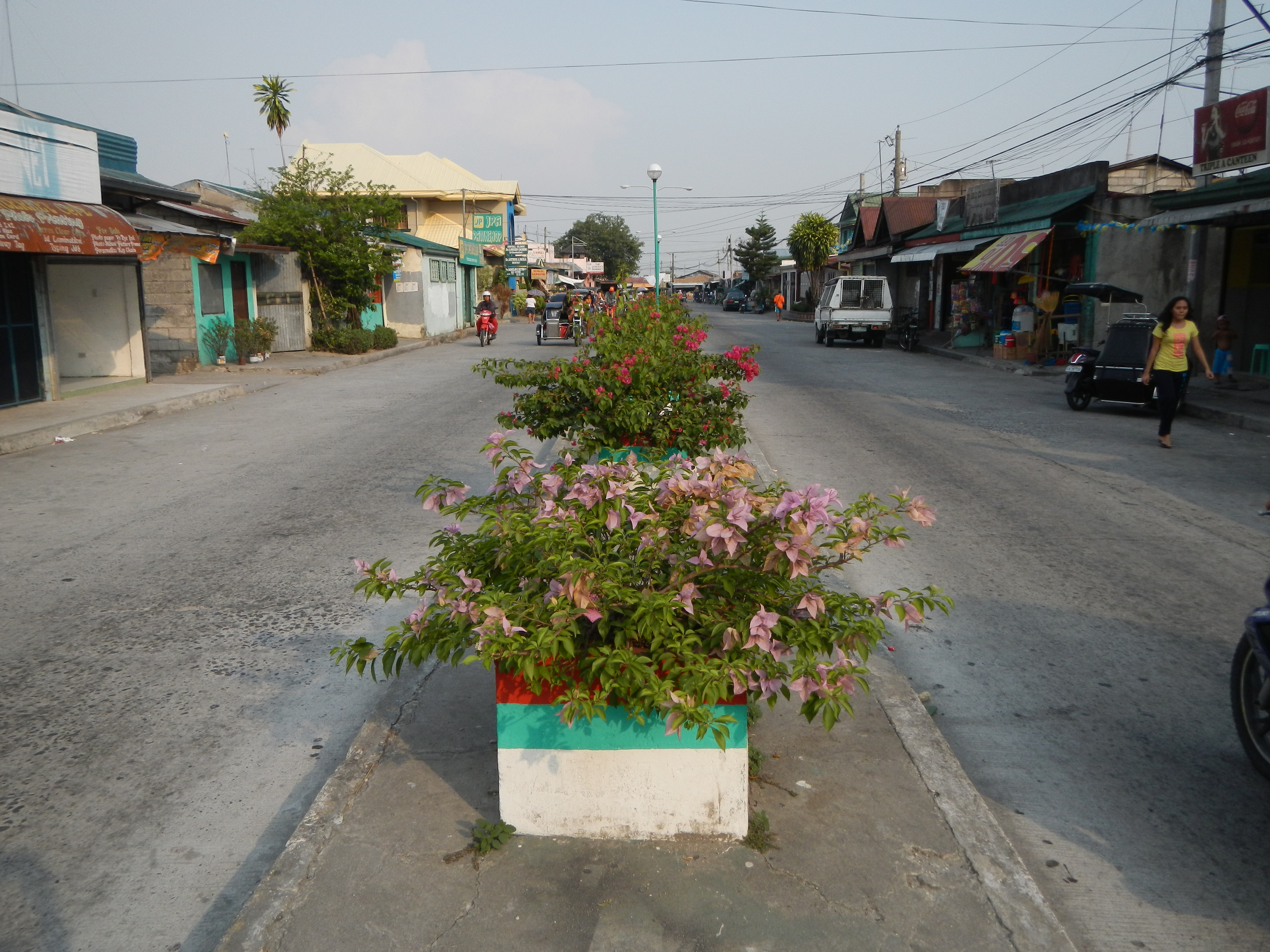
Pandacaqui Resettlement Center in Mexico, Pampanga

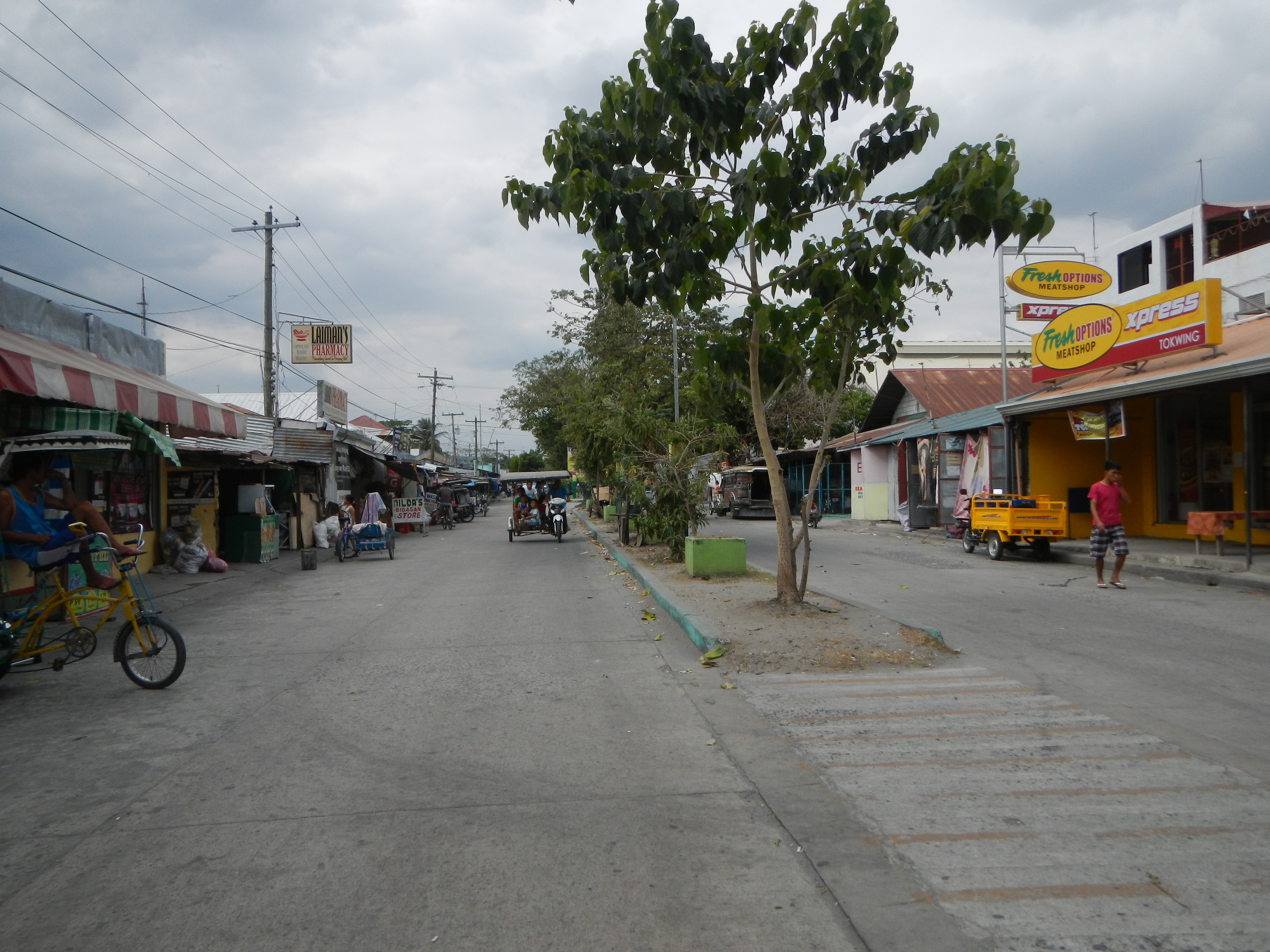
Pio Model Community in Porac, Pampanga

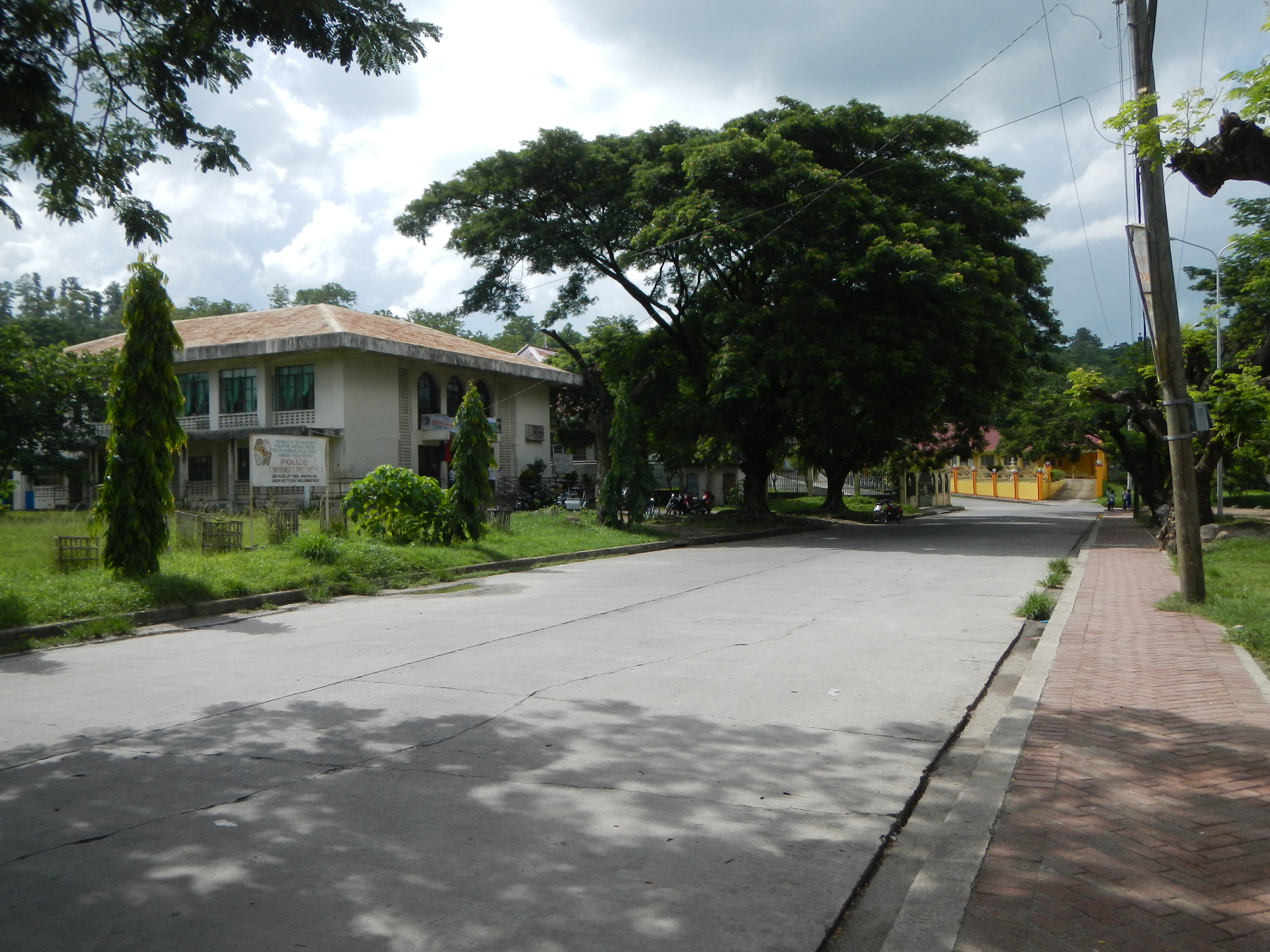
Dapdap Resettlement Center in Bamban, Tarlac

===== Livelihood =====
Faced with the destruction of many of the farmlands and the displacement of farmers and other workers the government had to search for a long-term solution to address the issue. Agricultural-based industries were also greatly affected. The closure of Clark Air base also raised an issue of finding short-term livelihoods and the need to use the base lands to cushion the repercussions of the worker's displacement.

===== Social services =====
The destruction brought about by the incident pressured social service sectors to continue their efforts in assisting in terms of health, social welfare, and education. The services offered are not limited to the victims within the evacuation centers but also offered to the others affected. While the event happened during the opening of a school year, classes were needed to be pushed back as school facilities were destroyed. Providing resettlement for the evacuees was also a major concern. Social services were also provided in the prospective resettlement areas to prepare the victims when settling down.

===== Infrastructure =====
Destruction of many infrastructures was mostly due to the wet ash after the explosion. The region's roads, bridges, public buildings, facilities, communication, and structures for river and flood control were some of the great concerns of the government. A need to establish measures for the flash floods and the threat caused by lahar also became an imperative demand to the government.

===== Land use and environmental management =====
The aftereffects of the eruption damaged not only man-made structures but also farmlands, forestlands, and watersheds. River systems and the overall environment of the affected region are also heavily damaged by the heavy lahar flow. To address this careful replanning of the land area region is necessary.

===== Science and technology =====
This event showed the need to engage in scientific studies to reassess the current policies and knowledge on areas with risk of eruption. Studies should also be allocated on a possible application for the ash fall for industrial and commercial purposes. The significance of this concern affects both the government and private sectors.

=== International ===
Even before the Philippine government officially appealed for international assistance, the Office of U.S. Foreign Disaster Assistance (USAID/OFDA) shipped shelter material for victims of the floods and lahars in late July 1992. In the following month, they provided $375 000 to be used for relief and rehabilitation projects. The Department of Social Welfare and Development had claimed during an informal donors' meeting with representatives from mostly international agencies who compose the donor community that the national government was still well equipped and had sufficient resources to aid the victims. The UN-Disaster Management Team (DMT) and the United Nations' Department of Humanitarian Affairs/United Nations Disaster Relief Organization (DHA/UNDRO) continued cooperating with the national government to monitor the situation and formulate ideas for further assistance.

It was not until then-President Fidel V. Ramos had declared the affected provinces and areas to be in a state of emergency that the national government officially requested for international assistance and for aid in projects for rehabilitation and relief provisions in the aforementioned areas. In response to this, the DHA/UNDRO reached out to the international community to respond to the appeal, and continued their operations, coordinating with the government.

Among the countries that extended humanitarian relief assistance were Australia, Belgium, Canada, China, Denmark, Finland, France, Germany, India, Indonesia, Italy, Japan, Malaysia, Malta, Myanmar, the Netherlands, New Zealand, Norway, Saudi Arabia, Singapore, South Korea, Spain, Sweden, Thailand, the United Kingdom, and the United States. International organizations including the United Nations Development Programme (UNDP), the Office of the United Nations Disaster Relief Coordinator (UNDRO, predecessor to the current (United Nations Office for the Coordination of Humanitarian Affairs or OCHA), the United Nations Children's Emergency Fund (UNICEF), the World Food Programme (WFP), and the World Health Organization (WHO) also offered assistance. Relief assistance from these organizations and countries were in the form of either cash donation or relief items such as food packs, medicines, and shelter materials.

==== United Nations ====
Contributions made by the different systems of the United Nations (UN) are as follows:

UN system	Type of contribution	Amount (in USD)
United Nations Development Program (UNDP)	Cash for local purposes	50,000
United Nations International Children's Emergency Fund (UNICEF)	Cash from regular programme funds	72,000
United Nations International Children's Emergency Fund (UNICEF)	Cash from general resources	150,000
World Health Organization (WHO)	One emergency health kit	10,000
World Food Programme (WFP)	Food items	50,000

Contributions made by participating countries in the UN are as follows:

Country	Type of contribution	Amount (in USD)
Australia	Food, relief goods, medicines, and medicinal supplies	7,142
Australia	Cash (AU$250,000) through Department of Social Welfare and Development (DSWD)	178,571
Denmark	Cash (DK 250,000)	45,872
Germany	Cash (DM 100,000) through non-government organization (NGO)	70,922
Germany	Cash (DM 100,000) through German Embassy)	70,922
Netherlands	Cash through UNICEF	675,000
Spain	40 tents, 100 kits of kitchen utensils (including air transport)	54,644
Sweden	Cash (SEK 500,000) through non-government organization	97,087
United Kingdom	Cash through SCF/Philippine Business for Social Progress (NGO)	89,108
United States	Cash	25,000
United States	1,000 boxes plastic sheeting (including air transport)	726,800
United States	Cash through Philippine Business for Social Progress	189,000
United States	Cash through Jamie Ongpin Foundation	175,000
United States	Cash through A. Soriano Foundation	262,500

==== Others ====
Some specific projects under the auspices of the DPWH, which were made possible by foreign assistance, included:

- ADB-funded Mt. Pinatubo Damage Rehabilitation Project
- German Bank for Reconstruction-funded Mt. Pinatubo Emergency Aide Project
- Japan International Cooperation Agency (JICA)-funded Mt. Pinatubo Relief and Rehab Project
- USAID-funded United States Army Corps of Engineers' Mt. Pinatubo recovery action
- Dutch-funded dredging of the Pasac-Guagua-San Fernando Waterway
- Overseas Economic Cooperation Fund (OECF)-funded Pinatubo Hazard Urgent Mitigation Project
- German Centrum for International Migration (CIM)-funded technical assistance for Mount Pinatubo Emergency-PMO
- JICA-funded grant aid for water supply in Mt. Pinatubo resettlement areas and study on flood and mudflow control for Sacobia Bamban/Abacan Rivers
- IBRD-funded technical assistance for Mt. Pinatubo and Rehabilitation Works
- Swiss Disaster Relief-funded technical assistance for Mt. Pinatubo Rehabilitation
- JBIC Yen Loan Package-funded Pinatubo hazard Urgent Mitigation Project

== In popular culture ==
The eruption is featured in volcano and disaster documentaries:

- Nova: "In the Path of a Killer Volcano" (PBS, 1993, also broadcast on Channel 4 in the United Kingdom under the Equinox documentary strand)
- Volcano: Nature's Inferno (National Geographic, 1997)
- Pinoy True Stories: Red Alert (ABS-CBN, 2014–15)
- Earth's Fury (Anatomy of Disaster in the United States): "Volcano" (GRB Studios, 1997)
- Mega Disaster (NHNZ, 2006)
- Savage Earth: "Out of the Inferno" (PBS and ITV, 1998)
- The Amazing Video Collection: Natural Disasters (1996, direct-to-video)
- Limang Dekada: The GMA News 50th Anniversary Special (a television special produced by GMA News and Public Affairs during its 50th anniversary in 2010)
- Sa Mata ng Balita (a television special produced by ABS-CBN News and Current Affairs during its 50th anniversary in 2003)
- Surviving the Eruption at Pinatubo (National Geographic Channel, 2006)
- Volcano (1997 film, mentioned)
- Dante's Peak (1997 film, mentioned)
- Bayani (ABS-CBN)
- Volcano: Ring of Fire (Discovery Channel, 1997)
- Pinatubo: Pagbangon Mula sa Abo (ABS-CBN, 2011)
- Pinatubo Tragedy (Journeyman Pictures/ABC Australia, 2000)

In the novel Termination Shock, Pinatubo is a somewhat prominent plot point due to the long-term environmental impact of releasing sulfur dioxide inspiring the geoengineering project in the novel.

== See also ==
- List of active volcanoes in the Philippines
- List of volcanic eruptions 1500–2000
- List of volcanic eruptions by death toll
- Volcanic winter (a recent one having been caused by this eruption)
