= Malolos station =

Malolos
- New station under construction in 2026

General information
- Location: MacArthur Highway, Catmon; Malolos, Bulacan; Philippines
- Coordinates: 14°51′19″N 120°48′48″E
- Owner: Philippine National Railways
- Operator: Philippine National Railways
- Lines: Planned: North Commuter; Former: North Main Line
- Platforms: Island platform
- Tracks: 2

Construction
- Structure type: Elevated
- Architectural style: Bahay na bato (old station); Contemporary (new station)

Other information
- Status: Under construction
- Station code: ML

History
- Opened: March 24, 1891
- Rebuilt: 2020-ongoing
- Former names: Barasoain y Malolos

Future services
Preceding station	PNR	Following station
Calumpit towards Clark International Airport	NSCR Commuter	Guiguinto towards Calamba
Calumpit towards New Clark City	NSCR Commuter	Guiguinto towards Tutuban
Location
- Location within Bulacan Location within Luzon Location within Philippines

Malolos station is an under-construction elevated North–South Commuter Railway (NSCR) station located in Malolos, Bulacan, Philippines.

The station was part of the Philippine National Railways (PNR) North Main Line before its closure in the 1980s.

== History ==
Malolos station (Spanish: Estacion Ferrocaril de Malolos) was opened on March 24, 1891 as part of Ferrocaril de Manila-Dagupan. Services from Manila to Dagupan commenced on November 24, 1892. It was then named Estacion de Barasoain Y Malolos (lit. transl. Barasoain and Malolos Station), as it is located near the Malolos poblacion and the Barasoain Church.

In 1892, José Rizal alighted at the Old Malolos station to campaign at the Malolos Historic Town Center for the La Liga Filipina establishment. From 1898 to 1899, The Malolos Congress Delegates were also passengers of the Old station prefatory to the Philippine Declaration of Independence and their gathering at the Barasoain Church for the drafting of the Malolos Constitution.

The original station was destroyed in 1945 and was replaced with the current one. It was later abandoned after the ending of northbound services by the Philippine National Railways (PNR).

The station was to be rebuilt as a part of the Northrail project, which involved the upgrading of the existing single track to an elevated dual-track system, converting the rail gauge from narrow gauge to standard gauge, and linking Manila to Malolos in Bulacan and further on to Angeles City, Clark Special Economic Zone and Clark International Airport. The project commenced in 2007, but was repeatedly halted then discontinued in 2011.

It is currently being rebuilt as the terminus for the first phase of the North–South Commuter Railway. As part of the project, the old station will also be restored. Partial operations are slated to begin by 2027.

In February 2025, Bulacan SINEliksik Project of Provincial History, Arts, Culture and Tourism Office Head May Arlene Torres led the unveiling of the historical marker of the old station.

== Nearby landmarks ==
The station is located adjacent to the station include La Consolacion University Malolos, Bulacan Provincial Capitol, Bulacan State University, Puregold Jr. Malolos, and the Malolos City Terminal Hub. Located further are Barasoain Church, the Malolos City proper, and Camp General Alejo S. Santos.

== Gallery ==
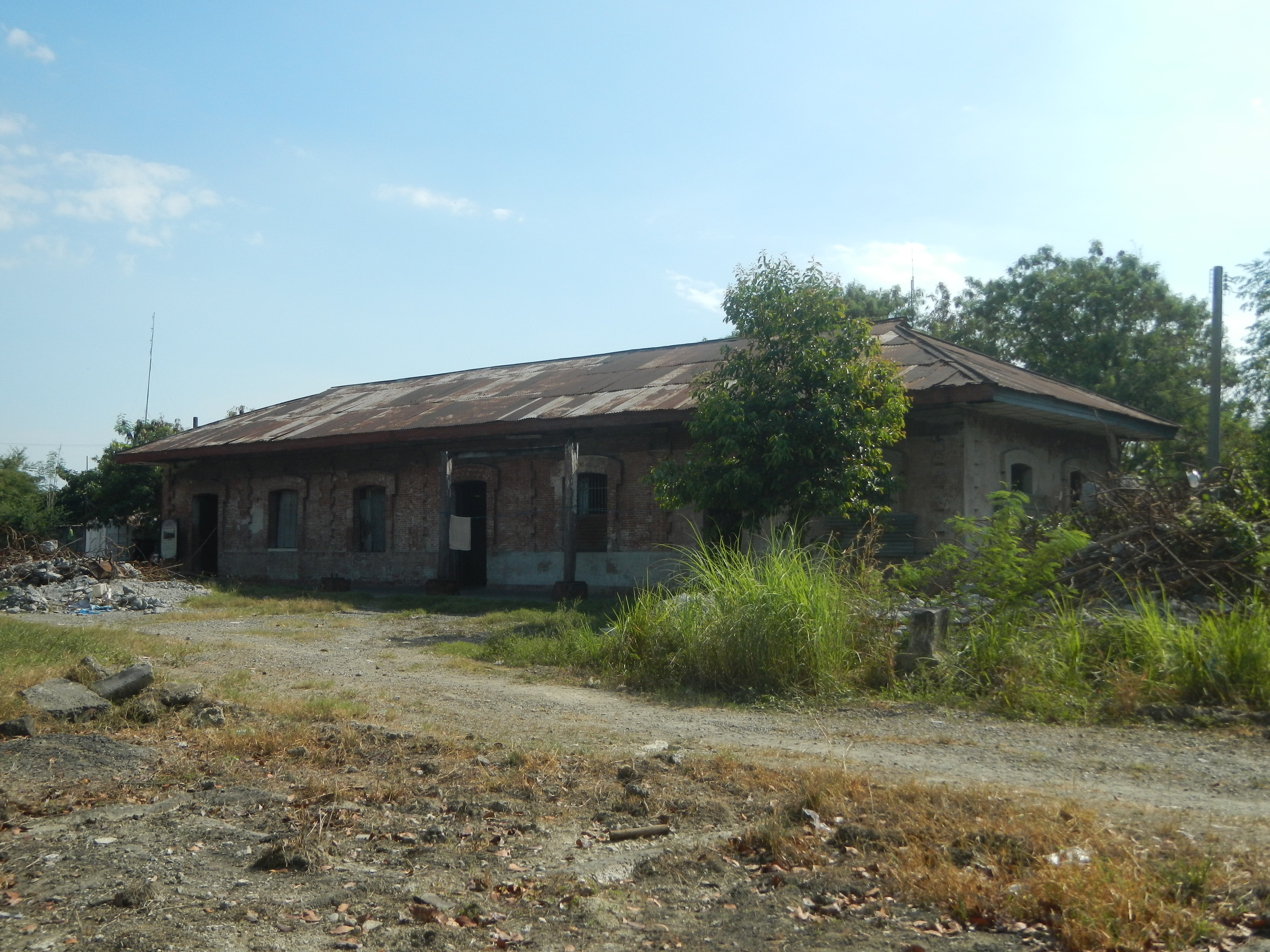
The old railway station

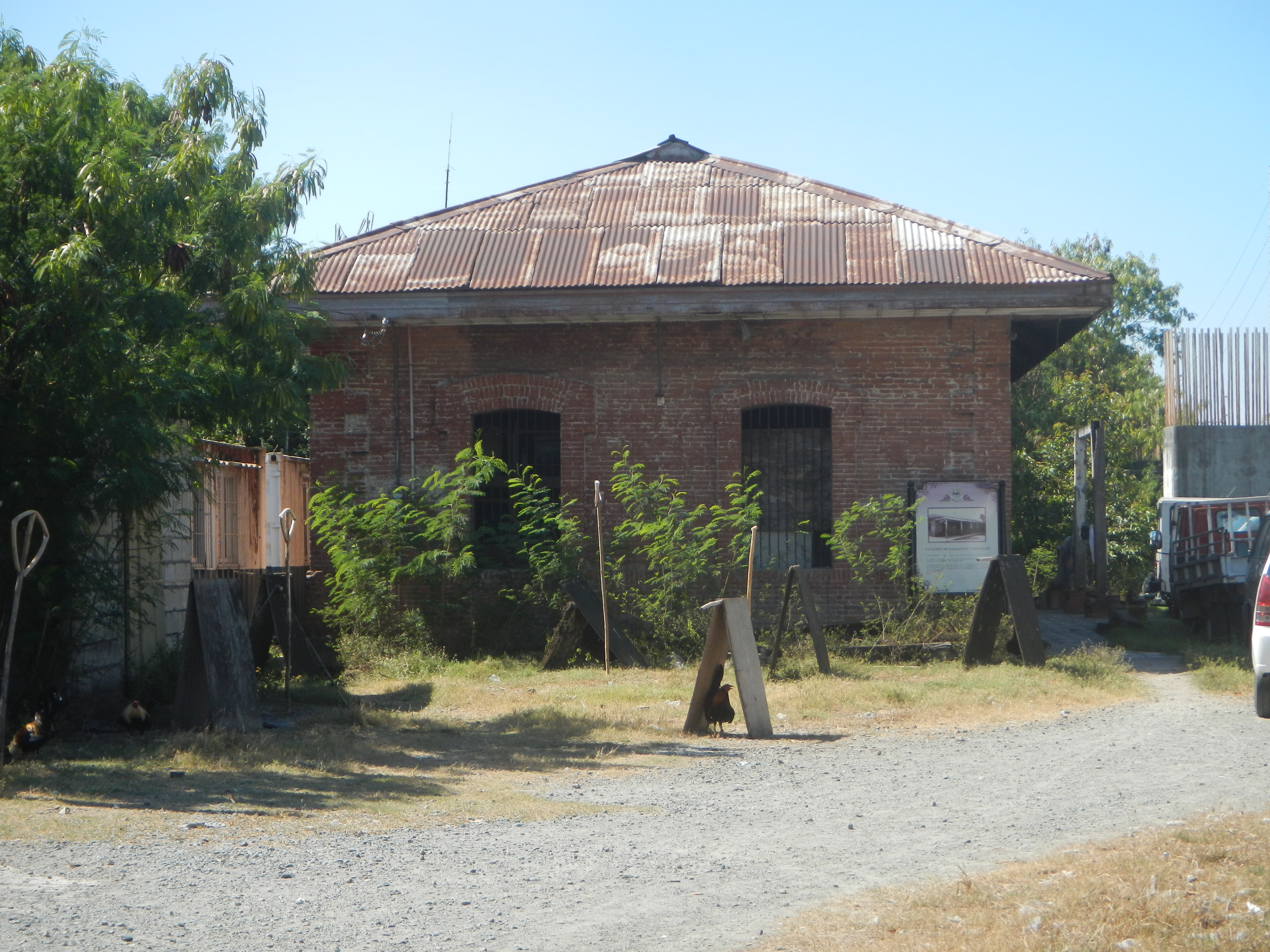
The rear of the station. Also partially seen is a column of the Northrail project.

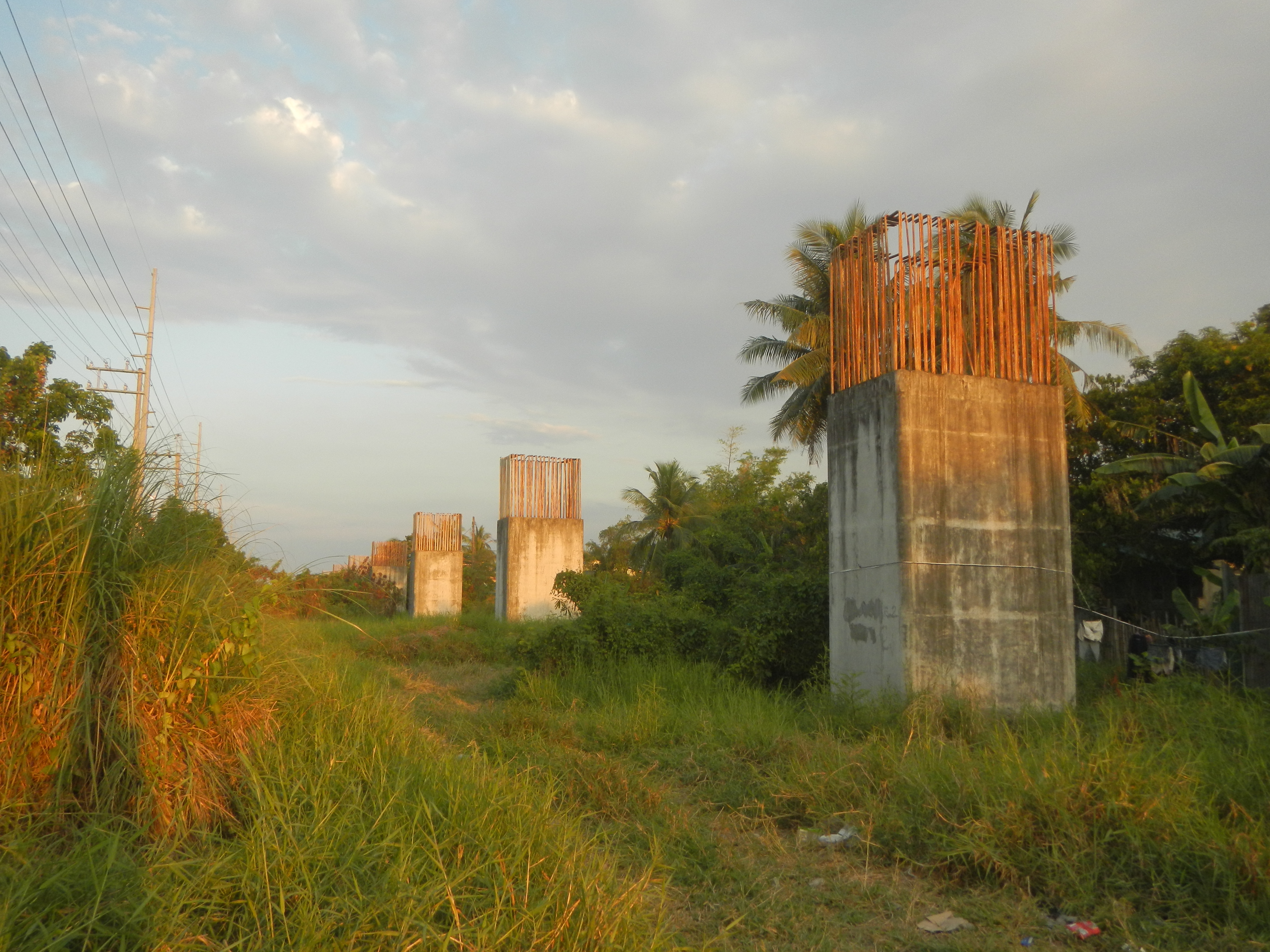
Abandoned columns of the Northrail project in Malolos.

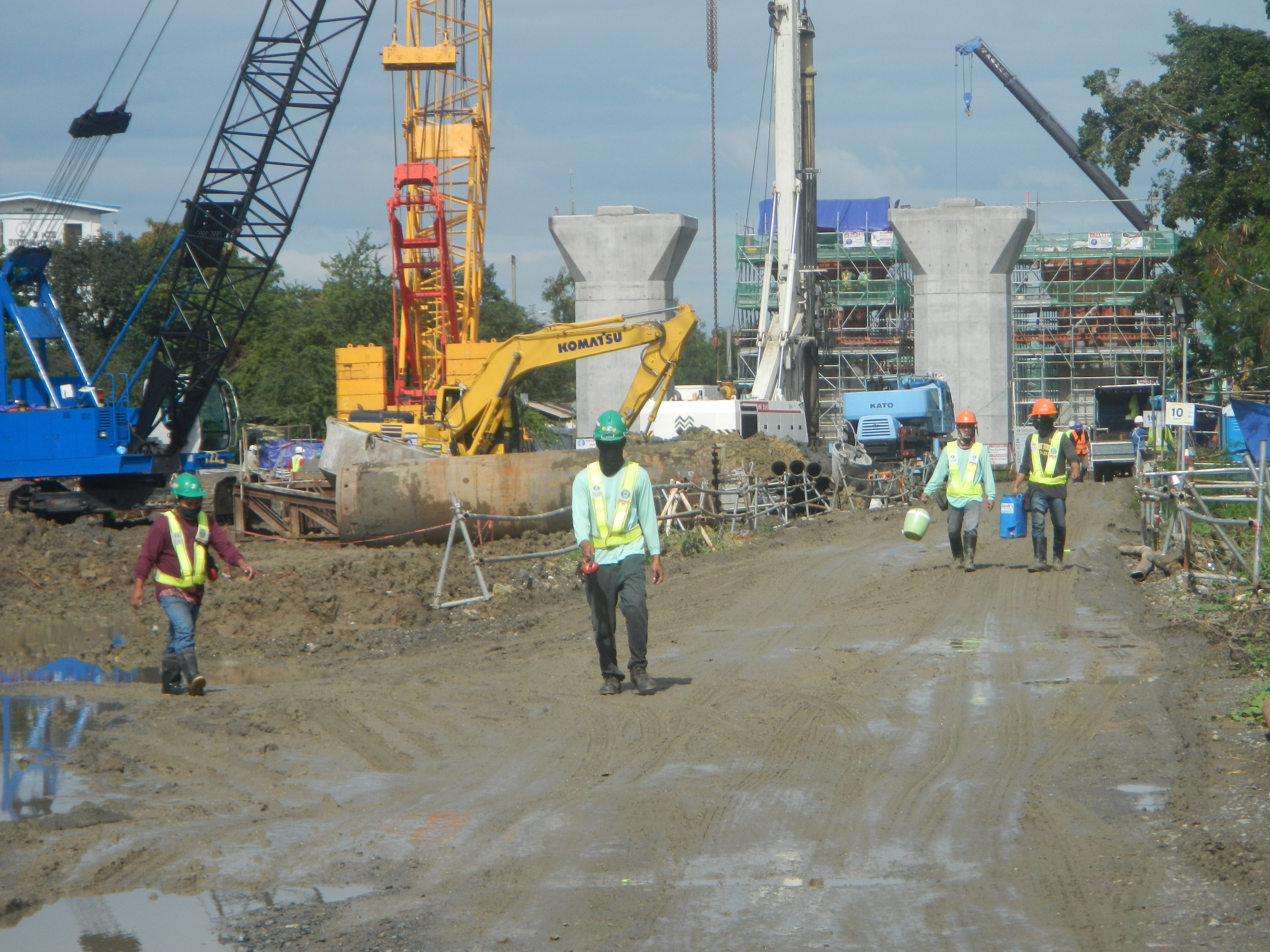
Construction of the railway station, December 2020

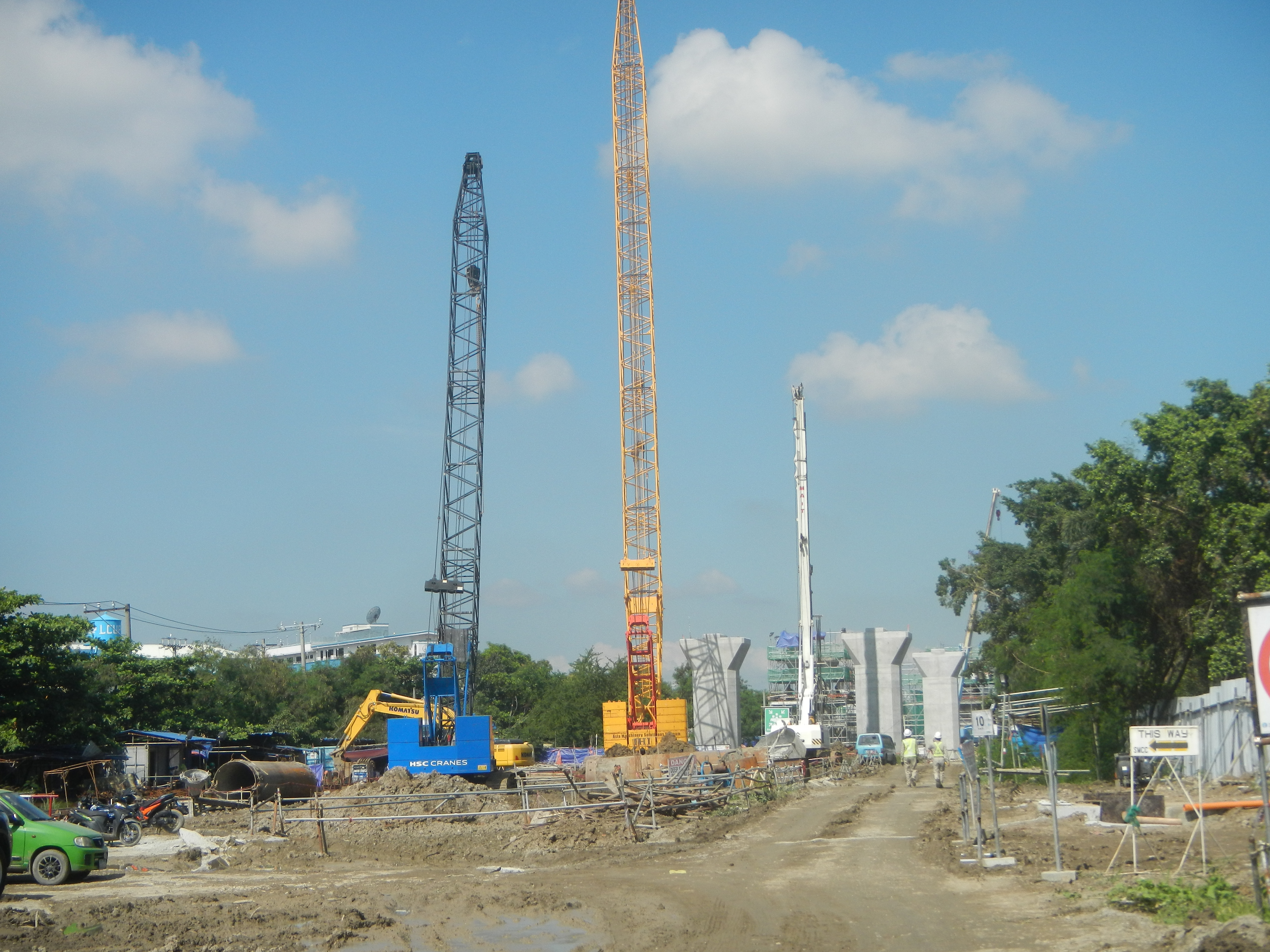

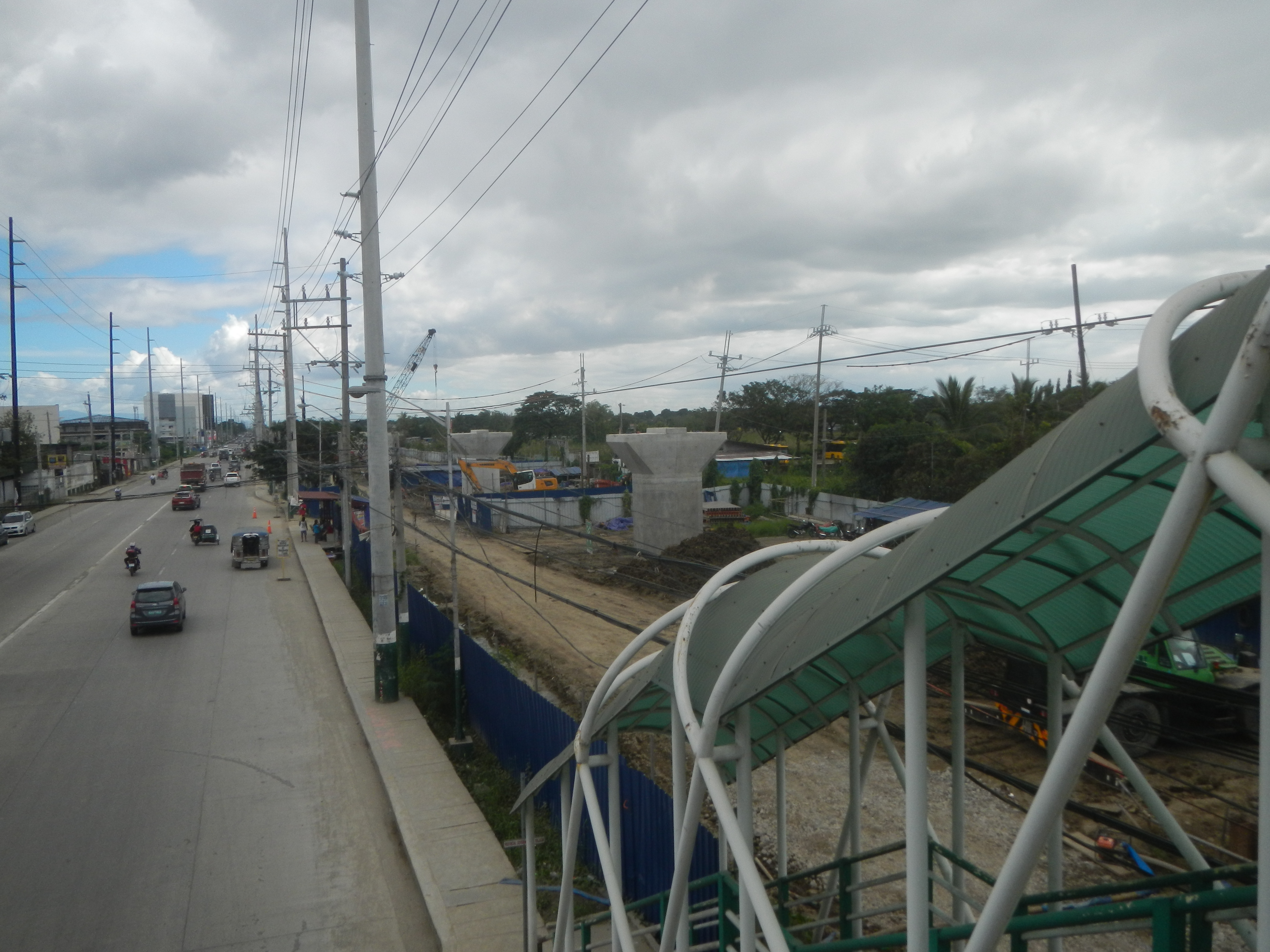
Construction of the viaduct leading to the station, December 2020
