= Mighty Corporation =

Tobacco company in the Philippines

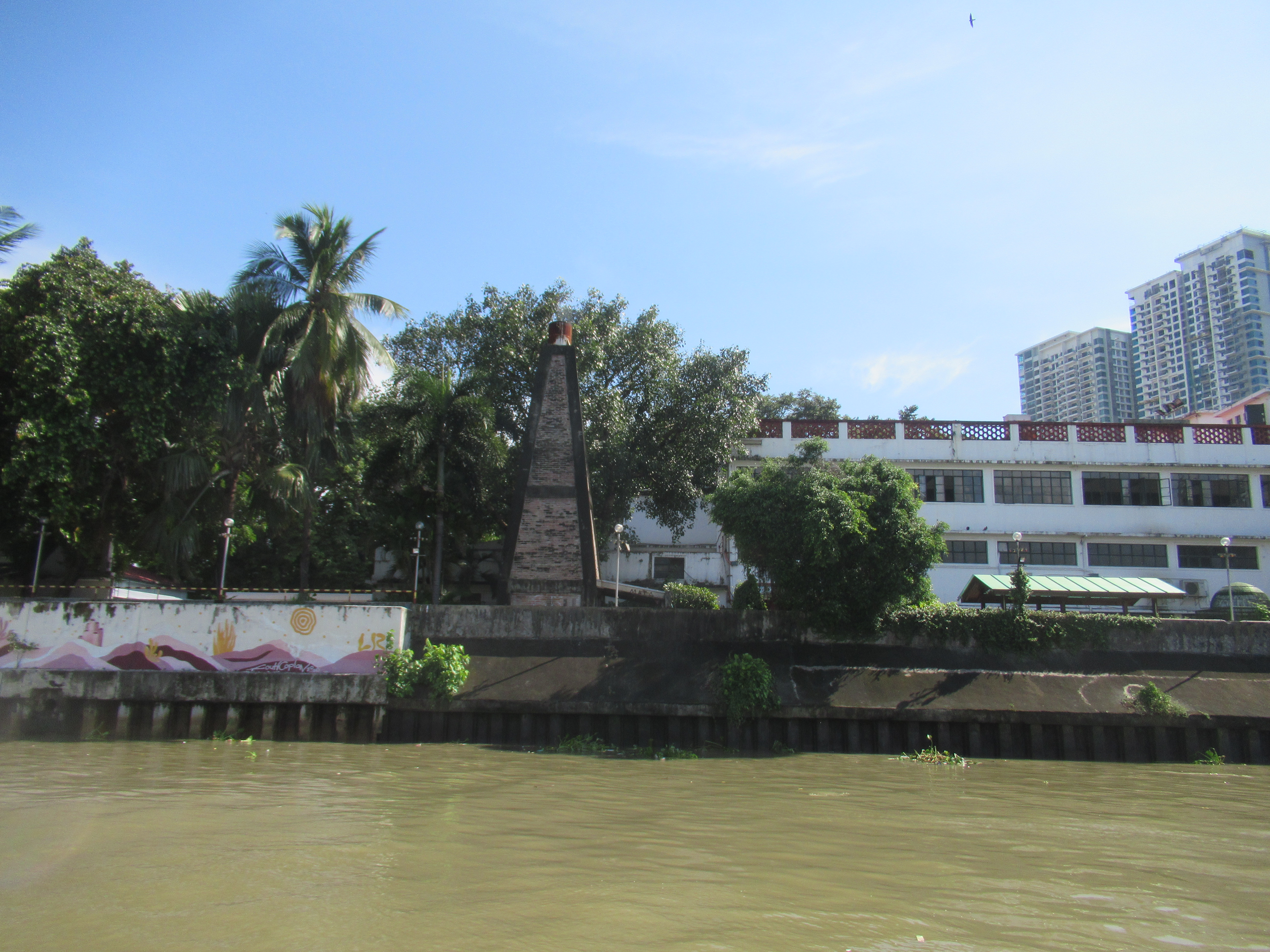
- Mighty Corporation headquarters and third factory in Makati, as seen from the Pasig River
- Native name: 皇冠煙廠
- Formerly: La Campana Fabrica de Tabacos, Inc.
- Type: Private
- Industry: Tobacco
- Founded: September 20, 1945; 81 years ago in Manila, Philippines
- Founder: Wong Chu King; Ong Lowa; Baa Dy; Ong Pay
- Headquarters: Makati, Philippines
- Area served: Philippines
- Key people: Oscar Barrientos (president)
- Products: Cigarettes
- Parent: Japan Tobacco

Mighty Corporation (Chinese: 皇冠煙廠) is a Filipino corporation and was the second largest cigarette manufacturer in the Philippines from 2010 to 2017. On September 8, 2017, Japan Tobacco acquired Mighty Corporation's cigarette business in the amount of ₱46.8 billion ($936 million), paving the way for the full payment of ₱30 billion to the Philippine government as part of the agreement for Mighty Corporation to settle its unpaid tax liabilities.

== History ==
On September 20, 1945, the company was established as La Campana Fabrica de Tabacos, Inc. by cigarette salesman Wong Chu King and partners Ong Lowa, Baa Dy, and Ong Pay. It started with a small cigarette factory along Tayabas (now Yuseco) Street in Manila, producing a type of native cigarette known as "matamis" (sweet blend). In 1948, a second factory was built along Pasong Tamo (now Chino Roces Avenue) in Makati, Rizal. The company later purchased a 1.7-hectare (4.2-acre) plot of land in 1951 for a third factory along Sultana Street, also in Makati, which now serves as the company's headquarters. In 1963, a facility for tobacco threshing and redrying was constructed in Malolos, Bulacan, where the company's processing plant was later established.

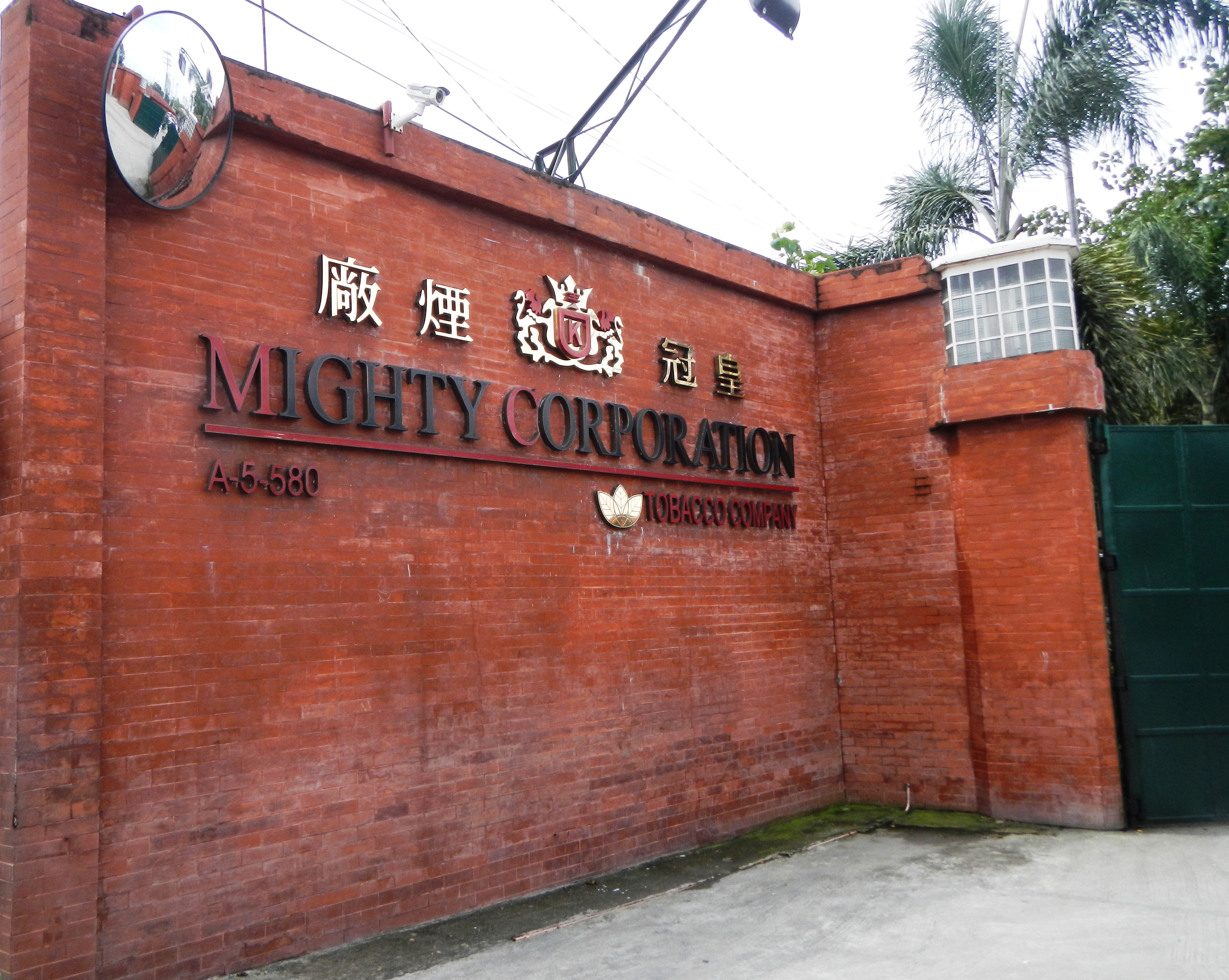
Gates of the Mighty Corporation plant in Malolos, Bulacan

In 1985, the company changed its name to Mighty Corporation and acquired the trademarks of rival Alhambra Industries, Inc. in 1993.

In 2001, the company entered into a cigarette manufacturing agreement with rival Sterling Tobacco Corporation to produce the latter's brands. In 2004, the company entered into a cigarette manufacturing agreement with the Philip Morris Philippines as the latter had acquired the trademarks of Sterling Tobacco Corporation.

The company increased its market share from 3 percent in 2012 to nearly 20 percent in 2013 as a result of consumer down-trading from premium (Marlboro, Lucky Strike, Winston) to low-end brands (Mighty, Fortune). The company endured accusations by rival PMFTC since the implementation of Republic Act 10351, more commonly known as the "Sin Tax Law", in 2012.

In 2014, the company was engaged in talks with British American Tobacco (BAT), the smallest player in the Philippine tobacco market, to explore partnership options.

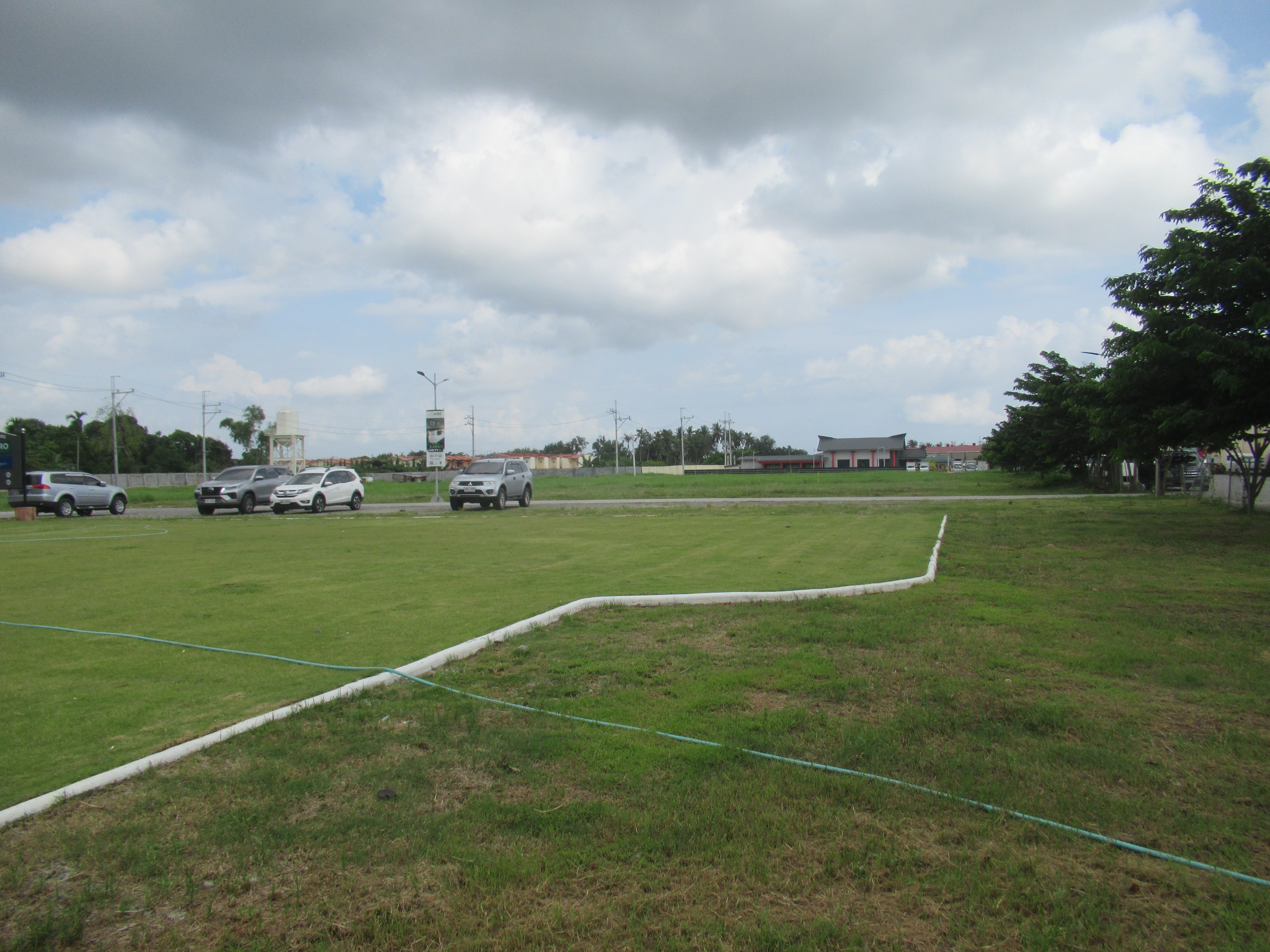
AcroCity Guiguinto, Bulacan

In 2017, Mighty Corporation completed the sale of its cigarette business to Japan Tobacco in the amount of ₱46.8 billion. The transaction included the company's trademarks, intellectual properties, sales and distribution network, manufacturing equipment and inventories. It also resulted to the domestic manufacturer's tax payment amounting to ₱40 billion - the largest amount paid in Philippine history by any corporation. The proceeds were to be used to boost the Rodrigo Duterte administration's infrastructure program.

== Tobacco trade war ==
Since the implementation of Republic Act No. 10351 (Sin Tax Law), Philip Morris International (PMI) and PMFTC Inc. accused Mighty Corporation of various issues, yet no formal charges or complaint have been filed while the Bureau of Internal Revenue (BIR) has clarified to maintain a neutral position in the ongoing tobacco trade war. BIR Commissioner Kim Jacinto-Henares officially stated that "the burden of proof rests on PMI and PMFTC, they should prove that Mighty Corporation has evaded the government. If they cannot prove their allegation, then they may be liable for libel or slander." She said PMI's current hurdles in the Philippine market could have been avoided if PMFTC agreed to the government's original proposal of adopting a unitary tax system, which aimed to remove the tax rate gap between low- and high-priced cigarette brands. The BIR chief explained a unitary rate system on cigarette could have prevented smokers from down-shifting from high-priced brands, such as Marlboro, Winston and Lucky Strike, to low-priced brands, like Mighty.

In 2014, a Bureau of Customs (BOC) administrative order suspended the firm's customs bonded warehouse operations to assess and audit raw materials originally intended for export but were subsequently used for domestic production. After the assessment, the company paid a total of ₱978 million.

In March 2014, the BIR investigated Mighty Corporation for purported underpayment and unpaid tax levies. The BIR opted for the first time in its history, to field its personnel on a 24/7 basis to closely monitor Mighty Corp's operations. However, the tax agency reported no irregularities.

In October 2014, acting Senate Minority Leader Vicente Sotto III pointed out during a hearing of the Joint Congressional Oversight Committee on the Comprehensive Tax Reform Program, citing apparent tax leakages, particularly in the tobacco industry. According to Sotto, Mighty Corporation appeared to have questionable figures in the importation of tobacco leaves, and that the company have not declared importation of acetate tow, the material used to make cigarette filters which could not be locally sourced, for domestic consumption until 2013. However, BIR Commissioner Kim Henares, who was in the hearing, opposed the Senate Tax Study Research Office (STSRO) data, which included the discredited information on alleged illicit tobacco trade furnished by multinational research firms AC Nielsen, the International Tax and Investment Center (ITIC) and Oxford Economics, as inaccurate, incomplete and not validated. She also added that the data used as basis for the STSRO report were biased and paid for by Philip Morris International (PMI) and that cannot be a basis against Mighty Corporation. Based on ITIC's website, one of its directors is also a ranking official of Philip Morris.

In early 2015, PMFTC declared it had to restructure its manufacturing operations in the country, cutting close to 700 permanent positions and has blamed it on a "market disturbance" said to be generated by Mighty Corporation over the last two years. However, BIR Commissioner Kim Jacinto-Henares had already exposed a flaw in PMFTC's arguments regarding their labor problems the year prior that it would not have happened had the tobacco giant agreed from the start to keep the government's original intent of implementing a unitary tax system for the industry. A unitary tax system means that all brands and price points would have a single rate and thus downshifting by consumers would, in theory, be mitigated. The non-government organization and anti-tobacco advocate group South East Asian Tobacco Control Alliance (SEATCA) has contradicted PMFTC's claims of cooperation with governments worldwide need to be qualified. "For example, Philip Morris' collaboration with the European Union (EU) is the result of a 2004 legally binding out-of-court settlement by Philip Morris International (PMI) after it was sued by the EU for its involvement in tobacco smuggling," SEATCA pointed out. "As part of this settlement, PMI agreed to pay $1.25 billion over 12 years to the EU to fight illicit tobacco trade. It is unlikely that a corporation would resolve a lawsuit for over US$1 billion unless they felt the case against them was strong." SEATCA had also scored a Philip Morris-funded International Tax and Investment Centre and Oxford Economics joint report for using a flawed methodology and coming up with skewed findings that support the tobacco industry.

PMFTC had also resorted to the use of "paid advertisements" to attack Mighty Corporation which violates Section 22 of the Republic Act No. 9211 (or the Tobacco Regulation Act of 2003).

=== Allegations of using fake excise tax stamps ===
Mighty Corporation allegedly used fake tax stamps on cigarette packs, after Bureau of Customs conducted raids on its warehouses. Using taggant readers, they scanned and confiscated cigarette packs with alleged fake excise tax stamps on in San Simon, Pampanga, in March 2017 but the company denied the allegations, stating that the confiscated cigarettes used officially issued tax stamps.
