= Guiguinto station =

Train station in Bulacan, Philippines

Guiguinto
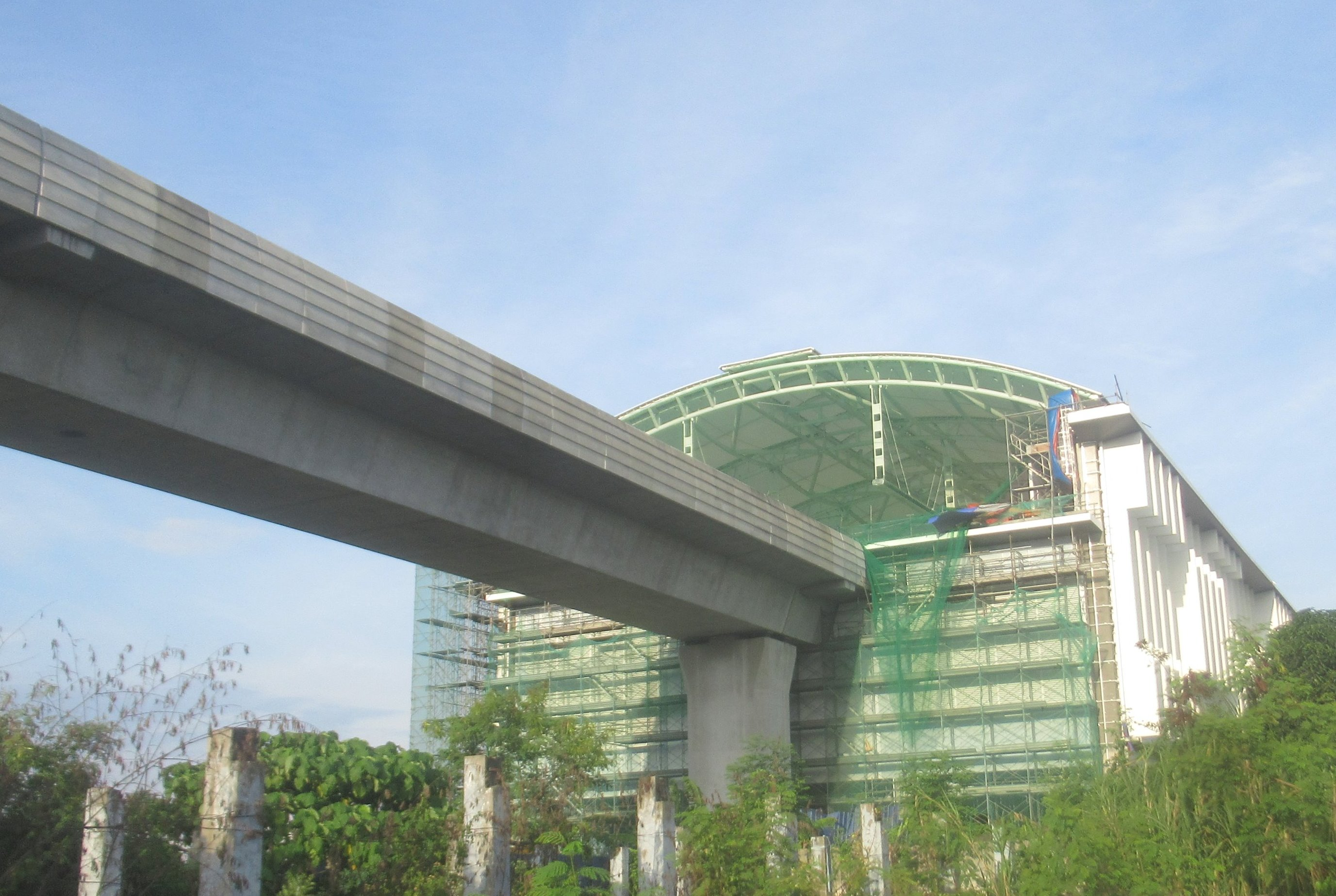
- The station under construction in May 2026

General information
- Location: Poblacion, Guiguinto, Bulacan; Philippines
- Coordinates: 14°49′48″N 120°53′02″E
- Owner: Philippine National Railways
- Operator: Philippine National Railways
- Lines: Planned: North Commuter; Former: North Main Line
- Platforms: Side platform
- Tracks: 2

Construction
- Structure type: Elevated

Other information
- Status: Under construction
- Station code: GG

History
- Opened: March 24, 1891
- Rebuilt: 2020–ongoing

Services
Commuter rail
Location
- Location within Bulacan Location within Luzon Location within Philippines

Guiguinto station is an under-construction elevated North–South Commuter Railway (NSCR) station located in Guiguinto, Bulacan, Philippines. The station was part of the Philippine National Railways (PNR) North Main Line before its closure in the 1980s.

The station is parallel to MacArthur Highway, and it is near to the San Ildefonso Church and to the Guiguinto Municipal Hall.

== History ==
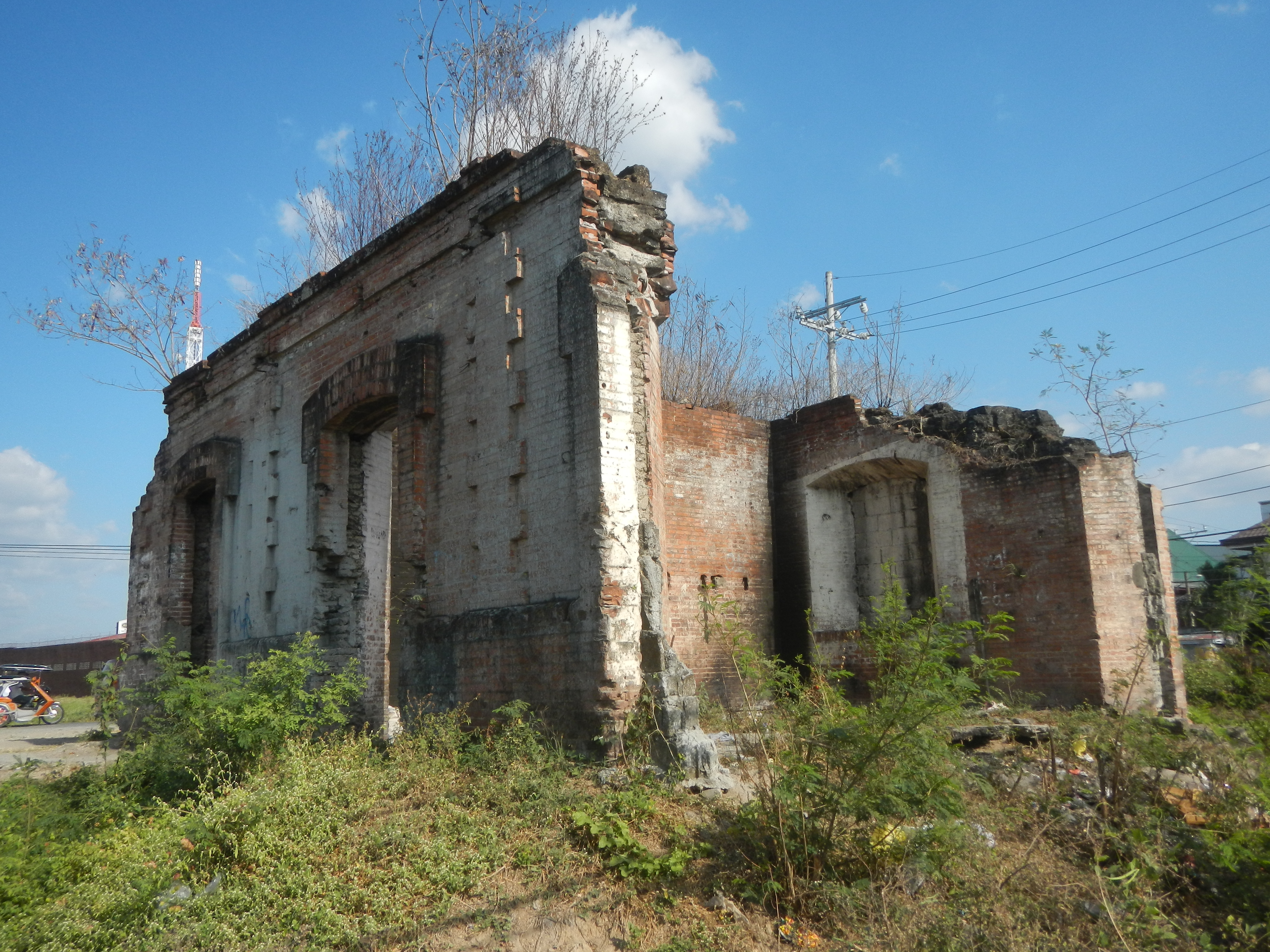
The old station's ruins in March 2017

The original railway station, then known as the Estacion de Guiguinto, was inaugurated in 1891 under Manila Railroad Company. It was the first railway station serving Guiguinto. It is a notable historical landmark in the municipality. It was upon this site that the Katipuneros ambushed a train from Dagupan, killing six friars, including the parish priest of Guiguinto, Fr. Leocadio Sanchez, and a Spanish doctor. It later became part of the Philippine National Railways's North Main Line.

The station was to be rebuilt as a part of the Northrail project. The project commenced in 2007 but was repeatedly halted then discontinued in 2011.

It is currently being rebuilt as part of the first phase of the North–South Commuter Railway. As part of the project, the old station will also be restored. Partial operations are slated to begin by 2027.
