= Calumpit station =

Railway station in the Philippines

Calumpit
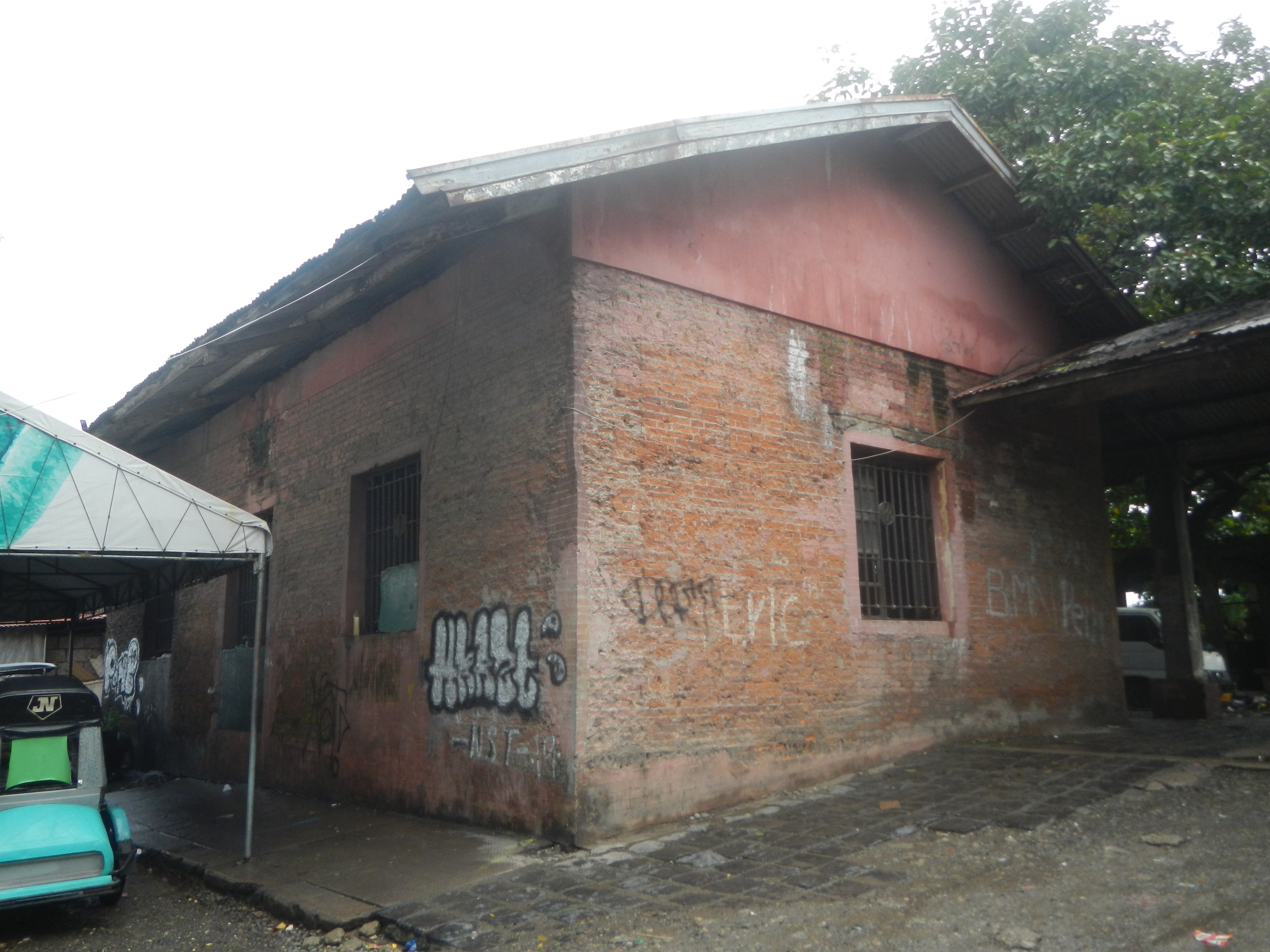

General information
- Location: Calumpit, Bulacan; Philippines
- Coordinates: 14°54′59″N 120°45′57″E
- Owner: Philippine National Railways
- Operator: Philippine National Railways
- Lines: Planned: North Commuter; Former: North Main Line
- Platforms: Island platform
- Tracks: 4

Construction
- Architectural style: Bahay na bato (old station); Contemporary (new station)

Other information
- Status: Under construction
- Station code: CLM

History
- Opened: March 24, 1891; 2024
- Closed: 1988
- Rebuilt: 2021–ongoing

Future servies
Preceding station	PNR	Following station
Apalit towards Clark International Airport	NSCR Commuter	Malolos towards Calamba
Apalit towards New Clark City	NSCR Commuter	Malolos towards Tutuban
Location

Calumpit station is an under-construction elevated North–South Commuter Railway (NSCR) station located in Calumpit, Bulacan, Philippines. The station was part of the Philippine National Railways (PNR) North Main Line before its closure in the 1980s.

== History ==
The station has been used for passenger and freight transportation by the Philippine National Railways (PNR) and its precursors in the past. The station was to be rebuilt as a part of the Northrail project, which involved the upgrading of the existing single track to an elevated dual-track system, converting the rail gauge from narrow gauge to standard gauge, and linking Manila to Malolos in Bulacan and further on to Angeles City, Clark Special Economic Zone and Clark International Airport. The project commenced in 2007, but was repeatedly halted then discontinued in 2011.

It is currently being rebuilt as part of the second phase of the North–South Commuter Railway. The old station will be preserved. Partial operations are slated to begin by 2027.

== Gallery ==
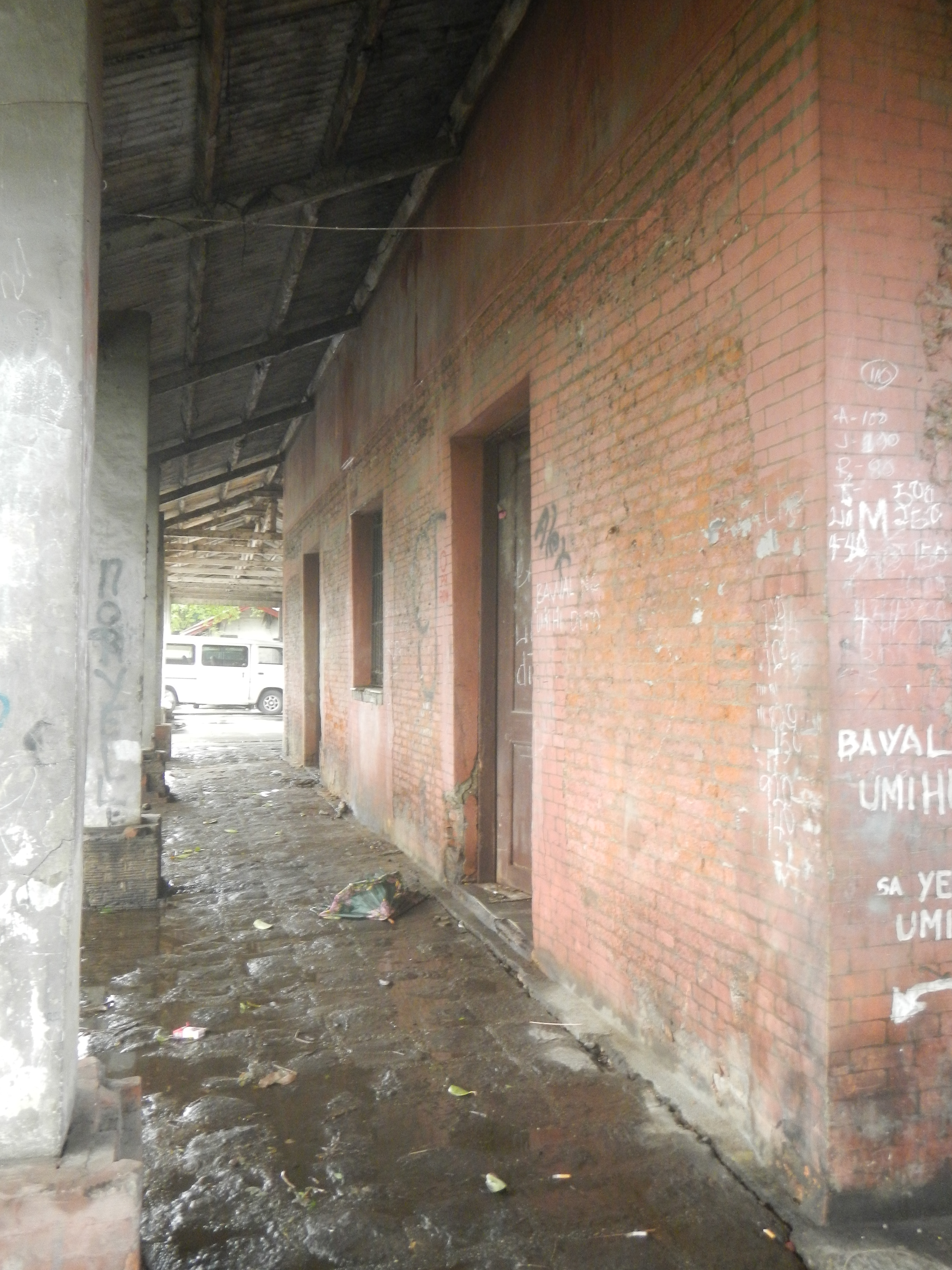
View of the exterior

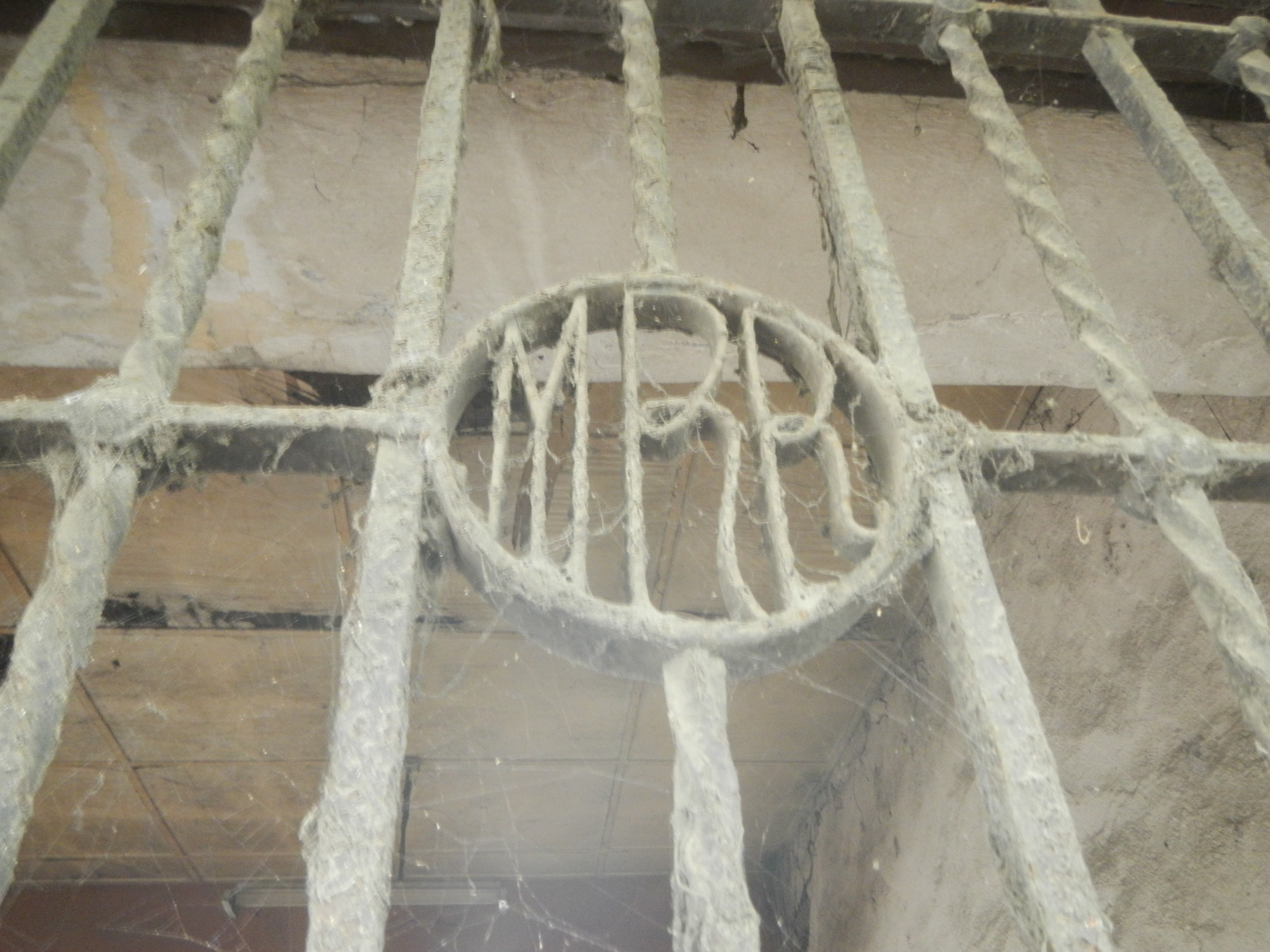
Window grills with the logo of the Manila Railroad Company

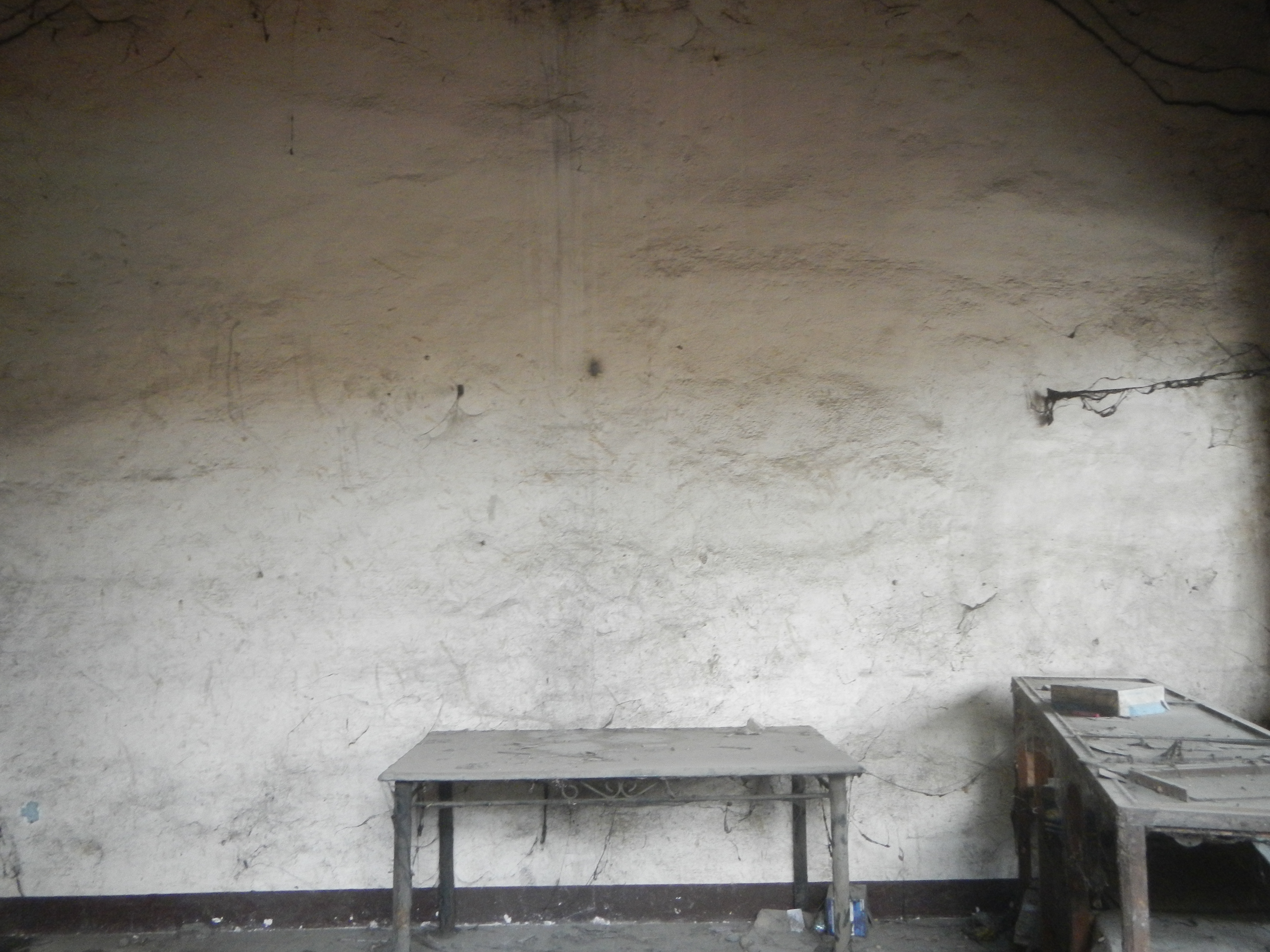
View of the interior
