= Oscar Barrientos =

Filipino judge and businessman

Oscar Barrientos (born July 16, 1943 Occidental Mindoro, Philippines) is a retired Philippine Regional Trial Court judge. He has been an executive vice president of and spokesman for Mighty Corporation since November 2013.

== Career ==
Barrientos is a qualified lawyer and a certified public accountant; he was admitted to the Philippine Bar on March 9, 1971. He graduated from Far Eastern University in Manila with a double major in commerce and law. He later earned a master's degree at the Asian Institute of Management.

Barrientos is a businessman, professor, and lawyer, with experience in corporate law, financial management, and managerial accounting. He was appointed judge of Malolos Regional Trial Court (Branch 82) in 1995. Barrientos retired from the bench and took a leave from teaching in late 2012.
