= Guiguinto Church =

Roman Catholic church in Bulacan, Philippines

- San Ildefonso de Toledo Parish Church; Parish of St. Ildephonse of Toledo
- Iglesia Parroquial de San Ildefonso (Spanish)
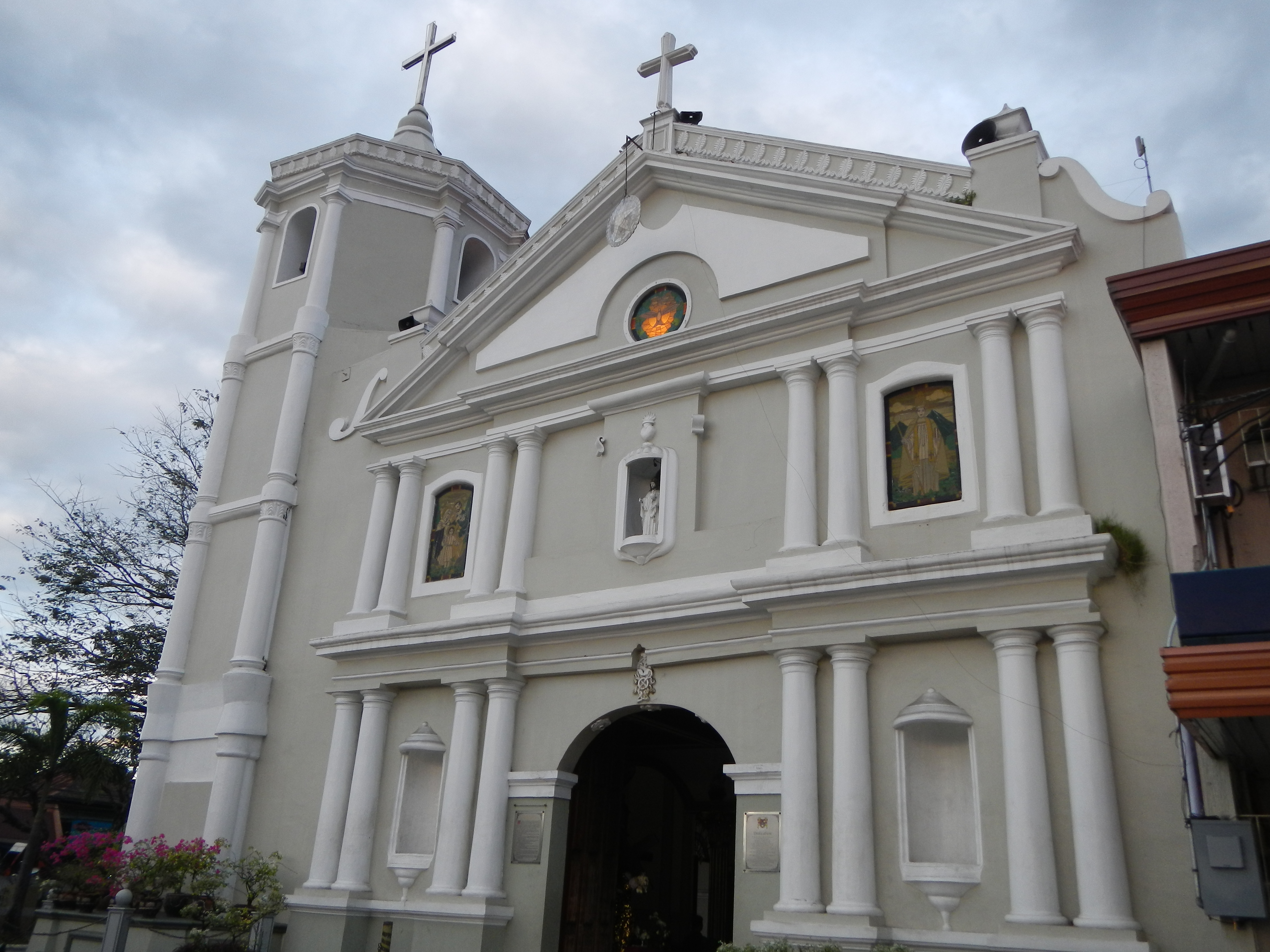
- Church facade in 2013

- Location in Bulacan Location in Luzon Location in the Philippines
- 14°49′40″N 120°52′38″E
- Location: Poblacion, Guiguinto, Bulacan
- Country: Philippines
- Denomination: Roman Catholic

History
- Status: Parish church
- Founded: 1591, 1963
- Dedication: Saint Ildephonsus

Architecture
- Functional status: Active
- Architectural type: Church building
- Style: Barn-style Baroque
- Groundbreaking: 1691

Specifications
- Length: 40 metres (130 ft)
- Materials: Stone, Sand, Gravel, Cement, Steel

Administration
- Archdiocese: Manila
- Diocese: Malolos

Clergy
- Archbishop: Jose Advincula
- Bishop: Dennis Cabanada Villarojo
- Priest: Rev. Fr. Cenon Dennis G. Santos

San Ildefonso de Toledo Parish Church, commonly known as Guiguinto Church, is an 18th-century, Baroque Roman Catholic church located along the MacArthur Highway, Brgy. Poblacion, Guiguinto, Bulacan, Philippines. The parish church, under the aegis of Saint Ildephonsus, Bishop of Toledo, is under the jurisdiction of the Diocese of Malolos. The church is connected to St. Martin de Porres Catholic school of Guiguinto, a private school in Guiguinto.

== History ==
=== Parish history ===
Guiguinto was founded by the Augustinian Friars as a visita of nearby town Caruya (now Balagtas) on October 31, 1607, and placed under the advocation of Saint Ildephonsus although it has been mentioned in the records as early as 1591. On October 31, 1617, it was annexed to the parish of Bulakan. In 1621, the convent of Guiguinto was declared independent from its matrix with Father Bernabe de Villalobos as first parish priest. However, it was again attached to the convent of Bigaa in 1633. Records tell that the convent of Guiguinto was not as affluent as its neighbors. In 1641, it was exempted from paying its dues to the San Agustin Monastery in Manila due to lack of funds. A similar incident occurred in 1669.

=== Edifice history ===
The exact date of construction of the present parochial structure could not be identified clearly. It is assumed that the ministers of Guiguinto were only able to erect parochial structures after 1621. Moreover, records tell that the convent of Guiguinto applied for the collection of rice for the construction of a church in 1734. This leads to the estimate that construction of the present church may have started by the latter part of the 17th century but was still unfinished by 1734. Father Buzeta, parish priest in 1832, built the road to Bigaa and the Catholic cemetery in 1848. The church and convent of Guiguinto sustained great damage from an earthquake in 1863. Repair works were still being conducted in 1864.

Between 1955 and the early 1960s, the church of Guiguinto was renovated under Father Carlos E. Bernardo. The remodeling, which involved the plastering of the exterior, repainting of the entire structure and construction of a new altarpiece, reportedly costs ₱ 50, 000.00.

== Architecture ==
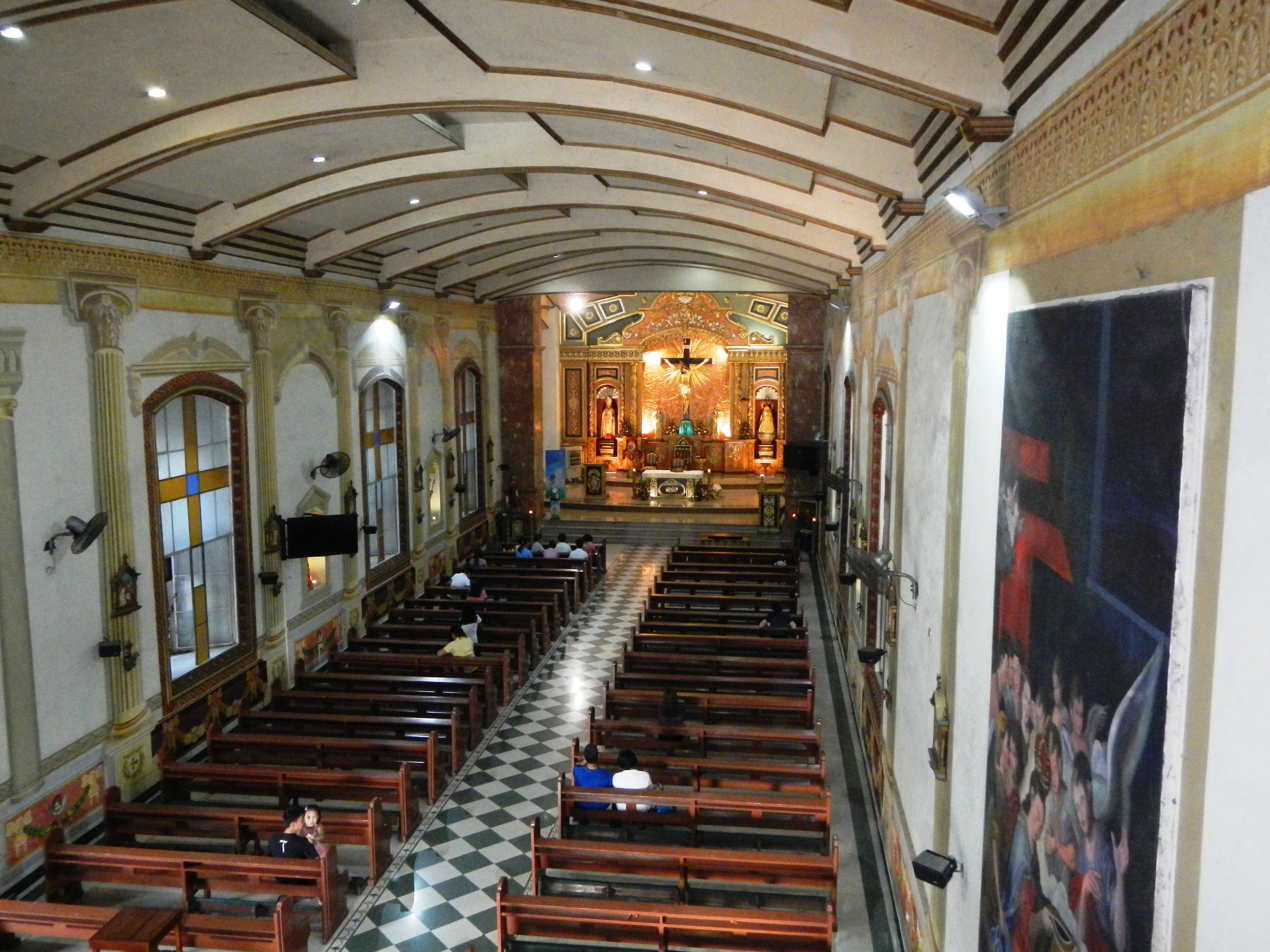
Church interior in 2014

The façade is divided into three vertical sections by four sets of Doric columns. The columns, which is said to be added for ornamentation purposes, supports a triangular pediment adorned by an oculus and volutes on the end. Geometric motifs can also be found on the plastered side portals. Saint's niches, stained glass and an Augustinian emblem add details to the otherwise plain façade. To the right of the church rises the four-level, octagonal bell tower which features similar designs as the façade. Two bells can be found on the tower: one cast by Hilario Sunico in 1889 and was installed by Father Pedro Quiros and a smaller one dating 1887.
