= Guiguinto =

Municipality in Bulacan, Philippines

- Municipality
- Municipality of Guiguinto
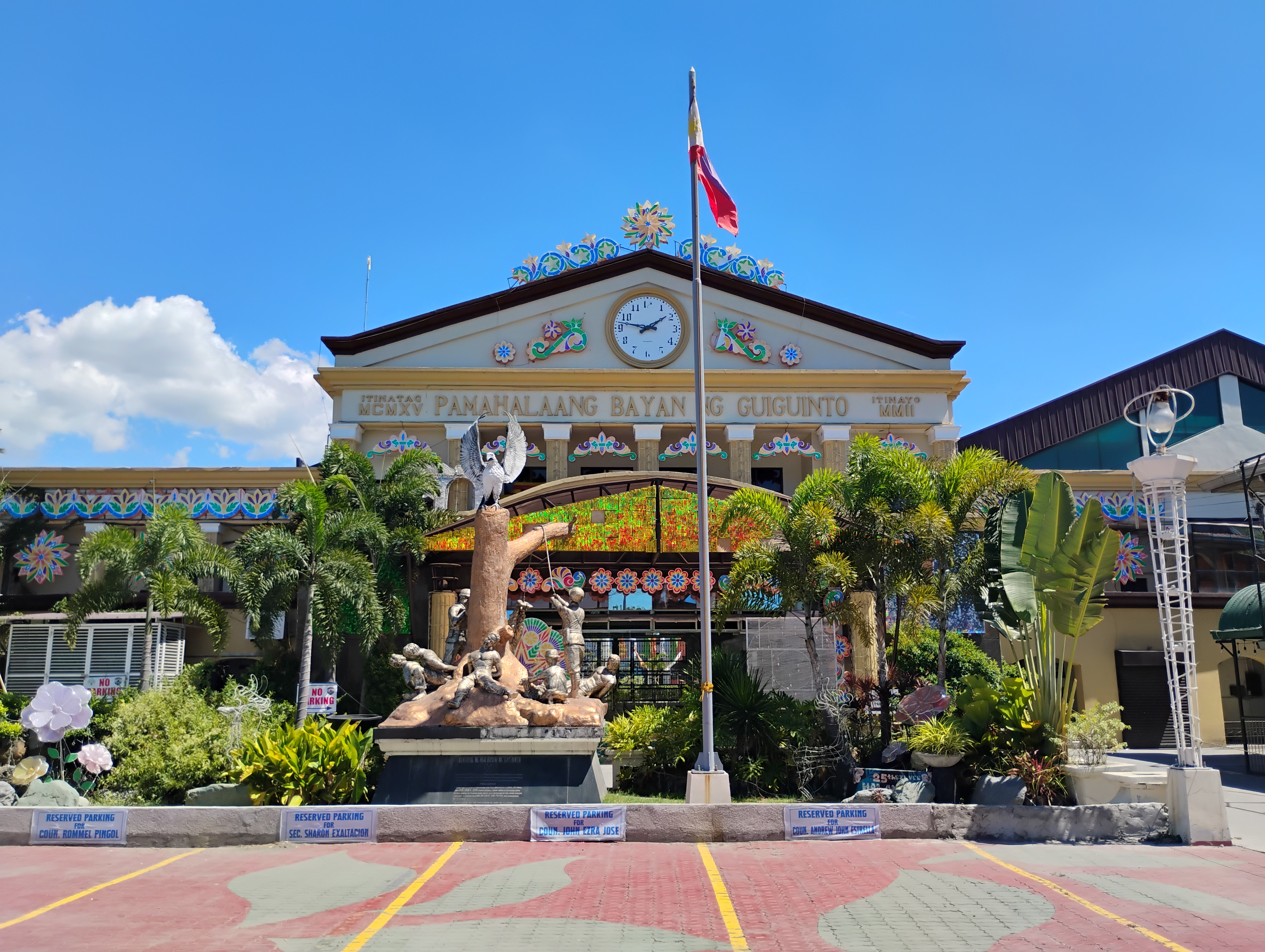
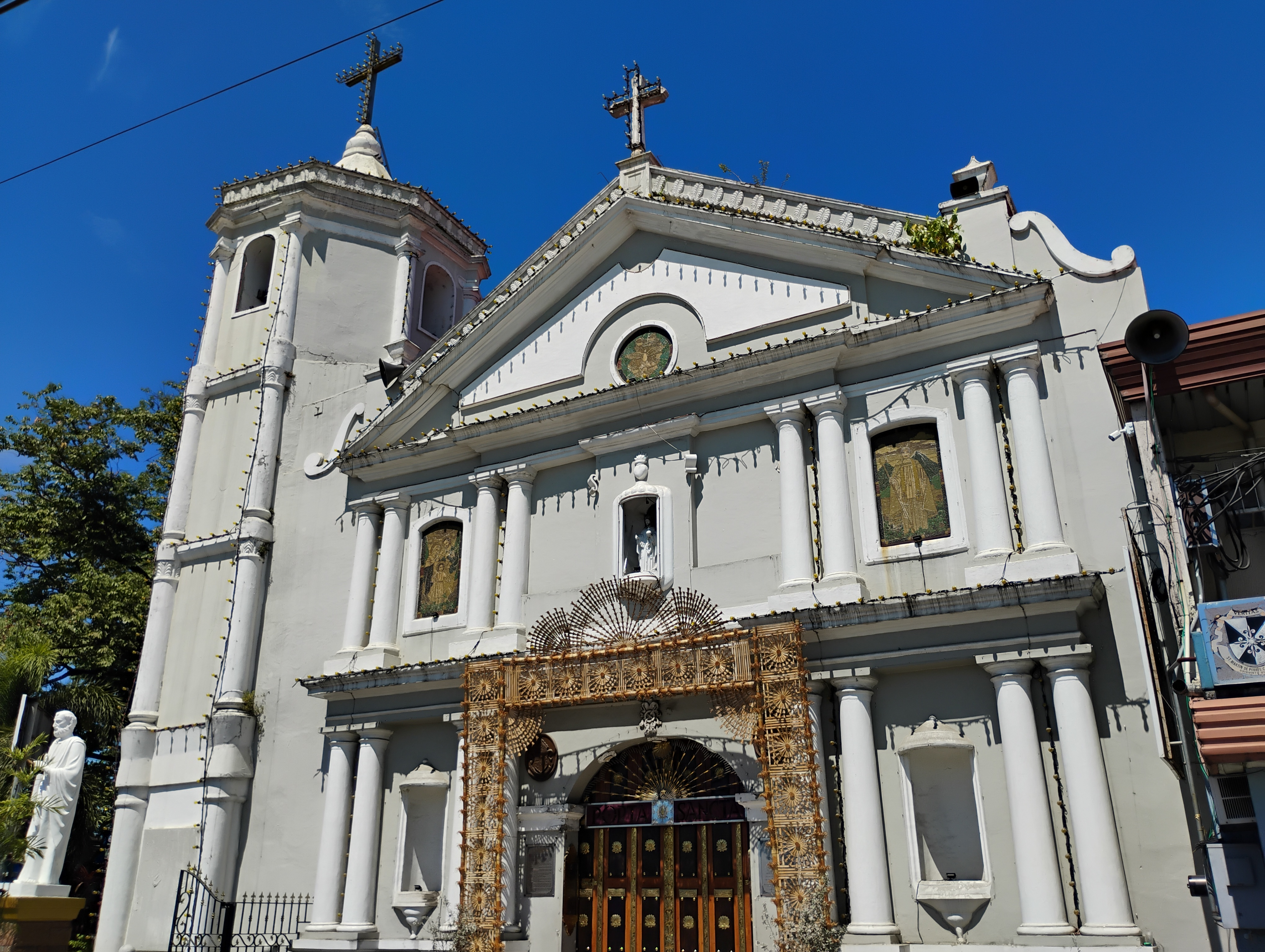
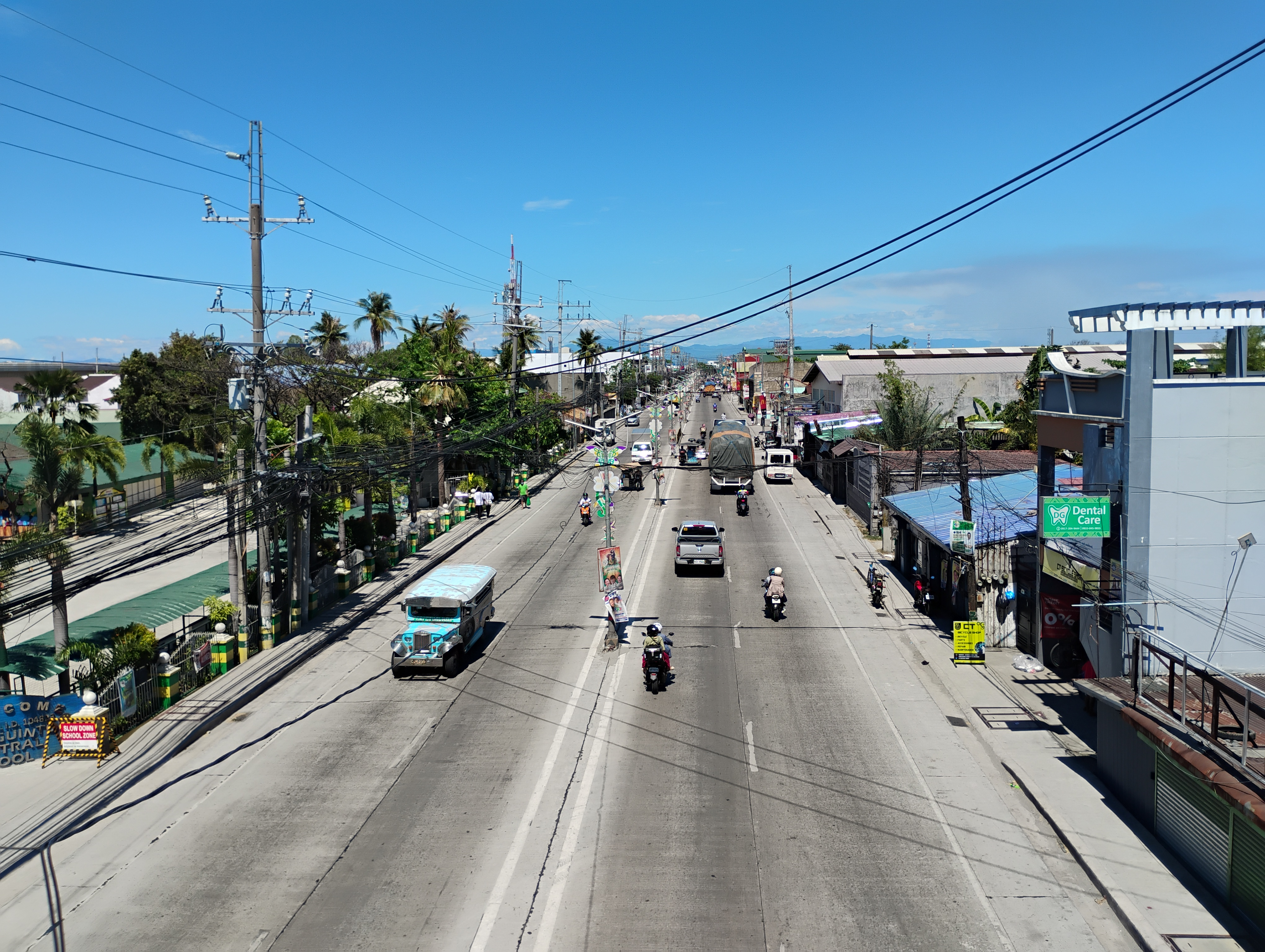
- Guiguinto Municipal Hall Saint Ildephonsus of Toledo Parish Church Guiguinto Town Proper

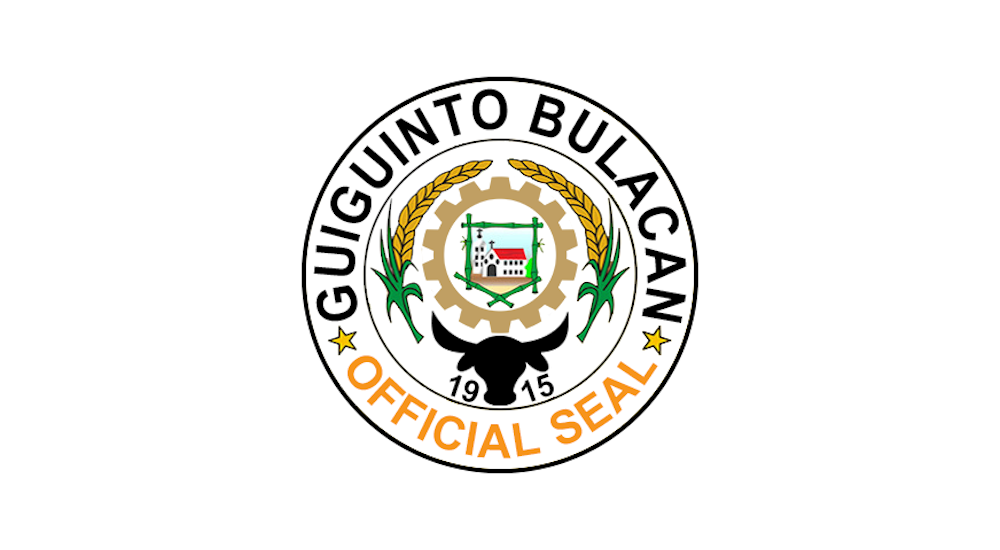
- Flag
- Nickname: Garden Haven of the Philippines
- Motto(s): Basta Magaling, sa Guiguinto Galing!
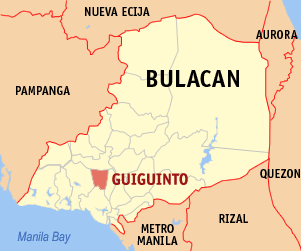
- Map of Bulacan with Guiguinto highlighted
- Interactive map of Guiguinto
- Location within the Philippines
- Coordinates: 14°50′N 120°53′E
- Country: Philippines
- Region: Central Luzon
- Province: Bulacan
- District: 5th district
- Founded: January 1, 1915
- Barangays: 14 (see Barangays)

Government
  - Type: Sangguniang Bayan
  - Mayor: Ambrosio C. Cruz
  - Vice Mayor: Eliseo B. Santos Jr.
  - Representative: Agatha Paula A. Cruz
  - Municipal Council: Members: Ernesto B. Jose; Evangeline V. Ventura; Rommel B. Pingol; Estrelita P. Aballa; Larra Monica S. Ventura; Annabelle A. Garcia; Mara Alyanna V. Dela Cruz; Romeo D. Tonog
  - Electorate: 78,751 voters (2025)

Area
  - Total: 27.50 km^{2} (10.62 sq mi)
- Elevation: 16 m (52 ft)
- Highest elevation: 53 m (174 ft)
- Lowest elevation: −2 m (−6.6 ft)

Population (2024 census)
  - Total: 118,173
  - Density: 4,297/km^{2} (11,130/sq mi)
  - Households: 28,070
- Demonym(s): Guiguinteño (masculine); Guiguinteña (feminine)

Economy
  - Income class: 1st municipal income class
  - Poverty incidence: 9.18% (2023)
  - Revenue: ₱ 835.9 million (2024)
  - Assets: ₱ 1,736 million (2024)
  - Expenditure: ₱ 760.3 million (2024)
  - Liabilities: ₱ 758.6 million (2024)

Utilties
  - Electricity: Meralco
- Time zone: UTC+8 (PST)
- ZIP code: 3015
- PSGC: 0301408000
- IDD : area code: +63 (0)44
- Native languages: Tagalog
- Website: guiguinto.gov.ph

Guiguinto, officially the Municipality of Guiguinto (Tagalog: Bayan ng Guiguinto), is a municipality in the province of Bulacan, Philippines. According to the 2024 census, it has a population of 118,173 people.

It is the birthplace of composer Constancio de Guzman, known for writing songs like "Maalaala Mo Kaya". It also houses the Immaculate Conception Seminary, a Diocesan Seminary of the Diocese of Malolos located in barangay Tabe. The appellation “Guiguinto” literally translates to “Gold” (ginto for Tagalog, gintu for Kapampangan) for the early conquistadores came and saw this town on a harvest season when it lushes in golden rice stalks against the sun.

== History ==
Guiguinto began as a barrio of Bulakan, the former provincial capital of Bulacan. It is said that Spaniards set up an army post in the barrio to serve as a resting place fr forces going to Northern Luzon. In those days, travel throughout Guiguinto was difficult and slow down to cross single file over a narrow bamboo bridge. Their Filipino guides would cry out, "Hinto" (Tagalog for stop). The Spaniards thought this was the name "Hihinto". The Spaniards substituted "Gui" (with hard "g") for the Tagalog "Hi". The place has since been called Guiguinto.

On the other hand, other town elders say that on moonlight nights, a golden bull emerges from the church and goes down to the nearby river to quench his thirst. It then returns to the church, ascends at the altar and disappears. The elders' aid that there are buried jars of gold in town, as indicated by the bull, and that is why the town was called Guiguinto. It became an encomienda in the 1591 but the ecclesiastical administration was under Bulakan Convent and it was established as a town in 1641.

In 1800, an Augustinian friar erected a small chapel in what is now barrio Santa Rita. In 1873, roads were constructed in barrio Malis. The people barrios of Pritil, Tabe, and Cutcut even those days were mostly farmers. During Holy Week, villagers of barrio Tuktukan held contest for the hardest egg shells (chicken, duck or goose by knocking eggs together (Tuktukan)). The women tried to help each other in singing the "Panica".

Just before the outbreak of the revolution of 1896, the town people of Guiguinto were ordered to sleep in the town at night and to work in their fields only in the day. This was said to have been suggested by the town priest to the authorities because of rumors that many of the town people were joining the secret revolutionary society, the Katipunan. Guiguinto eventually contributed many soldiers to the 1896 revolution.

At the time of American occupation, the new colonizers reorganized the Province of Bulacan into 19 municipalities from the original 26. Under populated town were subordinated with the large one and the town of Guiguinto was integrated in the town of Bulakan for almost 11 years. In 1915, Guiguinto regain its township again with Antonio Figueroa as its municipal mayor of the modern period. The town's population was then about 4,000. The 1960 census placed Guiguinto's population at 10,629.

== Geography ==
Guiguinto is 34 kilometers (21 mi) from Manila and 11 kilometers (6.8 mi) from Malolos.

With the continuous expansion of Metro Manila, Guiguinto is part of Manila's built-up area which reaches San Ildefonso, Bulacan at its northernmost part.

=== Barangays ===
Guiguinto is politically subdivided into 14 barangays, as shown in the matrix below. Each barangay consists of puroks and some have sitios.

PSGC	Barangay	Population			±% p.a.	
		2024		2010		
031408001	Cutcut	2.5%	2,940	2,701	▴	0.59%
031408002	Daungan	1.5%	1,800	1,384	▴	1.84%
031408003	Ilang‑Ilang	4.8%	5,628	4,436	▴	1.66%
031408004	Malis	13.7%	16,223	13,957	▴	1.05%
031408005	Panginay	1.3%	1,528	1,159	▴	1.93%
031408006	Poblacion	3.5%	4,099	3,852	▴	0.43%
031408007	Pritil	4.4%	5,172	4,165	▴	1.51%
031408008	Pulong Gubat	1.6%	1,879	3,186	▾	−3.59%
031408009	Santa Cruz	10.3%	12,216	11,639	▴	0.34%
031408010	Santa Rita	11.6%	13,687	13,163	▴	0.27%
031408011	Tabang	7.5%	8,832	7,332	▴	1.30%
031408012	Tabe	7.0%	8,310	7,204	▴	1.00%
031408013	Tiaong	6.5%	7,640	7,279	▴	0.34%
031408015	Tuktukan	8.3%	9,776	9,050	▴	0.54%
	Total		118,173	90,507	▴	1.87%

=== Climate ===
Climate data for Guiguinto, Bulacan
Month	Jan	Feb	Mar	Apr	May	Jun	Jul	Aug	Sep	Oct	Nov	Dec	Year
Mean daily maximum °C (°F)	28 (82)	29 (84)	31 (88)	33 (91)	32 (90)	31 (88)	30 (86)	29 (84)	29 (84)	30 (86)	30 (86)	28 (82)	30 (86)
Mean daily minimum °C (°F)	20 (68)	20 (68)	21 (70)	22 (72)	24 (75)	24 (75)	24 (75)	24 (75)	24 (75)	23 (73)	22 (72)	21 (70)	22 (72)
Average precipitation mm (inches)	6 (0.2)	4 (0.2)	6 (0.2)	17 (0.7)	82 (3.2)	122 (4.8)	151 (5.9)	123 (4.8)	124 (4.9)	99 (3.9)	37 (1.5)	21 (0.8)	792 (31.1)
Average rainy days	3.3	2.5	11.7	6.6	17.7	22.2	25.2	23.7	23.2	17.9	9.2	5.2	168.4
Source: Meteoblue

== Demographics ==
Population census of Guiguinto
Year	Pop.	±% p.a.
1903	3,948	—
1918	4,847	+1.38%
1939	6,199	+1.18%
1948	7,979	+2.84%
1960	10,629	+2.42%
1970	16,075	+4.22%
1975	20,590	+5.09%
1980	27,751	+6.15%
1990	44,532	+4.84%
1995	52,575	+3.16%
2000	67,571	+5.53%
2007	89,225	+3.91%
2010	90,507	+0.52%
2015	99,730	+1.87%
2020	113,415	+2.74%
2024	118,173	+0.99%
Source: Philippine Statistics Authority

In the 2020 census, the population of Guiguinto, was 113,415 people, with a density of 4,100 inhabitants per square kilometer or 11,000 inhabitants per square mile.

== Economy ==
Poverty incidence of Guiguinto (%)

Source: Philippine Statistics Authority

== Attractions ==
- San Ildefonso Parish Church
- Guiguinto station

=== Halamanan Festival ===
Established in 1999 by Mayor Ambrosio Cruz, Jr., the Halamanan Festival has since become the brand of the Municipality of Guiguinto. It was conducted in gratitude and recognition Guiguinto's dear patron, St. Ildephonsus (San Ildefonso), who held every January 23. It is considered that grand Street Dancing Festival, the participation of dancers from the schools and villages of Guiguinto and be in different towns of Bulacan. They adorned the garments as flowers and more. Besides the celebration for the feast of San Ildefonso was also a means to further pitting and display capabilities and "galing" of Guiguinteño in various fields of horticulture as landscaping, propagation seedling, plant growing, flower cutting, arranging and interior decorating.

== Education ==
The Guiguinto Schools District Office governs all educational institutions within the municipality. It oversees the management and operations of all private and public, from primary to secondary schools.

== Local Government ==
2025-2028 Guiguinto, Bulacan Officials
Position	Name	Party
Mayor	Ambrosio C. Cruz Jr.	Lakas
Vice Mayor	Eliseo B. Santos Jr.	Independent
Councilors	Ernesto B. Jose	Independent
Councilors	Evangeline V. Villanueva	Lakas
Councilors	Rommel B. Pingol	Lakas
Councilors	Estrelita P. Aballa	Lakas
Councilors	Larra Monica V. Mariano	Lakas
Councilors	Annabelle A. Garcia	Lakas
Councilors	Mara Alyanna V. Dela Cruz	Independent
Councilors	Romeo D. Tonog	Lakas
Ex Officio Municipal Council Members
ABC President	TBD	Nonpartisan
SK Federation President	TBD	Nonpartisan

== Gallery ==
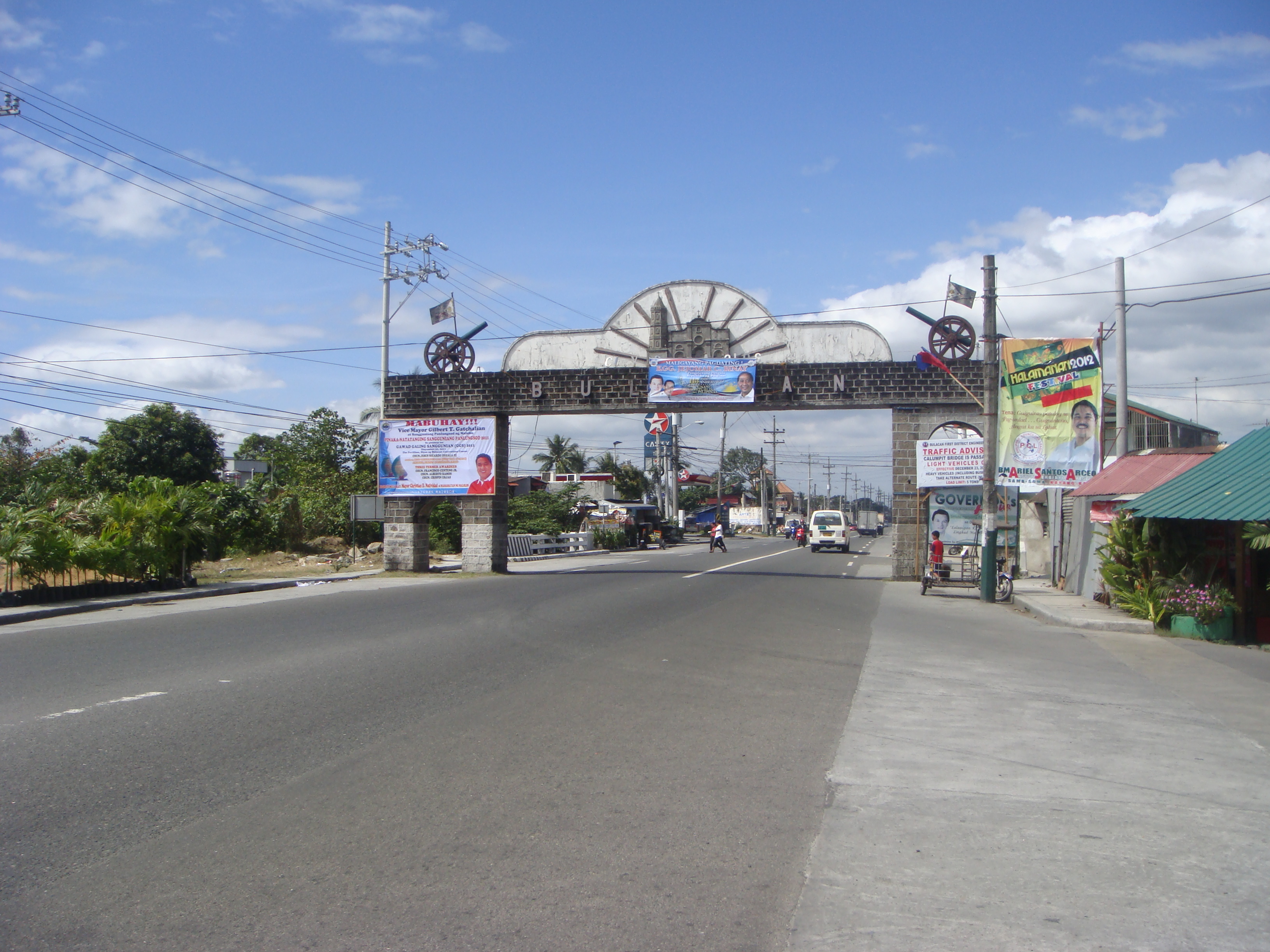
Bulacan Welcome Arch (Santa Cruz)

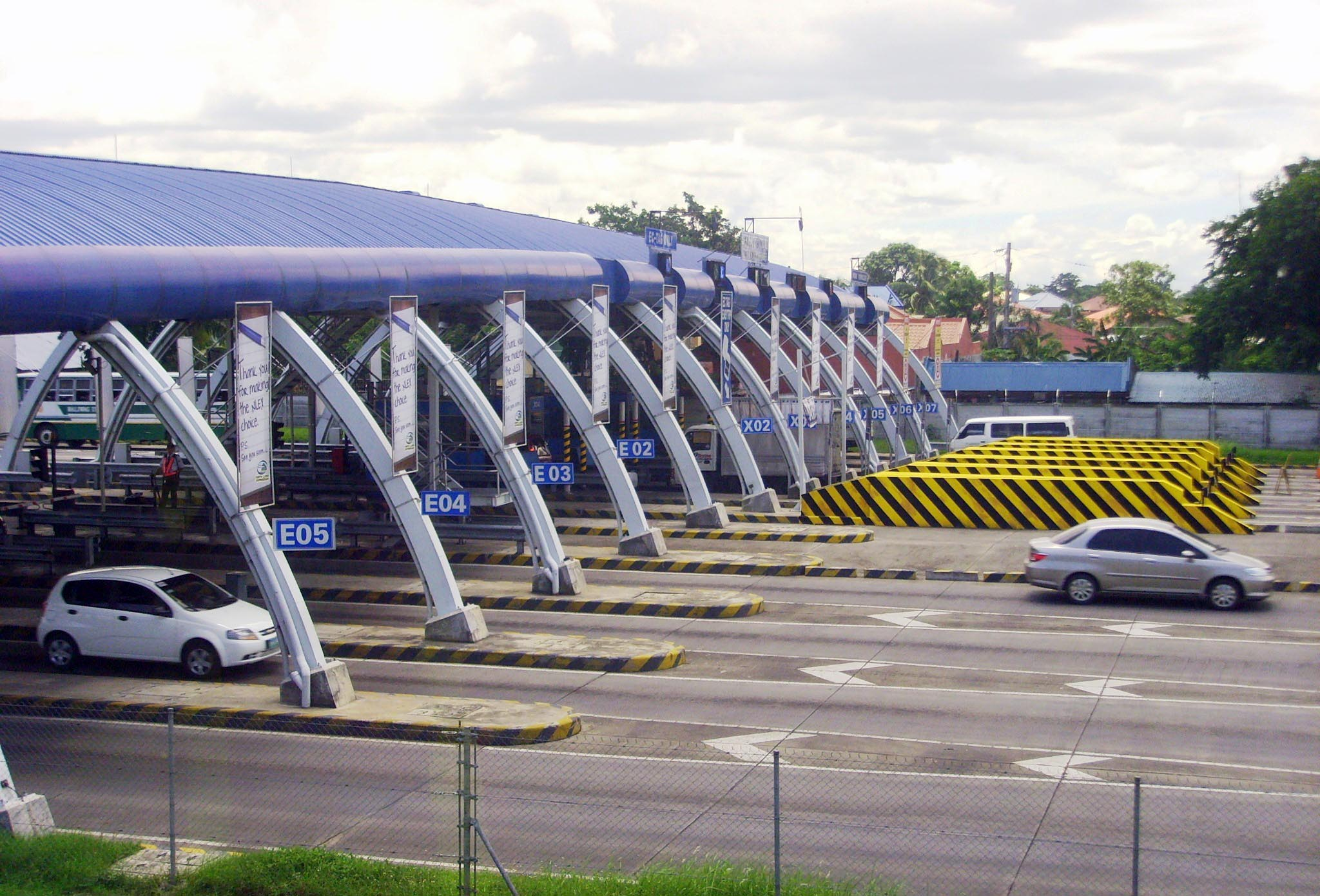
The Tabang Toll Barrier (NLEX)

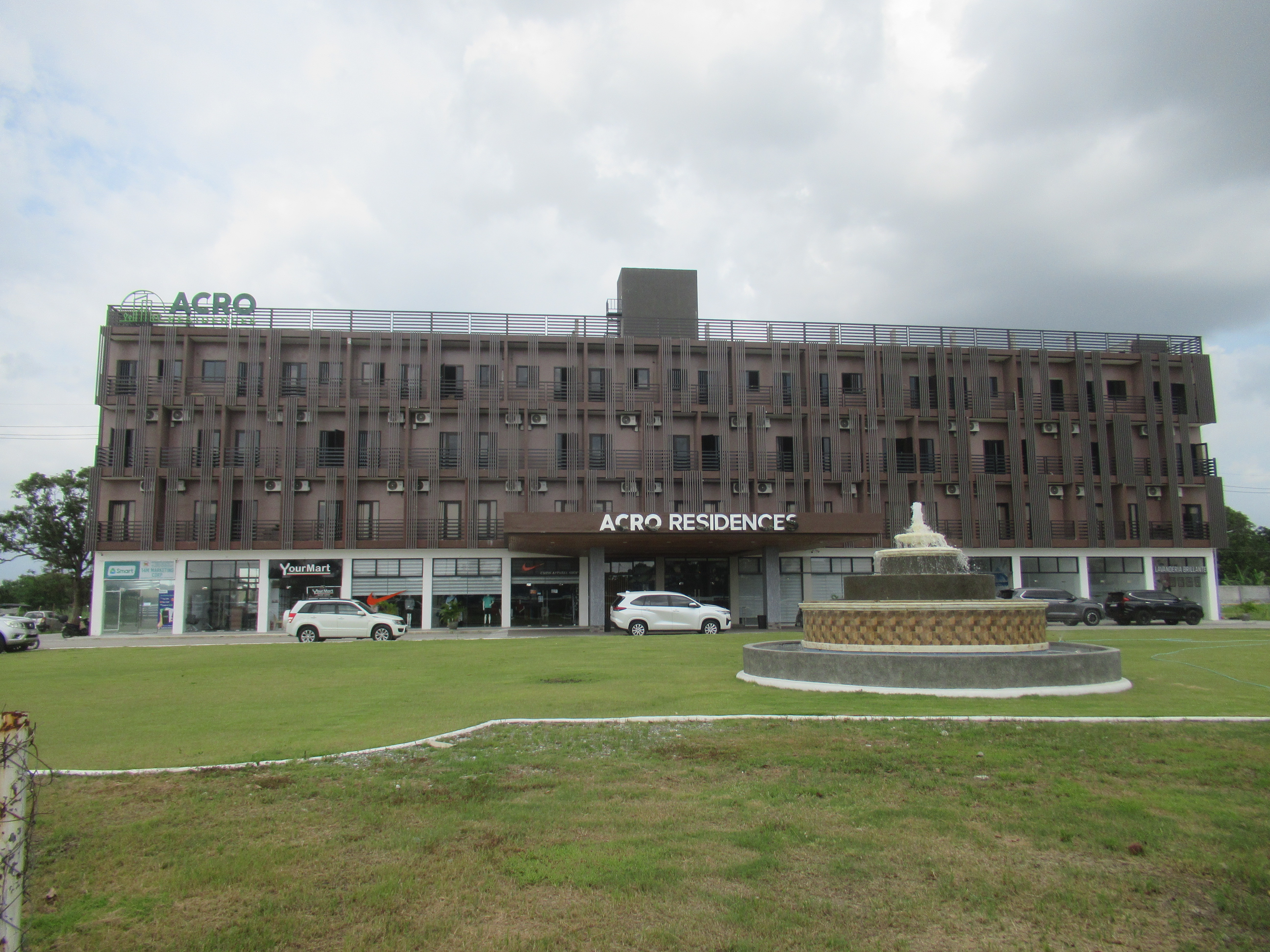
Acro Residences

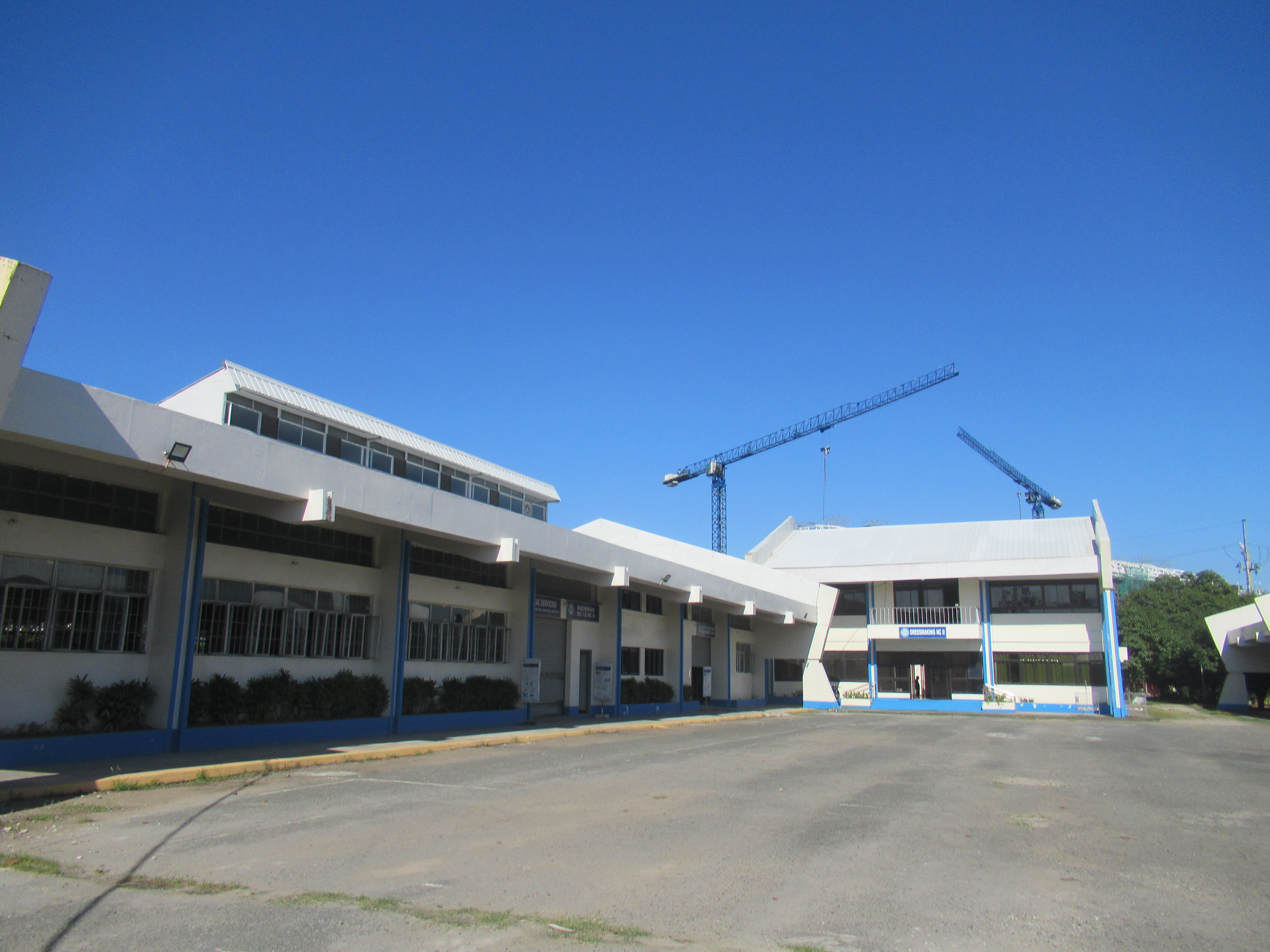
TESDA Regional Training Center Central Luzon

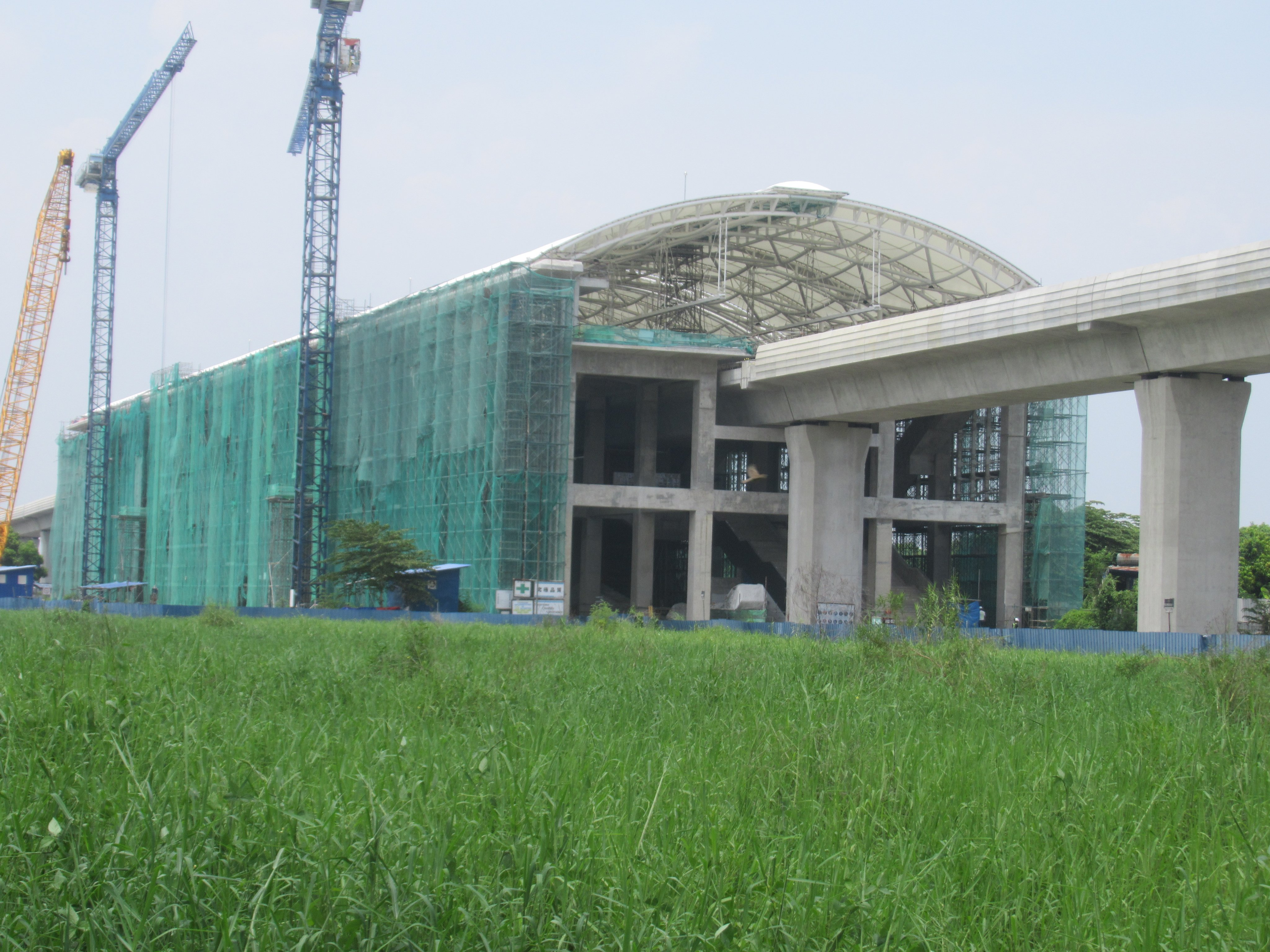
New Guiguinto station in Barangay Tabang
