= 203 (disambiguation) =

203 is a year.

203 may also refer to:

- 203 BC
- 203 (number)
- AS-203, an uncrewed flight of the Saturn IB rocket on July 5, 1966
- AK-203, an assault rifle
- Hill 203, a high ground located in Lushunkou District, Dalian, Liaoning Province, China
- MAZ-203, a bus
- UFC 203, a mixed martial arts event produced by the Ultimate Fighting Championship
- VMAT-203, a squadron in the United States Marine Corps that trained naval aviators to fly the AV-8B Harrier
- 203 series, an electric multiple unit train type
- Peugeot 203, a family car
- VFA-203, a Strike Fighter Squadron of the U.S. Naval Reserve
- Room 203, an American horror film
- MP-203, an unfinished motorway in Madrid, Spain that connects from Mejorada del Campo to San Fernando de Henares
- JWH-203, an analgesic chemical from the phenylacetylindole family
- 203 Pompeja, a large main asteroid belt

== See also ==
- 203rd (disambiguation)
- Flight 203 (disambiguation)
- List of highways numbered 203
- Proposition 203 (disambiguation)
