= C203 =

C203 or variant. may refer to:

- Minolta C203, a photocopier; see List of Minolta products
- Nokia C2-03, a cellphone
- SpaceX Dragon 2 C203, a prototype space capsule
- Agency for Defense Development (ADD) C203, a design proposal that lead to the KAI KF-21 Boramae South Korean fighter plane
- C203, a vehicle used by Pennsylvania mass transit provider CamTran
- Coleraine–Balmoral Road (C203), Victoria, Australia; see List of road routes in Victoria
- Pegarah Road (C203), Tasmania, Australia; see List of road routes in Tasmania

== See also ==
- 203 (disambiguation)
- C (disambiguation)
