= 203 series =

Japanese train type

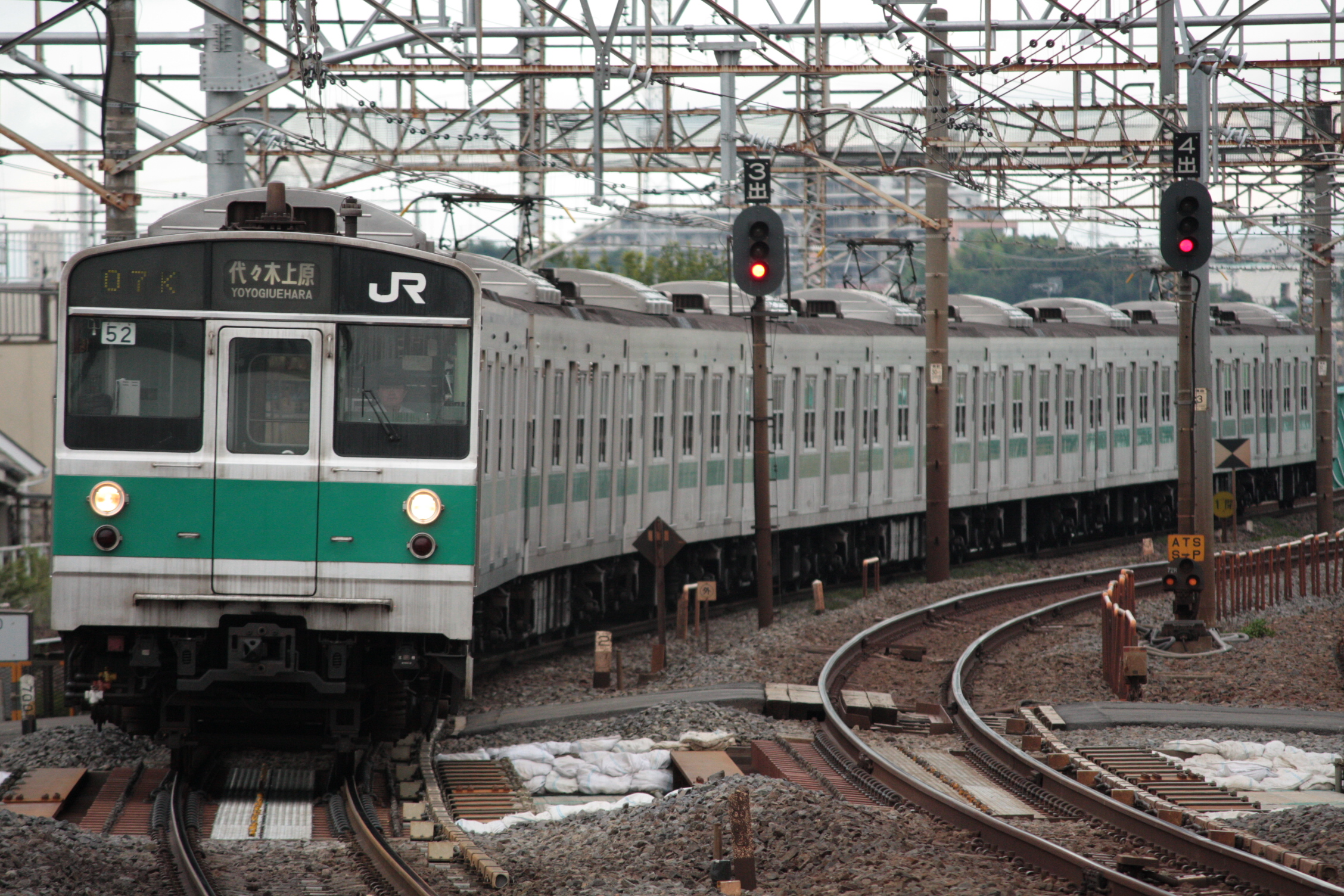
- 203 series in 2009
- In service: 1982–2011 (Japan); 2011–2025 (Indonesia); 2012–2024 (Philippines, commercial operations only)
- Manufacturers: Kawasaki Heavy Industries, Kinki Sharyo, Tokyu Car Corporation
- Replaced: 103-1000 series (Japan); PNR 7A-2000 Class (Philippines)
- Constructed: 1982–1986
- Entered service: November 1982
- Refurbished: 2020–2023 (PNR)
- Scrapped: 2010–
- Number built: 170 vehicles (17 sets)
- Number in service: Currently none due to temporary suspension of railway operation (PNR)
- Number preserved: 3 vehicles
- Number scrapped: 80 vehicles (8 sets) (JR East); 10 vehicles (all intermediate cars) (KAI Commuter)
- Successor: E233-2000 series (Japan); PNR 8300 Class (Philippines); CLI-125 series and CLI-225 series (Indonesia)
- Formation: 10 cars per trainset (JNR, JR); 8, 10 and 12 cars per trainset (KAI Commuter); 5 cars per trainset (PNR)
- Fleet numbers: 71–78, 61–69 (JNR); 51–58, 61–69 (JR East); 1, 2, 106, 108, 109 (KAI Commuter); 01–08 (PNR)
- Capacity: 528
- Operators: JNR (1982–1987); JR East (1987–2011); KAI Commuter (2011–2025); PNR (2012–2024) commercial operations only
- Depots: Matsudo (JR East, JNR); Bukit Duri, Bogor (KAI Commuter); Tutuban (PNR)
- Lines served: Operational: PNR: PNR Metro South Commuter Line (2012–2024); PNR Inter-Provincial Commuter (2023–); Retired: Japan: JR East Joban Line; Tokyo Metro Chiyoda Line; KAI Commuter: KAI Commuter Bogor Line; KAI Commuter Cikarang Loop Line (seasonal); KAI Commuter Rangkasbitung Line; KAI Commuter Tangerang Line

Specifications
- Car body construction: Aluminium
- Car length: 20,000 mm (65 ft 7 in)
- Width: 2,800 mm (9 ft 2 in)
- Doors: 4 pairs per side
- Maximum speed: 100 km/h (62 mph)
- Traction system: Mitsubishi / Toshiba Chopper
- Traction motors: MT60 × 24
- Power output: 150 kW (201 hp) (motors); 256 kW (343 hp) (generator)
- Acceleration: 3.3 km/(h⋅s) (2.1 mph/s)
- Deceleration: 3.3 km/(h⋅s) (2.1 mph/s)
- Power supply: 440 V AC generator (PNR)
- HVAC: AU75G (JNR, JR East, KRL, and PNR); ACI-4202 (PNR; 2 sets)
- Electric systems: 1,500 V DC overhead catenary (JNR, JR East and KAI Commuter)
- Current collection: PS21 pantograph (JNR, JR East and KAI Commuter)
- Bogies: DT46A (motor), TR234 (trailer)
- Safety systems: ATS-Sn, ATC-10 (JNR, JR East)
- Coupling system: Shibata and knuckle
- Track gauge: 1,067 mm (3 ft 6 in)

The 203 series (203系) is an electric multiple unit (EMU) train type operated in Japan between 1982 and 2011 by Japanese National Railways (JNR) and later by East Japan Railway Company (JR East), formerly operated by KAI Commuter between 2011 and 2025, and currently operated by the Philippine National Railways since 2011.

== Formation ==
The sets were formed as follows.

	Original 10-car EMU configuration									
Car No.	1	2	3	4	5	6	7	8	9	10
Numbering	KuHa 202	MoHa 202	MoHa 203	SaHa 203	MoHa 202	MoHa 203	SaHa 203	MoHa 202	MoHa 203	KuHa 203

Cars 3, 6, and 9 were each fitted with one PS21 pantograph.

== Interior ==
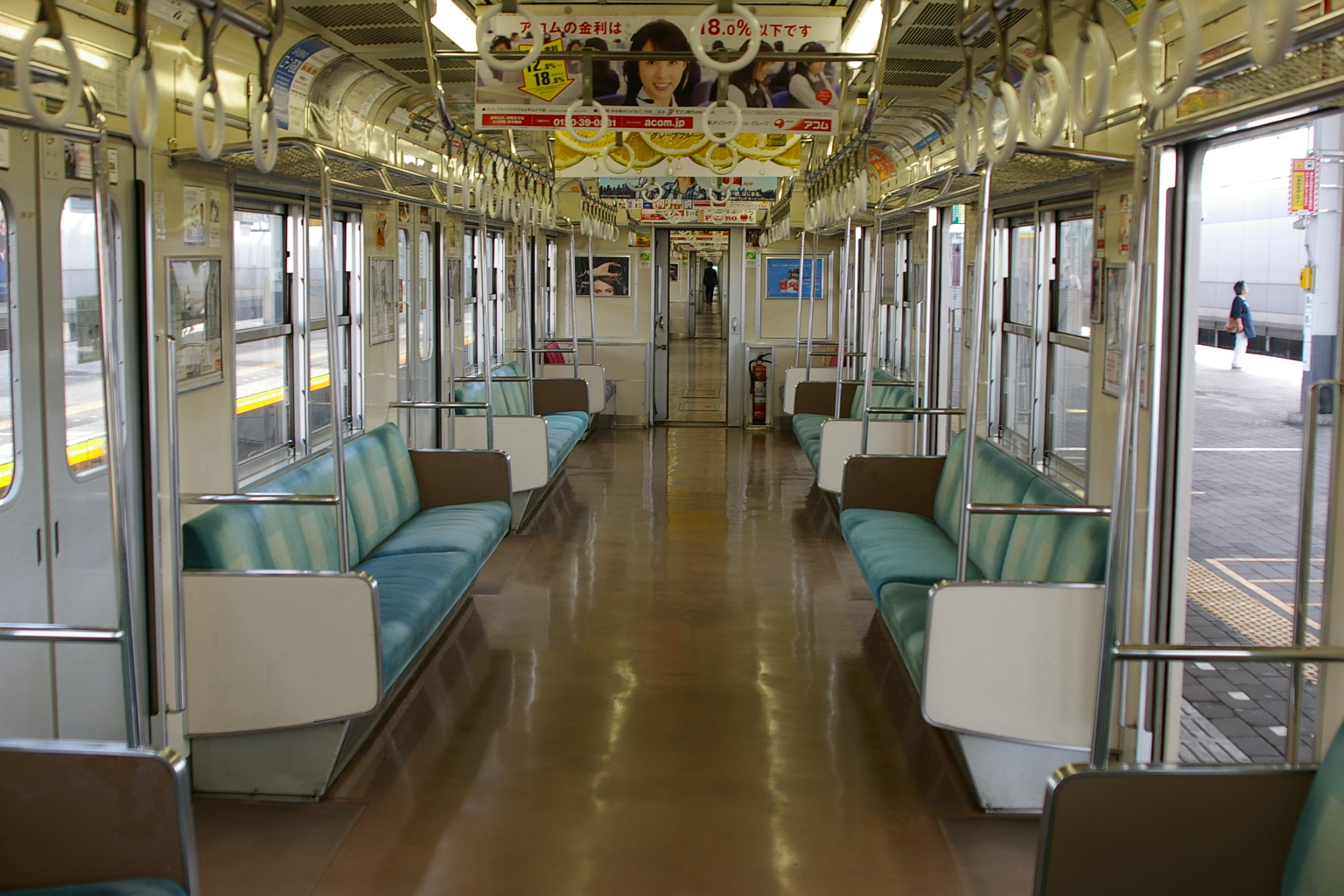
Interior view in September 2007

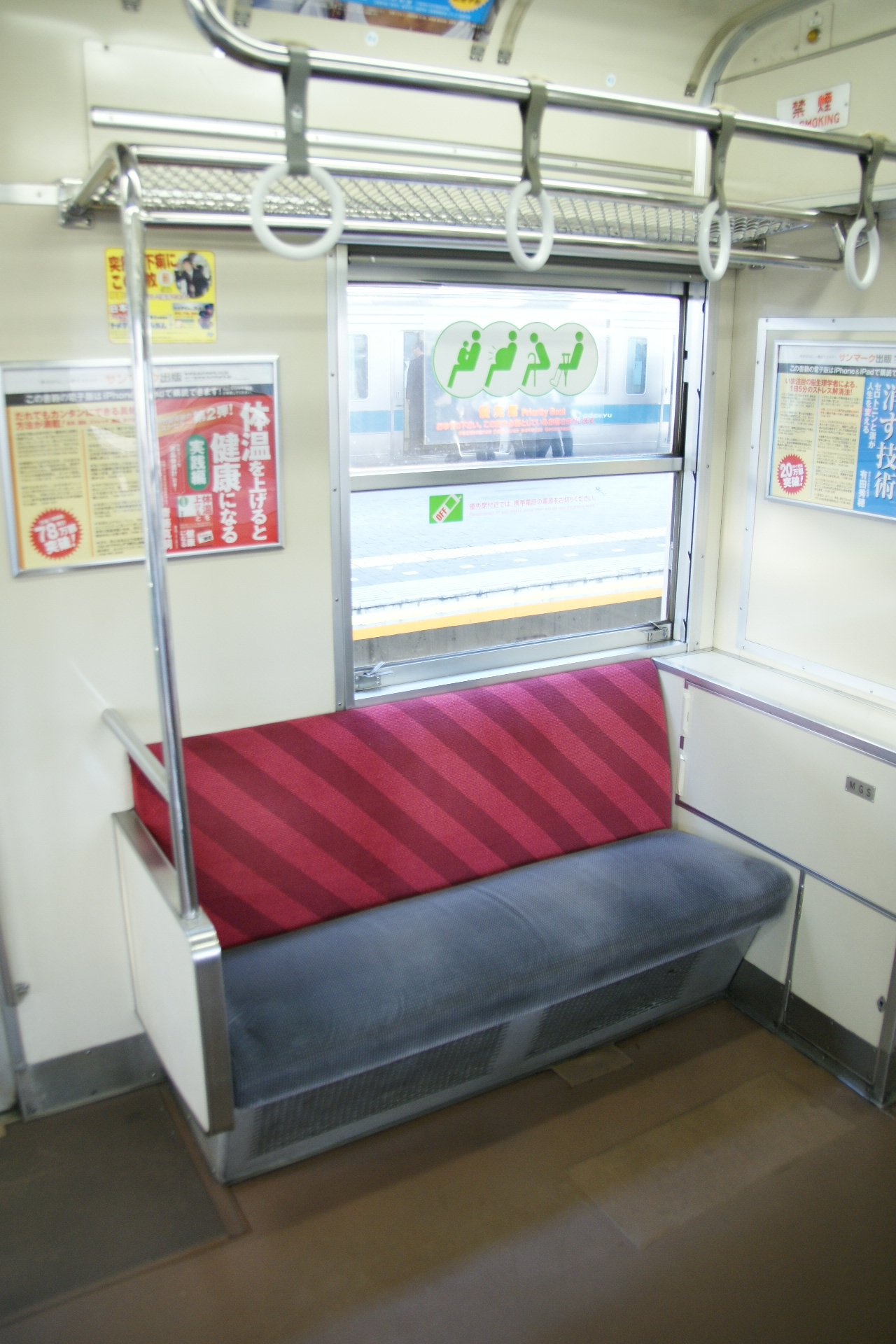
Priority seating in November 2010

== History and operations ==
The 203 series sets were made to replace the 103-1000 series EMUs in 1982. The 203 series EMUs were on through services between the Joban Line and Tokyo Metro Chiyoda Line.

=== Withdrawal ===
The trains were gradually replaced by new E233-2000 series EMUs, and the last set ran in revenue service on 26 September 2011.

== Overseas operations ==
=== Indonesia ===
Five former 203 series ten-car sets (Set numbers 51, 52, 66, 68, 69) were shipped to KAI Commuter in Jakarta, Indonesia in 2011. The trainsets were subsequently reformed to create four trainsets formed as one eight-car set (set 108), two ten-car sets (sets 106 and 109), and one twelve-car set (set 2). One ten-car set, set 109, has 5+5 formation with two middle driving trailers which are used only during regular maintenance. The set 203-106 is the first 203 series to bear the latest KAI Commuter red-white livery, while the set 203-109 (5+5 trainsets) are bearing the latest KAI Commuter livery in September 2023.

On 11 November 2025, the 203 series officially retired after KAI Commuter, together with IRPS (Indonesian Railway Preservation Society), held a last run event alongside the Tokyo Metro 7000 series and Tokyu 8500 series at Jakarta Kota station.

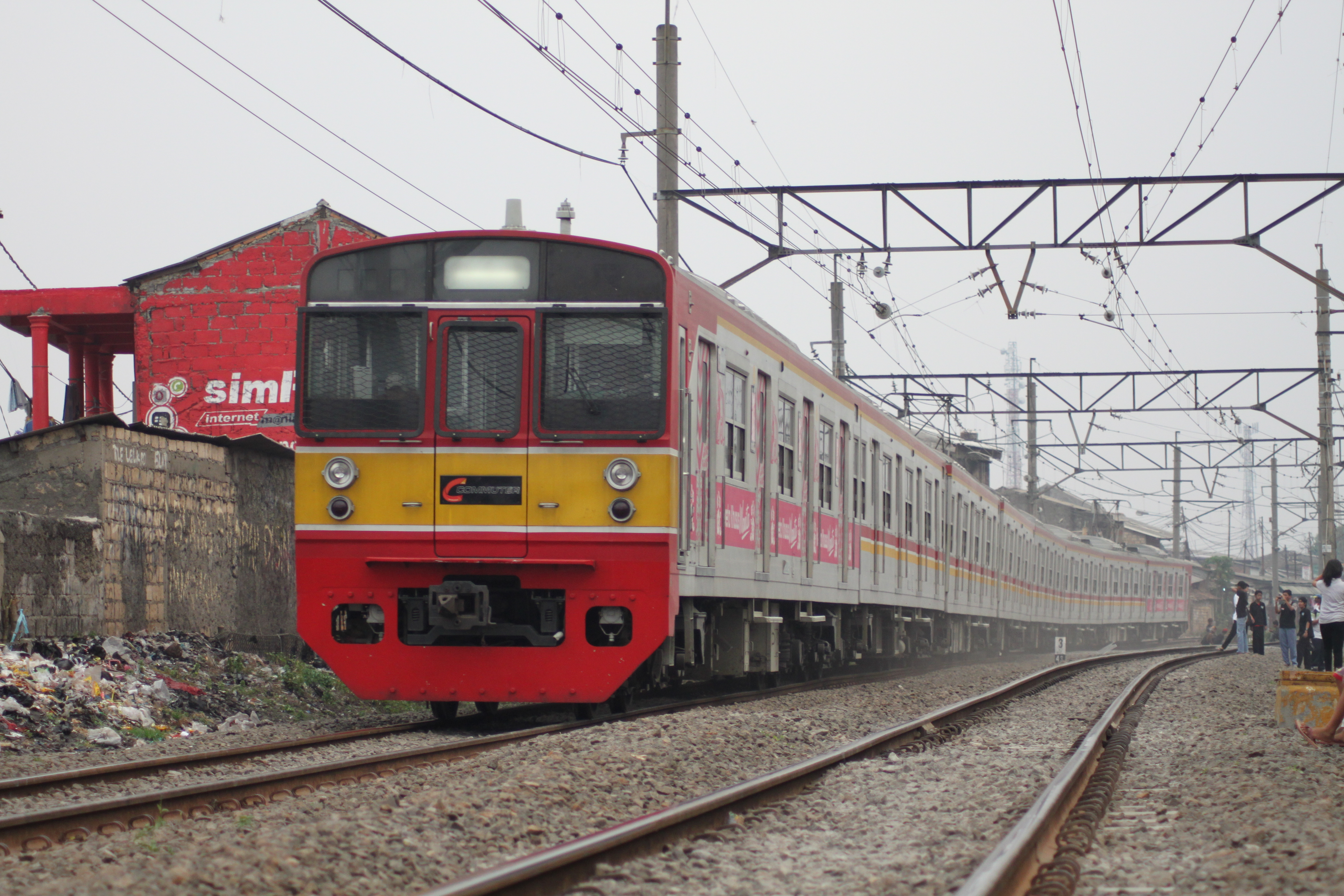
A KRL Jabodetabek 203 series 8-car set on the Bogor Line in July 2012

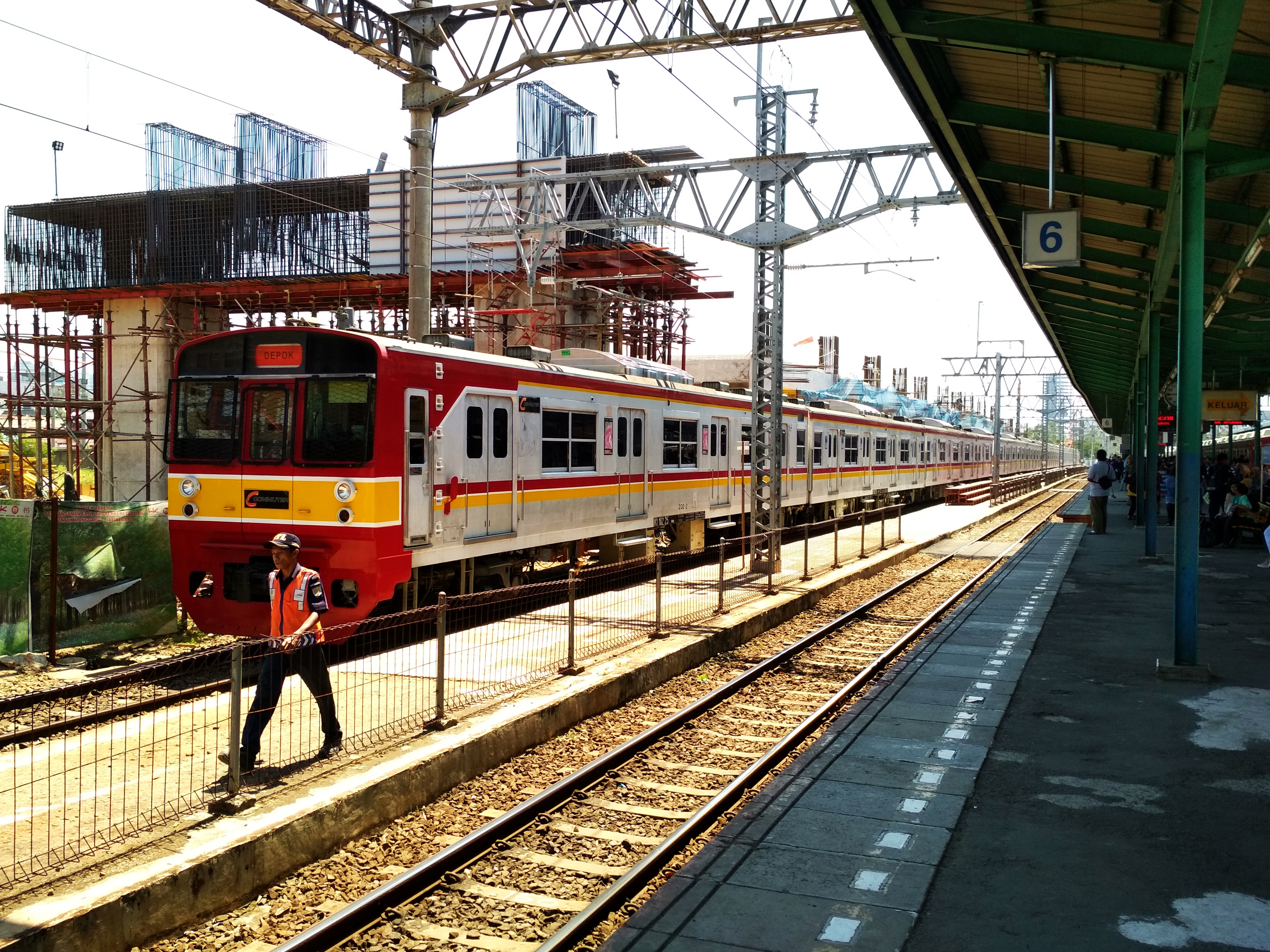
Former set 52 reformed as a 12-car set BUD 2 in August 2017

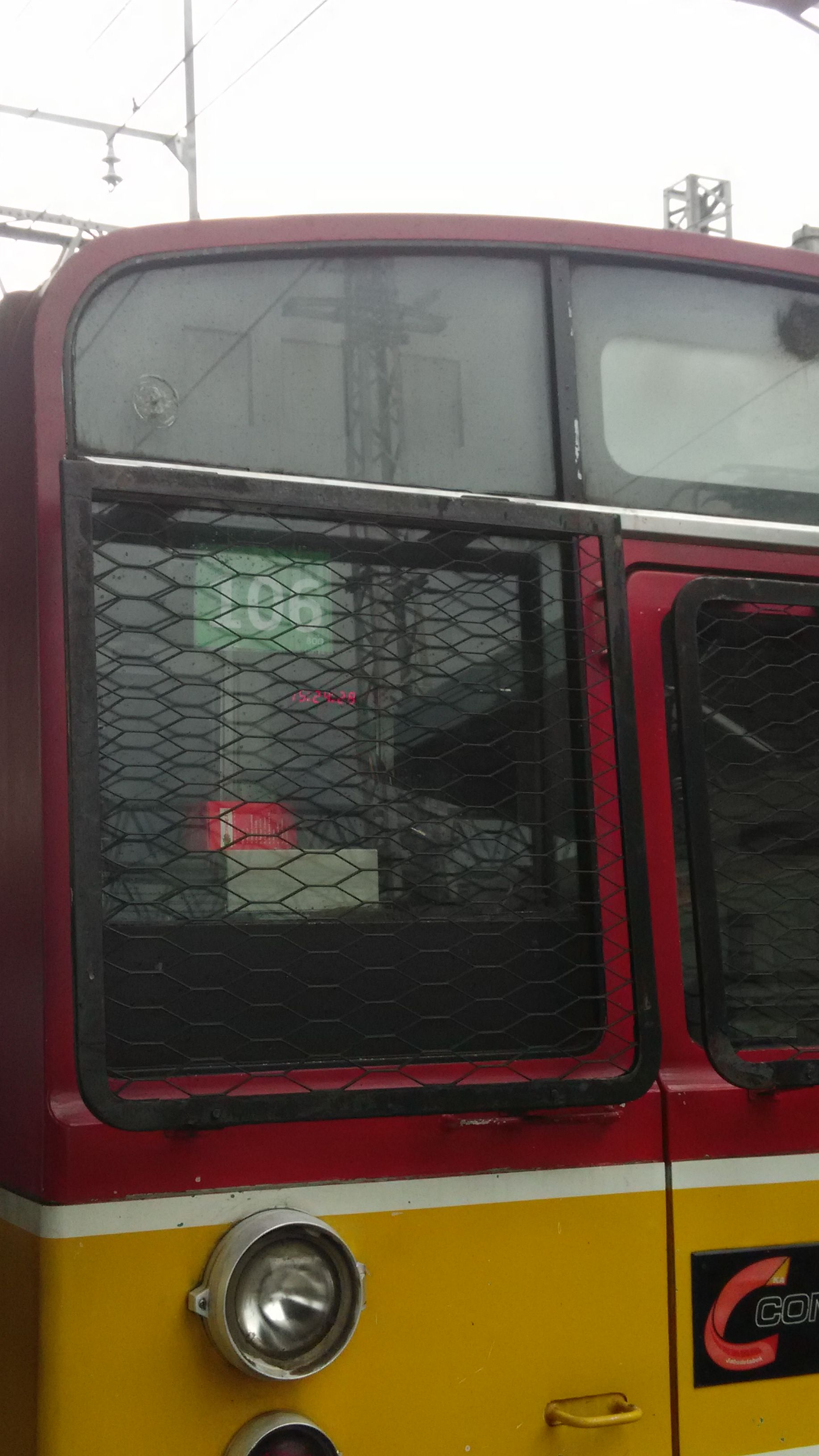
A typical Indonesian set code used on KAI Commuter 203 series set BOO 106 shows the head car's number in December 2017

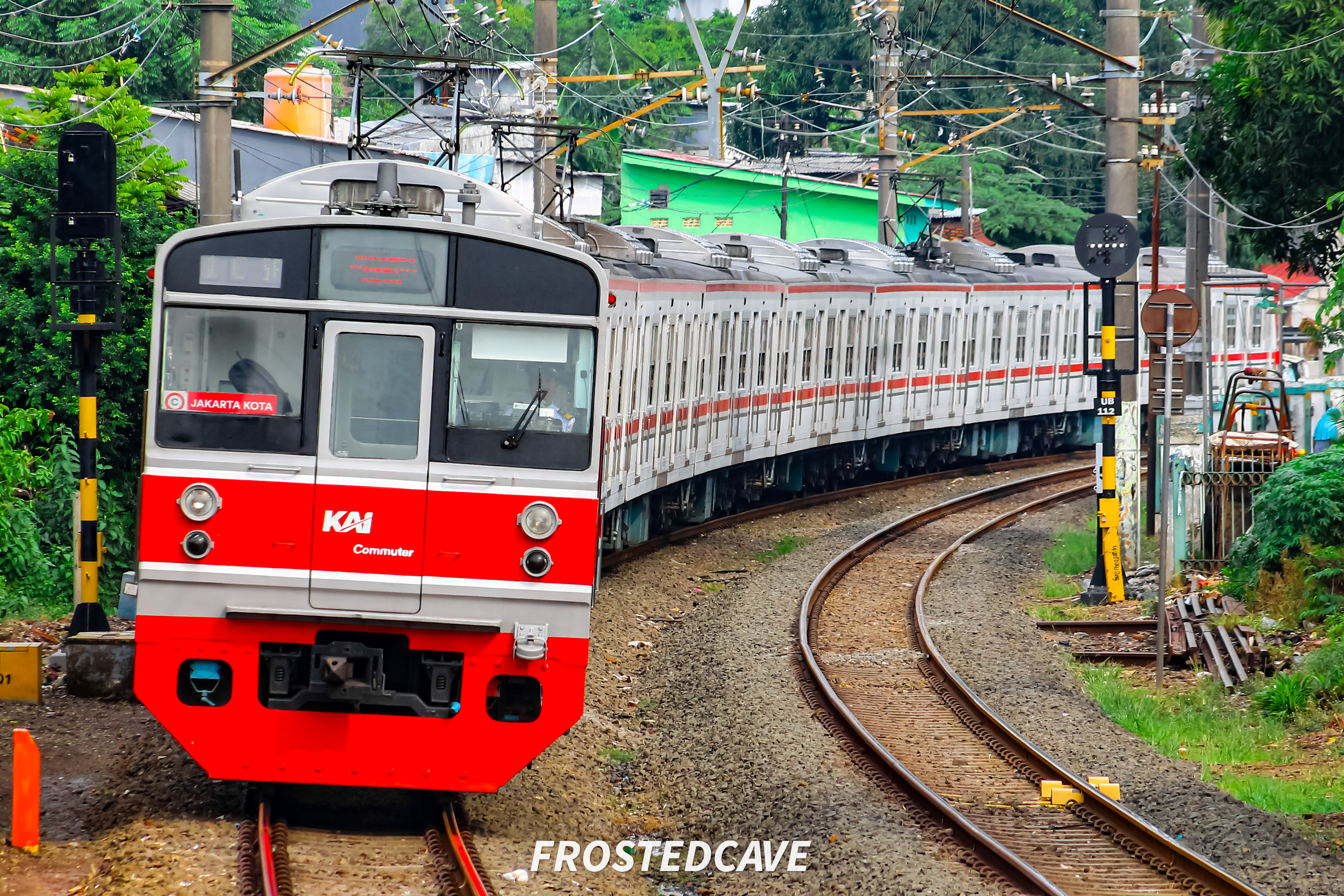
JR 203 106 new livery leaving the Tebet Station.

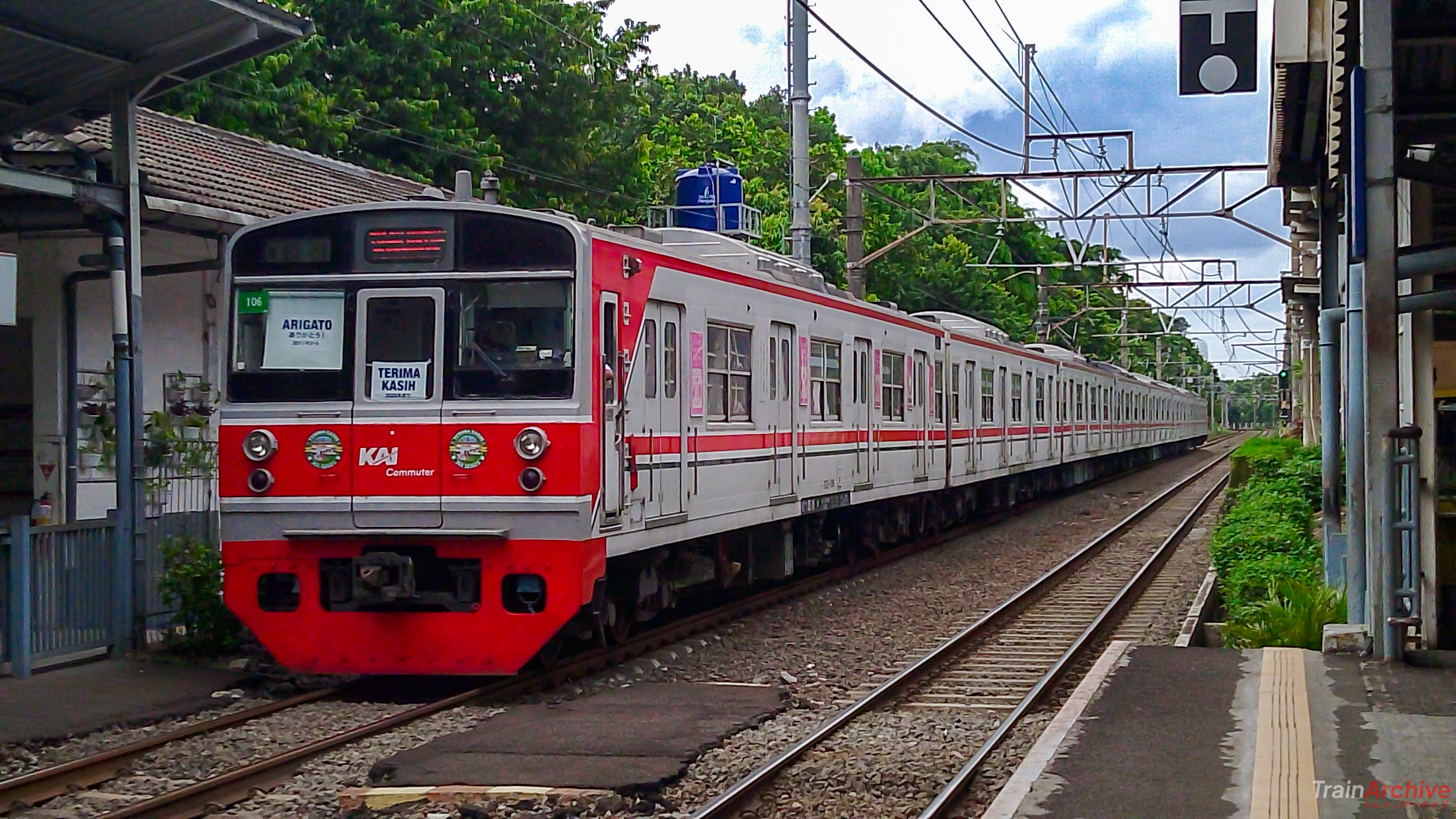
203 series BUD106 set passing through Universitas Pancasila Station after attending its last run event.

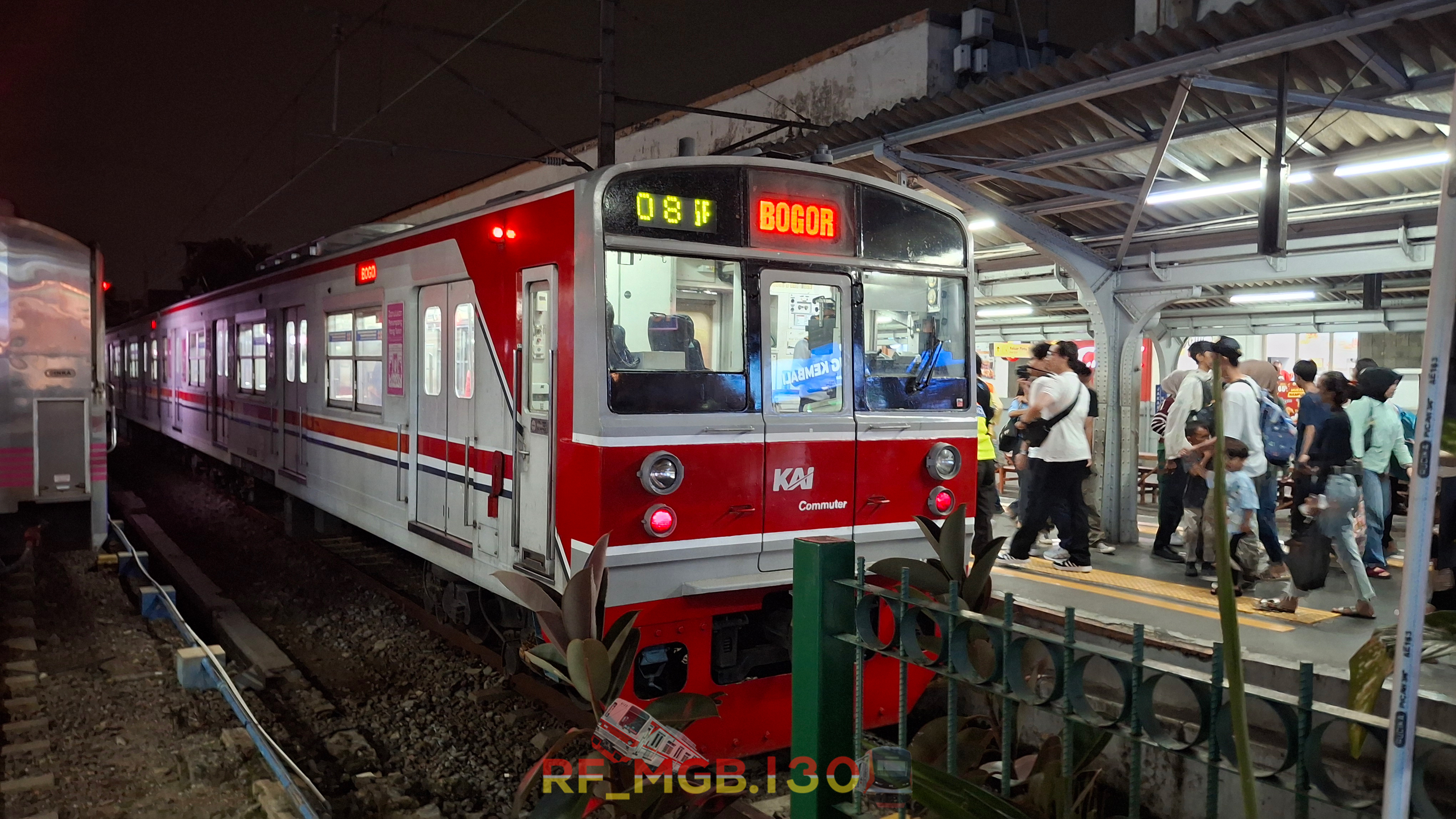
JR203-106 MaTo 66 At Jakarta Kota Station On Platform 10

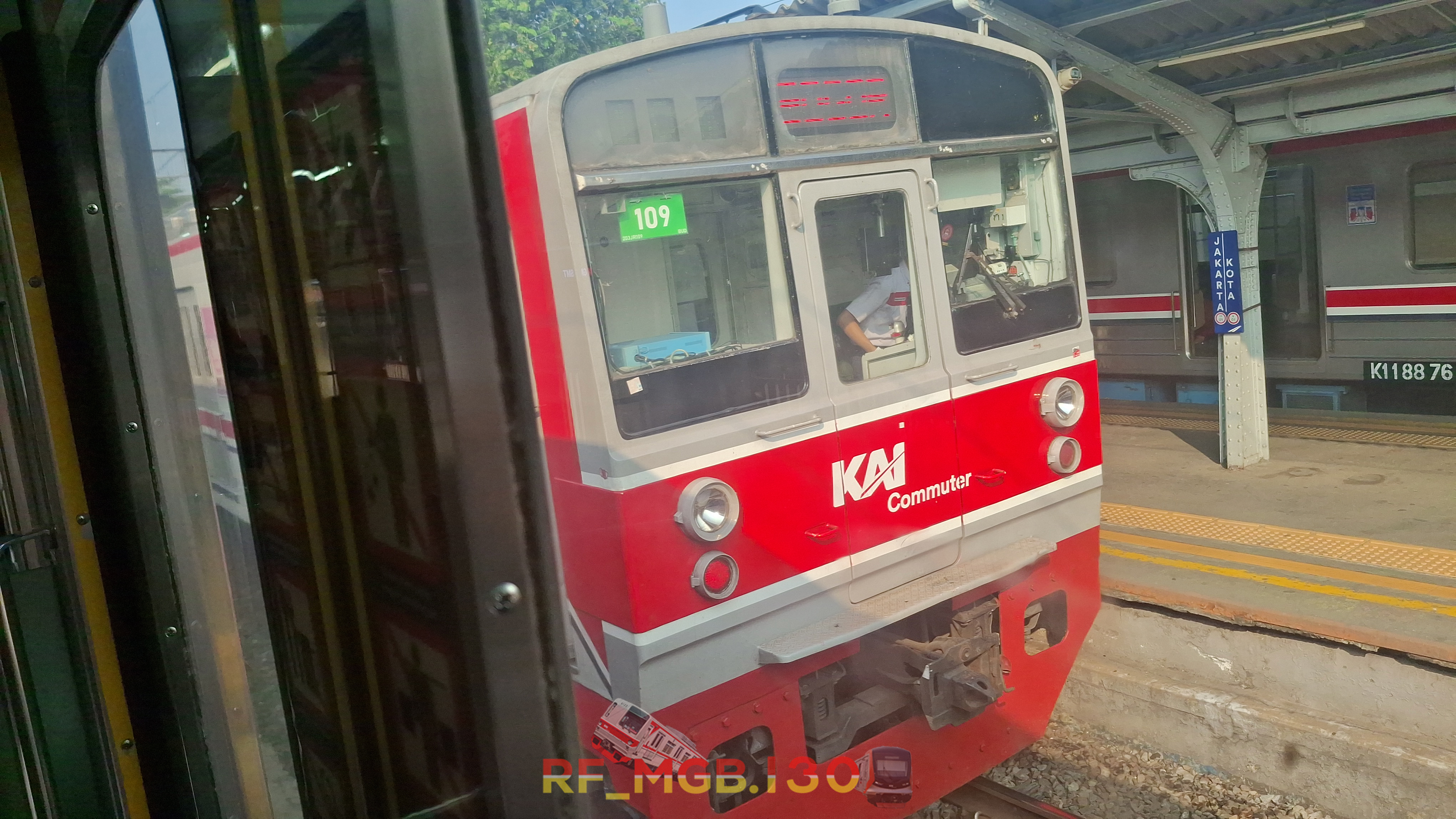
JR203-109+108 MaTo 69 Departing From Jakarta Kota Station On Platform 10 Before This train was Derailed Incident On Railway Switching At Jakarta Kota Station

=== Philippines ===
In November 2011, four former 203 series 10-car sets (set numbers 53, 54, 55, 67) were shipped to the Philippine National Railways (PNR) in the Philippines for Metro commuter service in Metro Manila, replacing former Japanese 12 and 14 series coaches. As of October 2013, seven four-car sets had been formed, as shown below, with car "A" at the Alabang end. Due to the lack of electrification in the PNR line, the units are equipped with a diesel-powered generator at the head car to provide power for the doors, lighting, and air-conditioning. They were usually hauled by 900 class locomotives for commuter service. The 2500 class and the 5000 class locomotives shunts the 203 series EMU in Tutuban for refueling.

EMU configurations as of October 2013
	← Alabang Tutuban →			
Set No.	A	B	C	D
EMU 01	KuHa 203-107	MoHa 203-11	MoHa 202-7	SaHa 203-9
EMU 02	KuHa 202-4	MoHa 202-11	MoHa 203-7	MoHa 202-12
EMU 03	KuHa 203-5	MoHa 203-9	MoHa 202-9	SaHa 203-10
EMU 04	KuHa 203-4	MoHa 203-13	MoHa 202-10	SaHa 203-14
EMU 05	KuHa 203-3	MoHa 203-121	MoHa 202-120	SaHa 203-8
EMU 06	KuHa 202-3	MoHa 202-15	MoHa 203-15	SaHa 203-7
EMU 07	MoHa 203-10	MoHa 202-8	MoHa 203-120	KuHa 202-107

In 2014, PNR started to operate the EMUs in 5-car configuration. As of December 2018, there are five sets in operation. Set 02 is the only 203 series EMU in 4 car formation until 2015.

EMUs 3, 4 and 7 were divided among the other EMUs to form the 5 sets, and their remnants are stored as reserve units or source of spare parts.

EMU configurations as of December 2019
	← Alabang Tutuban →				
Set No.	1	2	3	4	5
EMU 01	KuHa 203-107	MoHa 203-10	MoHa 202-15	SaHa 203-6	MoHa 203-12
EMU 02	KuHa 202-4	MoHa 202-9	MoHa 203-9	SaHa 203-5	MoHa 202-12
EMU 05	KuHa 203-3	MoHa 203-121	MoHa 202-120	SaHa 203-114	MoHa 203-14
EMU 06	KuHa 202-3	MoHa 202-15	MoHa 203-15	SaHa 202-7	MoHa 202-121
EMU 07	KuHa 202-107	MoHa 202-11	MoHa 203-11	SaHa 203-7	MoHa 202-8
EMU 08	KuHa 202-5	MoHa 202-10	MoHa 203-13	SaHa 203-9	MoHa 202-119

By April 2019, the head car of EMU 06 (KuHa 202-3) was transferred to EMU 02. By May 2019, the lead car of EMU 01 (KuHa 203-107) was replaced by EMU 04's head car (KuHa 203-4) and by July, EMU 07's lead car (KuHa 202-107) was transferred to EMU 08.

Due to aging reasons, the air-conditioning units of the 203 series bogged down. PNR conducted a bidding for the procurement of ten air-conditioning units for the 203 series from August to September 2018. PT INKA passed the bidding process, but after post-qualification the lone bidder was post-disqualified, causing a failed bidding. Again, a second bidding was conducted in December 2018. PT INKA once again participated, and passed the bidding process. The company passed the post-qualification process and was subsequently awarded the contract in February 2019. Replacement of air-conditioning units was conducted in February 2020, with the new Model ACI-4202 I-Cond air-conditioning units installed in EMUs 05 and 06. On the other hand, PNR is currently in the process of procuring 15 air-conditioning units for the coaches.

PNR procured polycarbonate panels from PT Industries Incorporated through public bidding in 2019 to replace the old windows of the 203 Series. The contract also covered the replacement of the windows of the Hyundai Rotem DMU, KiHa 350, KiHa 52, and the KiHa 59 (KoGaNe) trains. Replacement of windows was conducted in 2020, with EMU 05 as the first set to have new fitted windows, removing the need of grills. All four active EMU sets have polycarbonate windows.

In summer of 2020, PNR removed the blue livery of EMUs 04 and 07. The management have stripped off the paint and focus on the bodywork progress of the said EMUs (with some instance of revealing their old livery dating back to their JR incarnation). This in preparation for the new livery of the PNR EMU 203 Series.

As of 2025, none of the 5 sets of the 203 series are active due to the closure of the Manila metro commuter line for the construction of the North-South Commuter Railway. However, these sets are expected to return to service following a transfer of operational rollingstock from Manila to the remaining operational lines of PNR in Southern Luzon. While waiting for their transfer, they received numerous livery changes and other repairs in preparation for their next chapter down south.

EMU configurations as of January 2023
	← Alabang Tutuban →				
Set No.	1	2	3	4	5
EMU 02	KuHa 202-5	Moha 202-11	MoHa 203-11	SaHa 203-7	MoHa 202-8
EMU 04	KuHa 203-4	MoHa 203-10	MoHa 202-15	SaHa 203-6	MoHa 203-12
EMU 05	KuHa 203-3	MoHa 203-121	MoHa 202-120	SaHa 203-114	MoHa 203-14
EMU 06	KuHa 202-3	MoHa 202-9	MoHa 203-9	SaHa 203-5	MoHa 202-12
EMU 07	KuHa 202-107	MoHa 202-10	MoHa 203-13	SaHa 203-9	MoHa 202-119

Key

- KuHa: Former driving trailer car
- SaHa: Former intermediate trailer car
- MoHa 202: Former intermediate motor car
- MoHa 203: Former intermediate motor car with pantograph
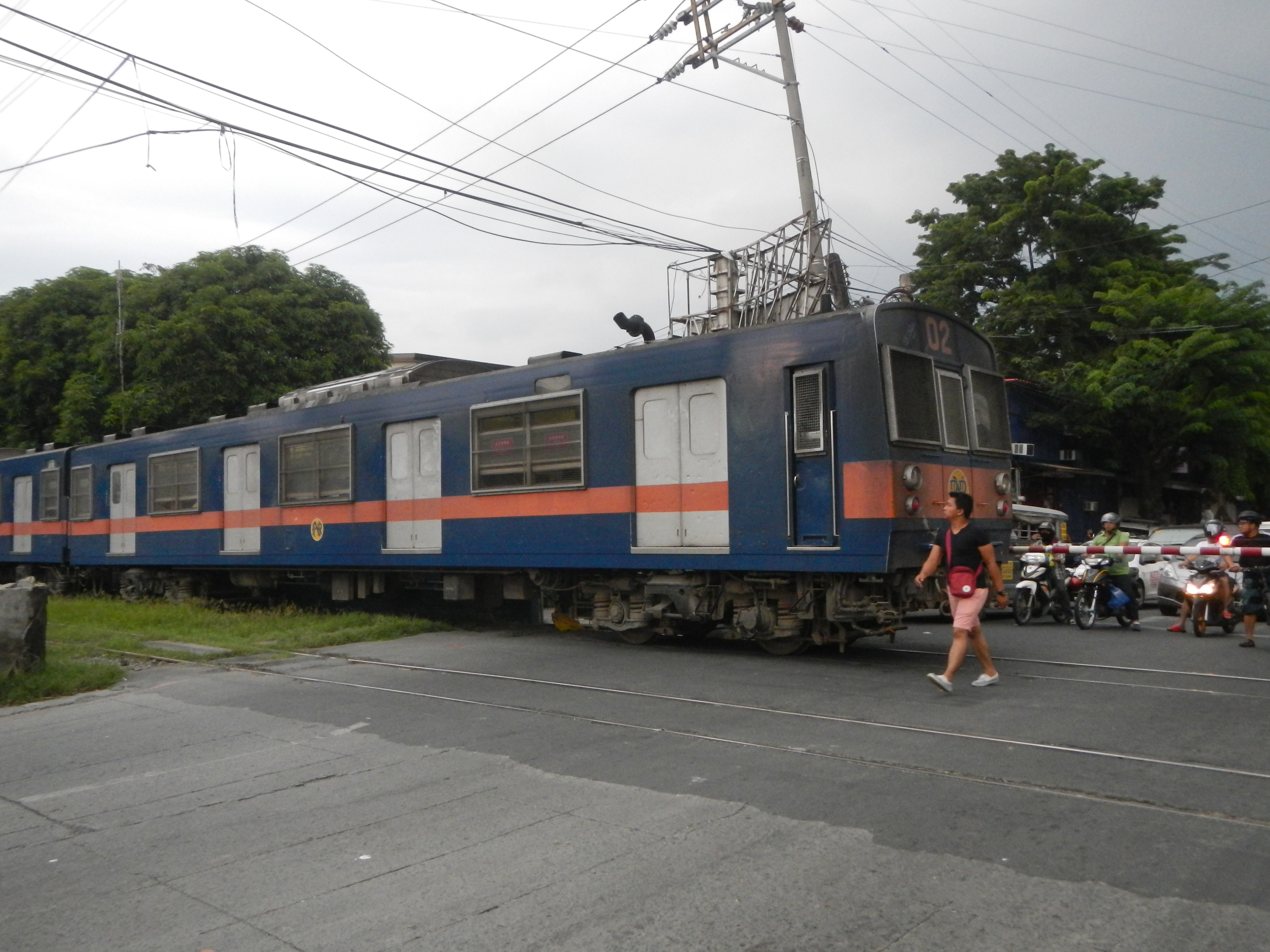
PNR EMU 02 at PNR San Andres Station (July 2016)

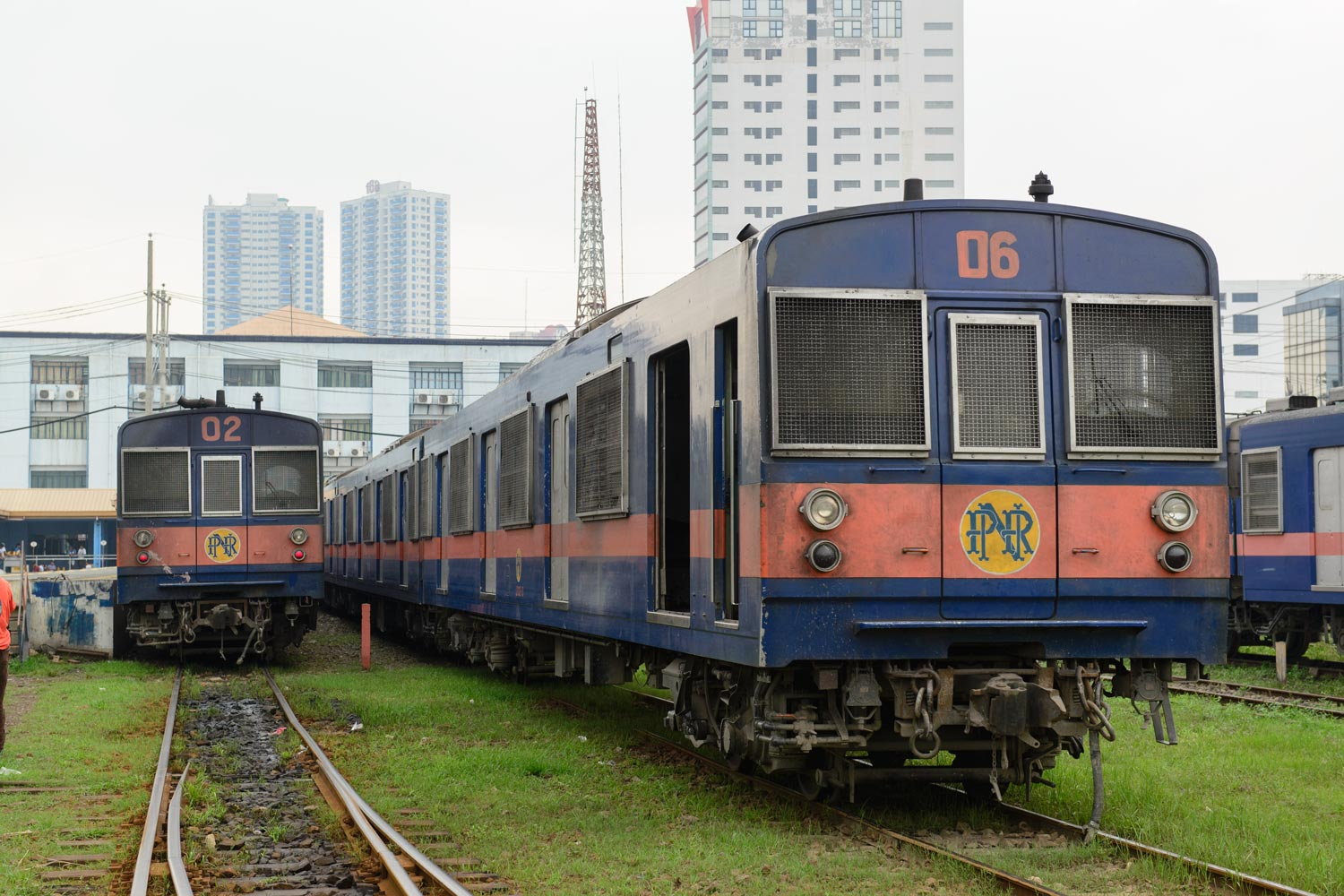
PNR EMU 02 and 06 at Tutuban Station (2016)

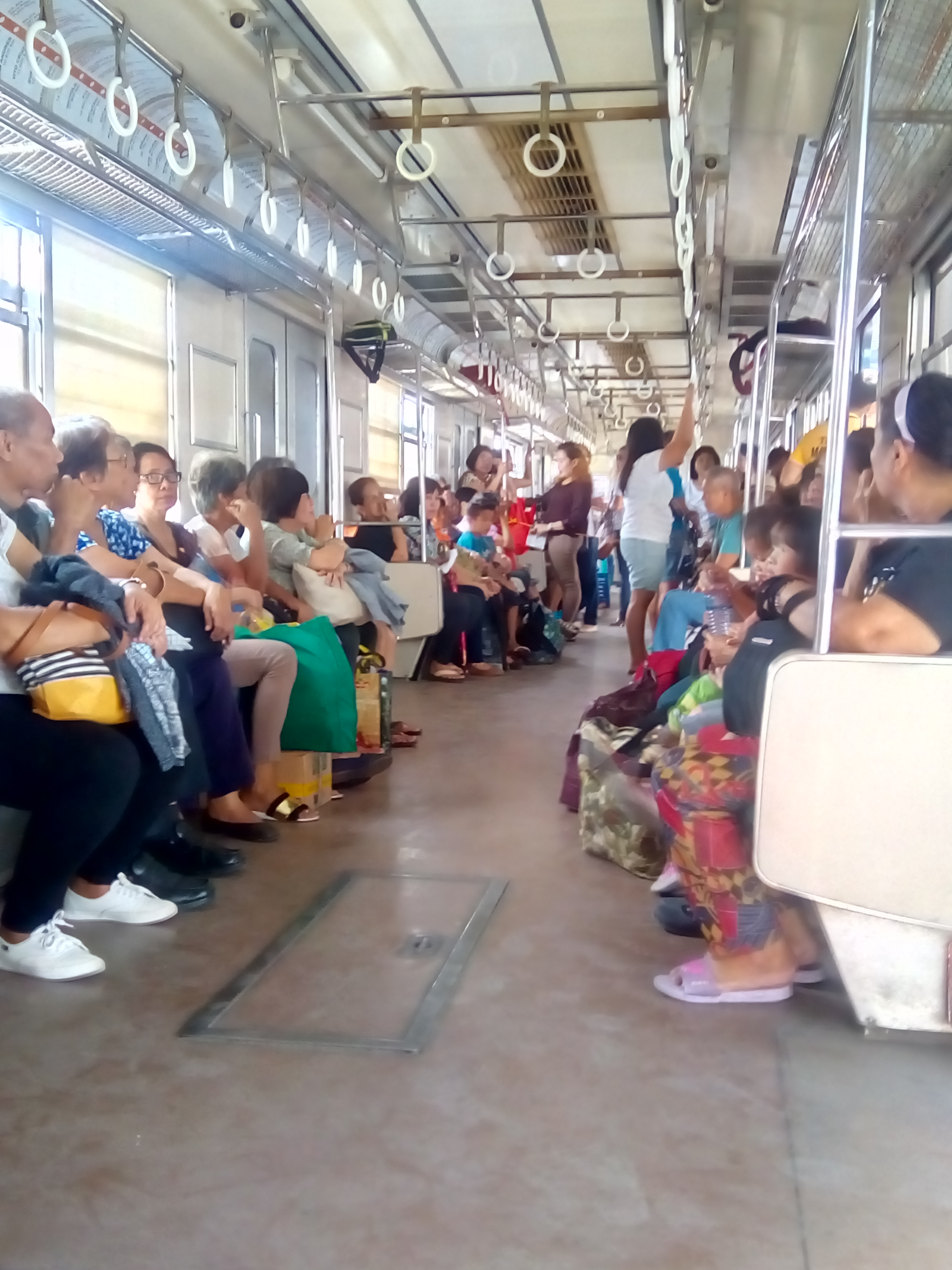
Interior of PNR EMU 203 coach (2017)

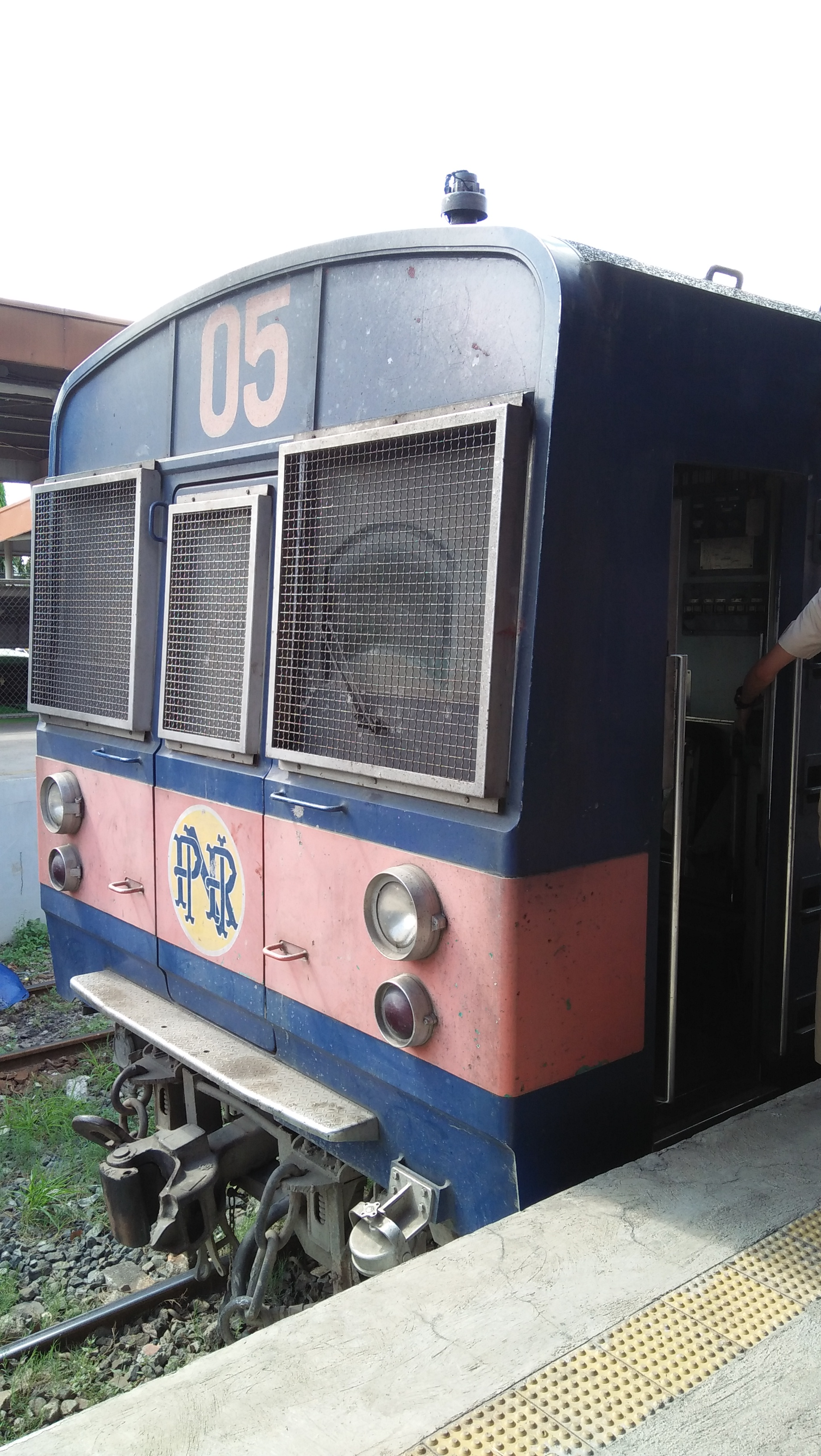
PNR EMU 05 leaving Santa Mesa station (December 2018)

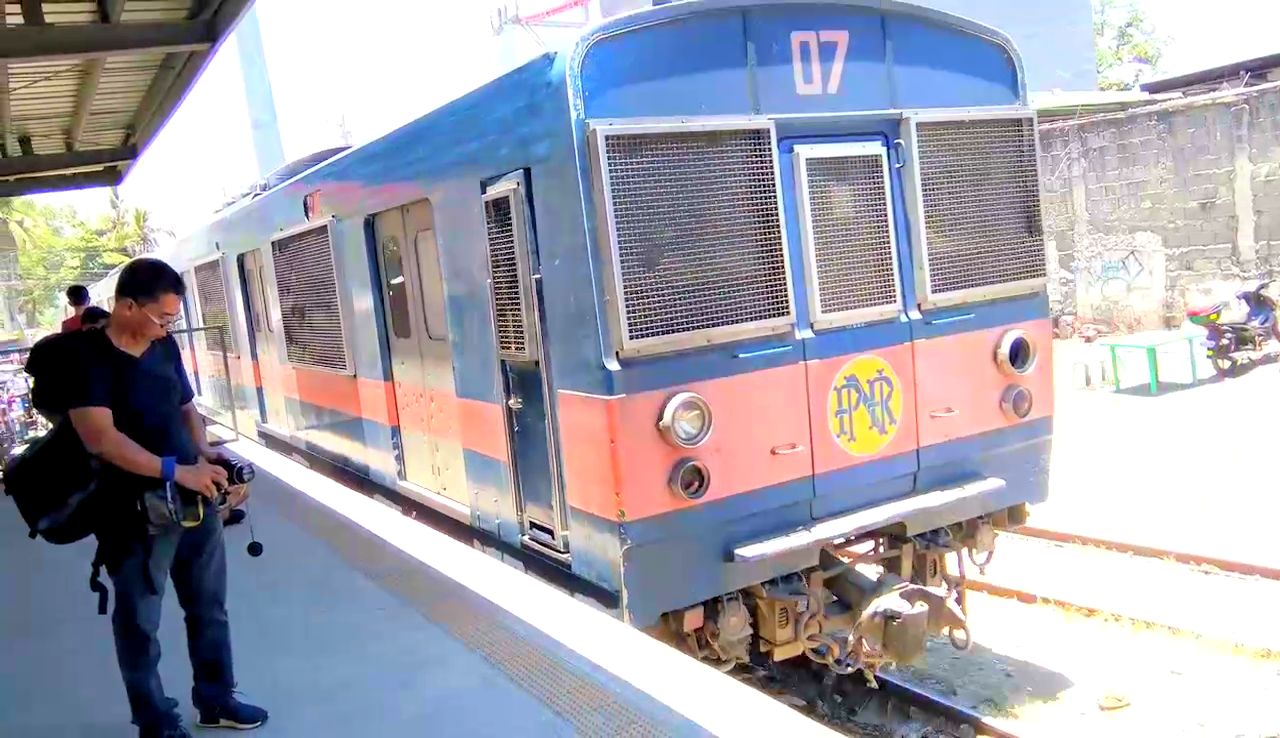
PNR EMU 07 at Alabang (April 2019)

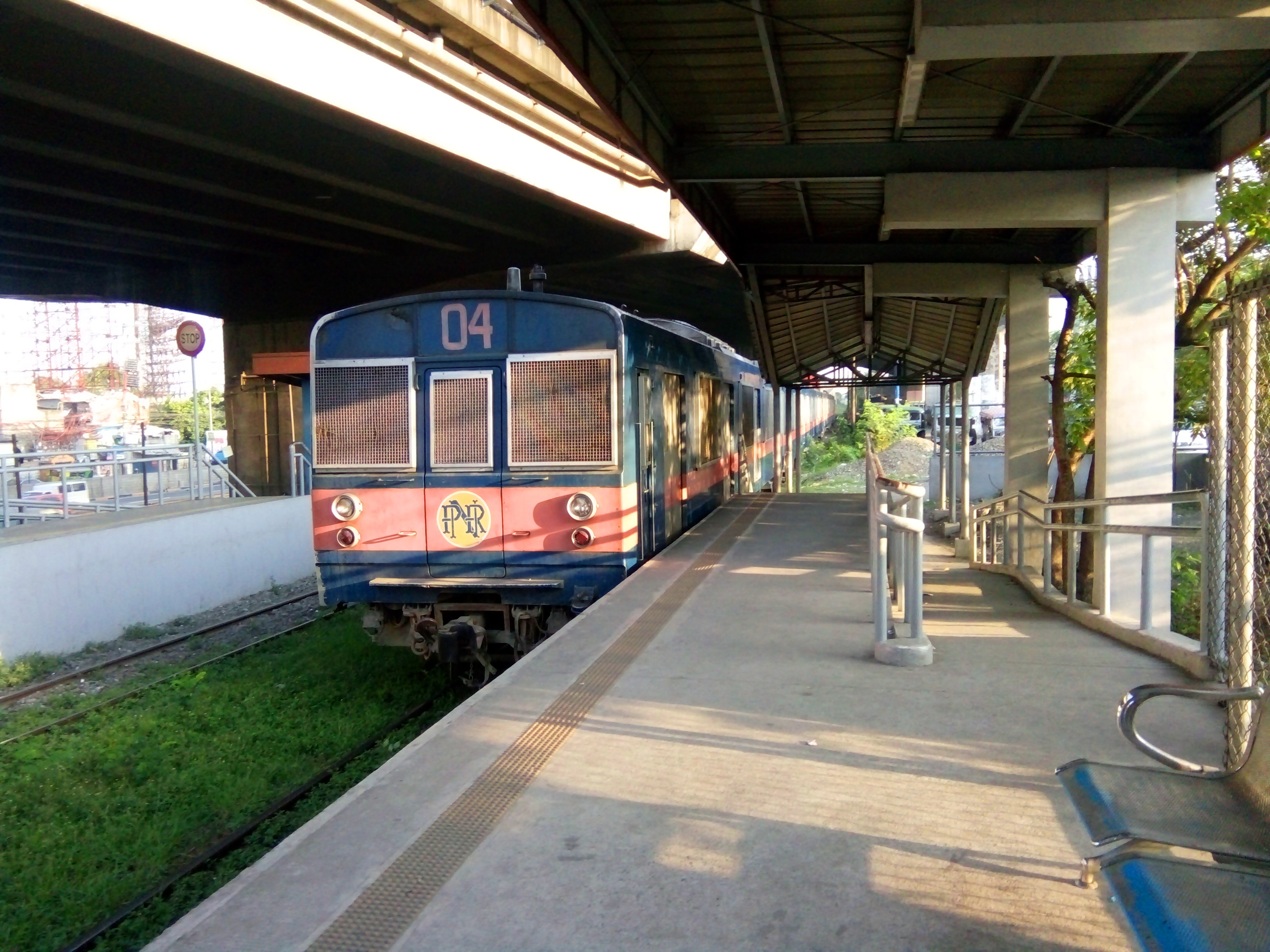
PNR EMU 04 at FTI station (May 2019)

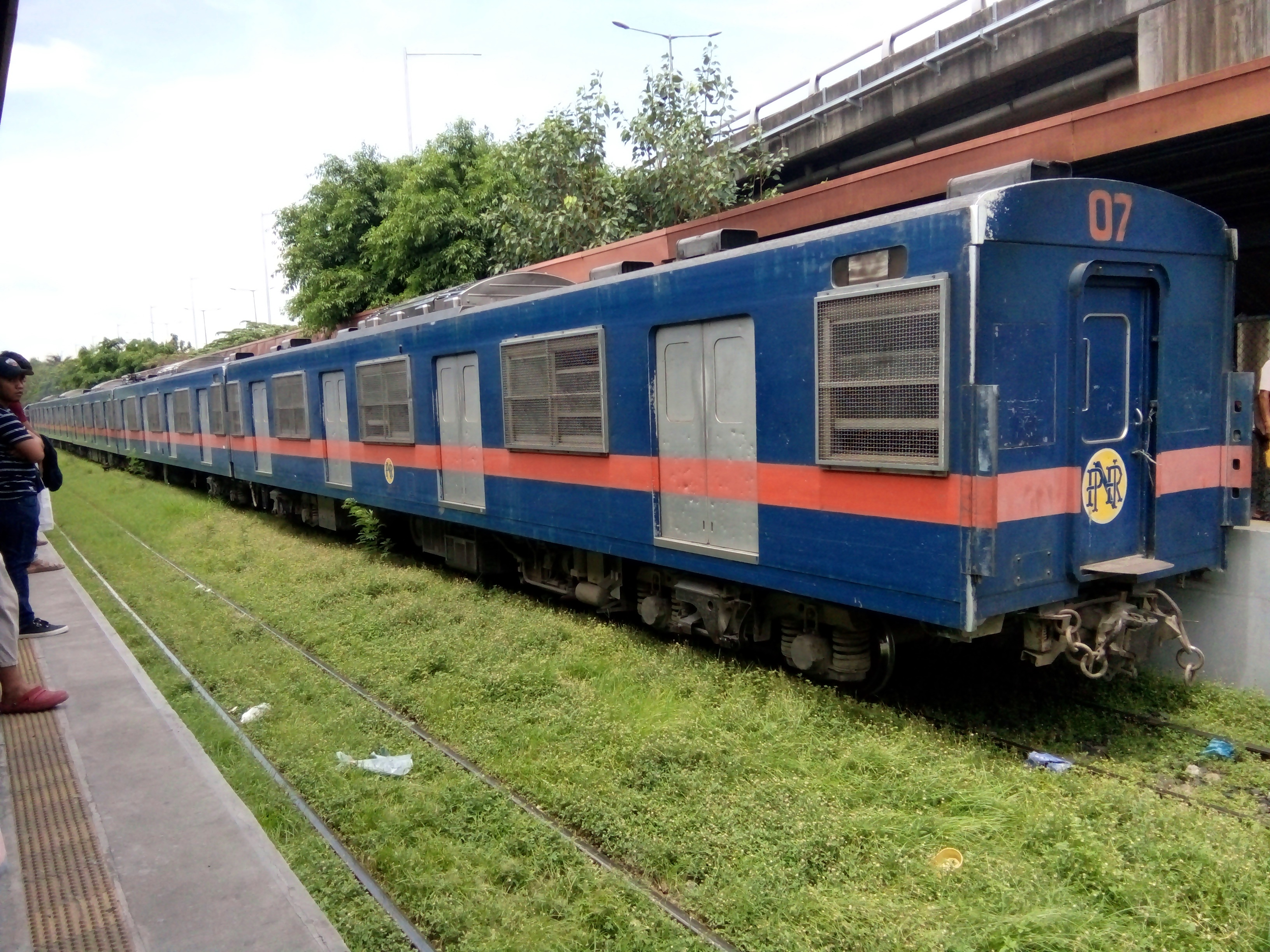
PNR EMU 07 at FTI station (June 2019)

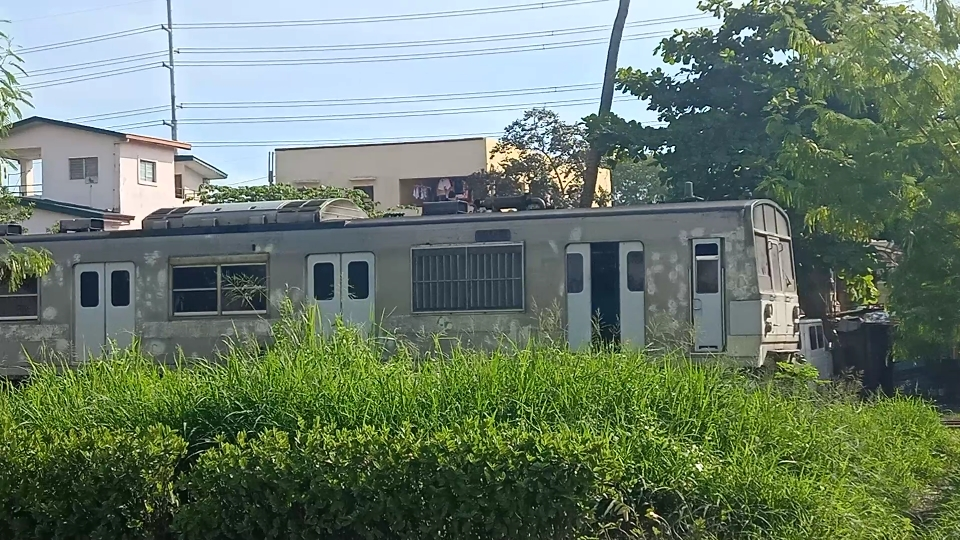
PNR EMU 04 in stripped livery near Sucat station (December 2020)

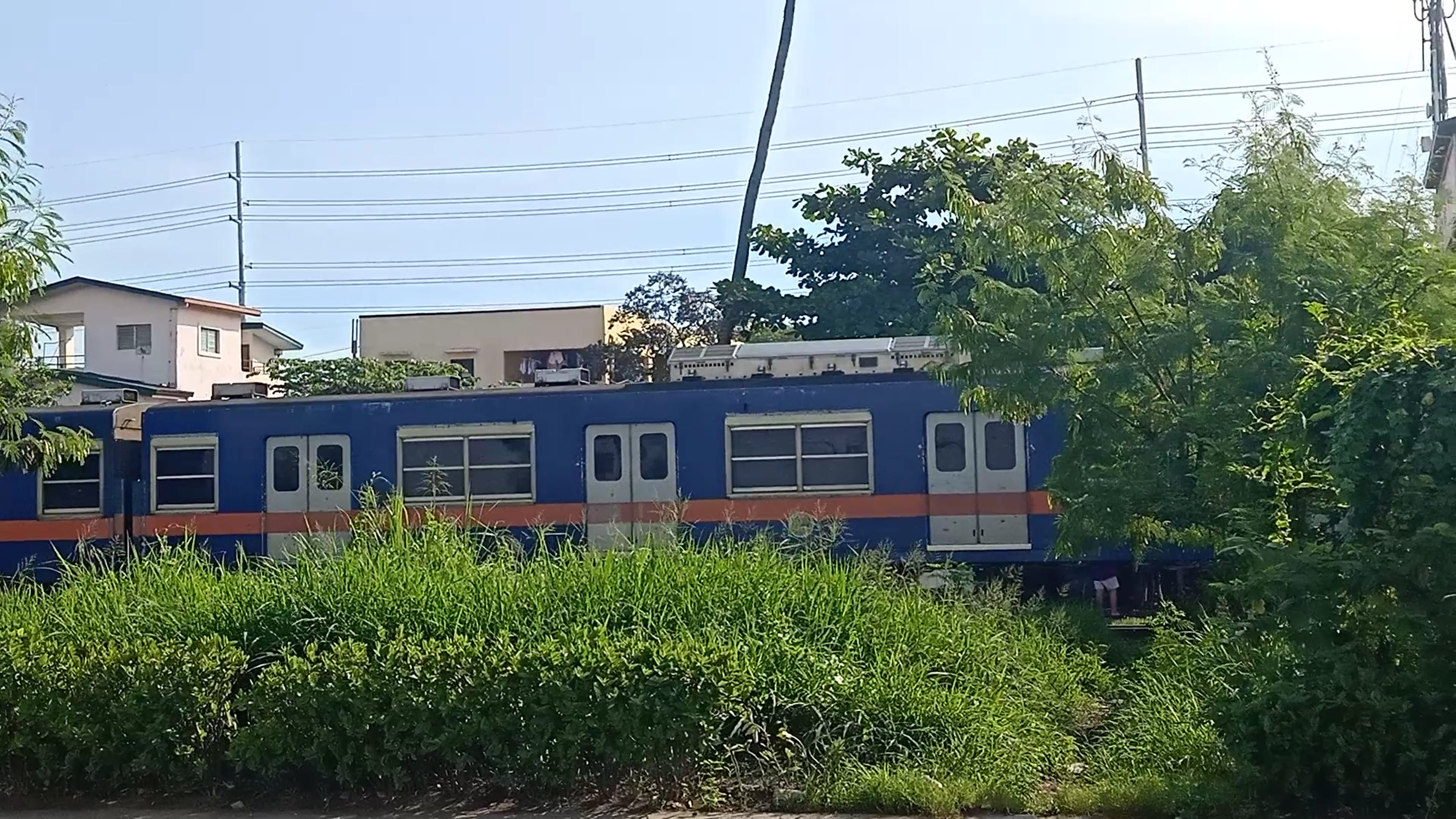
PNR EMU 06 in blue and orange livery near Sucat station, with polycarbonate windows and air-conditioning units from PT INKA (December 2020)

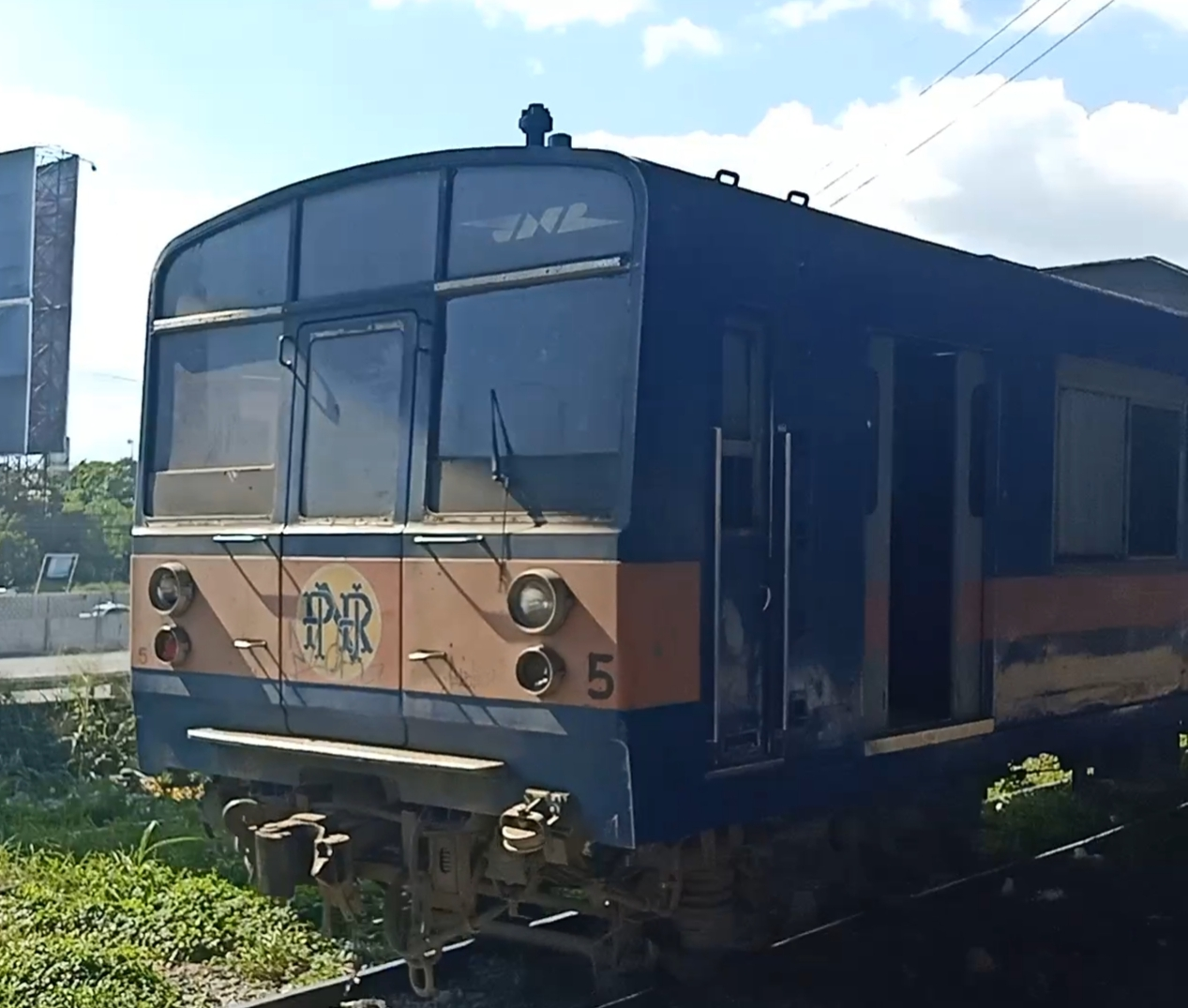
PNR EMU 05 head car with polycarbonate windows, PNR and JNR logos in front cab (October 2021)

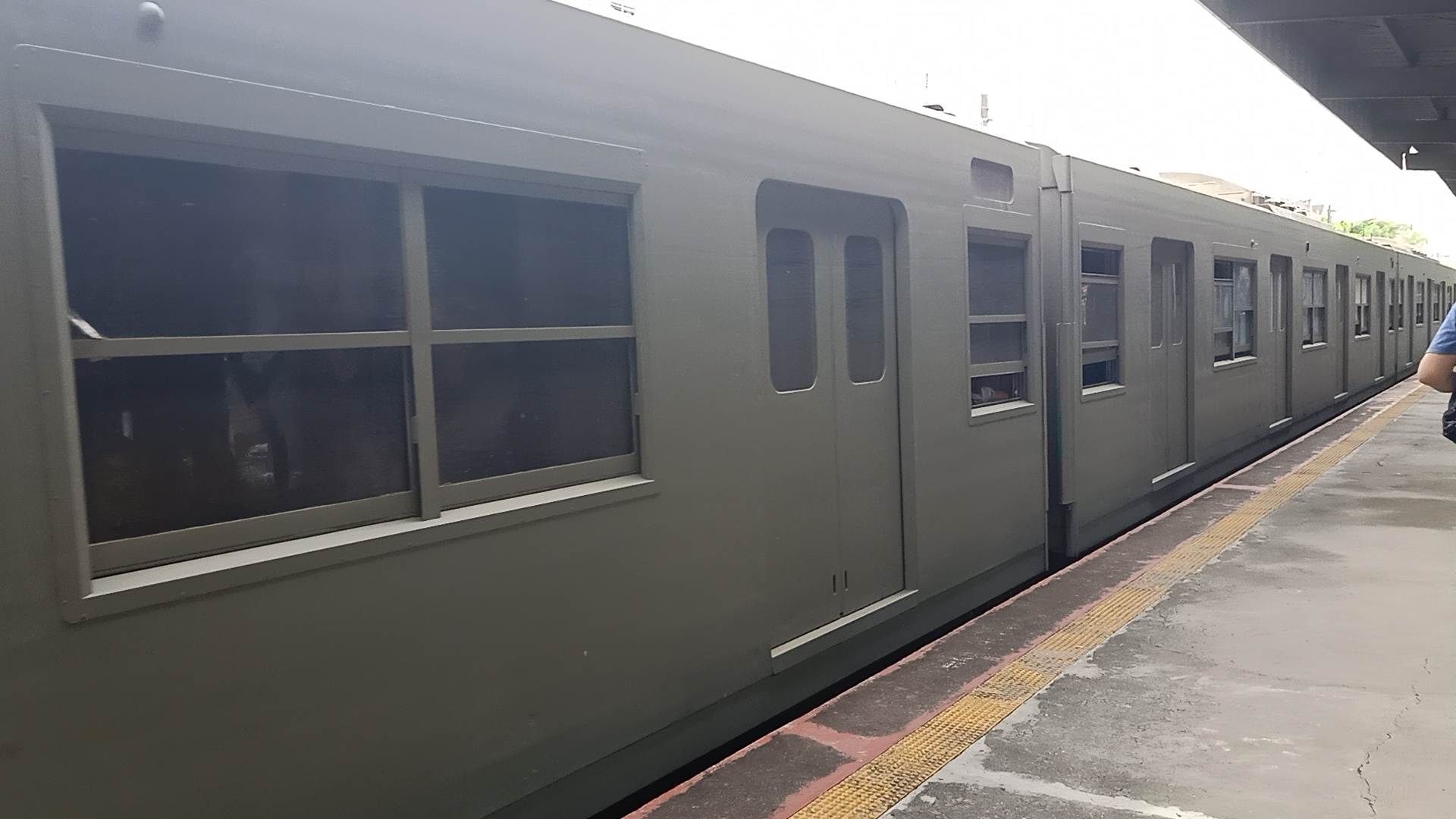
PNR EMU 04/01 in primer gray livery at Santa Mesa station (March 2022)

== Incidents ==
=== Japan ===
- On 20 March 1995, the train number A725K, or the Matsudo Train Set Number 67, which was later transferred to Philippine National Railways in 2011, was involved on the sarin gas attack which happened on the Tokyo Metro Chiyoda Line and two others, on a train bound for Yoyogi-Uehara station at 7:48 AM. As the train approached Shin-Ochanomizu Station, located in the central business district of Chiyoda, one member of the team punctured one of his two bags of sarin, leaving the other untouched, and exited the train at Shin-Ochanomizu. The train then continued down the line with the punctured bag of sarin leaking until it reached Kasumigaseki Station, four stops later. There, the bags were removed and eventually disposed of by station attendants, two of whom died. The train continued to the next station, where it was completely stopped, evacuated, and cleaned.

=== Philippines ===
- On 14 January 2018, a passenger in a 203 series trainset forced a train door open while the train was moving.
- On 16 February 2020, a 203 series trainset was involved in a stone-throwing incident. It damaged a door window and injured one passenger.
- On 12 April 2022, a 9-to-12-year-old child died after being run over by a 900 class locomotive hauling a 203 series EMU train at the intersection of Antipolo Street and Ipil Street in Sta. Cruz, Manila.
- On 18 April 2023, a 203 series trainset was involved in a derailment between Pasay Road station and EDSA station.

=== Indonesia ===
- On 16 February 2022, a 203 series set MaTo 66(203-106) derailed in KM 47+0 Parungpanjang – Cilejit section. No one was injured
- On 28 November 2022, a 203 series set MaTo 52 (203-2/BUD2) derailed twice at Kampung Bandan Station and Manggarai Station. No one was injured.

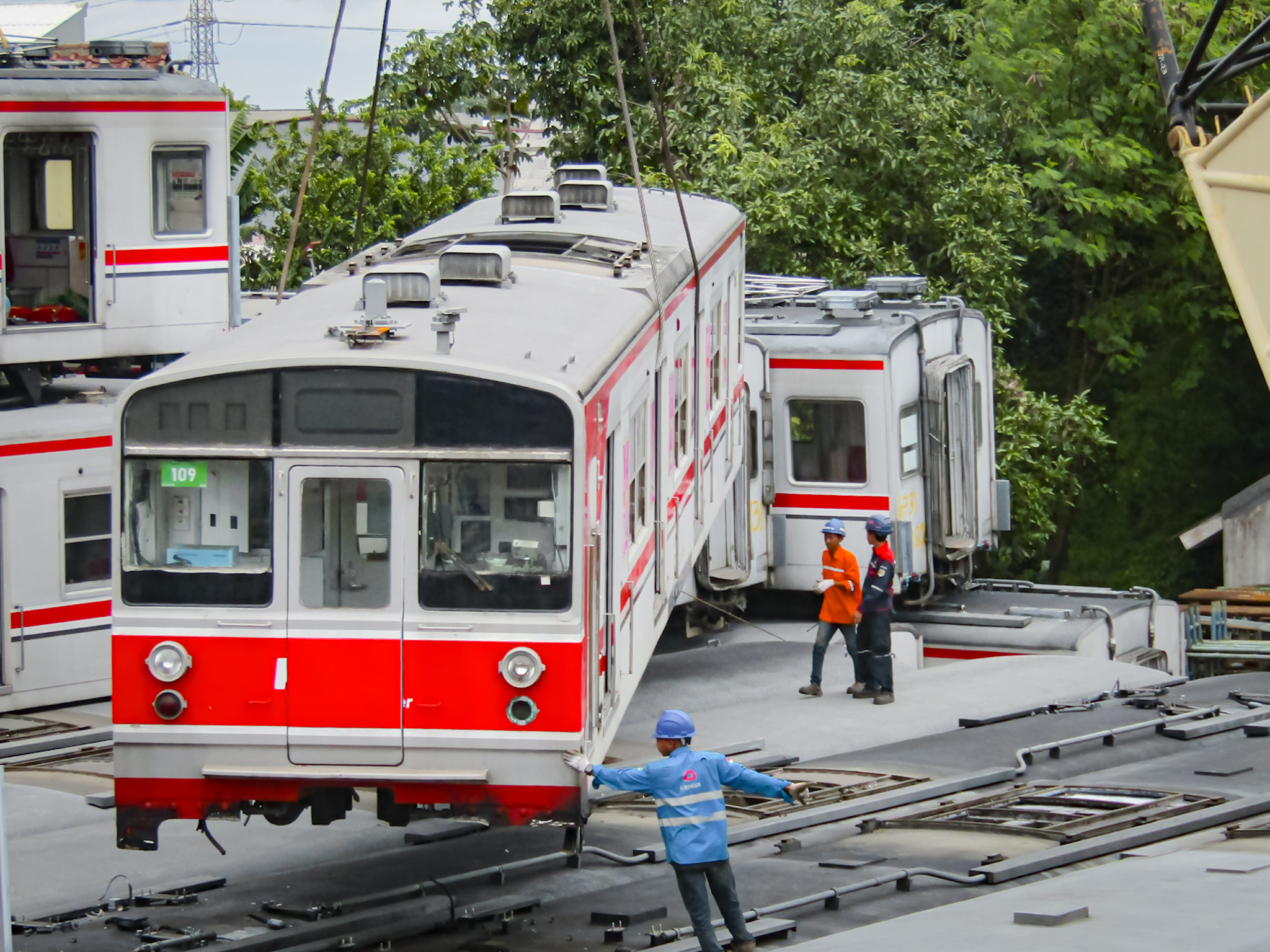
Unspoor process set MaTo 69 (Tc203-109) at Depok Depot

- On 5 August 2025, a 203 series set MaTo 69(203-109) derailed on a railroad switch near Jakarta Kota. No one was injured.
