= Mombasa Air Safari Flight 203 =

2025 aviation accident in Kenya

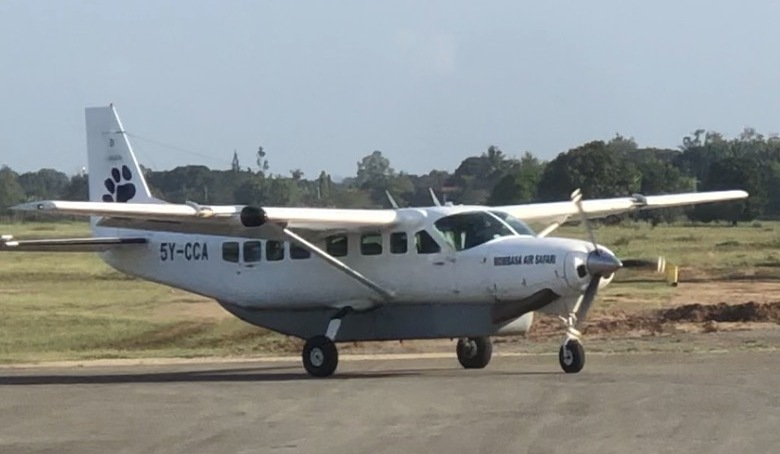
- 5Y-CCA, the aircraft involved in the accident

Accident
- Date: 28 October 2025
- Summary: Crashed en route, under investigation
- Site: Near Kwale, Kwale County, Kenya

Aircraft
- Aircraft type: Cessna 208B Grand Caravan
- Operator: Mombasa Air Safari
- ICAO flight No.: RRV203
- Call sign: SKYROVER 203
- Registration: 5Y-CCA
- Flight origin: Ukunda Airport, Diani Beach, Kenya
- Destination: Kichwa Tembo Airport, Narok County, Kenya
- Occupants: 11
- Passengers: 10
- Crew: 1
- Fatalities: 11
- Survivors: 0

Mombasa Air Safari Flight 203 was a domestic flight from Ukunda Airport in Kwale County to Kichwa Tembo Airport in Narok County, Kenya. The Cessna 208 Caravan crashed on 28 October 2025 near Kwale, killing all 11 people on board.

== Background ==
=== Aircraft ===
The aircraft involved in the accident was a Cessna 208B Grand Caravan registered as 5Y-CCA. The aircraft was manufactured in 2007, and acquired by Mombasa Air Safari in 2013.

=== Passengers and crew ===
The 39 years old Kenyan pilot was hired by the airline just 3 months before the crash; he had a total of 6921 flight hours, of which 5500 were on the Cessna 208. On board the aircraft there were also 10 passengers, eight Hungarian nationals and two German nationals.

One of the Hungarian passengers on board was a board member and president of the boxing program of Vasas SC sport club.

== Accident ==
Mombasa Air Safari could not confirm at which time Flight 203 departed Ukunda Airport, since the pilot failed to contact the departure tower. The aircraft crashed at around 8:30 am local time (05:30 UTC) while en route on a two-hour flight to Kichwa Tembo Airport, located near the Serengeti National Park, a popular tourist destination. Air traffic control tried to contact the aircraft for over half an hour, until the crash site was located about 10 kilometers from the town of Kwale, a hilly and forested area where bad weather, including heavy fog, was present at the time of the accident. Photos show the aircraft wreckage scattered near the crash site and on fire. Rescue services managed to reach the crash site after sunrise. On October 29 recovery operations at the crash site continued, also with the use of an excavator.

== Reactions ==
Shortly after the crash, the chairman of Mombasa Air Safari, John Cleave, released a statement in which he acknowledged the accident and sent his condolences to the families of the victims. An assistance team was also established by the airline.

Hungarian prime minister Viktor Orbán sent his condolences to the families of the victims, and that the Minister of Foreign Affairs is in contact with Kenyan authorities since most of the fatalities were Hungarian nationals of one family. Kenyan secretary of transport, Davis Chirchir, also sent his condolences and stated that safety remains the highest priority in the Kenyan aviation sector.

== Investigation ==
The Kenya Civil Aviation Authority sent investigators to the crash site and started an investigation to find out the causes of the crash. Stephen Orinde, Kwale County Commissioner, declared that investigators are focusing on adverse weather as the possible main cause of the accident. Mombasa Air Safari is cooperating with the aviation authorities in the crash investigation. The KCAA stated that a preliminary report about the accident will be released in 30 days.

On December 3, 2025, the Aircraft Accident Investigation Department of Kenya released a preliminary report on the accident. The investigation has so far found out that the aircraft impacted terrain in a nose down attitude and at a high speed, which led to the aircraft debris to be buried to a maximum of 2.2 meters underground. The report also confirmed that harsh weather conditions were present in the area at the time of the crash. The Kenya Civil Aviation Authority is continuing the investigation and will release a final report once it will be finished.

== See also ==
- Fly-SAX Flight 102 - Another Cessna 208 that crashed during a national flight in Kenya
- Flight 203
