= Daru railway station =

Railway station in Tangerang Regency, Indonesia

R15 Daru station Stasiun Daru
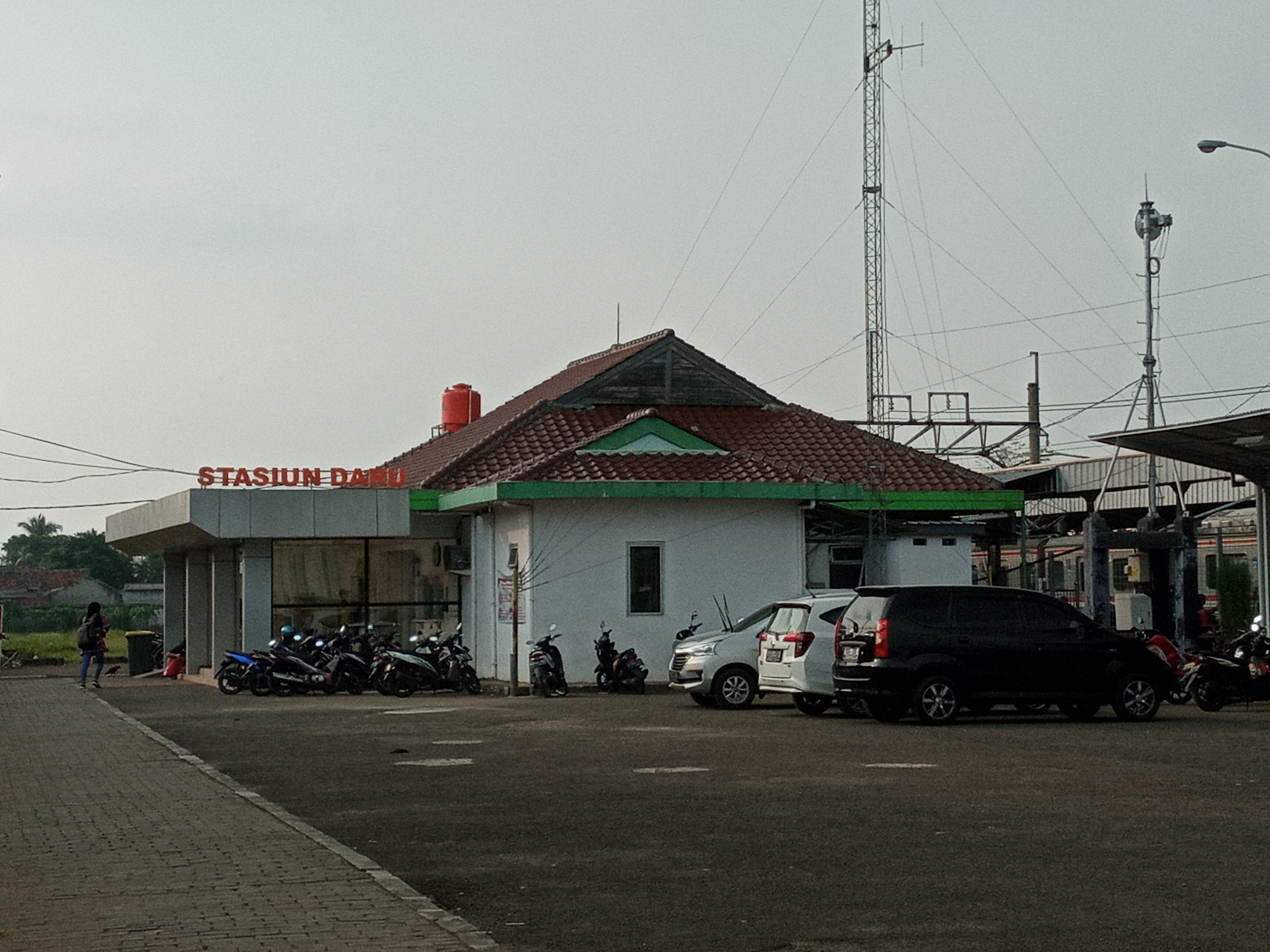
- Daru station building in 2021

General information
- Location: Jalan Sarwani, Daru, Jambe, Tangerang Regency 15923; Banten; Indonesia
- Coordinates: 6.338054°S 106.49246°E
- Elevation: +50 m
- Owner: Kereta Api Indonesia
- Operator: KAI Commuter
- Lines: Rangkasbitung Line; Merak–Tanah Abang
- Platforms: 2 side platforms
- Tracks: 2

Construction
- Structure type: At-grade
- Parking: Available
- Accessible: Available

Other information
- Station code: DAR • 0205
- Classification: Class III/small

History
- Electrified: 2012

Services
Preceding station		Following station
Cilejit towards Tanah Abang	Rangkasbitung Commuter Line	Tenjo towards Rangkasbitung
Location

Daru Station (DAR) is a class III/small train station located in Daru, Jambe, Tangerang Regency, Banten, Indonesia; 44 km west of Tanah Abang in Jakarta. The station, which is located at an altitude of +50 meters, only serves KRL Commuter Line routes.

Only one KRL Commuter Line service stops at this station, which is the Tanah Abang-Serpong-Tigaraksa-Rangkasbitung line.

== Building and layout ==
Initially, the station only had one railroad track and had the status of a bus stop. Since the completion of the double track construction and the extension of the KRL line network per May 2012, the layout of this station was completely overhauled, replaced the building, made two side platforms, and added line 2 as a new straight line towards Rangkasbitung and line 3 as a buffer stop. This station, since April 17, 2013, has been serving Commuter Line (KRL AC) to Tanah Abang Station.

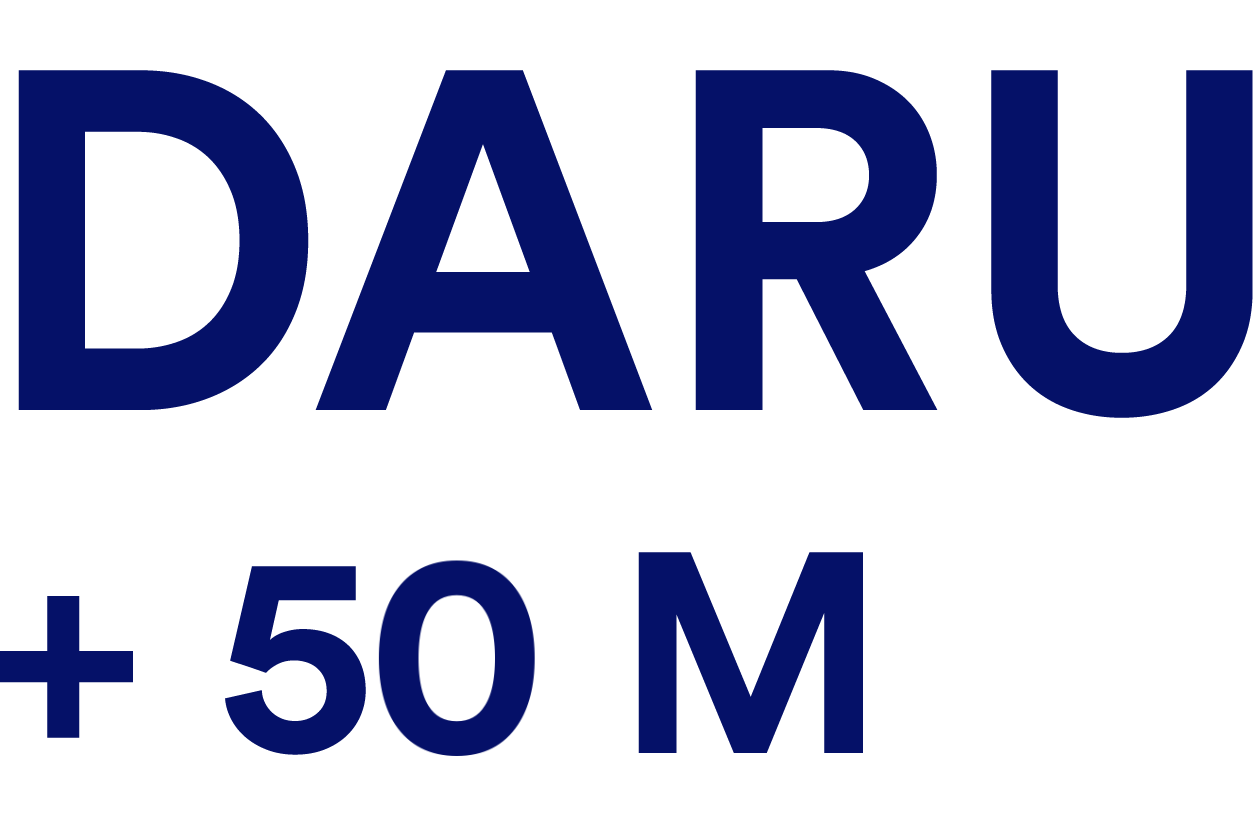
R15
Platform floor	Buffer stop/train parking area	
Platform floor	Island platform, the doors are opened on the right side	
Platform floor	Line 2	← (Tenjo) Rangkasbitung Line to Tigaraksa/Rangkasbitung
Platform floor	Line 1	Rangkasbitung Line to Tanah Abang (Cilejit) →
Platform floor	Side platform, the doors are opened on the right side	
G	Main building	

== Services ==
The following is a list of train services at the Daru Station.

- KRL Commuterline
  - Green Line, towards Tanah Abang and Tigaraksa (Tigaraksa branch)
  - Green Line, towards Tanah Abang and Rangkasbitung (Rangkasbitung branch)

== Incidents ==
On September 28, 2023, there was a fire on the land beside the tracks just south of Daru Station. Station officials and the local community rushed to extinguish the fire. KAI Commuter Rangkasbitung Line was suspended until the fire was extinguished several tens of minutes later.
