= 203rd =

203rd may refer to:

- 203rd Battalion (Winnipeg Rifles), CEF, a unit in the Canadian Expeditionary Force during the First World War
- 203rd General Hospital, activated in 1941 to meet anticipated military medical needs of a country preparing for war
- 203rd (2nd North Wales) Brigade, a formation of the British Army during World War I

== See also ==
- 203 (number)
- 203, the year 203 (CCIII) of the Julian calendar
