= 253 =

253 in various calendars
- Gregorian calendar: 253; CCLIII
- Ab urbe condita: 1006
- Assyrian calendar: 5003
- Balinese saka calendar: 174–175
- Bengali calendar: −341 – −340
- Berber calendar: 1203
- Buddhist calendar: 797
- Burmese calendar: −385
- Byzantine calendar: 5761–5762
- Chinese calendar: 壬申年 (Water Monkey); 2950 or 2743 — to — 癸酉年 (Water Rooster); 2951 or 2744
- Coptic calendar: −31 – −30
- Discordian calendar: 1419
- Ethiopian calendar: 245–246
- Hebrew calendar: 4013–4014
- Hindu calendars
- Vikram Samvat: 309–310
- Shaka Samvat: 174–175
- Kali Yuga: 3353–3354
- Holocene calendar: 10253
- Iranian calendar: 369 BP – 368 BP
- Islamic calendar: 380 BH – 379 BH
- Javanese calendar: 132–133
- Julian calendar: 253; CCLIII
- Korean calendar: 2586
- Minguo calendar: 1659 before ROC 民前1659年
- Nanakshahi calendar: −1215
- Seleucid era: 564/565 AG
- Thai solar calendar: 795–796
- Tibetan calendar: ཆུ་ཕོ་སྤྲེ་ལོ་ (male Water-Monkey); 379 or −2 or −774 — to — ཆུ་མོ་བྱ་ལོ་ (female Water-Bird); 380 or −1 or −773

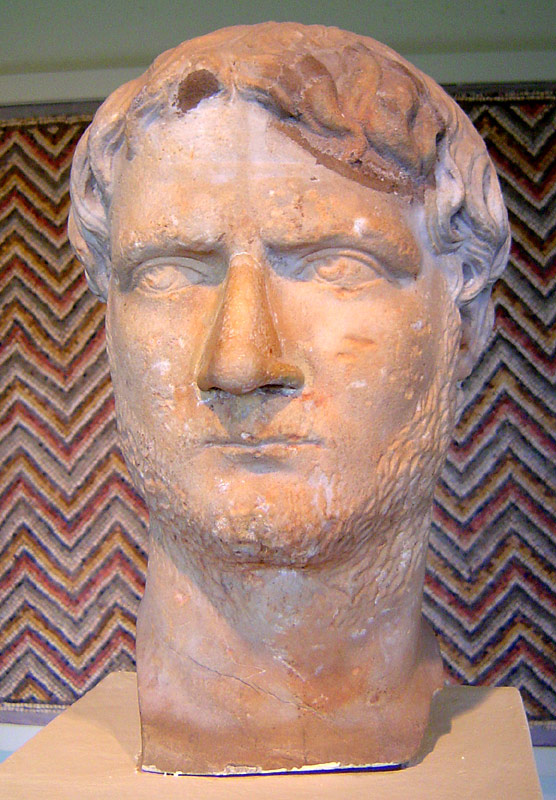
Emperor Gallienus

Year 253 (CCLIII) was a common year starting on Saturday of the Julian calendar. At the time, it was known as the Year of the Consulship of Volusianus and Claudius (or, less frequently, year 1006 Ab urbe condita). The denomination 253 for this year has been used since the early medieval period, when the Anno Domini calendar era became the prevalent method in Europe for naming years.

== Events ==
=== By place ===
==== Roman Empire ====
- The legions who have campaigned against the Goths on the Danube elect Marcus Aemilius Aemilianus as new emperor. He advances on Rome along the Flaminian Way to meet his opponent emperor Trebonianus Gallus and his son Volusianus. For the most part, generals in the border regions are proclaimed emperor by their armies to halt the invasion of Germanic tribes.
- Aemilianus is proclaimed "enemy of the State" by the Roman Senate. Trebonianus Gallus is defeated at Interamna Nahars (Umbria); he flees with Volusianus to the north, but at Foligno they are killed by their own troops.
- Aemilianus rules the Roman Empire for three months; he promises to fight in Thrace and goes to war against Persia. The Senate gives him the rank of Pontifex Maximus.
- Aemilianus is murdered at Spoletium and Publius Valerianus, age 60, is recognised as the new emperor by the Rhine legions. He gives his son Publius Licinius Egnatius Gallienus the title Augustus. Valerianus I dispatches him to the Danube where the Goths have violated the treaty signed with Rome and invaded Moesia.
- Valerianus I splits the Roman Empire in two; Gallienus taking control of the West and his father ruling the East, where he faces the Persian threat.
- Battle of Barbalissos: King Shapur I defeats a Roman field army at Barbalissos in Syria.
- Valerian reforms Legio III Augusta to fight the "five peoples", a dangerous coalition of Berber tribes in Africa.

=== By topic ===
==== Religion ====
- Pope Cornelius is sent into exile.
- June 25 – Pope Lucius I succeeds Pope Cornelius as the 22nd pope.
- Lucius is arrested almost immediately following his election and also exiled.

== Deaths ==
- Aemilianus, Roman emperor
- Pope Cornelius
- Saint Babylas, Patriarch of Antioch
- Fei Yi, Chinese statesman, general and regent of the Shu Han state
- Sun He, Chinese prince of the Eastern Wu state (b. 224)
- Trebonianus Gallus, Roman emperor
- Volusianus, Roman emperor
- Zhuge Ke, Chinese general and regent of the Eastern Wu state (b. 203)
- Origen, a Christian scholar from Alexandria (b. c. 184)
