= Proposition 203 =

Proposition 203 may refer to several propositions numbered 203.

Arizona

- Arizona Proposition 203 (2010)
- English for Children (Arizona Proposition 203, 2000)
