= Flight 203 =

Flight 203 may refer to:

Listed chronologically

- Indian Air Force Flight 203, crashed on 7 February 1968
- Malév Flight 203, crashed on 21 September 1977
- Galaxy Airlines Flight 203, crashed on 21 January 1985
- Avianca Flight 203, destroyed by a bomb on 27 November 1989
- RED Air Flight 203, suffered a landing gear collapse and runway excursion on 21 June 2022
- Mombasa Air Safari Flight 203, crashed on 28 October 2025
