= Cilejit railway station =

Railway station in Bogor Regency, Indonesia

R14 Cilejit station Stasiun Cilejit
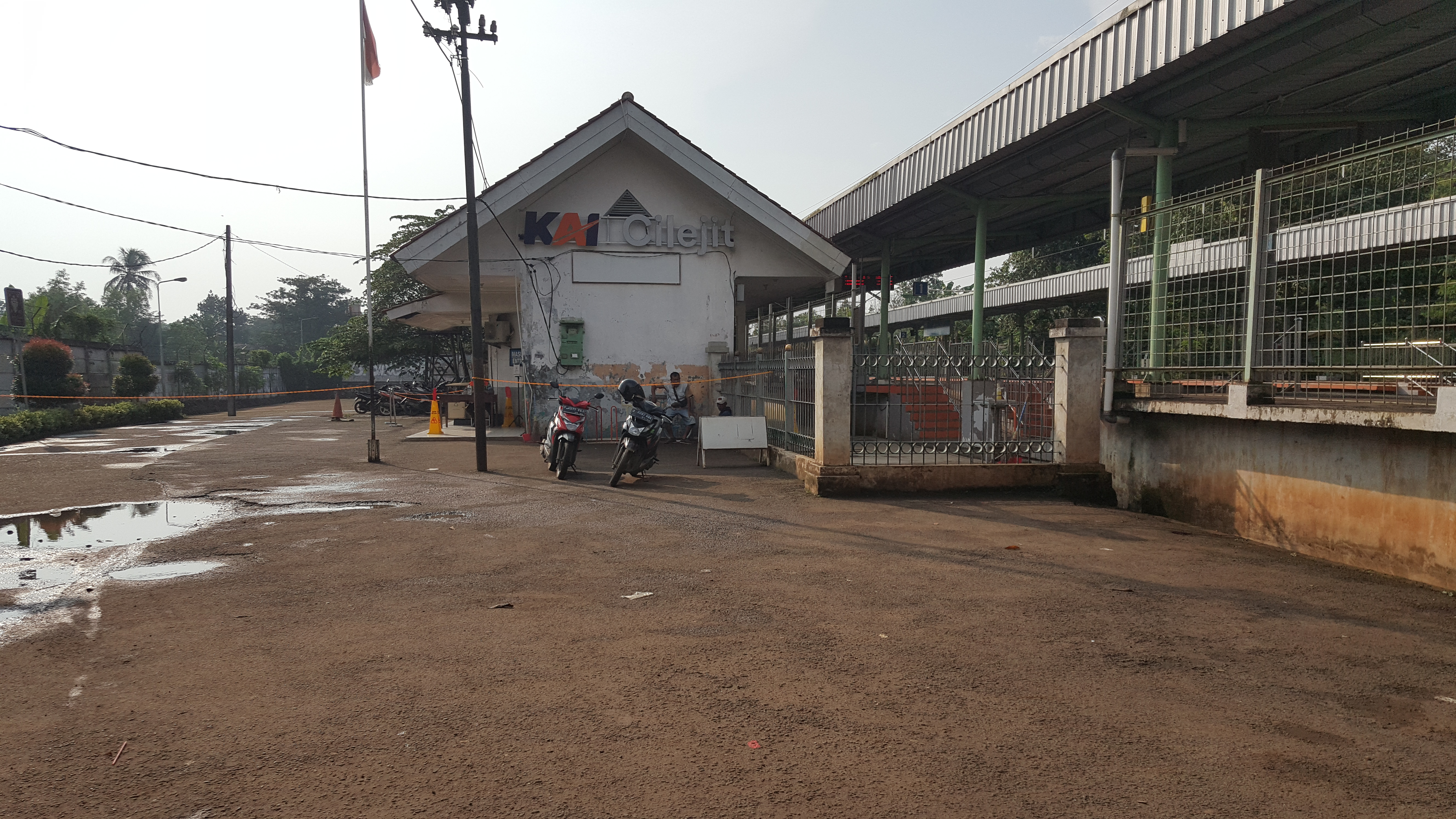
- Cilejit station building in 2022

General information
- Location: Batok, Tenjo, Bogor 16377; West Java; Indonesia
- Coordinates: 6.354368°S 106.509581°E
- Elevation: +53 m
- Owner: Kereta Api Indonesia
- Operator: KAI Commuter
- Lines: Rangkasbitung Line; Merak–Tanah Abang
- Platforms: 2 side platforms
- Tracks: 2

Construction
- Structure type: At-grade
- Parking: Available
- Accessible: Available

Other information
- Station code: CJT • 0206
- Classification: Class III/small

History
- Opened: 1906
- Electrified: 2012

Services
Preceding station		Following station
Parung Panjang towards Tanah Abang	Rangkasbitung Commuter Line	Daru towards Rangkasbitung
Location

Cilejit Station (CJT) is a class III/small train station located on the border between Batok village, Tenjo, Bogor Regency, West Java and Sukamanah village, Jambe, Tangerang Regency, Banten. Although named Cilejit, the station is not located in Gintung Cilejet village, Parung Panjang, but is located to the west of the village. The station, which is located at an altitude of +53 meters, only serves the Commuter Line.

This station is one of the stations on the Merak-Tanah Abang railway line located in Bogor Regency in addition to Parung Panjang station and Tenjo station. The north side of the station is included in the Tangerang Regency area while the south side of the station is included in the Bogor Regency area with railroad tracks as a separator between the two regions.

Only one KRL Commuter Line service stops at this station, which is the Tanah Abang-Serpong-Tigaraksa-Rangkasbitung route.

== Building and layout ==
Initially, the station had one railway line from 1906 - 1990. The original Staatsspoorwegen building is still in use today, in the 1990s the line was increased to 2 lines. Since the double track and the extension of the Commuter Line network have been tested as of May 2012, the layout of this station was changed by adding two high side platforms and changing the existing line 2 into a straight line towards Rangkasbitung. This station, since April 17, 2013, has been serving Commuter Line (KRL AC) to Tanah Abang station.

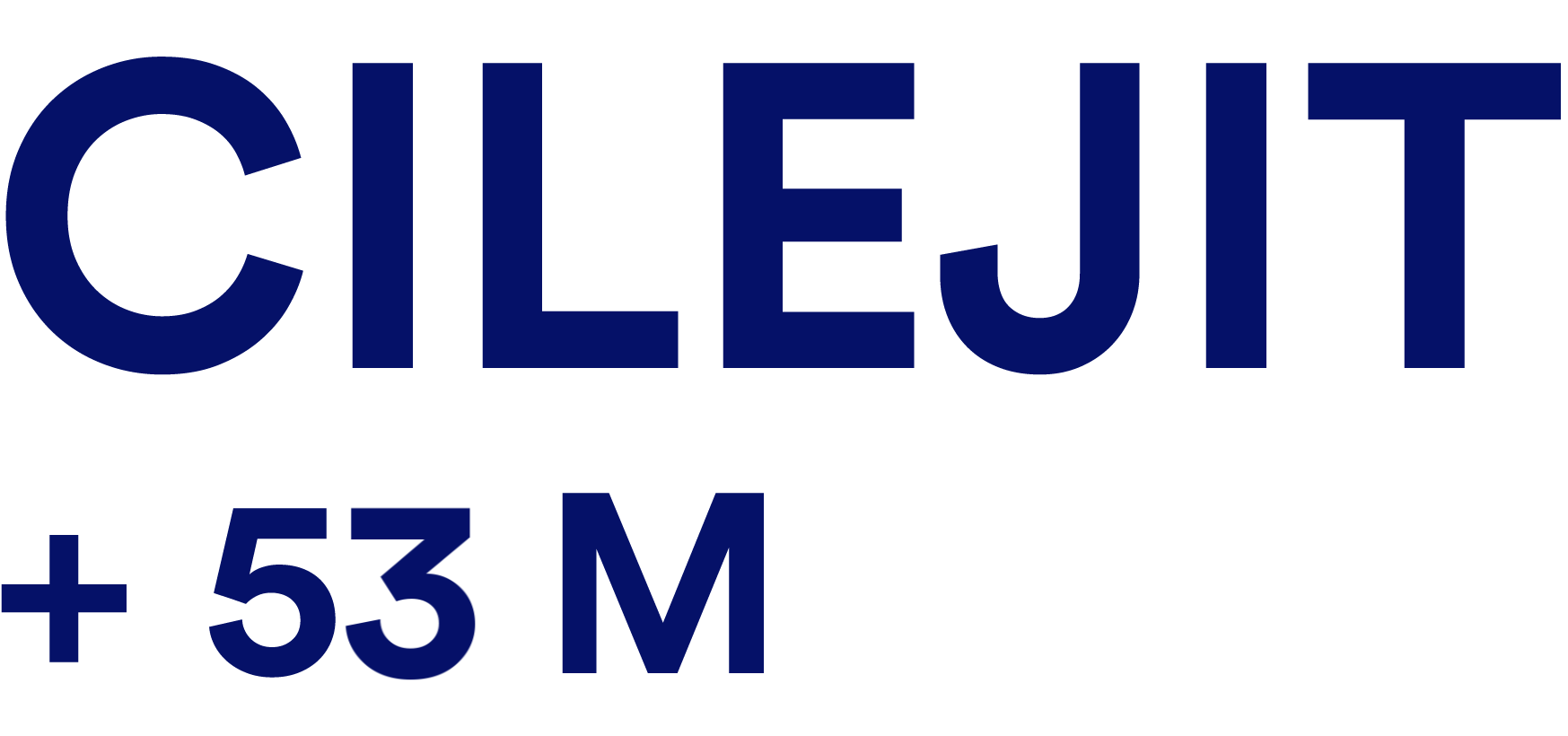
R14
G	Main building	
Platform floor	Side platform, the doors are opened on the right side	
Platform floor	Line 2	← (Daru) Rangkasbitung Line to Tigaraksa/Rangkasbitung
Platform floor	Line 1	Rangkasbitung Line to Tanah Abang (Parung Panjang) →
Platform floor	Side platform, the doors are opened on the right side	
G	Main building	

== Services ==
The following is a list of train services at the Cilejit Station.

- KRL Commuterline
  - Green Line, towards Tanah Abang and Tigaraksa (Tigaraksa branch)
  - Green Line, towards Tanah Abang and Rangkasbitung (Rangkasbitung branch)

== Gallery ==
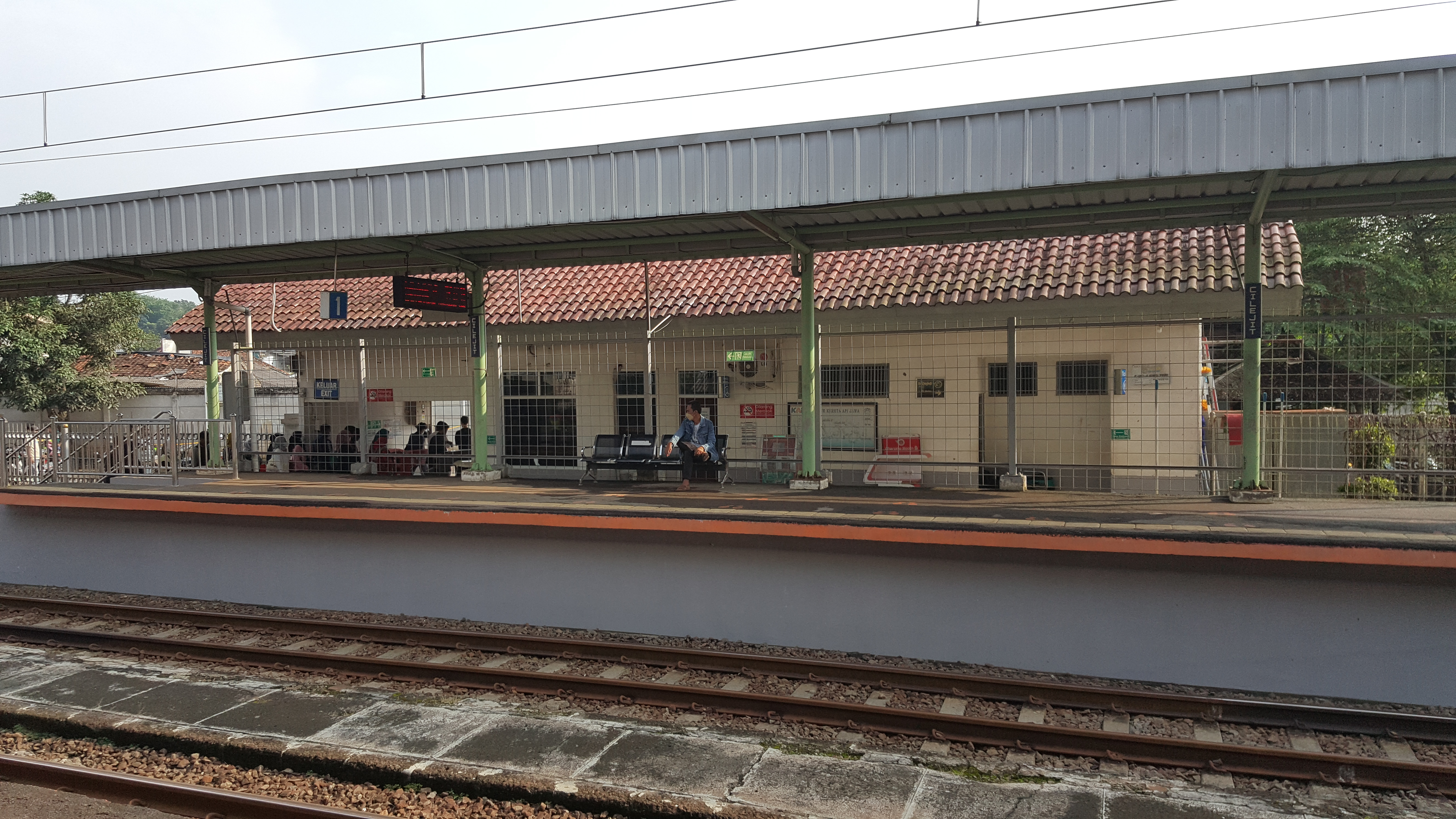
Platform 1 of Cilejit station

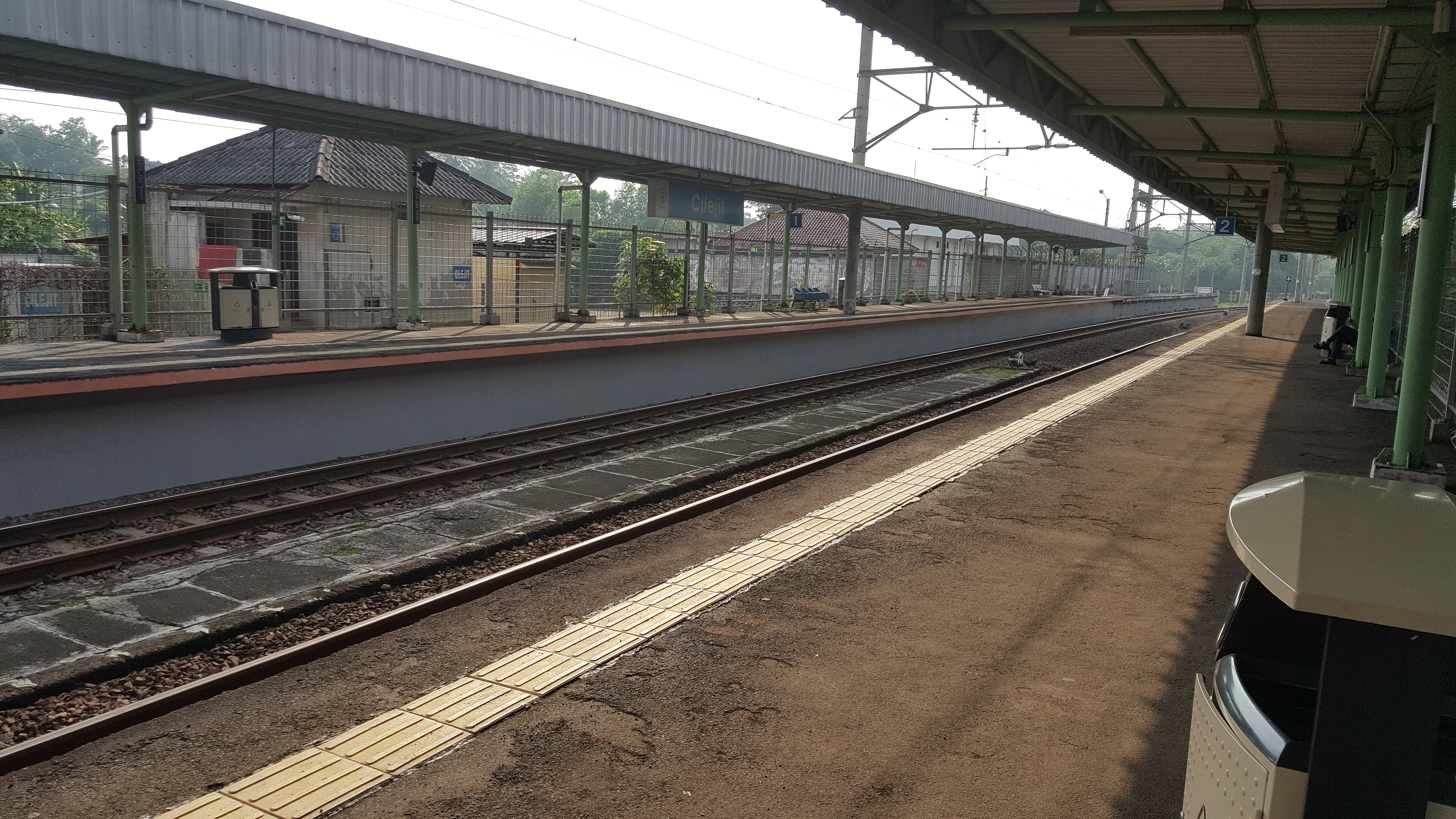
Platform 2 of Cilejit station

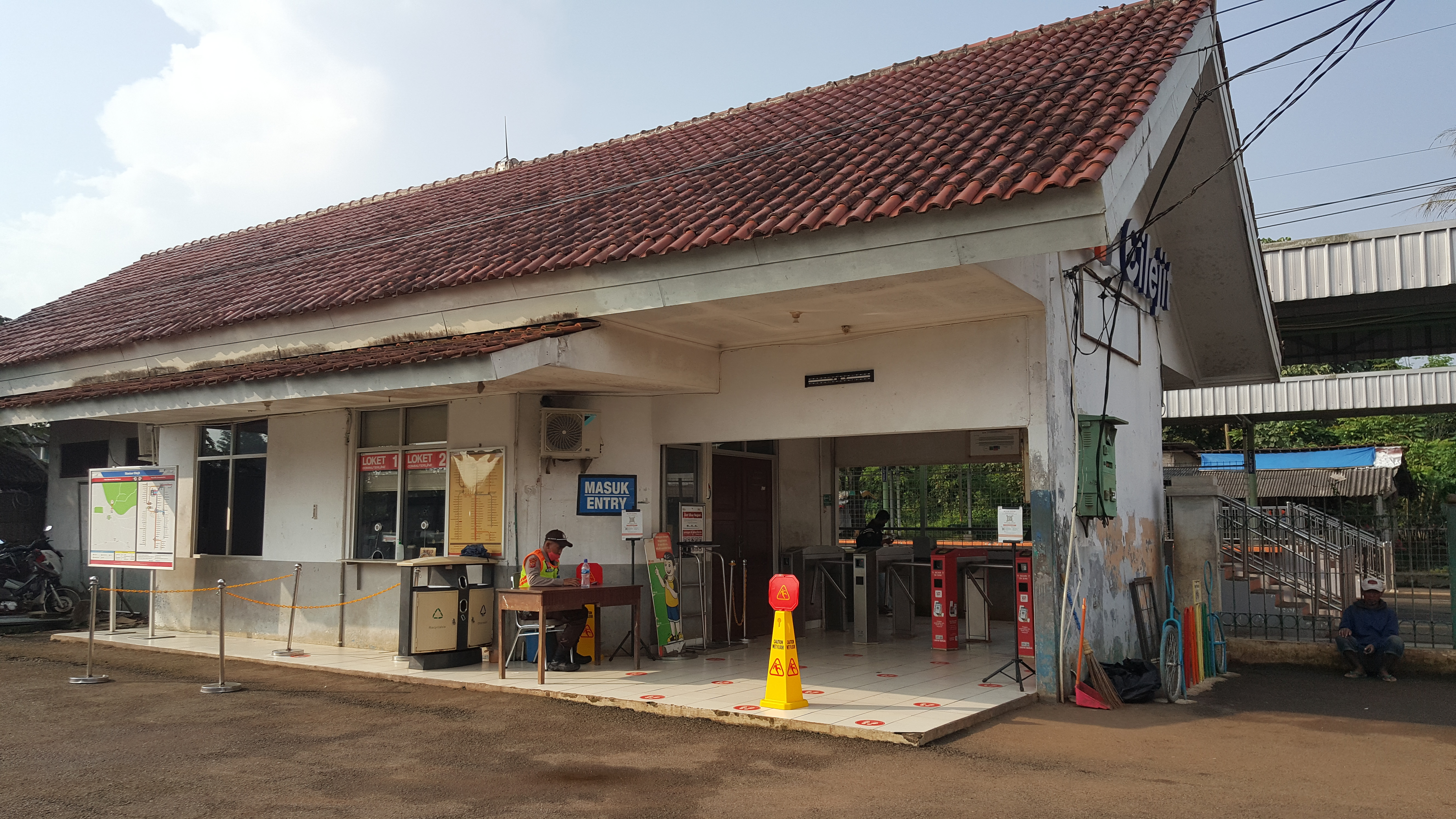
Cilejit station main hall

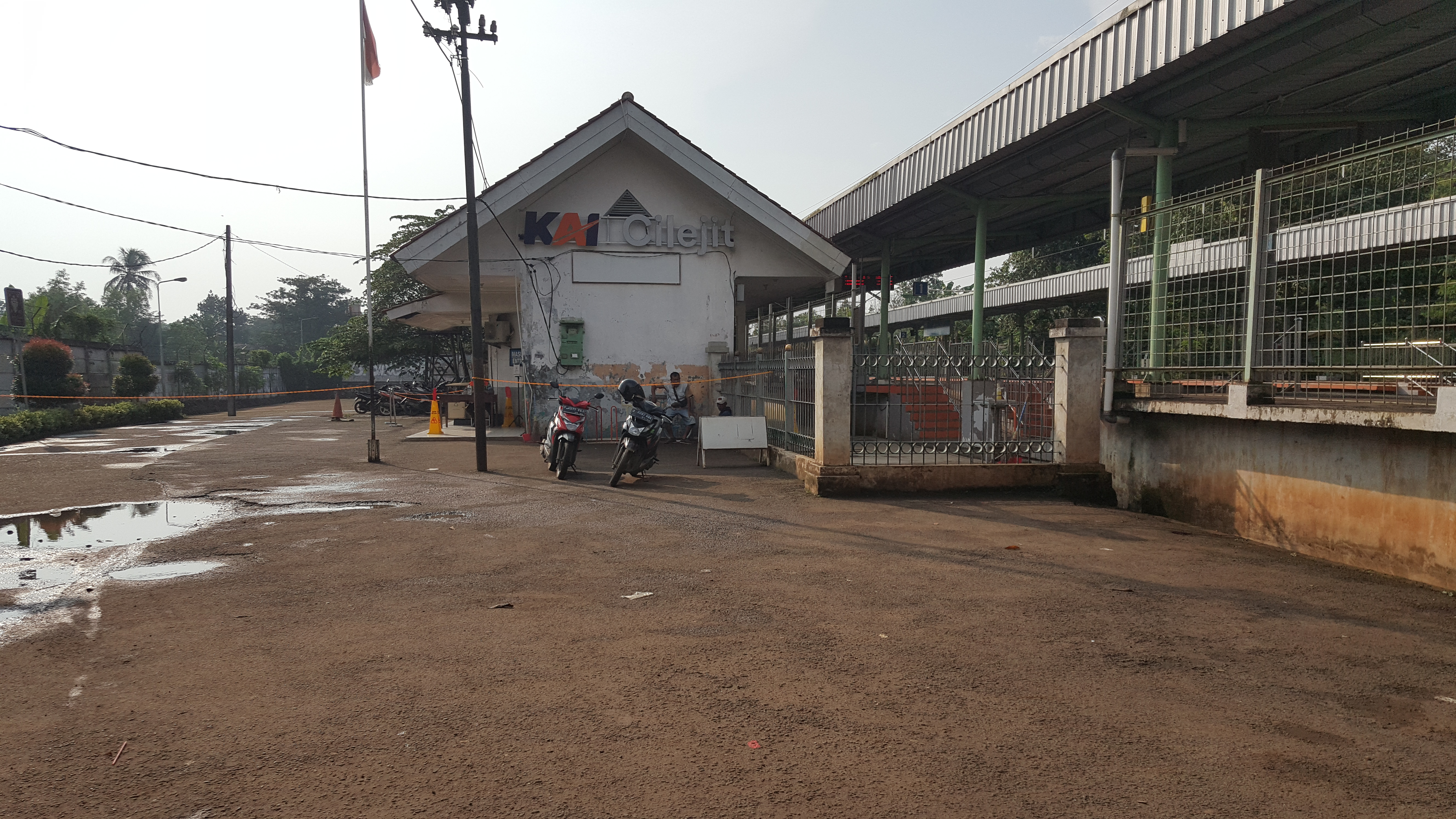
Cilejit station main hall, photo taken from the parking lot

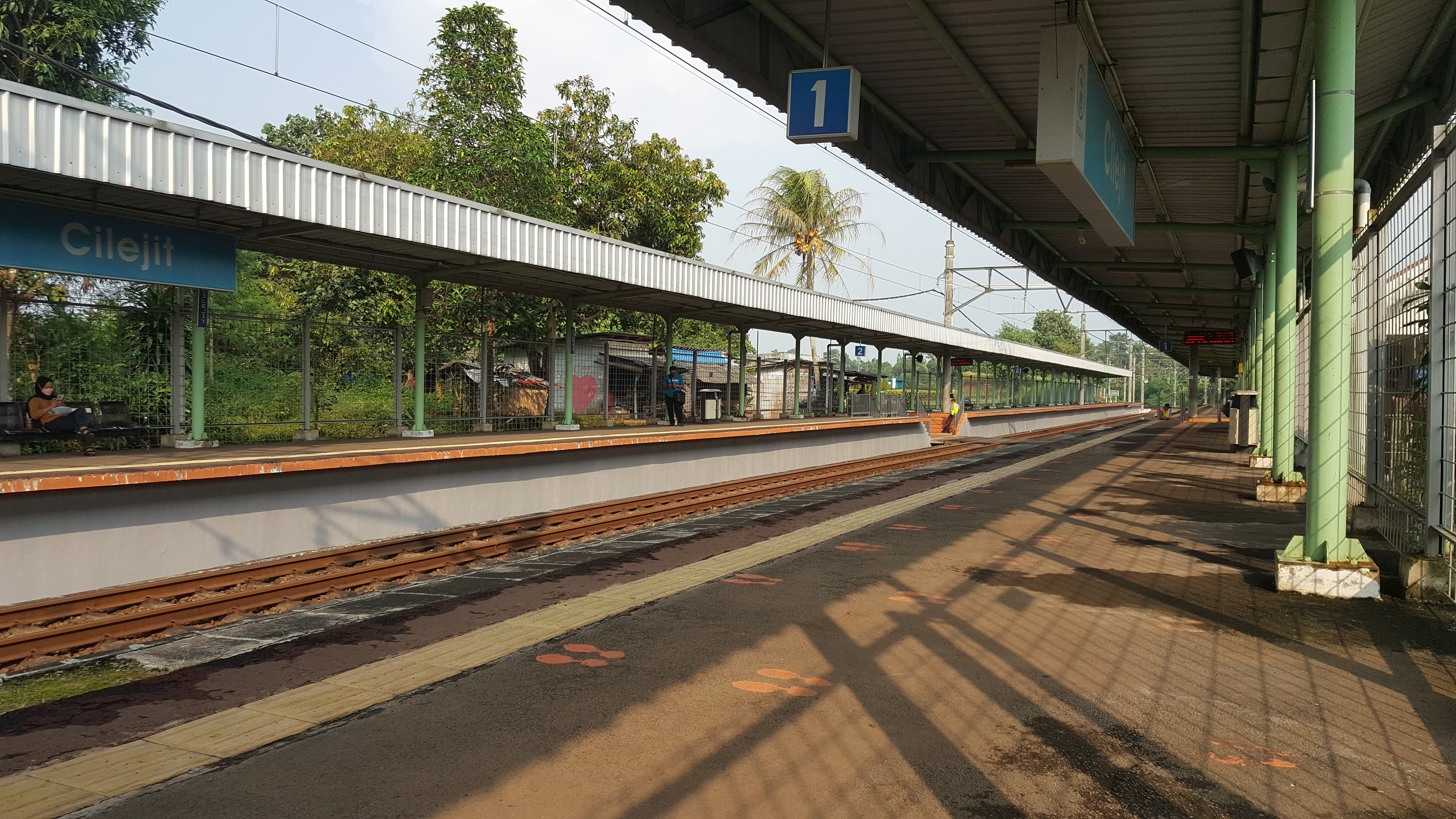
Cilejit station, photo taken from Platform 1

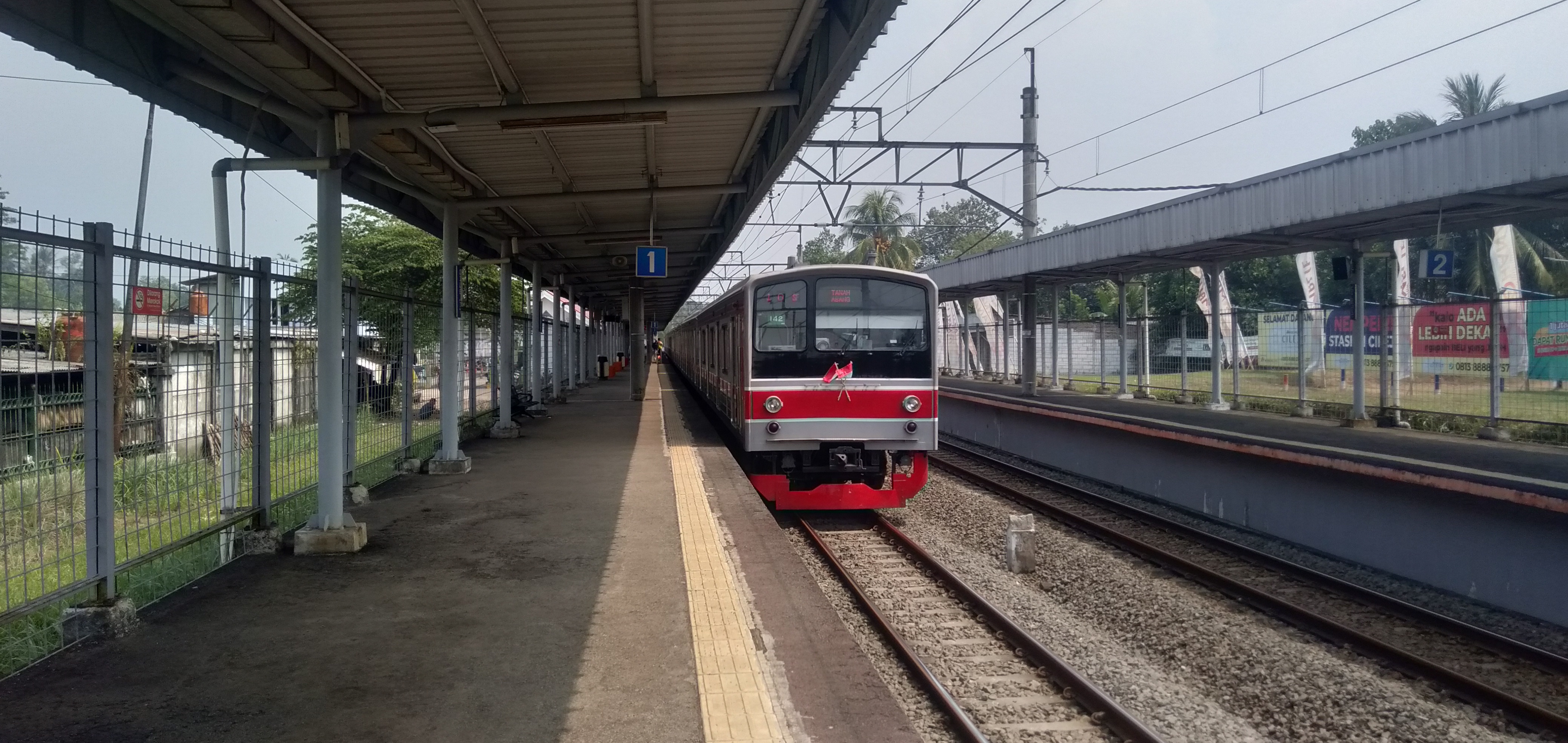
Japan Railways 205 series trainset arrives at Cilejit station
