= 203 =

203 in various calendars
- Gregorian calendar: 203; CCIII
- Ab urbe condita: 956
- Assyrian calendar: 4953
- Balinese saka calendar: 124–125
- Bengali calendar: −391 – −390
- Berber calendar: 1153
- Buddhist calendar: 747
- Burmese calendar: −435
- Byzantine calendar: 5711–5712
- Chinese calendar: 壬午年 (Water Horse); 2900 or 2693 — to — 癸未年 (Water Goat); 2901 or 2694
- Coptic calendar: −81 – −80
- Discordian calendar: 1369
- Ethiopian calendar: 195–196
- Hebrew calendar: 3963–3964
- Hindu calendars
- Vikram Samvat: 259–260
- Shaka Samvat: 124–125
- Kali Yuga: 3303–3304
- Holocene calendar: 10203
- Iranian calendar: 419 BP – 418 BP
- Islamic calendar: 432 BH – 431 BH
- Javanese calendar: 80–81
- Julian calendar: 203; CCIII
- Korean calendar: 2536
- Minguo calendar: 1709 before ROC 民前1709年
- Nanakshahi calendar: −1265
- Seleucid era: 514/515 AG
- Thai solar calendar: 745–746
- Tibetan calendar: ཆུ་ཕོ་རྟ་ལོ་ (male Water-Horse); 329 or −52 or −824 — to — ཆུ་མོ་ལུག་ལོ་ (female Water-Sheep); 330 or −51 or −823

Year 203 (CCIII) was a common year starting on Saturday of the Julian calendar. At the time, it was known as the Year of the Consulship of Plautianus and Geta (or, less frequently, year 956 Ab urbe condita). The denomination 203 for this year has been used since the early medieval period, when the Anno Domini calendar era became the prevalent method in Europe for naming years.

== Events ==
=== By place ===
==== Roman Empire ====
- Emperor Septimius Severus rebuilds Byzantium, and expands the southern frontier of Africa, with the metropolis Carthage re-fortified.
- Gaius Fulvius Plautianus and Publius Septimius Geta become Roman Consuls.
- An arch dedicated to Septimius Severus is erected near the Forum.
- The Portico of Octavia is reconstructed.

==== India ====
- Prince Vijaya becomes king of the Andhra Empire. During his reign, the empire is broken apart into smaller independent principalities.

==== China ====
- Battle of Xiakou: Warlord Sun Quan battles his rival Huang Zu along the Yangtze River near Wuhan.

=== By topic ===
==== Religion ====
- Origen replaces Clement as the head of the Christian school in Alexandria.

== Births ==
- Zhuge Ke, Chinese general and politician (d. 253)

== Deaths ==
- Ŭl P'a-so, Korean official and Prime-Minister
- Ling Cao, Chinese general under Sun Ce
- Perpetua and Felicity, Christian martyrs
- Sun Yi, Chinese general and politician (b. 184)
- Wu Jing, Chinese general under Sun Ce
