= PNR 8000 class =

Class of diesel multiple units operated by the Philippine National Railways

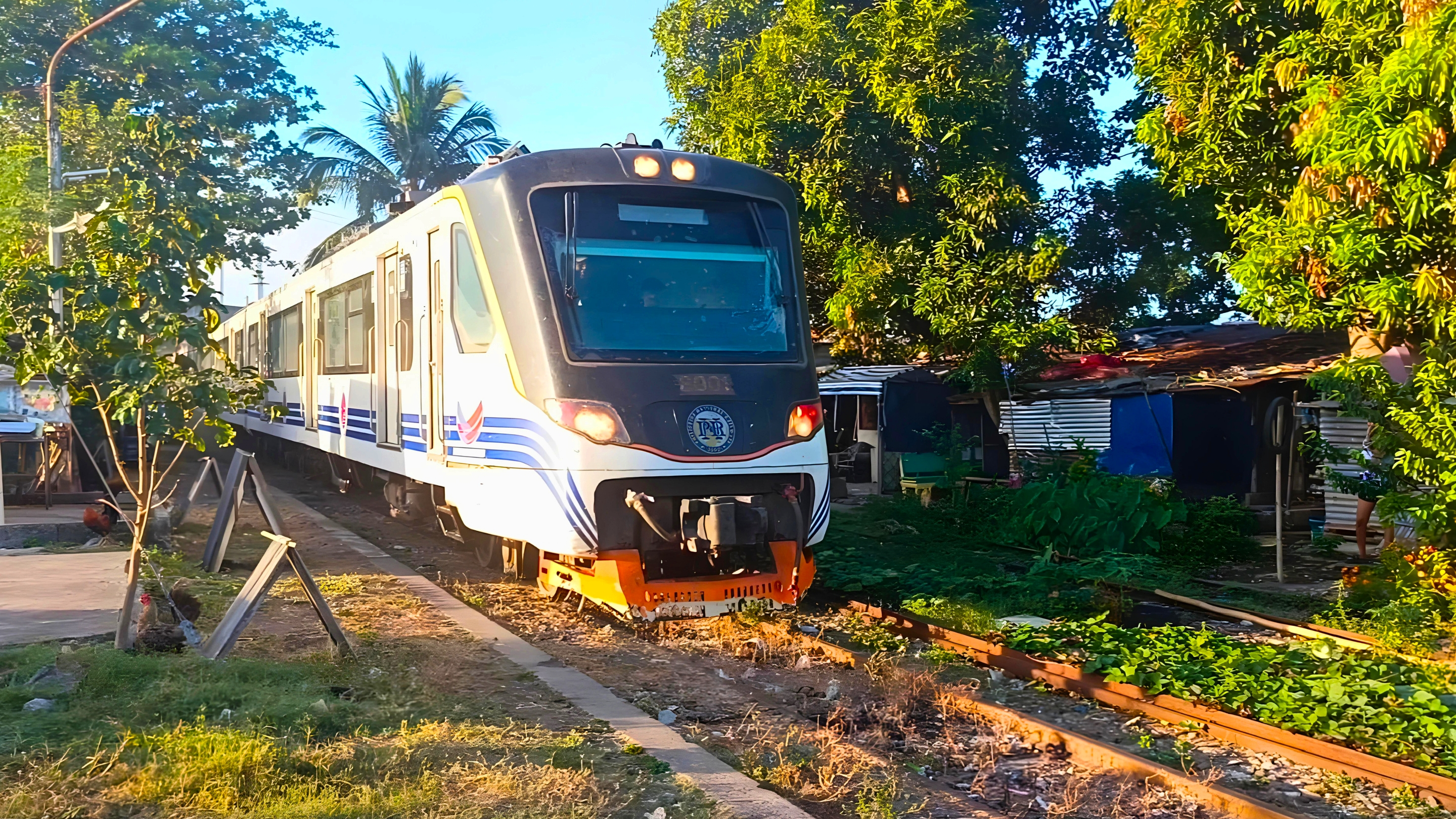
- An 8000 class train arriving at San Pablo station in April 2024

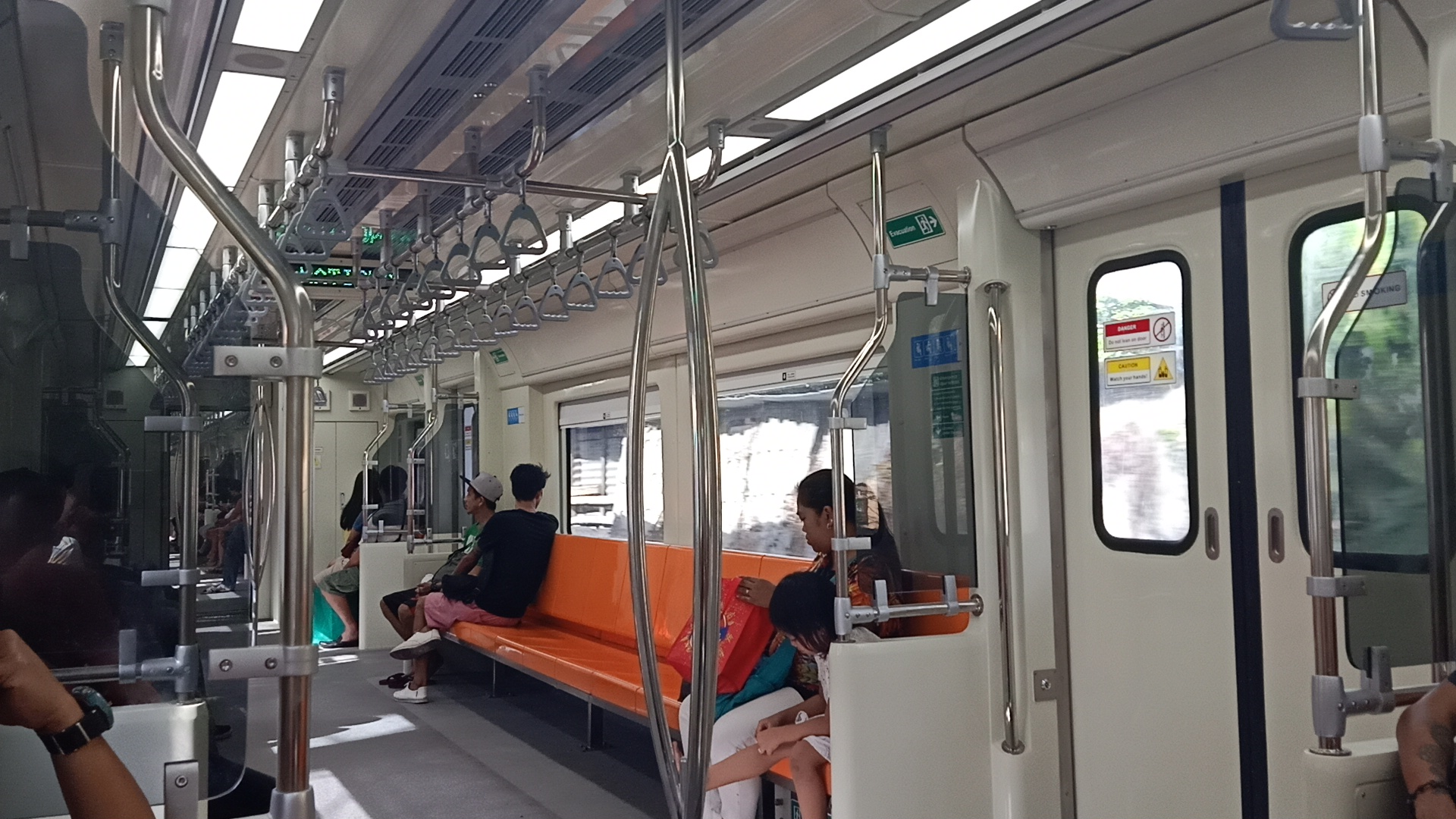
- Train interior in December 2019
- Stock type: Diesel multiple unit
- In service: 2019–present
- Manufacturer: Industri Kereta Api
- Built at: Madiun, Indonesia
- Family name: INKA KRDE ME 204 Set
- Replaced: KiHa 350; KiHa 52 (for Metro North Commuter Services)
- Constructed: 2018–2019
- Entered service: December 16, 2019; 6 years ago
- Number built: 6 vehicles (2 sets)
- Number in service: 6 vehicles (2 sets)
- Formation: 3 cars per trainset MeC–TC–MeC
- Fleet numbers: 8001–8002
- Capacity: 750 passengers
- Operator: Philippine National Railways
- Depots: Calamba, Naga
- Lines served: Metro Commuter Line (2019–2024); Inter-Provincial Commuter (2022–); Bicol Commuter (2023–)

Specifications
- Car body construction: Stainless steel
- Train length: 62.1 m (203 ft 8 7/8 in)
- Car length: 20.7 m (67 ft 10 61/64 in)
- Width: 2.99 m (9 ft 9 23/32 in)
- Height: 3.83 m (12 ft 6 25/32 in)
- Doors: Double-leaf pocket-type; 3 per side
- Wheelbase: 2.2 m (87 in)
- Maximum speed: 100 km/h (62 mph)
- Weight: 79 t (174,000 lb): 42 t (93,000 lb) (MeC); 37 t (82,000 lb) (T)
- Prime mover: Cummins QSN14
- Engine type: 4-stroke radiator-cooled engine
- Power output: 193–391 kW (259–524 hp)
- Transmission: Diesel–hydraulic
- HVAC: ICOND roof-mounted air conditioning
- Bogies: MB-207 bolsterless (motor); TB-607 (trailer)
- Braking system: Knorr-Bremse electro-pneumatic
- Coupling system: AAR/knuckle
- Seating: Longitudinal
- Track gauge: 1,067 mm (3 ft 6 in)

The PNR 8000 class (also known as the INKA DMUs together with PNR 8100 class) is a diesel multiple unit (DMU) train operated by the Philippine National Railways (PNR) since 2019.

== Operational history ==
=== Purchase ===
PNR signed a contract worth ₱485,312,600.00 (US$9.7 million) with the Indonesian firm Industri Kereta Api (PT INKA) on January 22, 2018, for the purchase of two sets of 3-car DMUs as part of the Reliability and Availability Program. The project was funded from the budget of the then-Department of Transportation and Communications (DOTC) as allocated in the 2015 General Appropriations Act.

=== Delivery and commissioning ===
PNR took delivery of the 8000 class trains on December 11, 2019. These were inaugurated at Dela Rosa station on December 16, entering revenue service on the same day. From that date until January 14, 2020, PNR offered free rides on these trainsets between Tutuban and FTI and vice versa, but with 20-passenger limit per station only.

Initially, the trainsets were planned to reach Alabang station, but was delayed due to track obstructions and security problems. A trial run to the Alabang station performed by an 8000 class train was conducted on March 1, 2020, followed by passenger trial runs later that month.

From December 2019 to March 2020, the trains serviced the Metro South Commuter line from Tutuban to FTI stations and vice versa, and since June 1, 2020, the trains now serve operations for the Metro North Commuter (MNC) line from Governor Pascual to Bicutan stations and vice versa. While running from Governor Pascual to Bicutan, the LED screen displays the train going to FTI instead of Bicutan. Occasionally, the trains service the Metro South Commuter line when the Hyundai Rotem DMUs occupy the MNC services.

As of April 2024, 8001 is serving the Calamba–Lucena Inter-Provincial Commuter service, while 8002 is serving the Bicol Commuter Line.

On October 22, 2024, rains brought by Tropical Storm Trami (local name Kristine), registered were recorded as high as 578.9 mm in just one day, causing the PNR Naga railway depot to be flooded, affecting one of PNR 8000 class unit, 8002, along with a 9000 class unit, a KiHa 52 rescue train, KiHa 35 and KiHa 59 series Kogane, PNR 2500 class and a PNR 5000 class. Eventually 8002 was repaired and served the Naga–Sipocot route.

=== Status ===
As of September 2026, these trainsets are still actively running in the South lines after the closure of the Metro Commuter line in 2024.

Fleet	Status	Configuration	Notes
8001	Active	MeC1 + TC-1 + MeC2	Originally ran in Metro Commuter line, before transferring to Inter-Provincial Commuter line.
8002	Active	MeC3 + TC-2 + MeC4	Originally ran in Metro Commuter line, before transferring to Inter-Provincial Commuter line, and then transferring to the Naga-Lupi Viejo line.

== Design and features ==
The trains were manufactured by the Indonesian firm Industri Kereta Api, also known as INKA. The 8000 and 8100 DMUs and the 8300 class coaches are all given the designation K3 during their test runs in Indonesia.

=== Car body ===
The design of the 8000 class was based from PT Kereta Api's existing EA203 series electric multiple units (EMUs), Minangkabau Express, Adi Soemarmo International Airport Railink, Yogyakarta International Airport Railink & Solo Express diesel electric multiple units (DEMU), but the number of doors were increased from two to three double-leaf sliding doors per side.

The livery consists of a white body with a black design in the windows and blue stripes underneath it. The driver cabs, on the other hand, have a black and orange design with the PNR logo underneath the windshield.

=== Interior ===
The trains are the first in the entire PNR system to feature an LED passenger information system display in each train car. Seats are colored orange and longitudinal-type.

The design capacity of a three-car trainset is 750 passengers.

== Incidents and accidents ==
After the inauguration of the 8000 class, multiple stoning incidents were recorded in December 2019. The old trains were involved at the incidents such as the PNR Hyundai Rotem DMU, 203 series, and the KiHa 35. The 8000 class were also involved at the stoning incident. The cause of the incidents were from a group of minors that throw stones and sometimes used a slingshot.

- 14 stoning incidents were reported from December 2 to 21, 2019, including a stoning incident in one 8000 class train.
- On December 28, 2019, an 8000 class was obstructed between España and Sta. Mesa stations.
- 8001 hit a car at the railroad crossing in Brgy. Masaya, Bay, Laguna on July 30, 2023.

== Gallery ==
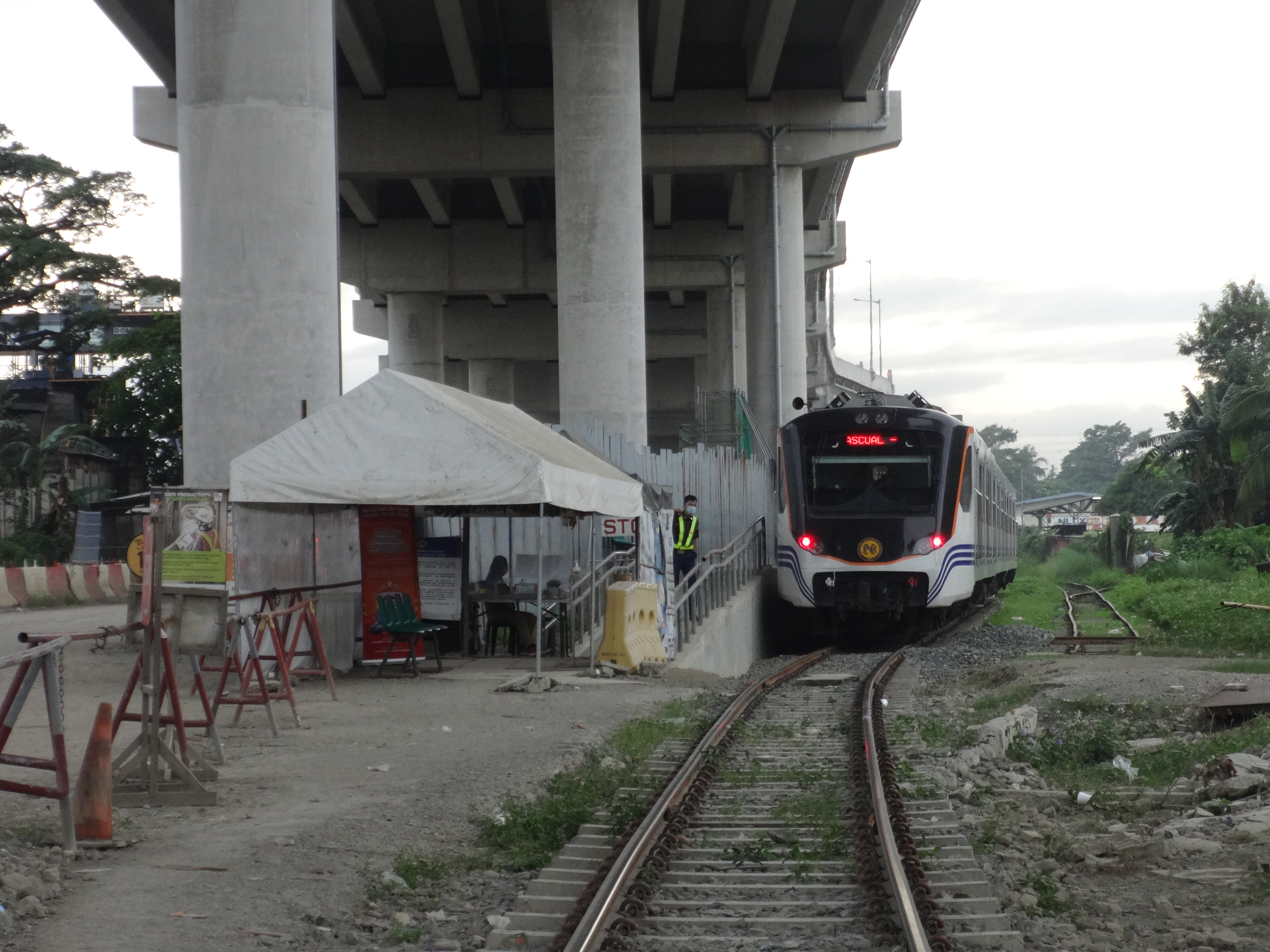
An 8000 class with its cowcatcher removed at Sangandaan station

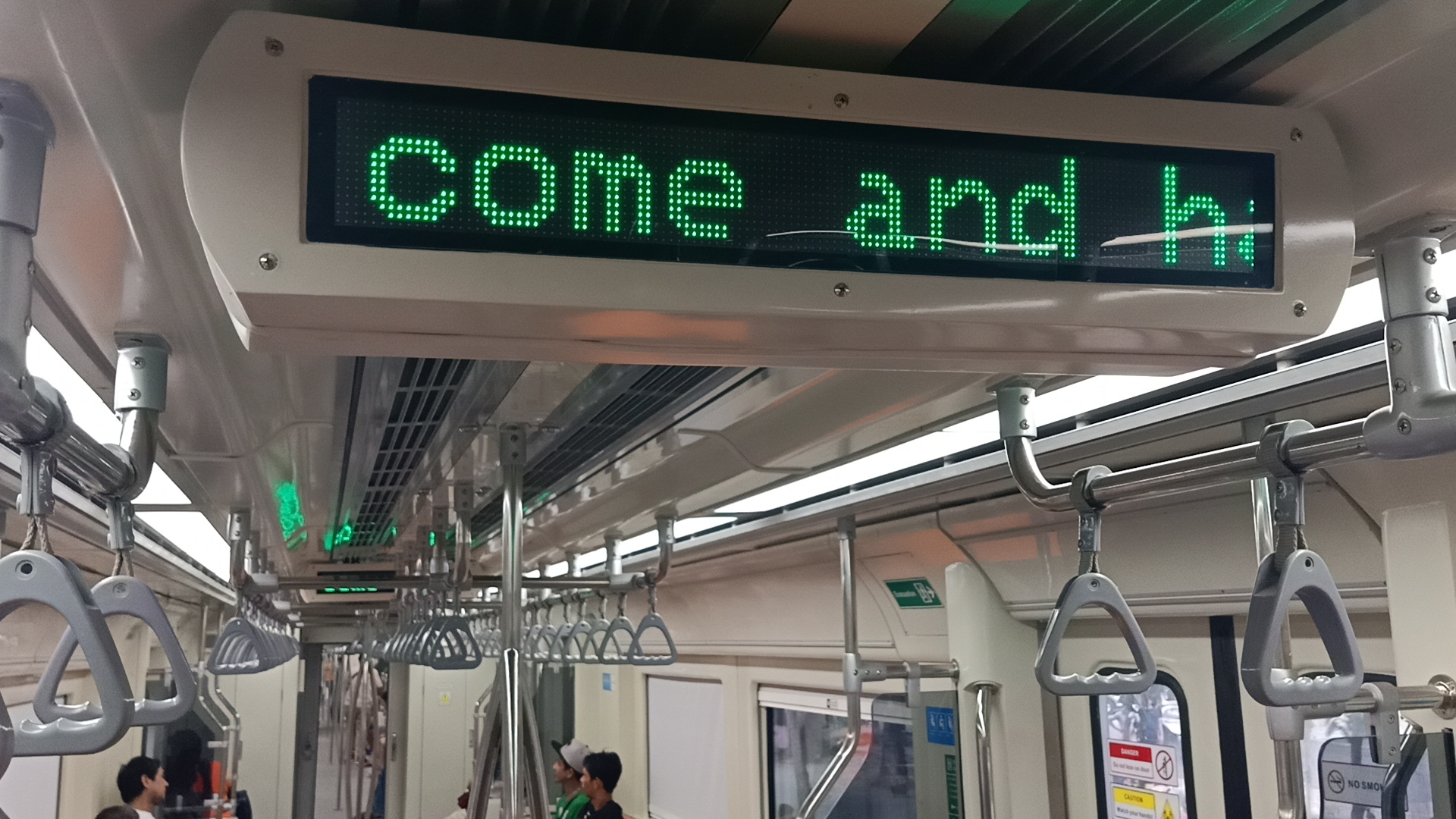
The LED screens of the 8000 class

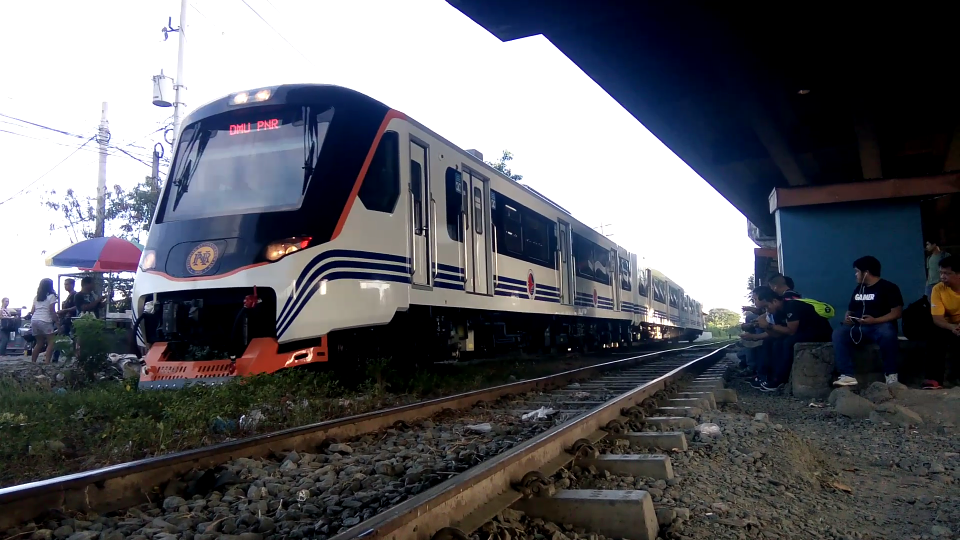
An 8000 class train at FTI station in December 2019

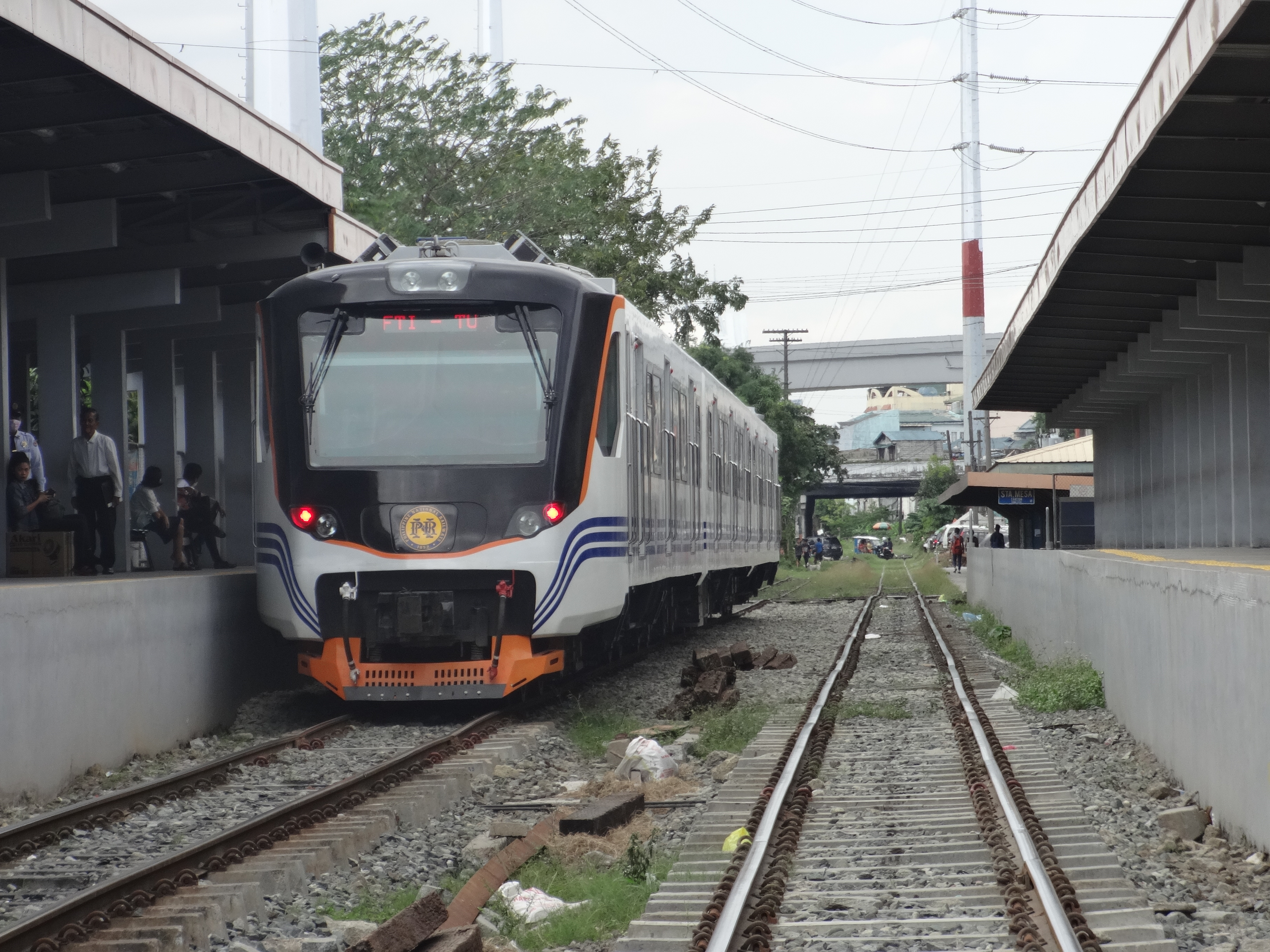
An 8000 class train at Santa Mesa station in February 2020

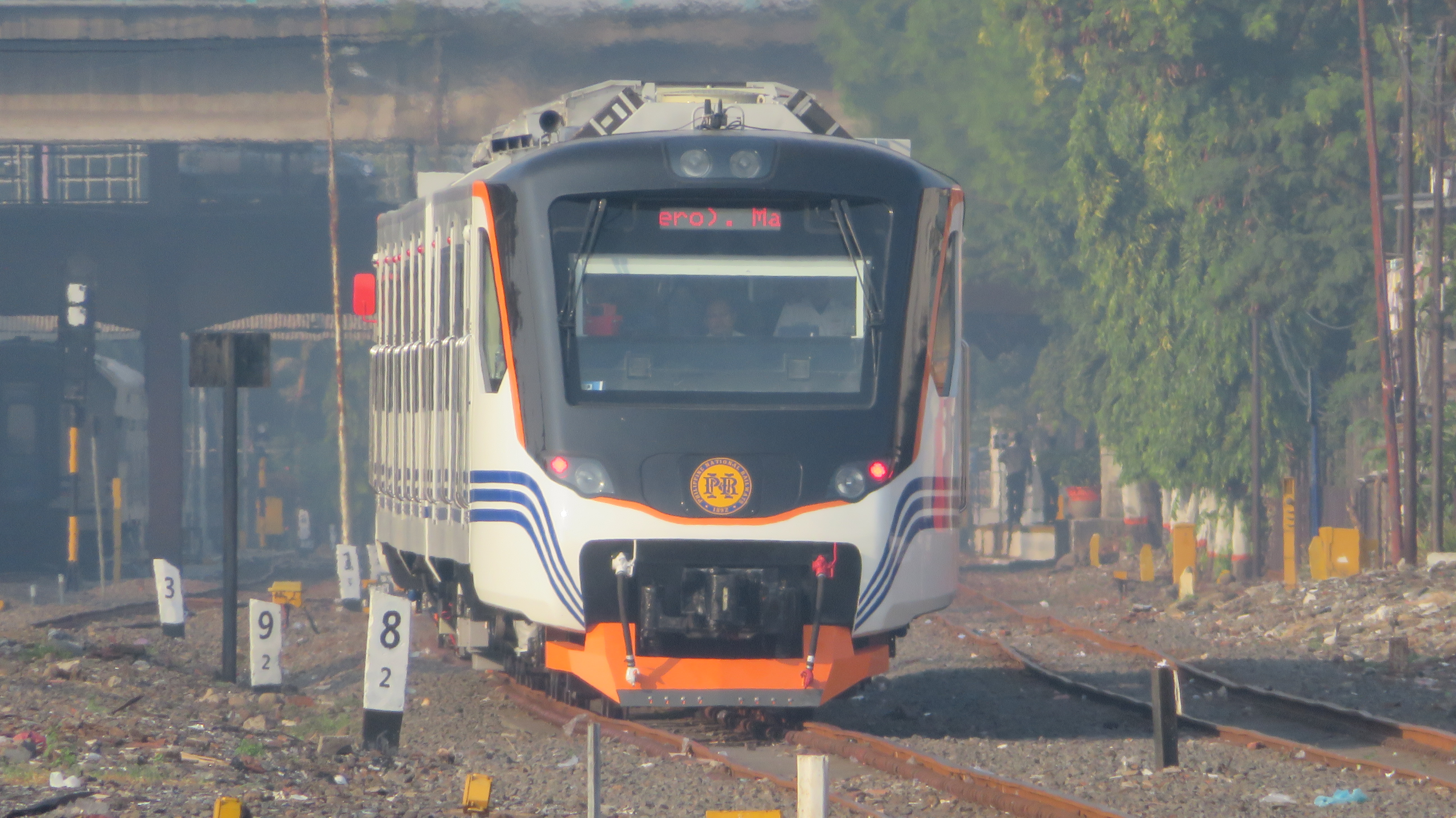
An 8000 class train during its test run in Indonesia in July 2019

== See also ==
- PNR 8100 class
- PNR 8300 class
- INKA CC300
