= List of rail accidents in the Philippines =

This is a list of rail accidents and incidents that happened in different railway lines in the Philippines.

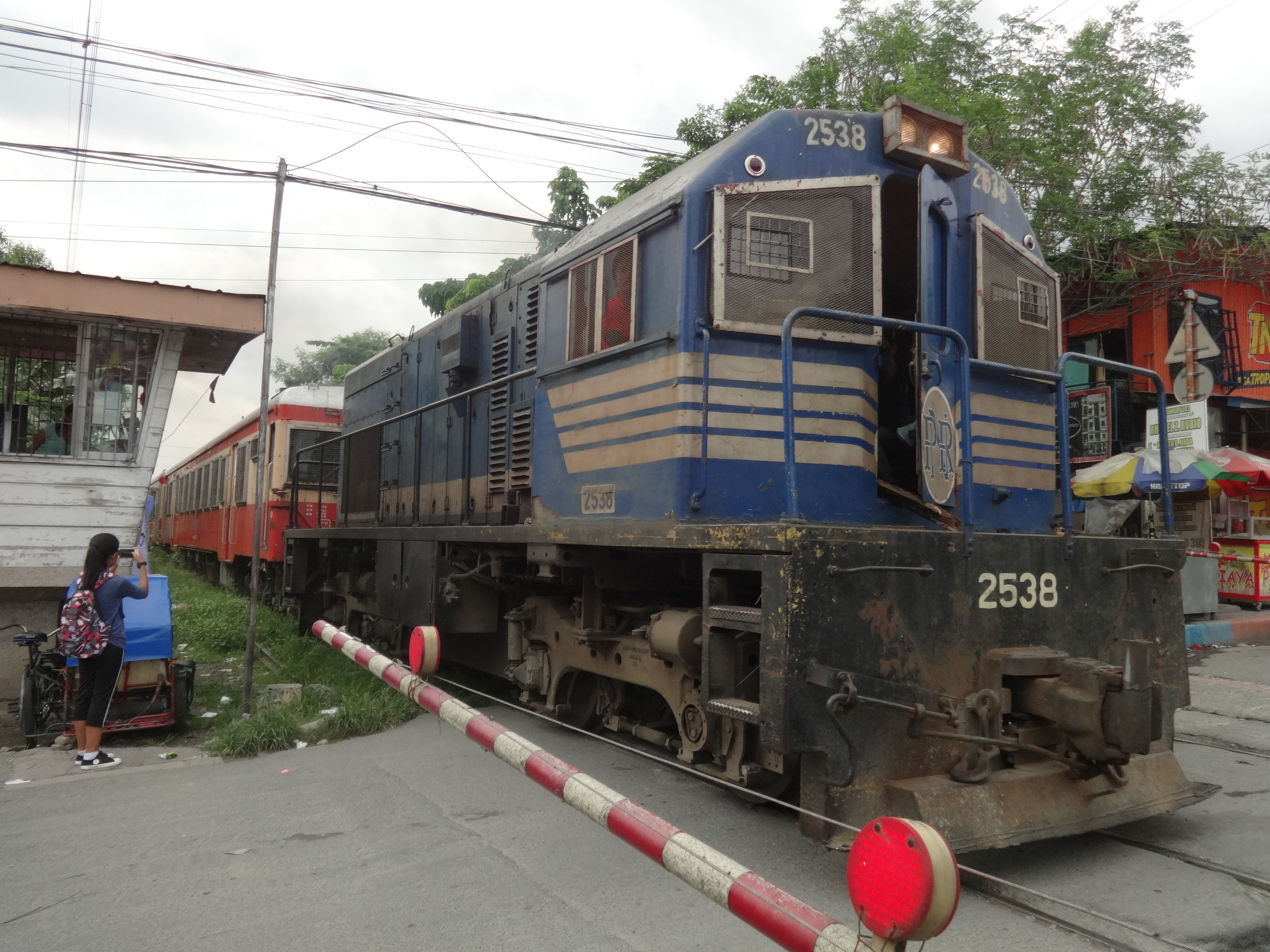
A Philippine National Railways 2500-class diesel electric locomotive hauling KiHa 52 coaches in Santa Mesa, Manila.

== 1954 ==
- 2 September: 82 people were killed when an overloaded train carrying timber broke apart, derailed and crashed into a bridge and fell into a 30.4 metres (100 ft) ravine as it approached a steep portion of track in Barangay Fabrica, Sagay City, Negros Occidental. Most of the victims were employees of the Insular Lumber Company and their families.

== 1974 ==
- 10 August: Philippine National Railways (PNR) train No. 73 travelling from San Fernando, La Union to Manila collided with a Baliwag Transit bus at a railroad crossing in Barangay Balungao, Calumpit, Bulacan around 1:30 p.m., killing 18 people and injuring 53 others.

== 1980 ==
- 25 January: PNR train No. T-71 travelling from San Fernando, La Union to Manila collided with a Mercedes-Benz sedan at a railroad crossing in Barangay Rizal, Moncada, Tarlac, killing two persons and injuring another in the car.

== 1997 ==
- 22 September: Seven people died and 220 were injured when a PNR commuter train collided with another commuter train between Sucat station and Alabang station in Muntinlupa. According to the PNR, a coupler on the first train apparently failed, sending its three-passenger coaches rolling backward about one mile before it hit the other train. One coach derailed in the collision with the five-coach second train. The impact lifted one of the coaches off the tracks, causing it to tilt and scrape two shanties built close to the railway. The shanties were damaged but no one was hurt inside.

== 2000 ==
- 30 December 2000: On Rizal Day, an LRT-1 train (Car number 1037) exploded near Blumentritt station as part of the Rizal Day bombings. The attack on the line killed some 22 people and injured hundreds. Eight members of both the Jemaah Islamiyah and the Moro Islamic Liberation Front (MILF), which included Asia's then-most wanted man, Riduan Isamuddin, also known as Hambali, and Indonesian bomber Fathur Rahman al-Ghozi, were charged with plotting and masterminding the attacks in 2003. Three suspects were put on trial, with al-Ghozi receiving 17 years in prison due to the illegal possession of explosives. Al-Ghozi later died in a firefight after attempting to escape from prison. Car number 1037 has since been decommissioned, but there are plans to reconstruct it.

== 2004 ==
- 12 November: 10 people were killed and 160 people were injured after a PNR train from Legazpi City, Albay carrying around 400 passengers bound for Tutuban in Manila derailed and fell off a 40-foot ravine while traversing a curve at Barangay Duhat in Padre Burgos, Quezon.

== 2012 ==
- 26 October: Five people suffered minor injuries after PNR train No. 611 carrying 128 passengers from Tutuban bound for Bicol derailed in Barangay Canda in Sariaya, Quezon after it passed through a portion of the tracks that collapsed due to flooding and heavy rain.
- 3 November: An MRT-3 train from Araneta Center-Cubao Station caught fire as it approached GMA-Kamuning Station, causing passengers to scramble to the exits, and injuring two women. The train caught fire due to electrical short-circuit technical failure.

== 2014 ==
- 26 March: At 10:50 a.m., a southbound MRT-3 train at Guadalupe Station suddenly stopped due to the train driver not observing the red light status and accelerated southbound without getting prior clearance from the Control Center, causing the automatic train stop system to trigger, resulting in eight injuries.
- 19 May: A cigarette vendor died while six others were hurt when a PNR train from Tutuban Station collided with a jeepney across the railroad tracks along G. Tuazon Street in Sampaloc, Manila at around 4:30 p.m. The jeepney was dragged around 50 metres (160 ft) from the site of the collision. The driver of the jeepney was allegedly drunk when the collision happened.
- 13 August: A southbound MRT-3 train heading to Taft Avenue station derailed and overshot to the streets. The train first stopped after leaving Magallanes station due to a technical problem. Later on, the train broke down altogether, so another train was used to push the stalled train. During this process, however, the first train got detached from the rails and overshot towards Taft Avenue, breaking the concrete barriers and falling to the street below. At least 38 people were injured. The accident was blamed on two train drivers and two control personnel for failing to follow the proper coordination procedures and protocol.

== 2015 ==
- 29 April: Eighty passengers sustained minor injuries after a PNR commuter train carrying around 500 passengers from Tutuban to Alabang derailed in Taguig.

== 2016 ==
- 12 January: A PNR Metro South Commuter Line train from Alabang collided with a jeepney at the Pedro Gil Street crossing near Paco station in Paco, Manila. One person died from head injuries and six were injured.

== 2017 ==
- 7 July: Five people, including a pregnant woman, were hurt when an ambulance was hit by a PNR train near Blumentritt Station in Manila. The ambulance, which came from Barangay 167 (Llano) in Caloocan, was on its way to a hospital to bring the pregnant woman when the accident occurred.

== 2019 ==
- 18 May: An unpowered LRT-2 train parked on a pocket track started moving on its own and ended up on the eastbound track of the main line, and collided with an oncoming loaded train. The operator of the loaded train was already notified to stop prior to the collision. The operator of the unpowered train jumped onto the tracks. The collision injured 30 passengers and 4 staff.
- 3 September: At least five people were hurt while four houses were damaged after a PNR train rammed a Nissan Urvan that crossed the railroad tracks around 4:50 a.m. in a slum in Barangay Parian, Calamba, Laguna.
- 3 October: A power trip caused rectifier substations located between Anonas and Katipunan stations of the LRT-2 and in the LRT-2 Santolan depot to catch fire at around 11 AM, cutting the line's power supply in the area. Line operations from Recto to Santolan were suspended at 11:24 a.m., and passengers were evacuated from the line with no injuries. The Light Rail Transit Authority (LRTA), Metropolitan Manila Development Authority (MMDA) and the Philippine Coast Guard immediately deployed shuttle buses to help ferry stranded passengers. Partial operations between Cubao and Recto stations resumed on 8 October while Santolan, Katipunan and Anonas Stations reopened after nine months. The initial estimated amount of damages was at around ₱428 million. Due to the incident, the LRTA claimed full operations would be back in two to three months. As the initial deadline was not met the three stations that were caught in a power trip were expected to resume services at the end of June 2020. However, this deadline was also not met, and full operations resumed on 22 January 2021.
- 1 December: A 21-year-old woman died and a male driver was hurt after their car was hit by a PNR train at Halang Crossing in Barangay Canlalay, Biñan, Laguna. Based on footage from security cameras, the car apparently tried to beat the south-bound train in crossing the tracks.
- 19 December: A public school teacher and a 12-year-old boy died after a PNR Bicol train hit a passenger van in Libmanan, Camarines Sur at around 11:50 a.m. Fifteen other passengers of the van were injured, with the victims' ages ranging from eight to 54 years old.

== 2021 ==
- 22 August: Three teenagers died after being run over by a PNR train in Santa Mesa, Manila.
- 9 October: An MRT Line 3 train caught fire near Guadalupe station. A provisional service was implemented between North Avenue and Shaw Boulevard station, and the site of the incident was declared fire out at 9:51 p.m. 8 passengers sustained minor injuries. Normal operations resumed the following day.
- 21 November: At 6:51 a.m., a window in a 3000 class LRV was damaged due to a stoning incident, with one injury reported. The suspect was later identified as a garbage collector and was subsequently arrested and charged.

== 2022 ==
- 12 April : A child died after being run over by a 900 class locomotive hauling a 203 series EMU train at the intersection of Antipolo Street and Ipil Street in Sta. Cruz, Manila.
- 25 September: A DMU train collided with a crane while performing a MNC service in Sta. Mesa, Manila, causing three injuries and damages to the front cab of the train.

== 2023 ==
- 7 November : A 29-year-old man in Polangui, Albay, died after being struck by a PNR 9000 class after suffering from an epileptic seizure
- 13 November : A 30-year-old man in Oas, Albay, died after being run over by a PNR 9000 class after allegedly sleeping on the steel tracks due to intoxication.
- 28 November : A man in Naga City was run over by a PNR 9000 class at around 6:43 p.m. near the Almeda Highway
