= PNR 900 class =

Diesel-electric locomotives used by Philippine National Railways

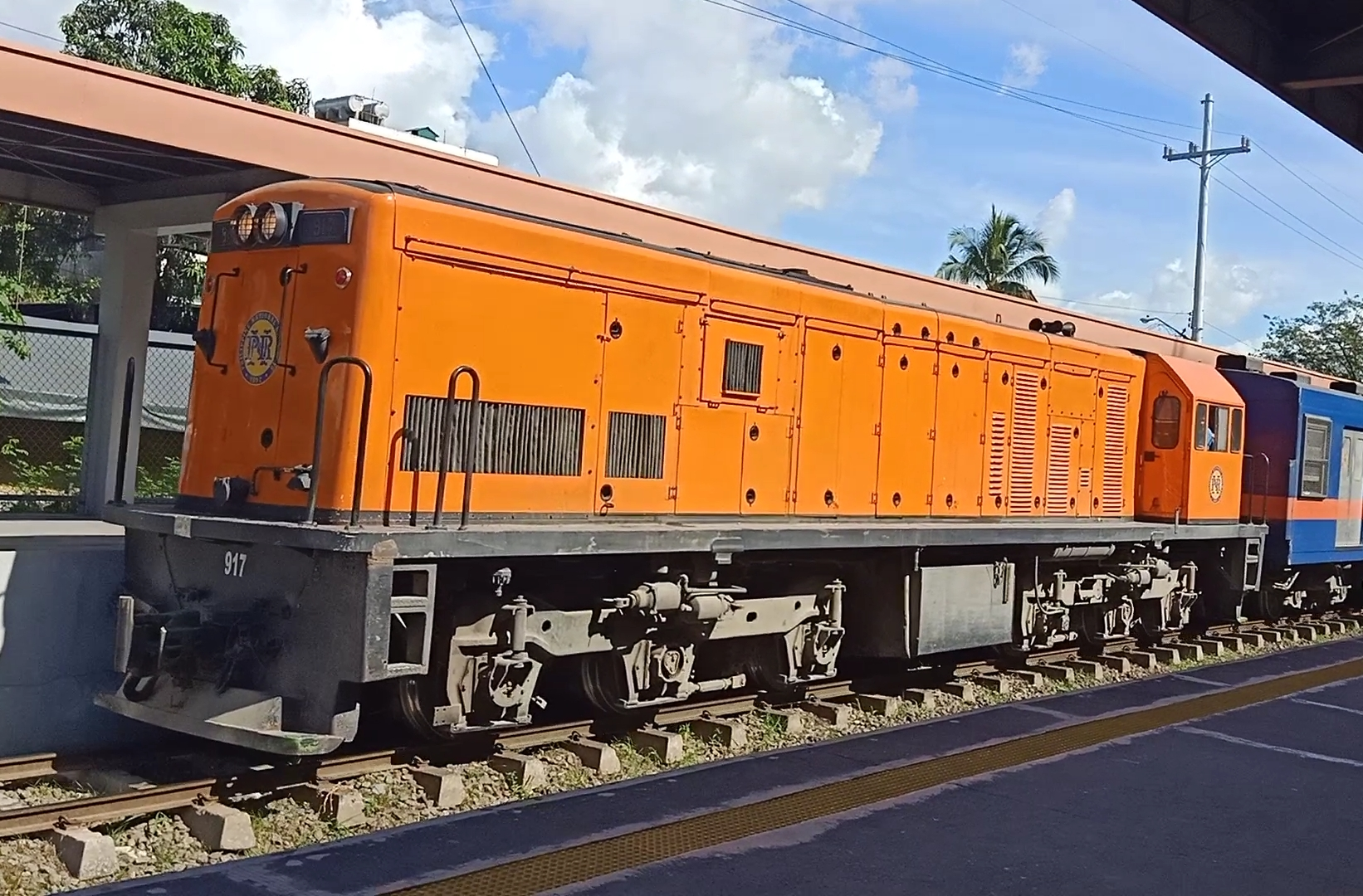
- 917 in pure orange livery. Rehabilitated by PNR in August 2019.
Type and origin
- Power type: Diesel-electric locomotive
- Builder: GE Transportation
- Serial number: 39238–39242; 41848–41857; 4753.1–4753.6
- Model: GE U14CP (901-905) GE U14C (906–915) GE U15C (917–922)
- Build date: 1973 (901–905); 1979 (906–915); 1991 (917–922)
- Total produced: 21
- Rebuilder: DESCO, Inc.
- Rebuild date: 2015–2017; 2019–2023; 2023-present
- Number rebuilt: 8
Specifications
- Configuration
  - AAR: C-C
  - UIC: Co'Co'
- Gauge: 1,067 mm (3 ft 6 in)
- Wheel diameter: 914 mm (36 in)
- Minimum curve: 30 degrees
- Wheelbase: 10,782 mm (35 ft 4.5 in)
  - Bogie: 3,188 mm (10 ft 5.5 in)
- Length
  - Over couplers: 15,214 mm (49 ft 11.0 in)
- Width: 2,753 mm (9 ft 0.4 in)
- Height: 3,874 mm (12 ft 8.5 in)
- Axle load: 13,720 kg (30,250 lb)
- Loco weight: 82,320 kg (181,480 lb)
- Fuel type: Fuel oil
- Fuel capacity: 2,700 L (590 imp gal; 710 US gal)
- Prime mover: GE 7FDL-8
- RPM range: 400–1,050 rpm (6.7–17.5 Hz)
  - RPM idle: 400 rpm (6.7 Hz) (Note: Minimum)
  - Maximum RPM: 1,050 rpm (17.5 Hz)
- Engine type: 4-stroke diesel engine
- Aspiration: Elliott H-584 turbocharger
- Alternator: GMG-146
- Generator: DC 10 pole GE GT601
- Traction motors: 4 × GE 761
- Cylinders: V8
- Transmission: AC/DC
- Gear ratio: 93:18
- MU working: Not Indicated
- Loco brake: Dynamic and air
Performance figures
- Maximum speed: 103 km/h (64 mph)
- Power output: 1,000 kW (1,400 hp)
- Tractive effort
  - Starting: 250 kN (57,000 lbf) at 30%
  - Continuous: 242 kN (54,300 lbf) at 13 km/h (8 mph)
- Factor of adh.
  - Starting: 25%
  - Continuous: 20%
- Brakeforce: undisclosed
Career
- Operators: Philippine National Railways
- Class: 900 class
- Number in class: 21
- Numbers: 901–915 & 917-922
- Nicknames: Ponkan
- Locale: Entire PNR network
- Delivered: 1973, 1979, 1991
- First run: 1974
- Restored: 2015–2017; 2019–2023
- Scrapped: 1981–2009
- Current owner: Philippine National Railways
- Disposition: 4 active, 10 inactive, 8 scrapped

The PNR 900 class is a class of 21 GE Universal Series diesel–electric locomotives operated by the Philippine National Railways since 1973. The locomotives comes with three different types: U14CP (1973), U14C (1979), and U15C (1991). Initially used for long-distance express services throughout Luzon, they were relegated to hauling commuter trains within Metro Manila, a task previously done by PNR's diesel multiple units fleet. This was further exacerbated by the closure of the PNR South Main Line's intercity section in 2012 after an accident in Sariaya, Quezon.

== History ==
The GE U14C and U15C are second-generation Universal Series road switchers specially built by GE Transportation for the Philippine National Railways. These were ordered in the 1970s to augment and eventually replace the aging diesel locomotive fleet purchased by PNR's predecessor, the Manila Railroad Company. The locomotives to be replaced include the 1000 class streamliners and the 2000 class roadswitchers, the latter being a first-generation Universal Series locomotive and both entered service in 1956. Despite the earlier diesel locomotives initially having 4 digits, the numbering scheme for the new 900 class has three and seems to follow the numbering scheme of the Manila Railroad 800 class USA locomotives built 30 years prior.

The first batch of five GE U14C prototype locomotives was ordered in 1973 for ₱10 million (equivalent to US$9.07 million in 2021) and were constructed by GE in Erie, Pennsylvania. The last two units were delivered in February 1974. A second order of ten U14C locomotives were ordered in the late 1970s and were also built in Pennsylvania. They arrived between January and February 1979.

The locomotives were used on various express services throughout the PNR network such as the Amianan Express and the Bicol Express. Locomotives used on the North Main Line locomotives are distinguishable from its southern counterparts by the color of the "whiskers" on the cab, with the former being colored white and the latter being colored light yellow. At the same time, the long-distance coaching stock were given a dark green and yellow livery to suit the locomotives.

The last six locomotives were built by GE in the former Montreal Locomotive Works plant in Montreal, Quebec, Canada. They entered service in 1992 together with the ten 5000 class locomotives, and had a red paint that will be later incorporated into the Philippines 2000 livery. At the same time, earlier locomotives such as 902 were repainted in the same paint scheme. These locomotives were mostly used for Metrotren commuter rail services in the 1990s until the late 2000s.

=== Rehabilitation ===
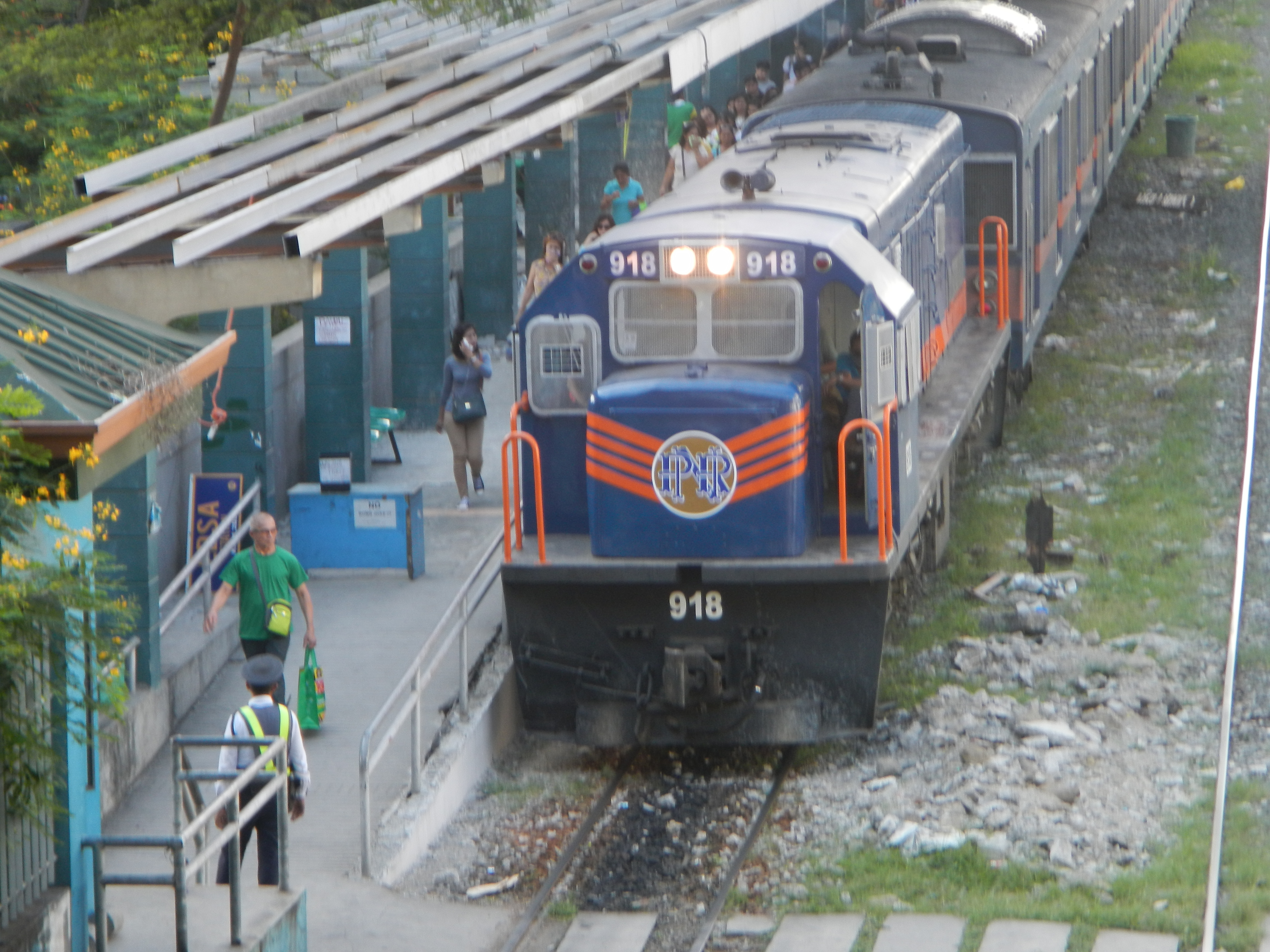
918 after being rehabilitated in DESCO.

In 2014, PNR signed a contract consortium deal with Miescorrail (now MRail), a subsidiary of Meralco and Desco Inc. to upgrade its locomotives. It is PNR's first upgrade to its 26 locomotives since its acquisition in 1992.

The deal involves the disassembly of two of the three locomotives in the first quarter of 2015. The diesel engines will be shipped to a GE facility for a complete upgrade including the installation of the GE Bright Star (BSS) engine control system, a micro-processor based computerized system to provide reliable and efficient performance of the engine. Meanwhile, the brakes and alternators will be repaired by Desco and MRail. The refurbishment started in 2015, and Desco and MRail handed over the two locomotives in February 2017.

From 2019, PNR repainted the locomotives to an orange livery in anticipation of the arrival of the new trains from PT INKA. 8 locomotives are currently in the orange livery as of November 2022.

Since 2020, DESCO Inc. is the company carrying out rehabilitation of the 900 class locomotives, having rehabilitated four locomotives from this class.

== Design ==
=== GE U14CP and U14C ===
The U14C Prototypes and U14C are the same with only a few difference which is the batch number, engine block, radiator grills, and date of arrival. the U14C Prototypes belong to the first batch while the U14C were the second batch. The U14Cs don't have numbering signage, however, during their rehabilitation process, they now include number signs with lights and wipers were working again.

=== GE U15C (later batch) ===
Compared to the U14Cs, the U15Cs features number signs. When they were rehabilitated, they feature number lights.

== Build numbers ==
| Locomotive number | Build number | Design | Year | Place built | References |
|---|---|---|---|---|---|
| 901 | 39238 | u14cp | 1973 | Erie, Pennsylvania | |
| 902 | 39239 | u14cp | 1973 | Erie, Pennsylvania | |
| 903 | 39240 | u14cp | 1973 | Erie, Pennsylvania | |
| 904 | 39241 | u14cp | 1973 | Erie, Pennsylvania | |
| 905 | 39242 | u14cp | 1973 | Erie, Pennsylvania | |
| 906 | 41848 | u14c | 1979 | Erie, Pennsylvania | |
| 907 | 41849 | u14c | 1979 | Erie, Pennsylvania | |
| 908 | 41850 | u14c | 1979 | Erie, Pennsylvania | |
| 909 | 41851 | u14c | 1979 | Erie, Pennsylvania | |
| 910 | 41852 | u14c | 1979 | Erie, Pennsylvania | |
| 911 | 41853 | u14c | 1979 | Erie, Pennsylvania | |
| 912 | 41854 | u14c | 1979 | Erie, Pennsylvania | |
| 913 | 41855 | u14c | 1979 | Erie, Pennsylvania | |
| 914 | 41856 | u14c | 1979 | Erie, Pennsylvania | |
| 915 | 41857 | u14c | 1979 | Erie, Pennsylvania | |
| 917 | 4753.1 | u15c | 1991 | Montreal, Canada | |
| 918 | 4753.2 | u15c | 1991 | Montreal, Canada | |
| 919 | 4753.3 | u15c | 1991 | Montreal, Canada | |
| 920 | 4753.4 | u15c | 1991 | Montreal, Canada | |
| 921 | 4753.5 | u15c | 1991 | Montreal, Canada | |
| 922 | 4753.6 | u15c | 1991 | Montreal, Canada | |

== Status ==
As of November 2026, there are eight (8) units that are serviceable and six (6) units that are not in service. Among the serviceable units, four (4) are active, while the other four (4) are inactive due to various reasons. Among the units that are not in service, one (1) is undergoing/finishing repairs, one (1) is unserviceable, and three (3) are Beyond Economical Repair.

With the closure of the Metro Commuter, most of the serviceable units are currently idle and used for internal movements aside from 917 in the Bicol Region.

| Image | Number | Status | Description | Liveries |
|---|---|---|---|---|
| | 901 | Scrapped | 901, the first locomotive to be built and ironically, the first locomotive to be scrapped after being involved in a derailment in 1979. | Green Livery |
| | 902 | Inactive | 902 is sometimes used as a miscellaneous train hauler between Tutuban and Caloocan. It served the last trip of the Alabang-Biñan segment together with EMU 07 and 921 before its closure to give way for the NSCR Project. It is the oldest serviceable locomotive in the fleet and the only U14C Prototype in service since 1974. | Bagong Pilipinas Orange Livery (since 2024) |
| | 903 | Scrapped | It is one of the units in the list that were scrapped in 2009. Lack of funds for rehabilitation resulted the unit being in the list to be scrapped and serve as a source of spare parts. | Red Livery |
| | 904 | Scrapped | It was renumbered as 908 when the original 908 became 916, and later became included in the list of units that were later scrapped in 2009. | Red Livery |
| | 905 | Scrapped | 905 was scrapped after colliding with 910 at Quezon Province on December 31, 1982. This catastrophic incident led the units to become the second pair in the list to be decommissioned after 901. | Yellow Livery |
| | 906 | Inactive | 906 is declared Beyond Economical Repair (BER) at Caloocan Workshop. The unit became a source of spare parts for the other units in the 900 class, mostly for DEL 902 and the later batches in the fleet which are the U15C locomotives. | Navy Blue Livery |
| | 907 | Scrapped | The exact reason why 907 was sent to scrap is unknown. Parts of her hood is said to be found on 919 today. The image of the unit is displayed inside the Tutuban station. | Green Livery |
| | 908 | Active | 908 was known for being targeted by the NPAs after it struck an insurgent's son in the 1980s. It raised safety concerns to its train drivers, forcing PNR officials to renumber it as '916.' 916 is currently serving as the main miscellaneous train hauler between Tutuban and Caloocan, along with 918. These two units (914 and 916) are reportedly marked as the last pair that will be rehabilitated by DESCO. | Bagong Pilipinas Orange Livery (Since 2024) |
| | 909 | Scrapped | It is the last locomotive unit active before being sent to scrap in 2009. It became a source of spare parts for other units. | Navy Blue Livery |
| | 910 | Scrapped | It was scrapped after colliding with 905 at Quezon Province on December 31, 1982. This catastrophic incident led the units to become the second pair in the list to be decommissioned after 901. | Yellow Livery |
| | 911 | Inactive | 911 has returned to Tutuban Yard after previously being hauled to Caloocan Workshops. The locomotive is nearing completion. | Orange Livery (first seen in a photo with the livery in September 2023) |
| | 912 | Scrapped | The unit was bombed by the New People's Army (NPA) in the 1980s. The severe damage led the unit to be immediately withdrawn from revenue service and scrapped. | Yellow Livery |
| | 913 | Inactive | 913 is sometimes used as a miscellaneous train hauler between Tutuban and Caloocan. It is one of the three oldest active U14C locomotives. The unit is also known for serving as the last trip of the Tutuban-Calamba route in July 2023 hauling EMU Set 07. | Bagong Pilipinas Orange Livery (since 2024) |
| | 914 | Inactive | It is currently sitting in Tutuban Yard. These two units (914 and 916) are reportedly marked as the last pair that will be rehabilitated by DESCO. | Bagong Pilipinas Orange Livery (Since 2024) |
| | 915 | Inactive | 915 was declared Beyond Economical Repair (BER) at Caloocan Workshop. | Navy Blue Livery |
| | 917 | Active | 917 is currently serving as a Yard Shunter and Work Train in Naga. It introduced the orange livery of the 900 class as the first unit to wear the new livery in the fleet. | Orange Livery (since August 2019) |
| | 918 | Active | 918 is currently serving as the main DEL being used for miscellaneous train hauler between Tutuban and Caloocan, along with 916 (908). | Bagong Pilipinas Orange Livery (since 2024) |
| | 919 | Inactive | It was last seen serving as a yard shunter in Tutuban. It is currently at the Tutuban Yard after being hauled from the Caloocan Workshops in an unserviceable condition. | MRAIL Blue Orange Livery |
| | 920 | Inactive | 920 was written off of service following two major crossing mishaps in 2001. She was to be revived using parts from retired locomotives but was unsuccessful upon discovering of her bent frame. Currently Beyond Economical Repair. | Navy Blue Livery |
| | 921 | Active | 921 is currently used as a miscellaneous train hauler between Tutuban and Caloocan. It served the last trip of the Alabang-Biñan segment together with EMU 07 and 902 before its closure to give way for the NSCR Project. | Bagong Pilipinas Orange Livery (since 2024) |
| | 922 | Inactive | 922 sometimes serves as a miscellaneous train hauler between Tutuban and Caloocan. It is known for surviving two remarkable incidents, the 2004 Padre Burgos Derailment and the 2012 Bicol Express Derailment, compared to its doomed sister units that sustained irreparable damage from similar incidents and being scrapped as a result. | Bagong Pilipinas Orange Livery (since 2024) |

== Incidents and accidents ==
The PNR 900 class locomotives has been involved in various incidents, mostly of derailments, engine malfunctions, collisions, and even attacks by the NPAs (New People's Army) during the 1980s.

=== 1970s ===
- 901 was involved in a derailment in 1979. The locomotive was the first to be built and yet the first to be scrapped.
- 908 reportedly hit Bim Bassman (Jian Garcia)'s son sometime in the mid-1980s. The officer retaliated by targeting the unit on several occasions, such as throwing stones, firing bullets, and even hurling a grenade which detonated and injured crew members. This resulted to a move that made PNR officials renumber 908 as 916 to avoid further attacks on the locomotive.
- 912 was bombed by the New People's Army (NPA) during the tenure of the late President Marcos Sr. in the 1980s. The locomotive was written off.
- On December 31, 1982, 905 and 910 collided between Hondagua and Calauag Stations at Quezon Province. Both drivers were given Line Clear Certificate by the Station Masters in both stations (905 was heading Northbound, NB while 910 was heading Southbound, SB).

=== 2000s ===
- 920 collided with a dump truck in Iriga while travelling to Legazpi in 2001. Its twisted chassis resulted to its declaration as Beyond Economical Repair (BER). PNR had plans to revive 920 by placing the cab from 904.
- 922 was involved in the Padre Burgos derailment on November 12, 2004. The Manila-bound Bicol Express train derailed and fell into a ravine, killing 10 people and injuring 160 more. This later ordered for a total halt for all intercity services of the PNR until the following year, only to be suspended again a year later due to line damages.

=== 2010s (26 October 2012 - 2 October 2019) ===
==== 2012 ====
- On October 26, 922 hauling coaches servicing as Bicol Express Train 611 rolled over while traveling on a rainy weather in Sariaya, Quezon. The bridge was washed out, causing the coaches to roll over. The rainfall was caused by Typhoon Son-Tinh (known as Tropical Storm Ofel). As a result of the incident, five passengers were injured, and the Bicol Express was suspended indefinitely although intercity services continued until 2013.

==== 2015 ====
- On October 12, MSC 1300 performed by the 914 and a 203 series EMU stopped near Nichols station because of engine overheating coming from the locomotive. 2535 was sent to rescue the breakdown train.

==== 2017 ====
- On July 7, an ambulance was hit by 916 near Blumentritt Station in Manila.

==== 2018 ====
- On June 23, 919's cab was damaged after a collision with a truck at a railway crossing near Paco Station.

==== 2019 ====
- On September 11, 916 hauling a 203 series EMU stopped at Paco station. A few moments later, 916's engine started overheating.
- On October 2, a man was run over by 917 at the Abad Santos Triangle in Tondo, Manila. The man died as a result of the incident.

=== 2020s (13 April 2020 - 18 April 2023) ===
==== 2020 ====
- On April 13, amidst the Enhanced Community Quarantine (ECQ) in Luzon due to the COVID-19 pandemic, 921 was going south when a group of residents barricaded a portion of the rail tracks in Calamba, Laguna that prevented it from entering the barangay that was under a total lockdown.

==== 2022 ====
- On April 12, 921 performing MSC operations run over a child whose age is between 9 and 12 years old at the intersection of Antipolo Street and Ipil Street in Sta. Cruz, Manila.

==== 2023 ====
- On April 18, 913 hauling a recently refurbished 203 series EMU derailed near Don Bosco crossing in Makati after a wooden ties broke that separated the rails and later caused the derailment. No casualties have been reported and full operations returned three days after the derailment.

== Liveries ==
The PNR 900 class, as well as the PNR 2500 class and the PNR 5000 class, were painted in various liveries.

=== Green Livery ===
This is the first livery of the 900 class. The livery has two variations, locomotives with white whiskers are designated for northern trips to La Union, while those with yellow whiskers are designated for southern trips to Bicol.

However, shortage of available locomotives for southern trips caused some locomotives with white whiskers running on the PNR South Main Line despite being designated for the PNR North Main Line. There were some units that skipped the Yellow-Green livery and retained this livery until they were repainted into the 2000s livery. The livery was in use from 1973 until 1990.

=== Yellow-Orange Livery ===
Another livery worn by the 900 class when they were newly delivered. It featured a Yellow body with Orange stripes. Only a few locomotives have ever worn the livery. The livery was used from 1973 to 1980.

=== Yellow-Green Livery ===
Also known as 'Olive-green'. It is the third livery used for the 900 class. It featured green whiskers and the PNR logo. It was used from 1980 to 1990.

=== Red Livery ===
Prior to the arrival of the U15C batch and the 5000 class in 1991, The current batches which are the U14Cs and the 2500 class were repainted in this livery. The newer ones had a black cowcatcher and lining. The older ones were yellow. Moreover, the U10Bs featured a Metrotren signage at the front.

The livery was used from 1991 until the 2000.

=== Blue Livery ===
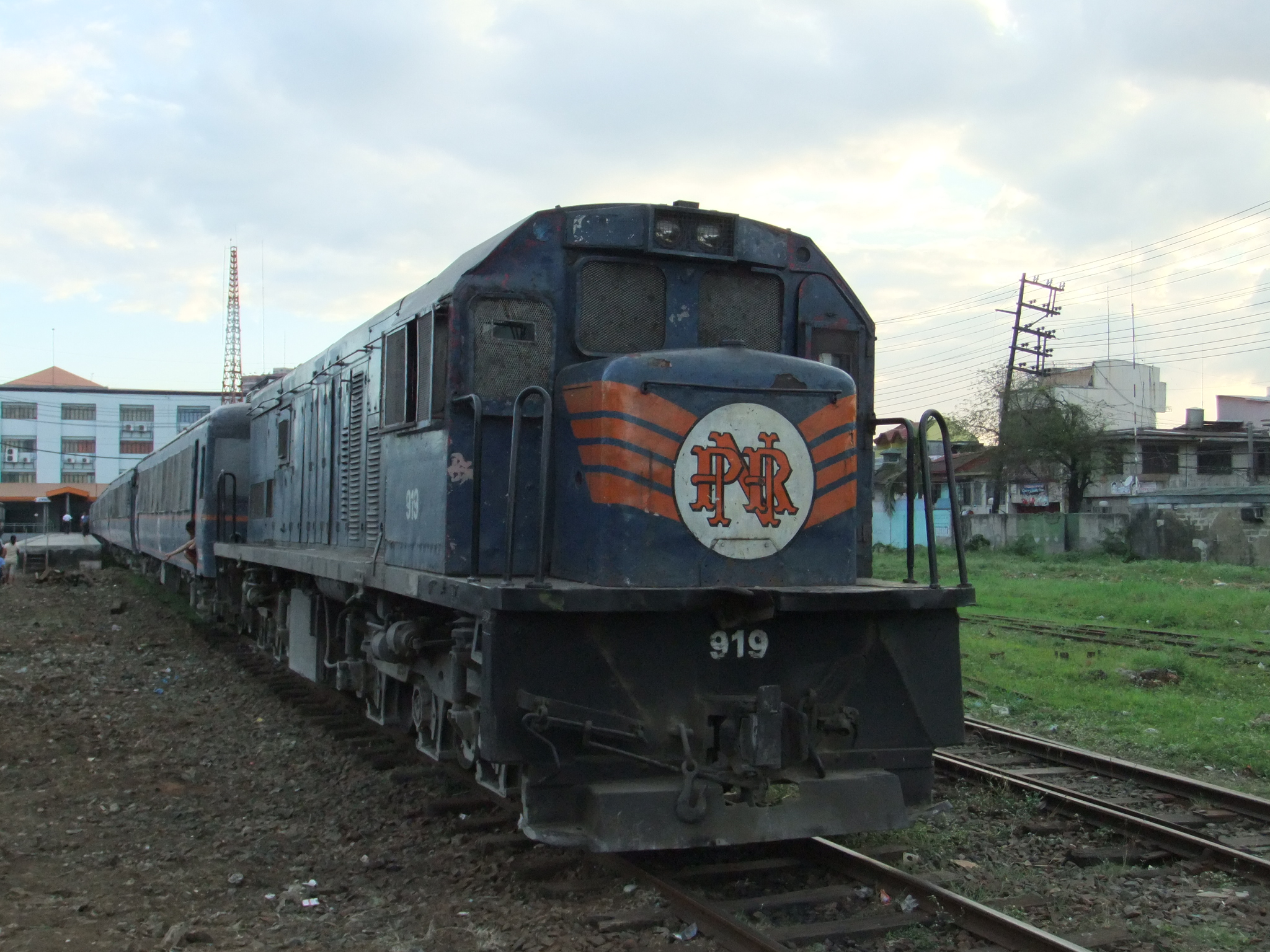
919 at Tutuban station.

It is also called the Blue whale. All the units in the 900 class were repainted with this livery. Even the locomotives that are declared Beyond Economical Repair (BER) in Caloocan Workshop were repainted in Blue livery except for 5010.

The livery was used from 2001 to 2010.

=== Filtrack Livery ===
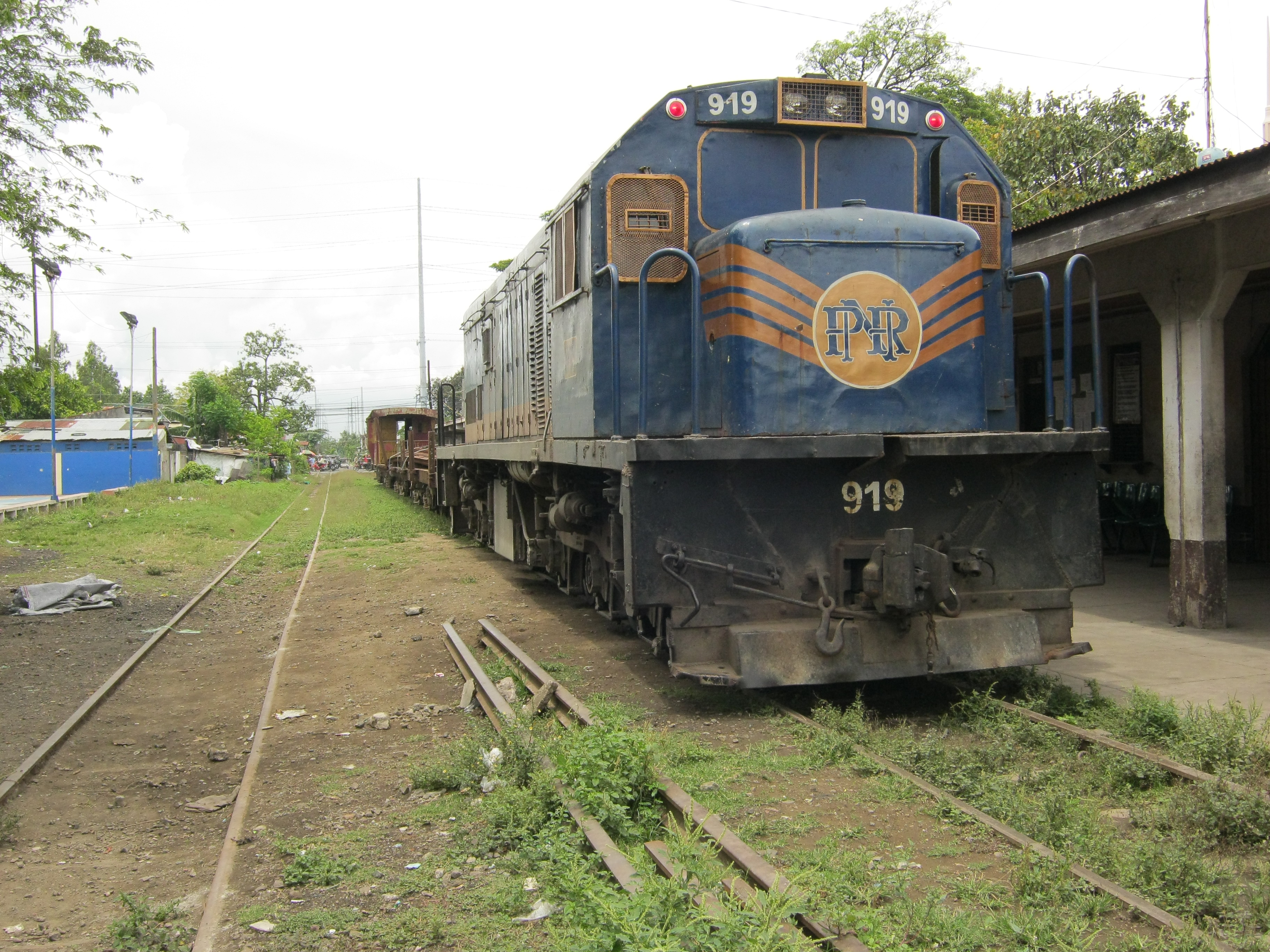
919 at Biñan. (2012)

Before the reopening of the Bicol Express, the locomotives were repainted in Filtrack livery. Locomotives with this livery were designated for the Bicol commuter line.

The livery lasted until 2013 when intercity services on the PNR South Main Line were suspended after the derailment of the Bicol Express on October 26, 2012.

=== Blue-Orange Livery ===
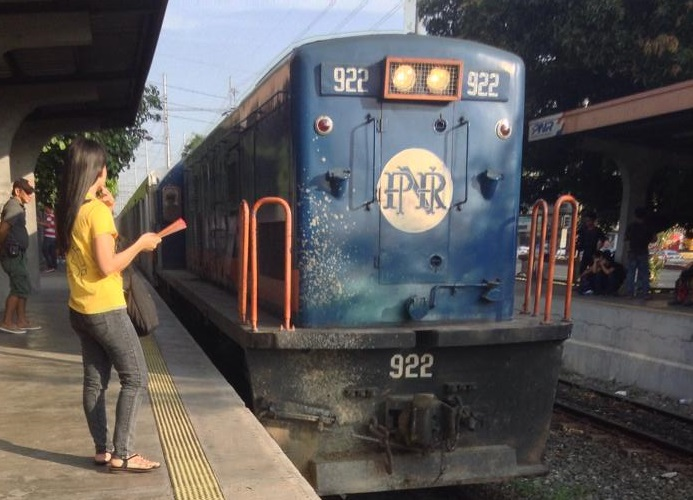
922 arriving Vito Cruz station.

It is called Blue-Orange livery as the locomotives featured orange whiskers and orange lining on its sides.

=== Orange Livery ===
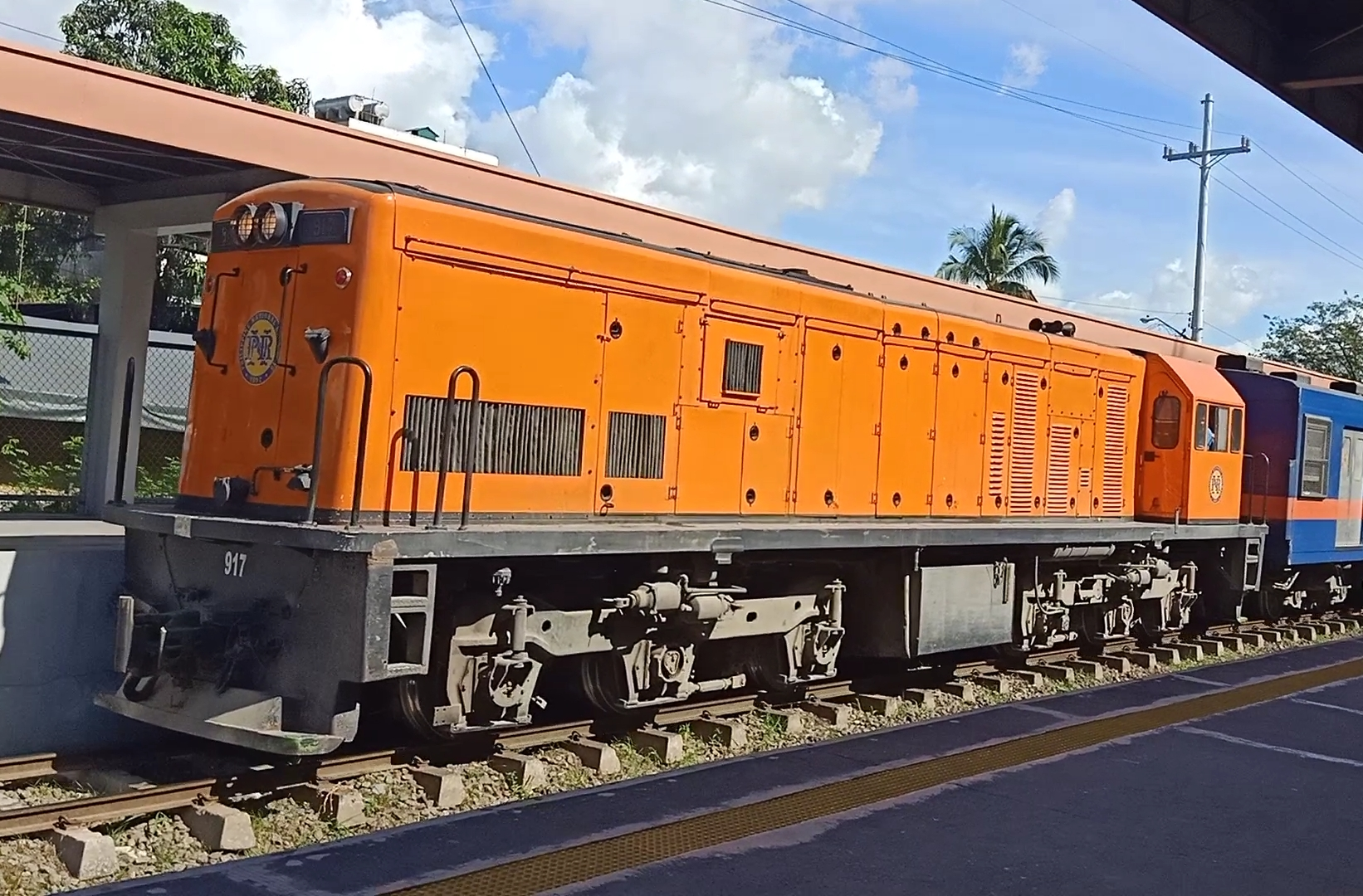
917 at España station.

It is also called by railfans as 'Ponkan' and 'Magno-era Livery.'

=== Bagong Pilipinas Livery ===
This new livery, as first spotted on DEL 913 in 2024, is a variant of the Orange livery. It features a darker orange paint with a thicker black lining, an additional orange lining at the chassis, PNR lettering at the hood, "Bagong Pilipinas" stickers, and blue "whiskers".

The livery also marks the comeback of the red PNR logo for DELs 2540 and 5009 in Naga.

== Captures ==
These are pictures taken by railfans in a good angle. Pictures are arranged in chronological order based on their build numbers.

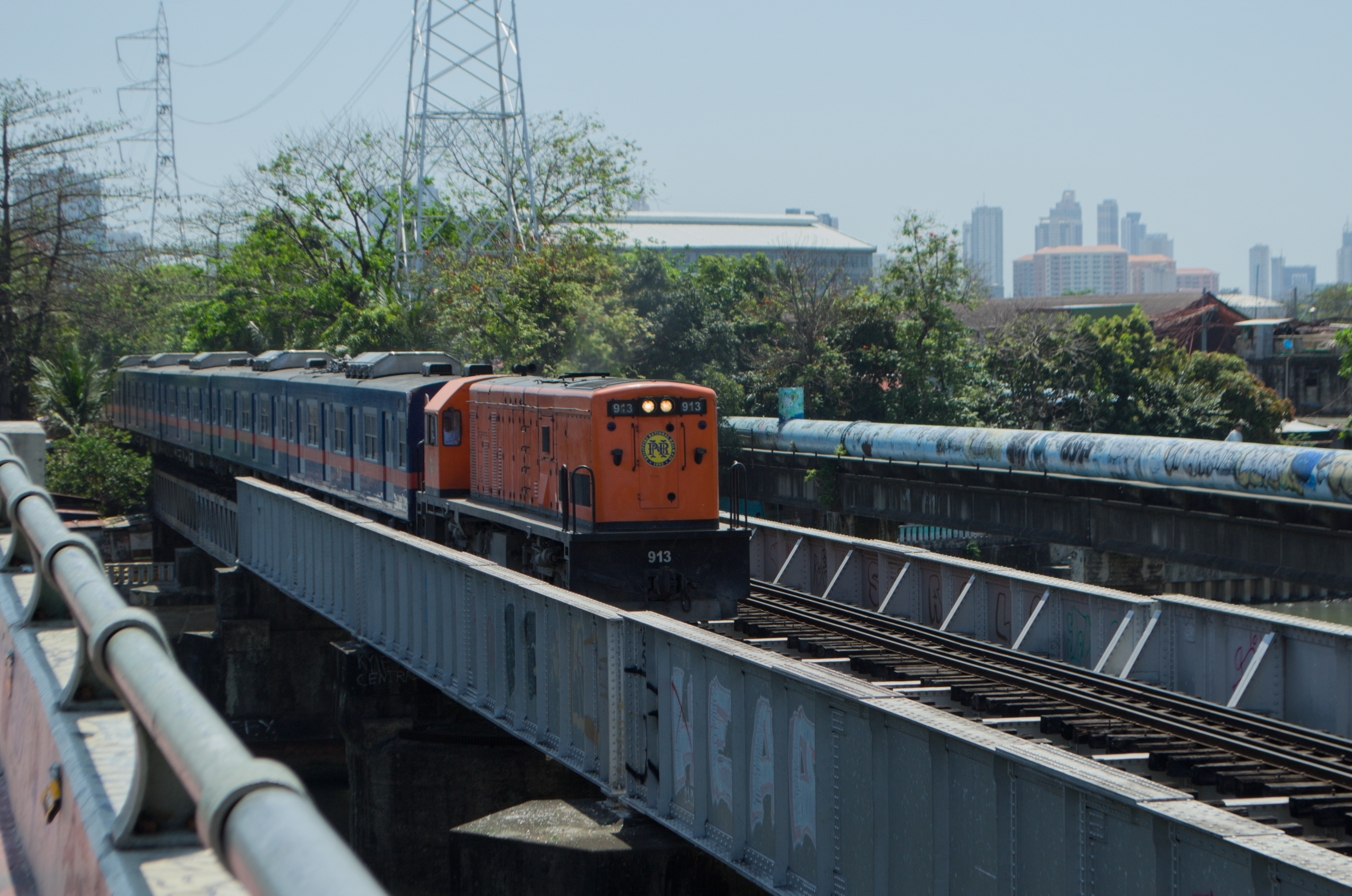
913 crossing the Pasig River.

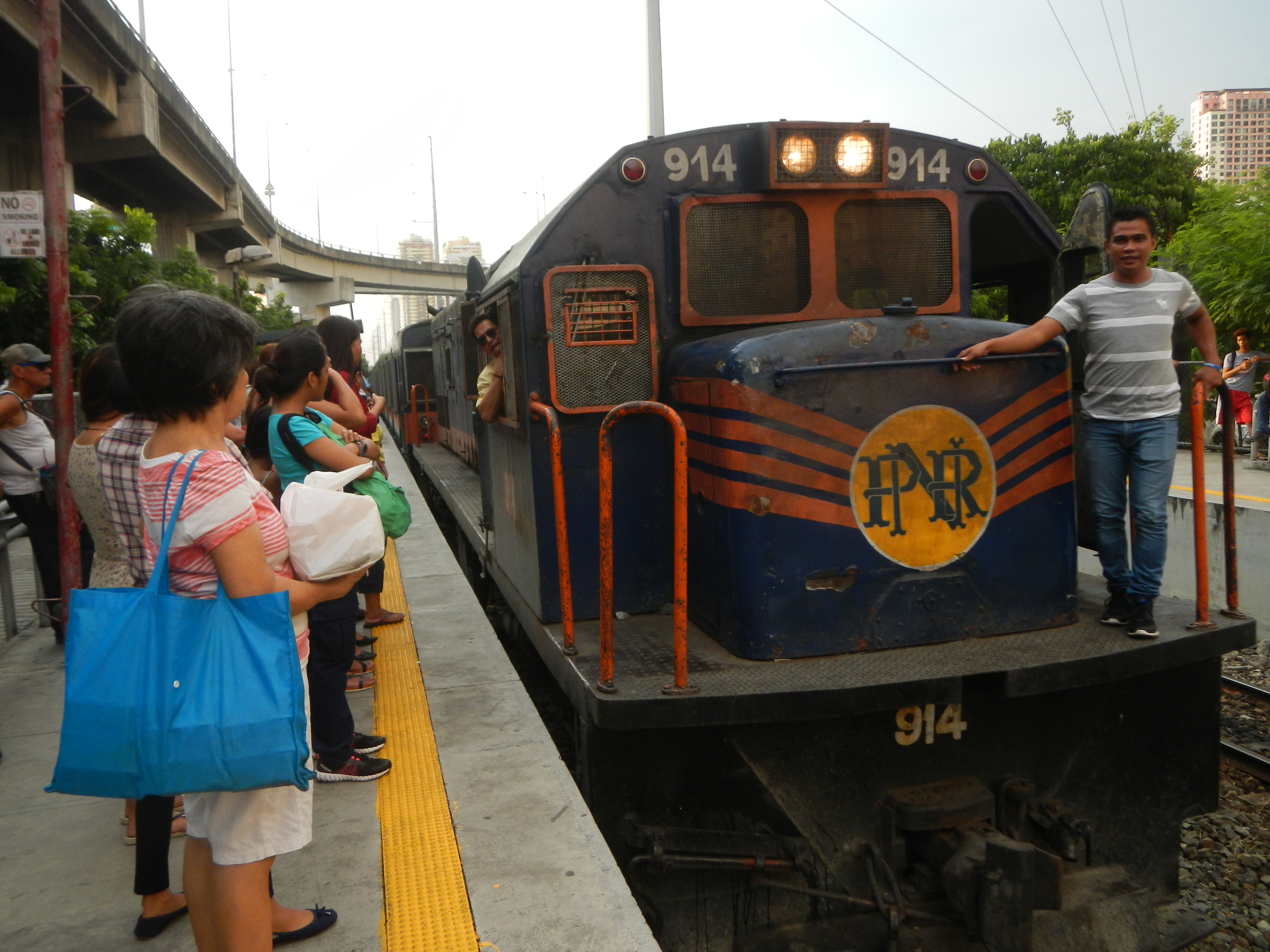
914 at Pasay Road station.

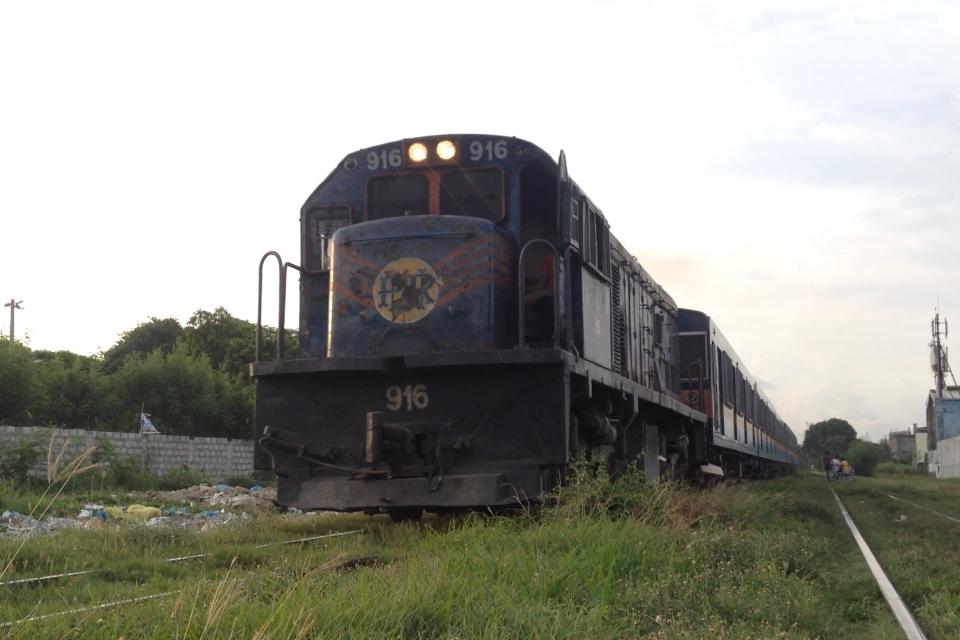
916 wearing the Blue-orange livery at Posadas Crossing.

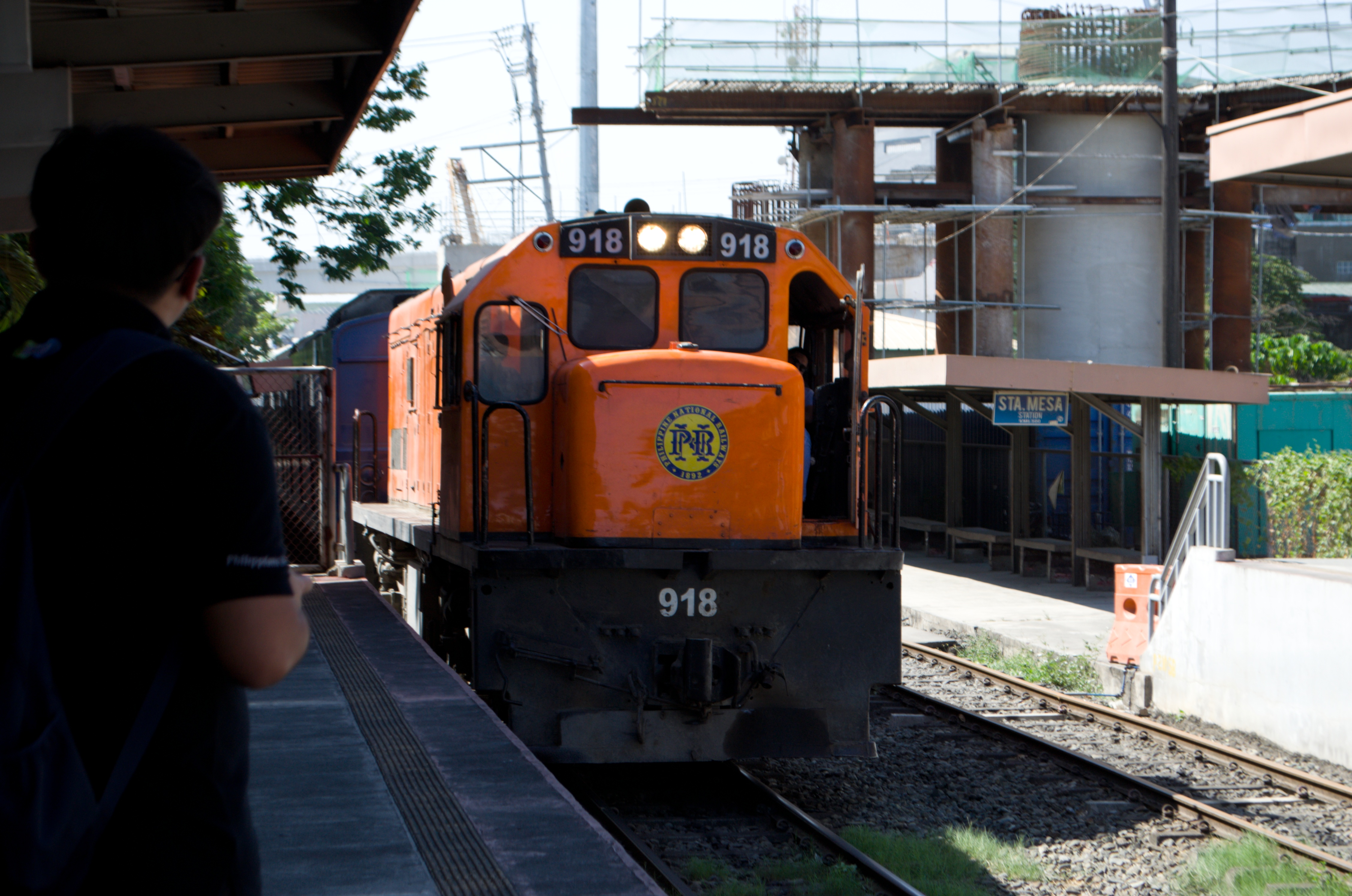
918 at Santa Mesa station.

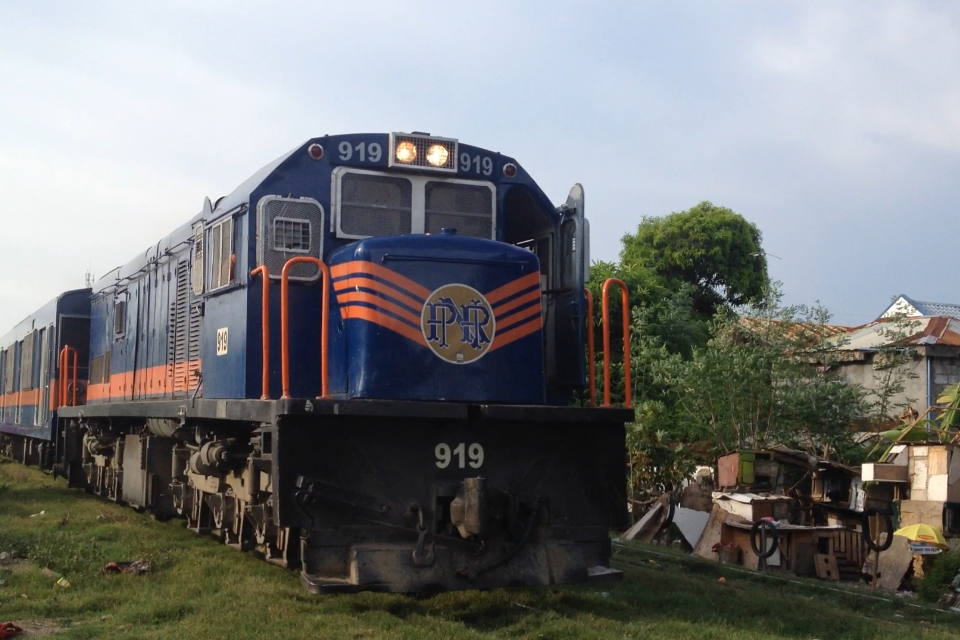
919 at Posadas crossing.

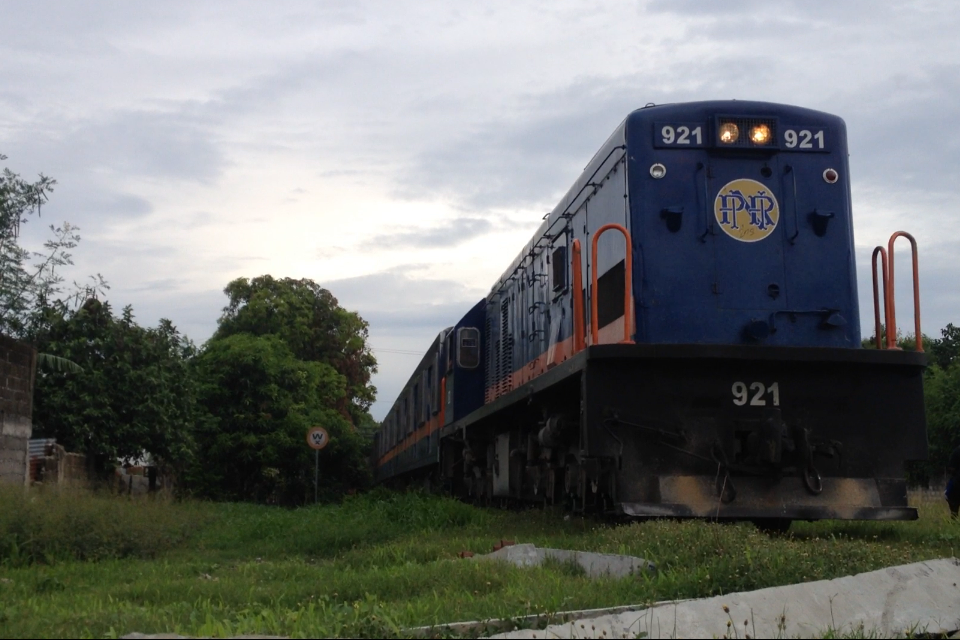
921 at Sucat, Muntinlupa.

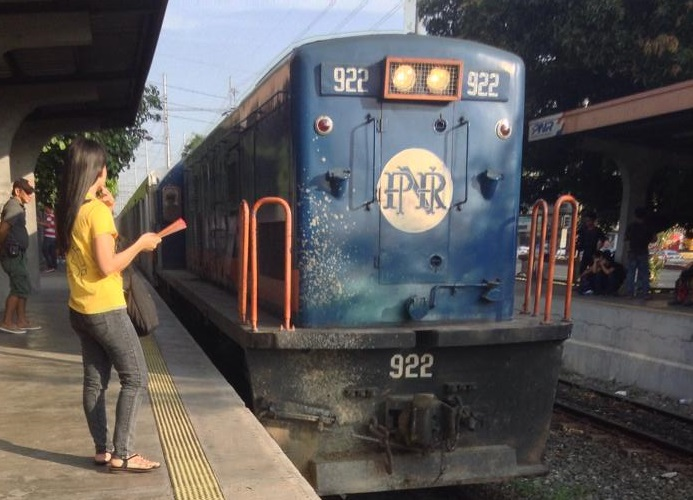
922 at Vito Cruz Station.

== See also ==
- PNR 2500 Class
- PNR 5000 Class
- INKA CC300
- South African Class 35-000 – another diesel-electric locomotive based on the GE U15C model
