= GE UM12C =

Type of diesel-electric locomotive

Manila Railroad 2000 class GE UM12C
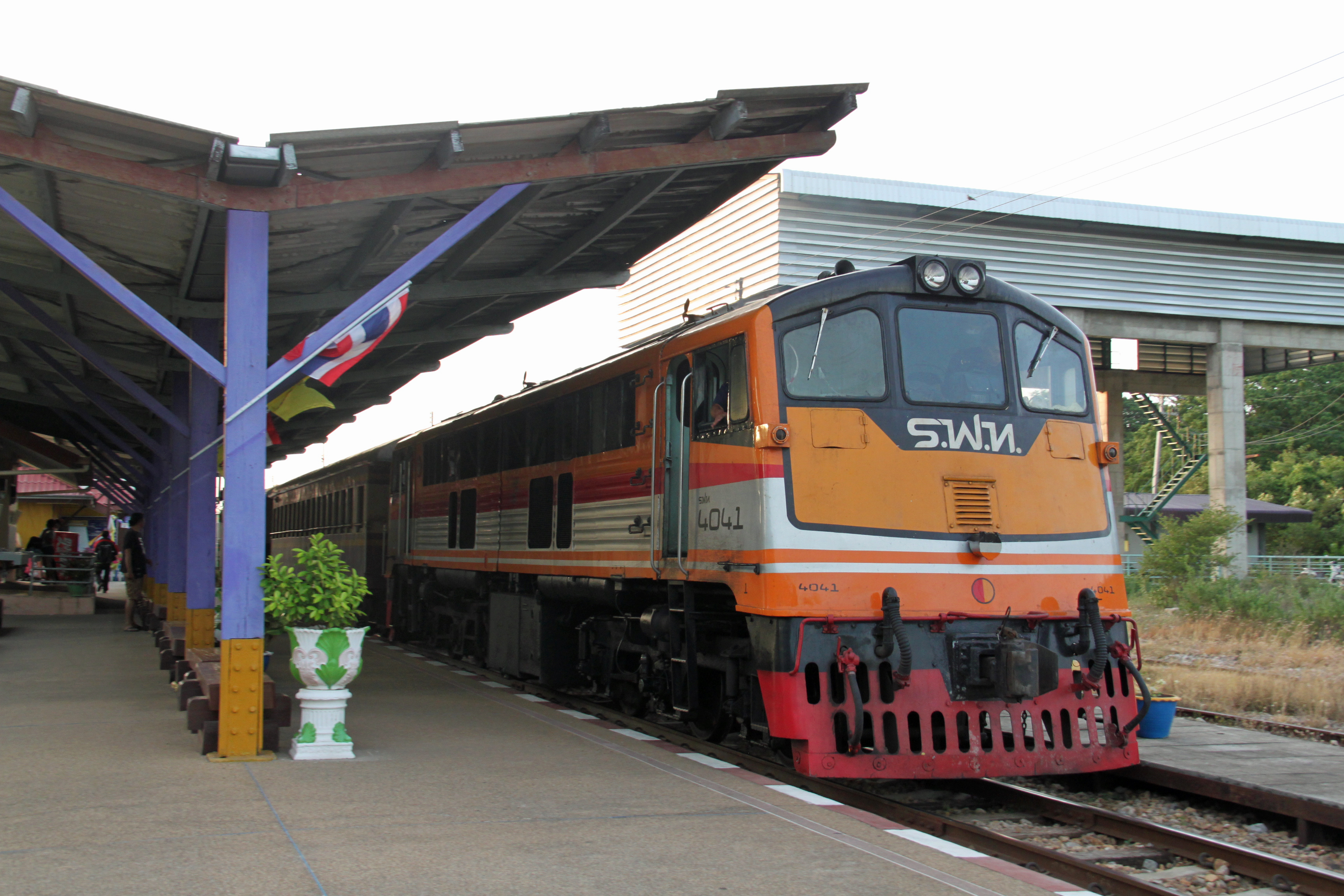
Type and origin
- Power type: Diesel-electric
- Builder: GE Transportation Systems
- Serial number: 32454-32463 (2001-2020; PNR); 34850-34889 (4001-4040; SRT); 35947-35956 (4041-4050; SRT)
- Model: UM12C
- Build date: 1956; 1963,1966
- Total produced: 20 (PNR); 50 (SRT)
Specifications
- Configuration
  - AAR: C-C
  - UIC: Co'Co'
- Gauge: 1,067 mm (3 ft 6 in) (PNR); 1,000 mm (3 ft 3 3/8 in) (SRT)
- Wheel diameter: 914 mm (36.0 in)
- Length: 16,288 mm (53 ft 5.3 in)
- Width: 2,794 mm (9 ft 2.0 in)
- Height: 3,753 mm (12 ft 3.8 in)
- Loco weight: 70.178 ton (empty); 75.00 ton (in working order)
- Fuel type: Diesel
- Prime mover: Cummins KT38L (SRT); Cooper Bessemer (PNR)
- RPM range: 2,000 RPM
- Aspiration: Turbocharger
- Cylinders: V12
- Transmission: Diesel-electric
- Train brakes: Combined air brake and vacuum brake
- Safety systems: DSD
Performance figures
- Maximum speed: 103 km/h (64 mph)
- Power output: 1,320 hp (0.98 MW)
Career
- Operators: Philippine National Railways; State Railway of Thailand
- Numbers: 2001-2020 (PNR); 4001-4050 (SRT)
- Official name: GE UM12C
- Nicknames: Grandpa (SRT)
- Locale: Luzon, Philippines; Thailand
- Delivered: February - June 1956 (PNR); 1964 (SRT)
- Retired: 1999 (PNR)
- Disposition: All scrapped (PNR); 45 in service, 5 retired (SRT)

The UM12C is a type of diesel-electric locomotive manufactured by GE for Southeast Asian rail operators. It is currently in service with the State Railway of Thailand. It was also operated by the Manila Railroad Company and the Philippine National Railways from 1956 until 1999. While the units for both companies feature a shovelnose layout, the MRR locomotives were single-ended and had a cowl unit cab, the SRT locomotives are double-ended cab forward units.

== MRR/PNR 2000 class ==
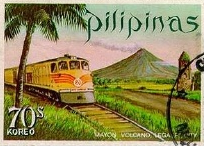
A 2000 class locomotive as it appeared in the 1960s.

The Manila Railroad Company (MRR) announced the dieselization of its locomotive fleet in 1954. GE Transportation was selected as the supplier of diesel-electric locomotives. The agency bought fifty units in which thirty were streamlined mainline locomotives and twenty were switchers. Twenty of these were the UM12C road switcher model MRR 2000 class. These were some of the first locomotives to feature the cowl unit design.

The locomotives were introduced to the MRR in 1956. Along with the cab unit 1000 class, they formed the mainline locomotive fleet in Luzon until the late 1970s and the early 1980s. Starting in 1973, a newer GE Universal Series type numbered the PNR 900 class was introduced on mainline passenger services. Due to its popularity on services such as the Amianan Express and the Bicol Express, it eventually replaced the 1000 and 2000 classes from passenger service. The 2000 class continued service until January 1999 and the remaining units were immediately scrapped.

== State Railway of Thailand ==
The State Railway of Thailand purchased 50 units of a meter gauge version of the UM12C. Unlike the Philippine version, it features a dual cab layout with a cab forward design. As of 2015, 45 units remain in service with the SRT.
