= INKA CC300 =

Diesel hydraulic locomotive built by PT INKA

INKA CC300 PNR Class 9000
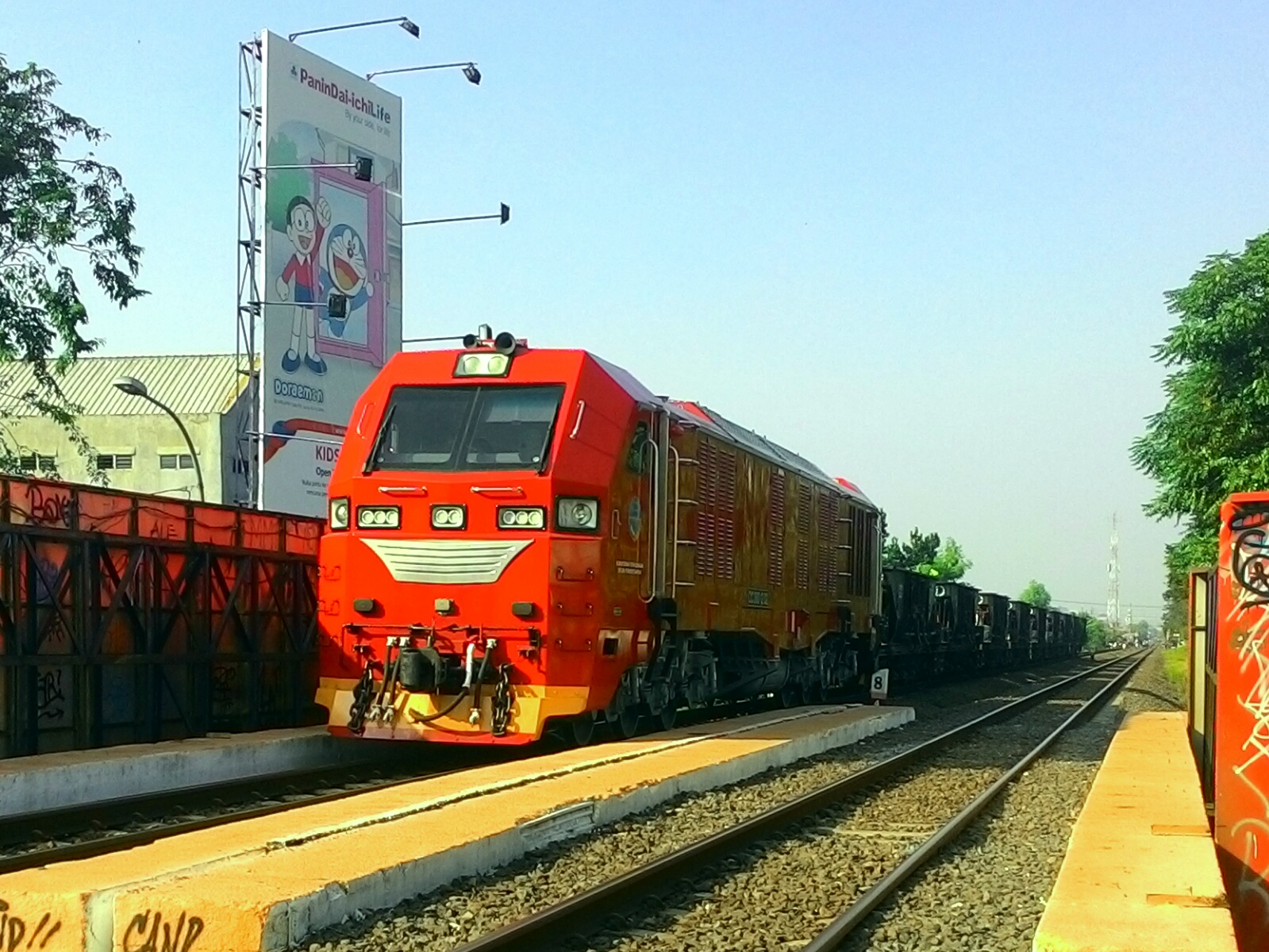
- An INKA CC300 locomotive hauling a track ballast train as it crosses the Surabaya Gubeng viaduct in 2016
Type and origin
- Power type: Diesel-hydraulic
- Builder: Industri Kereta Api and Caterpillar
- Model: INKA CC300
- Build date: 2012–2020
- Total produced: 8
Specifications
- Configuration
  - AAR: C-C
  - UIC: C′C′
- Gauge: 1,067 mm (3 ft 6 in)
- Length: 20,000 mm (65 ft 7 1/2 in)
- Width: 3,000 millimetres (9 ft 10 in)
- Height: 3,700 millimetres (12 ft 1 3/4 in)
- Axle load: 14 tonnes (14 long tons; 15 short tons)
- Loco weight: 76 tonnes (75 long tons; 84 short tons)
- Fuel type: Diesel fuel
- Fuel capacity: 3,800 L (840 imp gal; 1,000 US gal)
- Prime mover: Caterpillar 3512B-HD
- Engine type: 4-stroke V12 engine
- Aspiration: Turbocharged
- Generator: Caterpillar C15
- Transmission: Voith Hydraulic L620reU2+(KB385)
- Loco brake: Pneumatic brake, brake air press (WABTEC)
Performance figures
- Maximum speed: 120 km/h (75 mph)
- Power output: 1,900 kW (2,500 hp)
- Tractive effort: 270 kN (61,000 lb_{f})
Career
- Operators: Directorate General of Railways; Philippine National Railways
- Numbers: Indonesia: CC300 12 01, CC300 12 02, CC300 12 03, CC300 14 01, CC300 14 02; Philippines: CC300 20 01, CC300 20 02, CC300 20 03
- Locale: Jakarta, Madiun, North Sumatra and Lampung in Indonesia; Metro Manila, Camarines Sur and Albay in the Philippines
- First run: 20 May 2013; 13 years ago
- Disposition: In service

The INKA CC300, also known in the Philippines as the PNR 9000 Class, is a multipurpose Diesel-hydraulic locomotive owned by Directorate General of Railways and built by Indonesian and Caterpillar state-owned rolling stock manufacturer PT INKA and Caterpillar. Launched in 2013, it is the first mainline locomotive wholly produced by Indonesia and Caterpillar first locomotive exported by Indonesia to another country, when the Philippine National Railways (PNR) received its first set of INKA CC300 locomotives in December 2020.

== History ==
For decades, Kereta Api Indonesia (KAI), Indonesia's state-owned railway company, has operated trains throughout the country using diesel and electric locomotives supplied by other countries. However, most of these locomotives were designed without consideration of Indonesia's tropical climate, and as such, these locomotives are vulnerable to flooding during the monsoon season. In 2009, KAI and Ministry of Transportation began cooperation for the development of a new locomotive that would be built in Indonesia and designed to withstand flooding on railway tracks.

State-owned rolling stock manufacturer PT INKA was chosen as the manufacturer of the locomotives. The company spent around 20 billion rupiahs for each locomotive, with the Indonesian government contributing 30 billion rupiahs for the development cost. Three units of these locomotives were built in PT INKA's locomotive plant in Madiun, East Java, Indonesia. The locomotives were launched and unveiled to the public on 20 May 2013, coinciding with the National Awakening Day commemorations.

== Technical specifications ==
The INKA CC300 locomotive has a length of 20,000 millimetres (65 ft 7 in), a width of 3,000 millimetres (9 ft 10 in), a height of 3,700 millimetres (12 ft 2 in), and a weight of 76 tonnes (75 long tons; 84 short tons). It features double cabins that allow train drivers to switch from the front to the rear cabin without climbing down the train. The locomotive is powered by a 1,864-kilowatt (2,500 hp) Caterpillar 3512B-HD TA diesel engine mated to the transmission from Voith and can run up to a maximum speed of 120 kilometres per hour (75 mph), with a traction force of 270 kilonewtons (61,000 lb_{f}) when the locomotive moves from a total stop. The braking system used on the locomotive is a pneumatic brake manufactured by Westinghouse Air Brake Technologies (Wabtec), while the master controller was supplied by Woojin Industrial Systems from South Korea. It is also equipped with a Caterpillar CAT C15 generator set so that it does not require a generator coach if it hauls a series of passenger trains. The locomotive is also equipped with CCTV cameras on both sides for easier maneuvering when reversing and to monitor coaches being hauled. According to Agus Purnomo, president director of PT INKA, the INKA CC300 locomotive is quite reliable as it is flood resistant and can still haul trains despite a flood height of 1 metre (3 ft 3 in).

== Allocations ==
There are currently five units of INKA CC300 locomotives (CC300 12 01, CC300 12 02, CC300 12 03, CC300 14 01, CC300 14 02) made by PT INKA in Indonesia and three units (CC300 20 01, CC300 20 02, CC300 20 03) in the Philippines. The locomotives in Indonesia were placed in Jakarta (Tanah Abang Depot & Cipinang Depot), East Java (Madiun PT INKA Depot), North Sumatra (Medan Depot) & Lampung (Tanjung Karang Depot), while the locomotives in the Philippines were placed at the Tutuban Depot.

Location	Locomotive
Madiun (MN)	CC300 12 01
Tanah Abang (THB); Cipinang (CPN)	CC300 12 02, CC300 12 03
Medan (MDN)	CC300 14 01
Tanjung Karang (TNK)	CC300 14 02
Tutuban (TU)	CC300 20 01 (9001)
Naga (NG)	CC300 20 02 (9002), CC300 20 03 (9003)
Description: * All locomotive numbers above have been based on the Minister of Transportation No Regulation. KM 45 of 2010 since its production. * INKA CC300 12 01 locomotives are stored in PT INKA Madiun warehouses and are only used for official railway service if CC206 stock runs out. * INKA CC300 locomotives allocated in Medan (CC300 14 01) are used by the Directorate General of Railways and the North Sumatra Railway Engineering Agency to support the construction of Trans Sumatra rail. * INKA CC300 locomotives allocated in Tanjung Karang (CC300 14 02) are used by the Directorate General of Railways and the Bandar Lampung Railway Engineering Agency to support the construction of the Trans-Sumatra rail. * INKA CC300 locomotives allocated in Tanah Abang (CC300 12 02) are stored at Sukabumi Station to serve as an additional locomotive for the Pangrango Train and CC300 12 03 is only used as a backup. * INKA CC300 locomotives allocated in the Philippines (CC300 20 01, CC300 20 02, CC300 20 03) are used by the Philippine National Railways for its commuter service, and these locomotives are assigned as 9000 class by the Philippine National Railways.

== PNR 9000 class ==
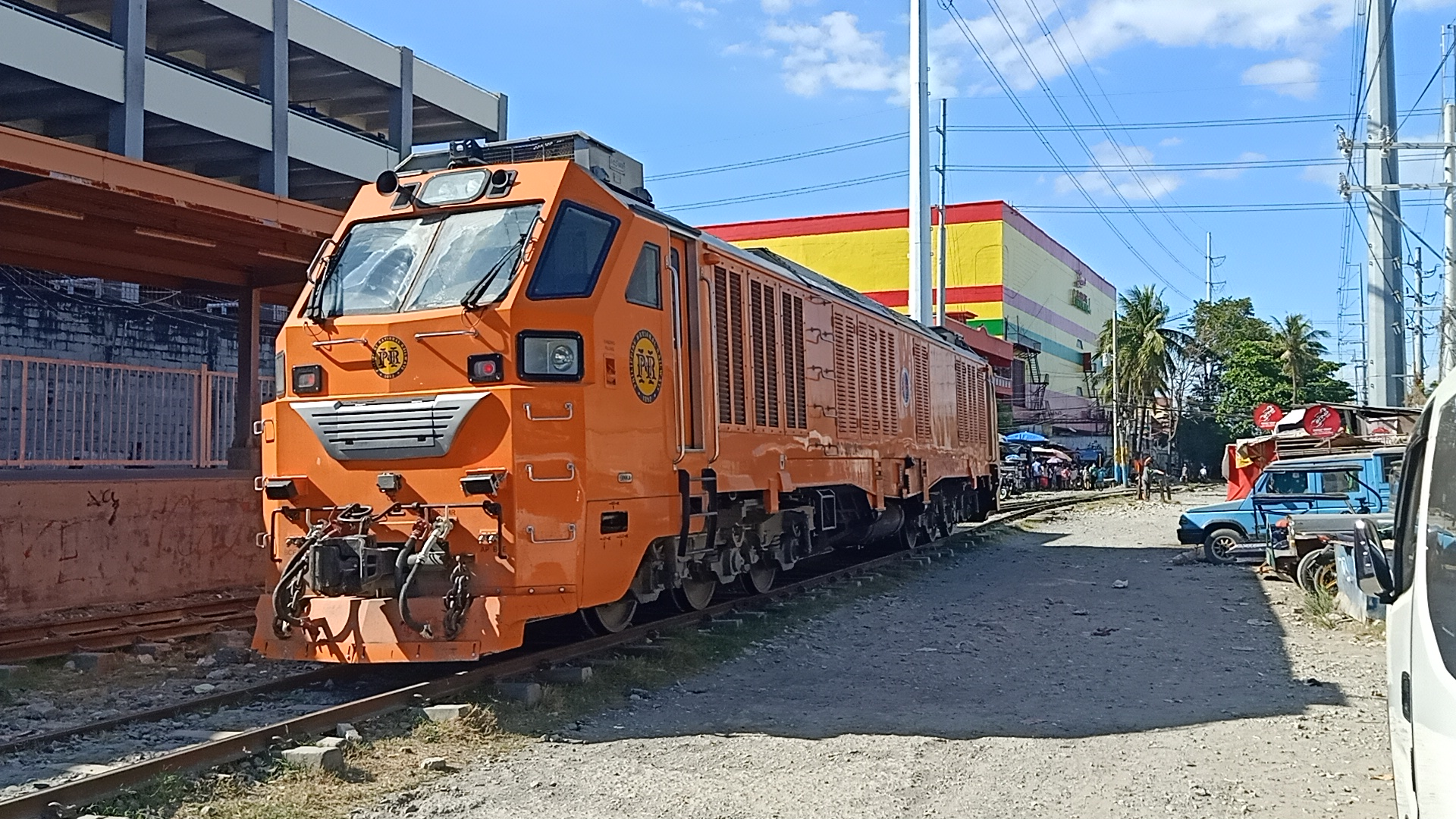
A PNR 9000 class at Alabang Station in March 2022.

=== Purchase ===
During its launch, Purnomo said that PT INKA is looking forward to export the locomotive to other countries in need of flood-resistant locomotives. On 28 May 2018, the company signed a contract worth ₱1.4 billion (US$26 million) to supply the Philippine National Railways with three brand-new INKA CC300 locomotives and 15 coaches for use in re-fleeting its commuter service in Metro Manila. The locomotives were built in PT INKA's Madiun plant and underwent testing in KAI's railway lines before it was delivered to the Philippines on 23 December 2020. This export follows PT INKA's previous export to the PNR of two sets of 8000 class Diesel Multiple Units in December 2019 worth 130 billion rupiah (US$9.7 million) and four sets of 8100 class Diesel Multiple Units in February 2020 worth 301 billion rupiah (US$21.4 million).

=== Design ===
Unlike the first CC300s of Indonesia (CC300 12 01 - CC300 12 03), but same design as the other 2 Indonesian CC300s (CC300 14 01 & CC300 14 02), the locomotives have four windshields instead of two. The locomotives feature the Philippine National Railways logo at the side of the cab doors and in the front cabs, and the Department of Transportation located in the middle. The locomotives are painted orange.

=== Operations ===
On 28 January 2021, the 9000 class locomotives and the 8300 class coaches were inaugurated at Dela Rosa Station. Its inauguration was performed by DHL 9002 and 8303. These locomotives hauls the 8300 coaches and initially served the PNR Metro South Commuter. During 13 July 2021, the INKA CC300 locomotive reached Laguna for the first time. It was performed by DHL 9003 and 8302. Subsequently, the trains went to San Pablo for the opening of the San Pablo–Lucena inter-provincial commuter service, although the trains were returned to Manila on February 15. On April 7, 2022, an INKA CC300 and 8300 class coach was used as a sleeper train to Calamba for the first time. It was performed by DHL 9003 and passenger set 8301. On June 25, 2022, DHL 9001 and 9003 along with INKA 8300 class set 8302 and 8303 are used on the inauguration of the Inter-Provincial Commuter line. DHL 9003 and 8302 went home to Tutuban to serve the MSC line a day later, although the aforementioned unit returned to Lucena after the train service was extended to Calamba on October 6.

On July 17, 2023, DHL 9003 and 8303 went to Ligao station for a test run from Camarines Sur to Ligao in Albay. 9003 is the first CC300 locomotive in the Philippines to reach Bicol Region. The locomotive served the Naga–Ligao route of the PNR's Bicol Commuter.

On 22 October 2024, rains brought by Tropical Storm Trami (2024) (local name Kristine), which registered as high as 578.9 mm in just one day, causing the PNR Naga depot to be flooded affecting INKA DHL 9003, a PNR 8000 class unit, a KiHa 52 rescue train, KiHa 35, KiHa 59 series, a PNR 2500 class locomotive, and a PNR 5000 class locomotive. INKA DHL 9002 was in Legazpi City and was not affected by the flood and served Naga City–Sipocot, On February 14, 2025, INKA DHL 9002 started its trial run on the Naga–Legazpi route, after INKA DHL 9002 returned to Naga–Legazpi from Naga City–Sipocot line after the repairs of INKA DMU PNR 8000 class 8002 trainset. Eventually the Naga–Legazpi service resumed on February 26 after the rehabilitation of trainsets due to flooding on Naga station last October 2024, but its trips were reduced from 6 trips to 2 trips a day due to 1 remaining trainset awaiting spare parts from Indonesia.
