= PNR 2500 class =

Diesel-electric locomotives used by Philippine National Railways

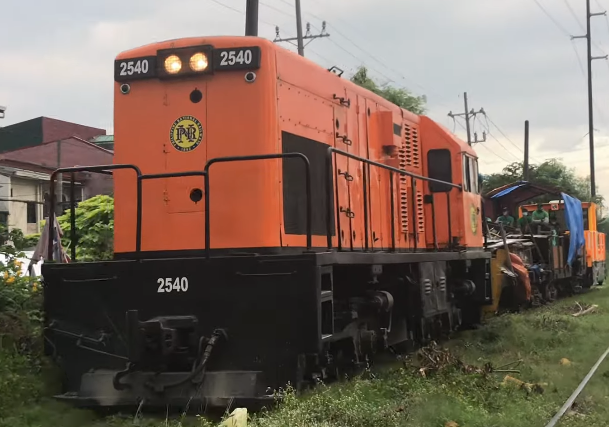
- DEL 2540 carrying a rail maintenance with the new SVI switcher in January 2021. 2540 was the first unit wearing the Orange livery.
Type and origin
- Power type: Diesel-electric
- Builder: GE Transportation
- Serial number: 35674-35686; 40742-40751; 40901-40910; 41838-41847
- Model: GE U10B
- Build date: 1965 (2501-2513); 1976 (2514-2523, 2524-2533); 1979 (2534-2543)
- Total produced: 43
Specifications
- Configuration
  - AAR: B-B
  - UIC: Bo-Bo
- Gauge: 1,067 mm (3 ft 6 in)
- Wheel diameter: 39 in (1,000 mm)
- Minimum curve: 57 degrees
- Wheelbase: 2.18 m (7 ft 2 in) per bogie
- Length: 11 m (37 ft)
- Width: 2.7 m (9 ft)
- Height: 3.7 m (12 ft)
- Loco weight: 50 t (110,000 lb)
- Fuel type: Fuel oil
- Prime mover: Caterpillar D398
- Engine type: Diesel engine
- Alternator: GE GMD-175
- Generator: Main: GE-GT601; Auxiliary: GE GY27
- Traction motors: 4 × GE 761
- Cylinders: 12
- Transmission: Electrical
- Gear ratio: 93:18
- Loco brake: Dynamic and air
Performance figures
- Maximum speed: 103 km/h (64 mph)
- Power output: 1,050 hp (780 kW)
- Tractive effort
  - Starting: 104 kN (23,300 lbf) at 30%
  - Continuous: 150 kN (33,000 lbf) at 48 km/h (30 mph)
Career
- Operators: Philippine National Railways
- Class: 2500 class
- Number in class: 43
- Numbers: 2501–2543
- Locale: Manila; Naga
- Delivered: December 1965 (2501-2502); January to March 1966 (2503-2513); April 1976 (2514-2523); May 1976 (2524-2533); June 1979 (2534-2543)
- First run: 1965
- Disposition: 1 active, 2 inactive, 40 scrapped

The PNR 2500 class is a class of 43 GE U10B Diesel Electric Locomotives first introduced in 1965 with the delivery of the first 13 locomotives of the class. The locomotives were previously used for long haul services in the PNR North Main Line and the PNR South Main Line.

== Build numbers ==
The following are the build numbers of the PNR 2500 class.

Locomotive Number	Build Number	Year	References
2501	35674	1965	
2502	35675	1965	
2503	35676	1966	
2504	35677	1966	
2505	35678	1966	
2506	35679	1966	
2507	35680	1966	
2508	35681	1966	
2509	35682	1966	
2510	35683	1966	
2511	35684	1966	
2512	35685	1966	
2513	35686	1966	
2514	40742	1976	
2515	40743	1976	
2516	40744	1976	
2517	40745	1976	
2518	40746	1976	
2519	40747	1976	
2520	40748	1976	
2521	40749	1976	
2522	40750	1976	
2523	40751	1976	
2524	40901	1976	
2525	40902	1976	
2526	40903	1976	
2527	40904	1976	
2528	40905	1976	
2529	40906	1976	
2530	40907	1976	
2531	40908	1976	
2532	40909	1976	
2533	40910	1976	
2534	41838	1979	
2535	41839	1979	
2536	41840	1979	
2537	41841	1979	
2538	41842	1979	
2539	41843	1979	
2540	41844	1979	
2541	41845	1979	
2542	41846	1979	
2543	41847	1979	

== Status ==
As of May 2023, only one unit is active, 1 unit is transferred to Caloocan workshops after being used as a Bicol commuter hauler, one unit is beyond economical repair, and 40 units were scrapped.

Locomotive Number	Status	Notes
2501	Scrapped	
2502	Scrapped	
2503	Scrapped	
2504	Scrapped	
2505	Scrapped	
2506	Scrapped	
2507	Scrapped	Scrapped in the late-2000's.
2508	Scrapped	
2509	Scrapped	
2510	Scrapped	Scrapped in 2009.
2511	Scrapped	It had 2515's cowcatcher refitted on it.
2512	Scrapped	2512 was once used as a Christmas Train in 1974.
2513	Scrapped	
2514	Scrapped	
2515	Scrapped	2515 was scrapped In 2009. Had a text under its cowcatcher numbered "HC-30".
2516	Scrapped	
2517	Scrapped	
2518	Scrapped	2518 was scrapped in 2009. Had a text under its cowcatcher numbered "HC-29" when it was in red and green livery.
2519	Scrapped	
2520	Scrapped	
2521	Scrapped	
2522	Scrapped	2522 was a part of a failed rehabilitation project. Its cab was used by 5002 following a crane mishap in 1996.
2523	Scrapped	
2524	Scrapped	
2525	Scrapped	
2526	Scrapped	
2527	Scrapped	
2528	Scrapped	2528 was a part of a failed rehabilitation project. Scrapped in the mid to late-2000's.
2529	Scrapped	
2530	Scrapped	
2531	Scrapped	
2532	Scrapped	
2533	Scrapped	
2534	Scrapped	
2535	Inactive	2535 was declared Beyond Economical repair at Caloocan Workshops in 2016.
2536	Scrapped	Scrapped in the late-2000's.
2537	Scrapped	Scrap in the late-2000's.
2538	Inactive	2538 was transferred to Tutuban Yard. The last unit wearing the Blue II livery and is currently awaiting repairs.
2539	Scrapped	Scrapped in 2009.
2540	Active	2540 was repainted in Orange livery in 2021. 2540 currently serves as Legazpi Yard Shunter/Inspection Run.
2541	Scrapped	
2542	Scrapped	
2543	Scrapped	

== Parts acquisition ==
Parts for only 1 active locomotive are sourced from inactive locomotives as new parts for the U10B are not available.

== Gallery ==
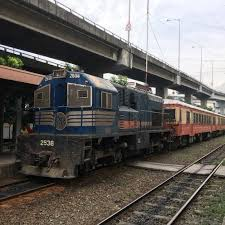
DEL 2538 Hauling Kiha 52 at Pasay Road Station

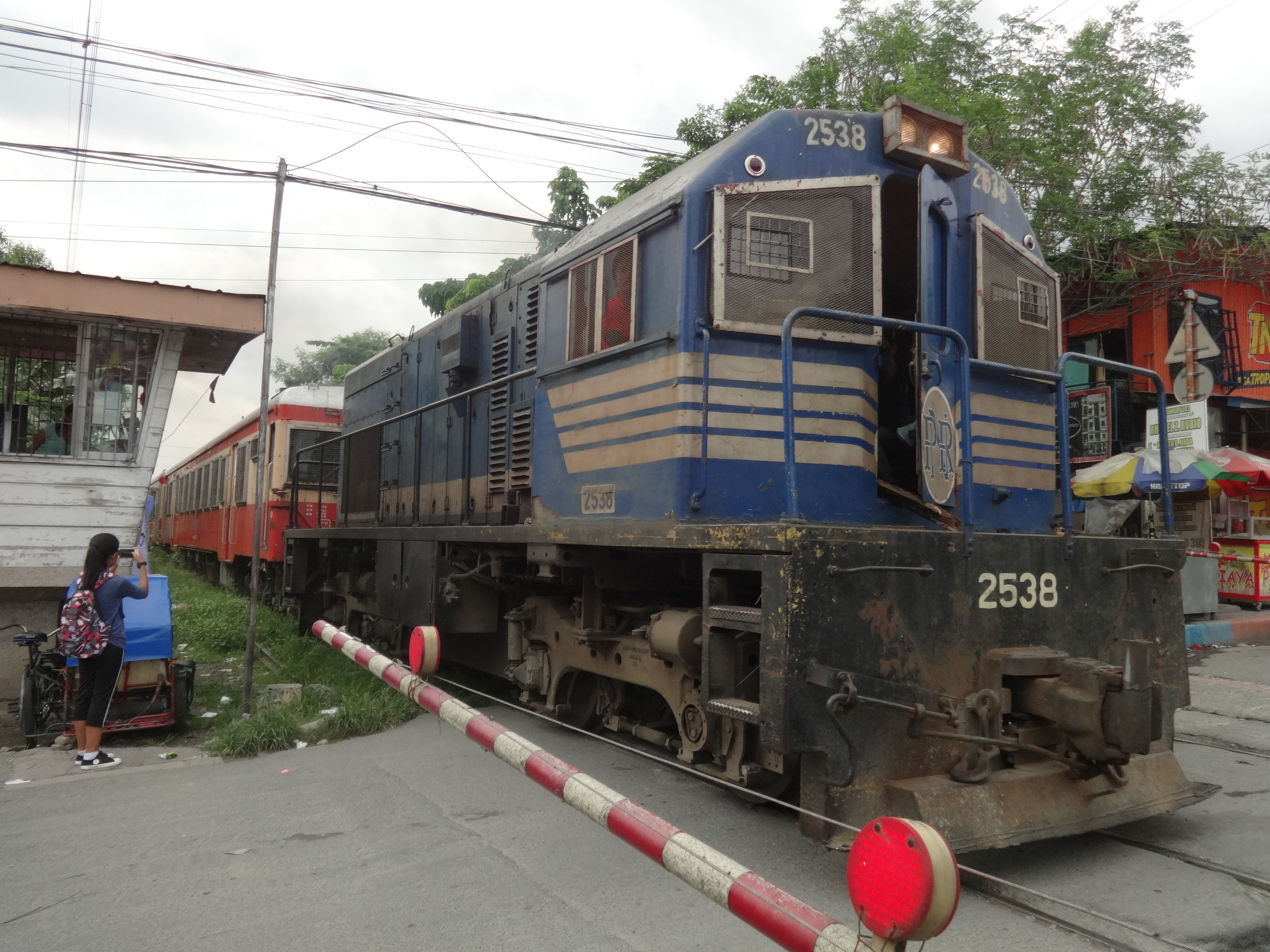
DEL 2538 hauling a Kiha 52 DMU at Santa Mesa, Maynila

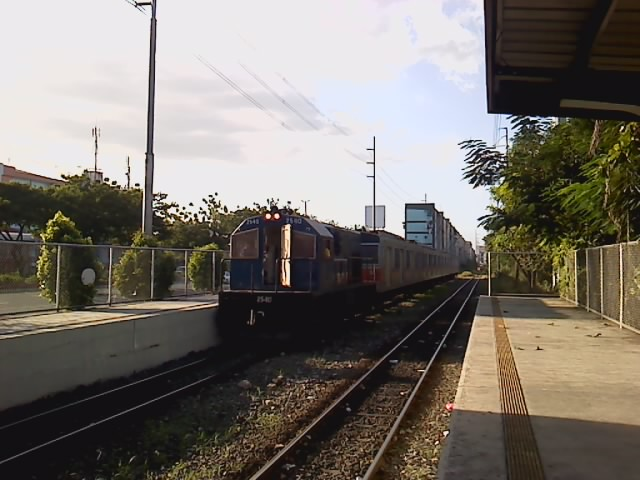
DEL 2540 hauling a 203 Series EMU at Vito Cruz station.

== See also ==
- PNR 900 Class
- PNR 5000 Class
- INKA CC300
