= PNR 5000 class =

Diesel-electric locomotives used by Philippine National Railways

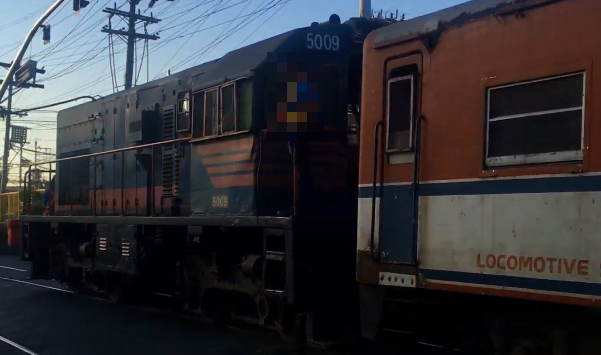
- DEL 5009 hauling CMC-201 rail maintenance coach in January 2020
Type and origin
- Power type: Diesel-electric
- Builder: GE Transportation
- Serial number: 4754.1–4754.10
- Model: GE U6B
- Build date: 1992
- Total produced: 10
Specifications
- Configuration
  - AAR: B-B
  - UIC: Bo-Bo
- Gauge: 1,067 mm (3 ft 6 in)
- Wheel diameter: 914 mm (36 in)
- Minimum curve: 57 degrees
- Wheelbase: 2.08 m (6 ft 10 in) per bogie
- Length: 11 m (37 ft)
- Width: 2.7 m (9 ft)
- Height: 3.7 m (12 ft)
- Axle load: 12.59 t (27,750 lb)
- Loco weight: 45 t (100,000 lb)
- Fuel type: Fuel oil
- Prime mover: Caterpillar D379
- RPM range: 640–1,200 rpm (10.7–20.0 Hz)
  - RPM idle: 640 rpm (10.7 Hz) (Note: Minimum)
  - Maximum RPM: 1,200 rpm (20 Hz)
- Engine type: Diesel engine
- Alternator: GE GMG-146
- Generator: Main: GE GT751; Auxiliary: GE GY27
- Traction motors: 4 × GE 748
- Cylinders: 8
- Transmission: Electrical
- Gear ratio: 103:15
- Loco brake: Dynamic and air
Performance figures
- Maximum speed: 89 km/h (55 mph)
- Power output: 400 kW (540 hp)
- Tractive effort
  - Starting: 120 kN (27,000 lbf) at 30%
  - Continuous: 56 kN (12,500 lbf) at 32 km/h (20 mph)
Career
- Operators: Philippine National Railways
- Class: 5000 class
- Number in class: 10
- Numbers: 5001–5010
- Locale: Manila; Naga
- Delivered: 1992
- First run: 1992
- Restored: 2022-2023
- Disposition: 3 active; 7 inactive
- Key features are noted from these references.

The PNR 5000 class are diesel-electric locomotives acquired in 1992 by the Philippine National Railways.

== Operational history ==
The 5000 class locomotives were acquired in 1992 to haul dead-motor CMC diesel multiple units. These were eventually used to haul passenger coaches in the PNR Metro Commuter Line. As of February 2001, five of the 10 DEL-5000 locomotives procured using ODA loan funds were in service, whilst the remaining five were awaiting repairs.

Currently, none of the locomotives are active in revenue service, 5001 and 5007 is assigned as Tutuban Yard shunter, while 5009 is assigned as the Yard Shunter in Naga. Three units followed suit in being repainted into the orange livery with the 900 class and 2500 class locomotives.

== Specifications ==
The 5000 class locomotive has a length of 11 meters (37 ft), a width of 2.7 meters (9 ft), and a height of 3.7 meters (12 ft). It is powered by an 8-cylinder Caterpillar D379 engine, with an equipped GE GT751 main generator and GE GY27 auxiliary generator.

== Features ==
The 5000 class or the GE U6B units feature number signs when they arrived in 1992, which are also found on the last batch of the 900 Class which consists of the U15C units.

The shorthood side of the locomotives has its door on the middle of the driver's cab. Which is different from the 900 class where it has its door on its left side.

== Build numbers ==
The following are the serial numbers of the 5000 class.

Locomotive Number	Build Number	Place Built	References
5001	4754.1	Montreal, Canada	
5002	4754.2	Montreal, Canada	
5003	4754.3	Montreal, Canada	
5004	4754.4	Montreal, Canada	
5005	4754.5	Montreal, Canada	
5006	4754.6	Montreal, Canada	
5007	4754.7	Montreal, Canada	
5008	4754.8	Montreal, Canada	
5009	4754.9	Montreal, Canada	
5010	4754.10	Montreal, Canada	

== Status ==
As of September 2026, none are active in revenue service. Meanwhile, three units are operational, and seven units are inactive.

The three operational units serve as yard shunters for Tutuban and Naga railyard.

Locomotive Number	Status	Notes	Liveries
5001	Active	5001 currently serves as one of the Tutuban Yard Shunters along with 5007.	Orange Livery (since 2021)
5002	Inactive	5002’s original cab was replaced by the cab of a class 2500 loco. 5002 is currently at Tutuban Yard.	Blue Livery
5003	Inactive	5003 is currently awaiting repair at Tutuban yard. Some panels from her hood have already been repainted to orange.	Partial Orange (since 2022)
5004	Inactive	5004 is currently at Caloocan Yard. 5004 appeared in the movie called 'Extrang Hero' in 1997.	Blue Livery
5005	Inactive	5005 is currently awaiting repairs inside Caloocan Workshop.	Blue Livery
5006	Inactive	5006 is stored at Caloocan Workshop. 5006 is known for its appearance in the Music Video 'Para sa Masa' by Eraserheads in 1998.	Blue Livery
5007	Active	5007 currently serves as the Tutuban Yard Shunter. 5007 is the first out of the ten units to be repainted into the new livery.	2024 Orange Livery (since 2025)
5008	Inactive	5008 is currently at Tutuban Yard.	Blue Livery
5009	Active	5009 was previously a Bicol commuter hauler. She is currently an active shunter in Naga yard.	2024 Orange Livery
5010	Inactive	5010 is the last unit wearing the Red Livery. 5010 was declared Beyond Economical Repair (BER) and currently sits outside the main workshop, heavily stripped.	Red Livery

== Gallery ==
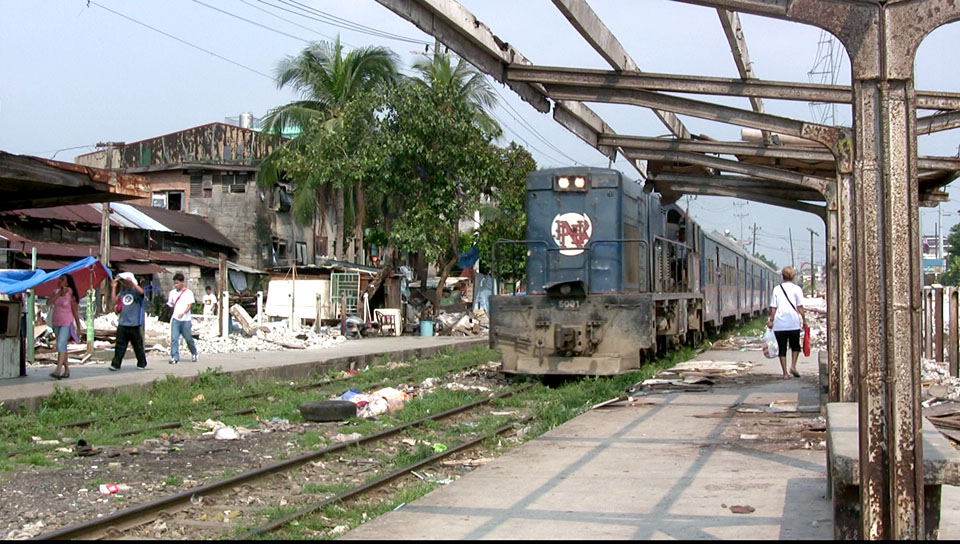
5001 in Blue livery.
