= List of Philippine National Railways rolling stock =

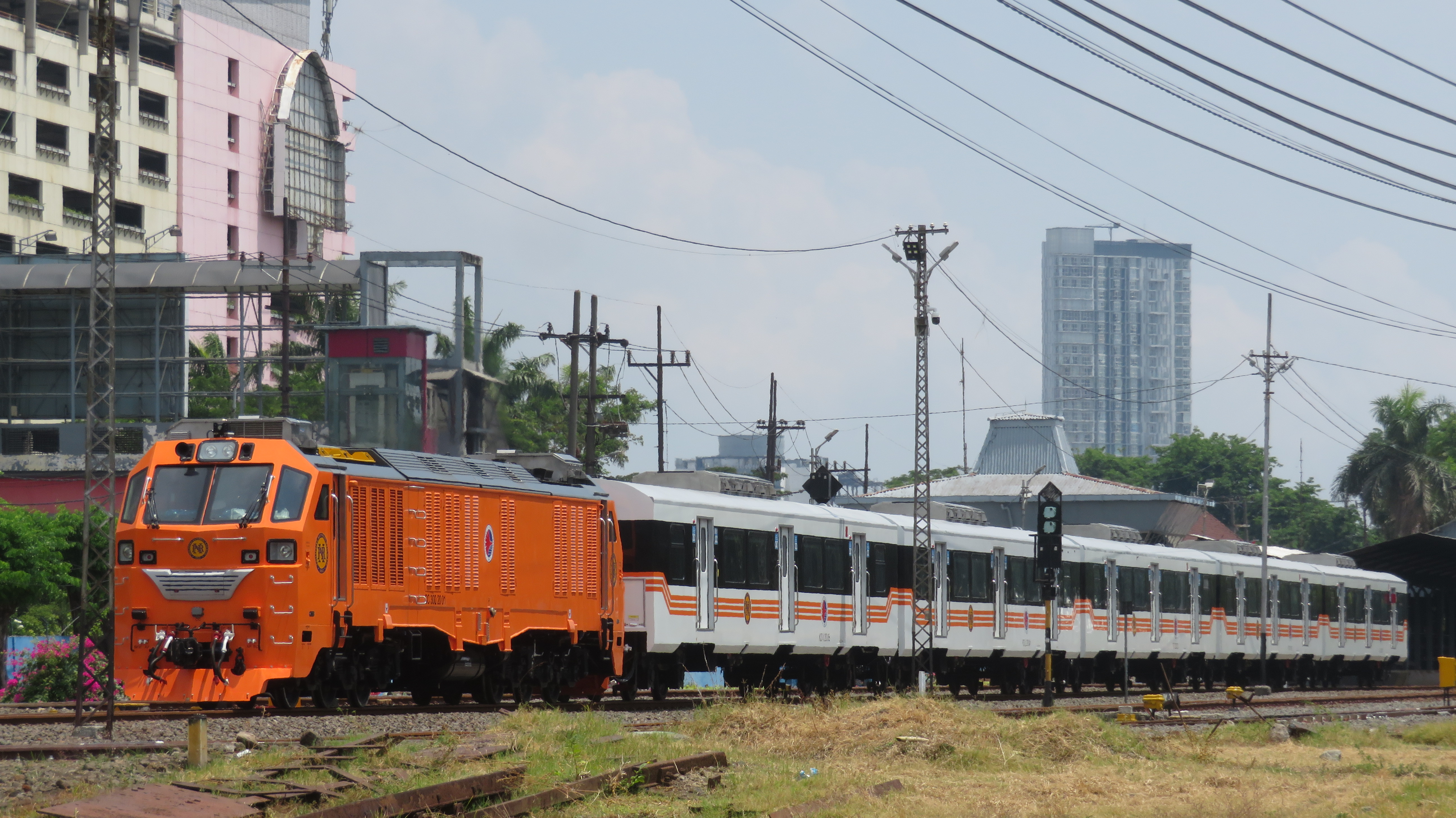
An INKA CC300 (PNR 9000 class) hauling 8300 class coaches both built by PT INKA on a test run in Indonesia. Currently, they are the latest rolling stock of the Philippine National Railways main line.

The Philippine National Railways and its predecessors such as the Manila Railroad Company have operated several types of locomotives, carriages and multiple units as part of its fleet. As of 2022, the rolling stock used are primarily powered by diesel. The DOST Hybrid Electric Train may also function as a battery electric multiple unit although it is started by a diesel engine. All present rolling stock are built to the 1,067 mm (3 ft 6 in) narrow gauge. PNR also has rail mounted cranes as supporting equipment with varying capacities from 0.5 to 30 tonnes (1,100 to 66,100 lb).

In late 2019, all trains in service except the 203 series-derived coaches underwent refurbishment and livery changes. The multiple units were given an orange and white color scheme and its windows were changed from having steel grills to polycarbonate windows that can resist stoning from illegal settlers while the locomotives have been painted orange.

In 2022, PNR introduced their first ever standard gauge EMU that will run through the North-South commuter rail or NSCR. The rolling stock are still unclassified.

== Active ==
Locomotives:
- DEL: Diesel-electric
- DHL: Diesel-hydraulic
- STE: Steam locomotive with tender
- ST: Tank locomotive
Railroad cars:
- B: Baggage car
- C: Coach
- HEP: Head end power car
- S: Sleeping car
Multiple units:
- BEMU: Battery electric multiple unit
- DMU: Diesel multiple unit
- EMU: Electric multiple unit

The following rolling stock are active with the PNR as of October 2026.

=== Locomotives ===
Class	Image	Type	Maximum speed		Number built	Number in service	Built date	Manufacturer	Gauge	Remarks
Class	Image	Type	mph	km/h	Number built	Number in service	Built date	Manufacturer	Gauge	Remarks
900		DEL	64	103	21	6	1973, 1979 & 1991	GE	1,067 mm (3 ft 6 in)	Originally a class of 21 units, 9 were scrapped, 4 were non operational, 1 unit being revived, and 7 units are operational. Most of the operational units sits idle at the Tutuban yard, awaiting transfers to the south. 917, the only class 900 unit in Bicol, is also the only unit that currently hauls intermittent passenger trains while 916, 918, and 922 leads miscellaneous trains from and to Caloocan.
2500		DEL	64	103	43	1	1965, 1966, 1976 & 1979	GE	1,067 mm (3 ft 6 in)	Originally a class of 43 units built between 1965 and 1979. All but 2535, 2538 and more except 2540 have been scrapped. DEL 2540, the last operational unit, is currently being used as a work train hauler between Lucena and Ragay.
5000		DEL	64	103	10	3	1992	GE	1,067 mm (3 ft 6 in)	Originally a class of 10 units, 5 were stored in Caloocan Workshop, 2 were stored in Tutuban yard, and 3 are operational. 5001 and 5007 are currently used as shunters in Manila, while 5009 is used as a shunter in Bicol.
9000		DHL	75	120	3	1	2020	PT INKA	1,067 mm (3 ft 6 in)	Philippine export variant of the INKA CC300. The latest locomotive of PNR. 9003 is currently the only operational unit, while 9001 was stored in Manila and 9002 was trapped in Legazpi. Both units have since been used as a source of spare parts for 9003.

=== Coaches ===
Class	Image	Type	Top speed		Number built	Number in service	Built	Acquired	Manufacturer	Gauge	Remarks
Class	Image	Type	mph	km/h	Number built	Number in service	Built	Acquired	Manufacturer	Gauge	Remarks
203 series coaches		HEP	60	100	40 units (8 sets)	25 units (5 sets)	1984–1986	2011	Kawasaki; Nippon Sharyo; Kinki Sharyo	1,067 mm (3 ft 6 in)	Former JR East rolling stock donated to the Philippines in 2011 and entered service in 2012. Converted from electric multiple units to locomotive-hauled coaches for push-pull service due to lack of electrification in the PNR system. 2 sets still retain the 2015 blue-orange livery and equipped with air conditioning systems from PT INKA, while the other 2 sets were under repainting for the new livery. All 5 active sets are fitted with polycarbonate windows. Originally 40 units, 15 units have been and currently inactive.
203 series coaches		C	60	100	40 units (8 sets)	25 units (5 sets)	1984–1986	2011	Kawasaki; Nippon Sharyo; Kinki Sharyo	1,067 mm (3 ft 6 in)	
8300		C	75	120	15 units (3 sets)	10 units (2 sets)	2019–2020	New	PT INKA	1,067 mm (3 ft 6 in)	PNR's latest loco-hauled train coaches since the arrival of the last 7A-100 class in 1978. Classified by trainset grouping instead of individual cars.

=== Multiple units ===
Class	Image	Type	Top speed		Number built	Number in service	Cars per set	Built	Acquired	Gauge	Remarks
Class	Image	Type	mph	km/h	Number built	Number in service	Cars per set	Built	Acquired	Gauge	Remarks
KiHa 350		DMU	59	95	6 units (3 sets)	2 units (1 set)	2	1962–66	2015	1,067 mm (3 ft 6 in)	Former Kantō Railway rolling stock. One set is used in Naga for the Bicol Commuter service, the other in storage in Caloocan as of 2024.
Hyundai Rotem		DMU	50	80	18 units (6 sets)	6 units (2 sets)	3	2009	New	1,067 mm (3 ft 6 in)	The first new order of the PNR since the 1970s. Originally 18 units until half of these were written off due to involvement in accidents. 2 sets were refurbished in 2019 and repainted in PT INKA livery.
8000		DMU	60	100	6 units (2 sets)	6 units (2 sets)	3	2018–2019	New	1,067 mm (3 ft 6 in)	These units are derived from the Indonesian EA203 Airport Express EMUs. The two classes may be distinguished by their 3-car (8000 class) and 4-car (8100 class) formation. The 8000 class service the Metro North Commuter and Inter-Provincial Commuter while the 8100 class service the Metro South Commuter.
8100		DMU	60	100	16 units (4 sets)	12 units (3 sets)	4	2019–2020	New	1,067 mm (3 ft 6 in)	These units are derived from the Indonesian EA203 Airport Express EMUs. The two classes may be distinguished by their 3-car (8000 class) and 4-car (8100 class) formation. The 8000 class service the Metro North Commuter and Inter-Provincial Commuter while the 8100 class service the Metro South Commuter.

== Future ==
Locomotives:

- DEL: Diesel-electric
- DHL: Diesel-hydraulic
- STE: Steam locomotive with tender
- ST: Tank locomotive

Railroad cars:

- B: Baggage car
- C: Coach
- HEP: Head end power car
- S: Sleeping car

Multiple units:

- BEMU: Battery electric multiple unit
- DMU: Diesel multiple unit
- EMU: Electric multiple unit

=== Locomotives ===
Class	Image	Type	Maximum speed		Units	Built	Manufacturer	Gauge	Remarks
Class	Image	Type	mph	km/h	Units	Built	Manufacturer	Gauge	Remarks
HXN		DEL	75	120	4	TBD	CRRC	1,435 mm (4 ft 8 1/2 in)	Based on the FXN3C Fuxing locomotive, which in turn is based on the China Railway HXN3. To be used on the PNR South Long Haul's freight services.

=== Multiple units ===
Class	Image	Type	Maximum speed		Units	Cars per set	Built	Manufacturer	Gauge	Remarks
Class	Image	Type	mph	km/h	Units	Cars per set	Built	Manufacturer	Gauge	Remarks
HET		DMU/BEMU	50	80	TBD	5	TBD	DOST	1,067 mm (3 ft 6 in)	The first Filipino-made train with imported components. One set was completed. It was last active December 2025 on a transfer run from Calamba Shops in Calamba, Laguna to the siding at the International Rice Research Institute (IRRI) on the South Main Line in Los Baños, Laguna following Calamba's closure to support construction of the North–South Commuter Railway.
NSCR Commuter EMU		EMU	75	120	104	8	2021–ongoing	J-TREC	1,435 mm (4 ft 8 1/2 in)	PNR's EM10000 class are the agency's first electric multiple units. Set to enter service by 2023.
NSCR Commuter EMU		EMU	75	120	304	8	2021–ongoing	J-TREC	1,435 mm (4 ft 8 1/2 in)	An additional 304 railcars were ordered from J-TREC for NSCR North Phase 2 and NSCR South. This is in addition to the 104 EM10000 cars that were already ordered.
D8800		DMU	100	160	6	3	2019–21	CRRC Zhuzhou	1,435 mm (4 ft 8 1/2 in)	Originally an order of 21 sets (63 cars) for the PNR South Long Haul project, with an initial delivery of 3 sets (9 cars) until it was cancelled altogether in January 2020. Despite this, 2 sets were already built and are stored in China as of July 2022.
South Long Haul DMU		DMU	100	160	72	8	c. 2022–23	TBD	1,435 mm (4 ft 8 1/2 in)	Originally an order of 64 diesel multiple unit cars were to be ordered as part of Contract Package 5 (CP5). It was later increased to 72 cars, equivalent to 9 eight-car sets.
NSCR Airport Express train		EMU	100	160	56	8	c. 2028	CAF; Mitsubishi	1,435 mm (4 ft 8 1/2 in)	To be used on airport limited express services on the NSCR. Design based on the El Insurgente rolling stock.

== Retired ==
As one of the oldest rail operators in Asia, the Philippine National Railways and its predecessors, the Manila Railway and Manila Railroad companies, had a diverse collection of steam and diesel locomotives, passenger railcars, gasoline, and diesel multiple units. All but three tank locomotives from the Manila Railway were scrapped.

Locomotives:
- DEL: Diesel-electric
- DHL: Diesel-hydraulic
- STE: Steam locomotive with tender
- ST: Tank locomotive
Railroad cars:
- B: Baggage car
- C: Coach
- HEP: Head end power car
- S: Sleeping car
Multiple units:
- BEMU: Battery electric multiple unit
- DMU: Diesel multiple unit
- EMU: Electric multiple unit

=== Former locomotives ===
According to a 1952 publication, the Second World War destroyed 120 locomotives belonging to the Manila Railroad (MRR), more than 75% of its fleet.

Class	Image	Type	Top speed		Units	Built	Wheel class	Manufacturer	Gauge	Remarks
Class	Image	Type	mph	km/h	Units	Built	Wheel class	Manufacturer	Gauge	Remarks
Manila Railway
Manila		ST	20	33	1885–86	5	0-4-0T	Hunslet	1,067 mm (3 ft 6 in)	The first steam locomotives in the country, it was used for the steam-powered Manila Tranvias and later on mainline services on the Manila–Dagupan line. Manila was transferred to Bamban Sugar Central until it was withdrawn c. 1991 and given to Hozugawa Live Steam Club in Japan.
Dagupan		ST	20	33	1888–90	30	2-4-2T & 0-6-2T	Neilson; Dübs	1,067 mm (3 ft 6 in)	The last four units were divided into the A and B subclasses in the 1940s. The only survivor of the class is No. 17 Urdaneta, now on display in an open-air museum in Dagupan.
V		ST	20	33	1905	2	0-6-0T	Kerr Stuart	1,067 mm (3 ft 6 in)	Also known as Cabanatuan class. No. 777 Cabanatuan survives and on display in Tutuban. Meanwhile, No. 778 Batangas was scrapped after 1952.
70		ST	30	48	1906	25	0-6-2T	NBL	1,067 mm (3 ft 6 in)	Only 6 units survived by 1952, all of which were scrapped. No. 79 survived with PASUDECO as 0-6-2TT until 1989, and was reported to have survived until 2006.
100		STE	30	48	1906	5	4-4-2	NBL	1,067 mm (3 ft 6 in)	The first tender locomotive in Philippine service. Shelved in 1929 and scrapped before 1952.
W		ST	30	48	1907	4	0-6-0ST	Kerr Stuart	1,067 mm (3 ft 6 in)	Named San Fernando, Magdalena, Bauan and Santa Cruz
X		ST	30	48	1907	8	0-6-0ST	Kerr Stuart	1,067 mm (3 ft 6 in)	Also referred as the Cavite class. No. 1007 Cavite was rebuilt as Dagupan, and is the only survivor of this class. It is currently on display in front of Tutuban station although it was decommissioned before 1952. Two more units that were still in service by 1952 were scrapped afterwards.
D/37		STE			1907	8	4-6-0	Kerr Stuart	1,067 mm (3 ft 6 in)	
120		ST	30	48	1909–10	6	4-6-2T	NBL	1,067 mm (3 ft 6 in)	No. 125 was the only surviving member by 1952 and was scrapped afterwards.
110		STE	40	64	1912	4	4-6-0	ALCO Rogers	1,067 mm (3 ft 6 in)	The two classes were the first high-pressure steam locomotives in Philippine service. The 110s were used for passenger trains while the 130s for freight. None of the units were active by 1952.
130		STE	40	64	1912	4	2-8-0	ALCO Rogers	1,067 mm (3 ft 6 in)	The two classes were the first high-pressure steam locomotives in Philippine service. The 110s were used for passenger trains while the 130s for freight. None of the units were active by 1952.
160		ST	10	16	1913-14	4	2-6-0+0-6-2T	Kitson	1,067 mm (3 ft 6 in)	These tank engines were the first class of Meyer locomotives in Asia and the only examples in the Far East. All four were retired in 1925.
300		ST	20	32	1914	6	0-8-0T	SLM; Esslingen		Also known as R class, it was the only cog locomotive class in Philippine service. All units were either destroyed during World War II or in the case of No. 306 Mirador, scrapped immediately after the war in 1945.
127		ST	30	48	1914	2	4-6-4T	NBL		Originally ordered with 7 160 class locomotives. Sold to Canlubang Sugar Estate in 1946.
Manila Railroad
45		STE	53	85	1919–21	21	4-6-0	Porter	1,067 mm (3 ft 6 in)	MRR built the 21st locomotive (No. 65) using parts from the existing fleet in 1932. Eight units survived by 1952, and the last unit (No. 62) was scrapped c. 1990.
170		STE	53	85	1921	10	4-8-2	ALCO	1,067 mm (3 ft 6 in)	Three units survived World War II (Nos. 171, 176 and 180). No. 176 was scrapped in Tutuban in 1968.
200		STE	53	85	1921	10	2-10-2	ALCO	1,067 mm (3 ft 6 in)	Manila Railroad's most powerful units. Four units have survived by 1952. No. 206 was the last locomotive in active service by 1960 and was scrapped later that decade.
140		STE	53	85	1926–29	10	4-6-2	Baldwin	1,067 mm (3 ft 6 in)	Two units survived after World War II, Nos. 148 and 149. No. 148 was decommissioned and scrapped before 1952 while No. 149 was still in service by 1952 and scrapped afterwards.
250		STE	53	85	1928–29	10	2-8-2	Baldwin	1,067 mm (3 ft 6 in)	Designed on the same platform as the 140 class with interchangeable parts, similar to the interchangeability between the 170 and 200 classes. Nos. 253 and 256 survived World War II but were decommissioned in 1949 and scrapped later on.
800		STE	53	85	1944	45	2-8-2	Vulcan; ALCO	1,067 mm (3 ft 6 in)	Also known as USA class and were built for the United States Army. Three units were named: No. 865 Huckleberry Finn, No. 866 Tom Sawyer, and No. 867 Hanibella. The locomotives also featured the first usage of the Janney coupler compared to the buffers and chain coupler used on older locomotives. Decommissioned c. 1956 then scrapped later on.
8500		DEL	53	85	1944	8	Bo-Bo	GE	1,067 mm (3 ft 6 in)	MRR's first diesel-powered and GE-built locomotives. Units 8584–89 were sold to Japan in 1946 and unit 8589 were returned to the Philippines in 1966. Nos. 8790 and 8791 continued in Philippine service until it served Panay Railways until their scrapping by around 1990.
630		STE	53	85	1948	2	2-8-2	WAA; MRR	1,067 mm (3 ft 6 in)	Ordered from the U.S. War Assets Administration and were assembled locally by the Manila Railroad in its facility in Caloocan. Decommissioned c. 1956 then scrapped later on.
100		STE	53	85	1949	7	4-8-2	Vulcan	1,067 mm (3 ft 6 in)	Decommissioned c. 1956 then scrapped later on.
300		STE	53	85	1951	10	2-8-2	Nippon	1,067 mm (3 ft 6 in)	Decommissioned c. 1956 then scrapped later on.
1000		DEL	64	103	1955–56	10	C–C	GE	1,067 mm (3 ft 6 in)	Nicknamed the Streamliner units. Scrapped.
2000		DEL	64	103	1955–56	20	C–C	GE	1,067 mm (3 ft 6 in)	Nicknamed the Shovelnose units and featured an early example of the cowl unit. Last unit decommissioned in January 1999 and then scrapped in 2000.
3000; 4000		DEL	43	70	1955–56	10	B–B	GE	1,067 mm (3 ft 6 in)	Later renumbered as 4000 class, four units were transferred to Panay Railways. Although initially reported that all 10 units were scrapped prior to 2019, No. 4010 still survives as Locomotive No. 41 of the Victorias Milling Company albeit already retired from service.
3500		DHL	43	70	1963	4	B–B	Nippon	1,067 mm (3 ft 6 in)	Transferred to Panay Railways in the 1980s with the last two units scrapped in 2017.
Philippine National Railways									1,067 mm (3 ft 6 in)	
1500		DEL	56	90	1966–67	10	B-B-B	Alsthom	1,067 mm (3 ft 6 in)	Based from Althom's B-B-B Electric Locomotives along with Myanmar Railways' DF1200 class of 1958. Retired in 1976 after being involved in a runaway train incident. The last unit was being scrapped in Caloocan while appearing on the 1988 film Gawa Na ang Balang Papatay sa 'Yo".

=== Former coaches ===
Does not include freight stock since there is little documentation about their classification and numbers.

Class	Image	Type	Top speed		Units	Built	Acquired	Manufacturer	Gauge	Remarks
Class	Image	Type	mph	km/h	Units	Built	Acquired	Manufacturer	Gauge	Remarks
Manila Railway
MDRR Primera		C	20	32	6	c. 1887–92	New	Metropolitan	1,067 mm (3 ft 6 in)	Used a corridor coach configuration with 3 compartments accommodating 8 passengers each.
MDRR Segunda		C	20	32	11	c. 1888–92	New	Metropolitan	1,067 mm (3 ft 6 in)	Used a corridor coach configuration with 3 compartments accommodating 8 passengers each.
Private Car		C	20	32	1	c. 1892	New	Metropolitan	1,067 mm (3 ft 6 in)	A slightly longer variant of the existing fleet, it was Horace Higgins' private car during his tenure as general manager. Replaced by the ABB-1 in 1914.
Boxcar		C	20	32		1890	New	Unknown, UK	1,067 mm (3 ft 6 in)	Repurposed boxcars were initially used as third-class accommodations as reported in 1904.
Tercera Clase		C	32	50	60	c. 1904	New	Metropolitan	1,067 mm (3 ft 6 in)	Replaced third-class boxcars.
AB (I)		C	32	50		1900	New		1,067 mm (3 ft 6 in)	Also known as Ferrocarril cars, these were the first American rolling stock to be used in the country and they were recognized by the use of clerestory roofs.
AB 200		C	32	50	15	c. 1906	New		1,067 mm (3 ft 6 in)	
CB		C	32	50	c. 20	1906	New	Harlan	1,067 mm (3 ft 6 in)	
CB 200		C	32	50	25	1906	New	Jackson	1,067 mm (3 ft 6 in)	
ABB		C	40	64	2	1913	New	Metropolitan	1,067 mm (3 ft 6 in)	Stands for AB Business car (i.e. AB-series first class business car). ABB-1 was Douglas MacArthur's personal car. It was also used as the presidential railcar from 1935 to 1978. ABB-1 was scrapped by the mid-1980s.
Metropolitan		C	40	64	24	1913	New	Metropolitan	1,067 mm (3 ft 6 in)	Unknown class due to lack of documentation. Third class coaches including 52 ft (16 m) and 65 ft (20 m) variants, as well as buffet cars.
ABS		C	40	64	1	1913	New	Metropolitan	1,067 mm (3 ft 6 in)	Sleeper car variant of the Metropolitan-type coaches.
Manila Railroad
VCB		C	48	75	57	1920-29	New	ACF; MRR	1,067 mm (3 ft 6 in)	These 6-axle third-class cars were the first trains to be assembled in the Manila Railroad's Caloocan workshops. One unit survived in Caloocan as a dormitory car as of March 2020 according to a local railfan group.
ABS (II)		C	48	75	2	1922–23	New	Metropolitan; MRR	1,067 mm (3 ft 6 in)	Two first-class sleeping cars built for the Baguio Night Special and subsequently, the Baguio Night Express.
AC		C	48	75	7	1924–26	New	ACF; MRR	1,067 mm (3 ft 6 in)	These are Combination coaches used for first and third class accommodations, with baggage room was constructed under the new "Passenger Baggage Coach" classification.
AB		C	48	75	11	1926–28	New	ACF; MRR	1,067 mm (3 ft 6 in)	6 were ordered on October 23, 1926 while another 5 were ordered in 1928.
ABS (1929)		C	40	64	1	1929	New	ACF; MRR	1,067 mm (3 ft 6 in)	Another first-class sleeping car for the Baguio Night Express.
MCTC		C	48	75	100	1929–41	New	MRR; Ramcar, Inc.	1,067 mm (3 ft 6 in)	Acronym for Motor Car Trailing Coaches. Built as trailer cars for the Rail Motor Car (RMC) class gasoline-powered multiple units.
1930s coaches		C	48	75	At least 5	c. 1929–37	New	Unknown	1,067 mm (3 ft 6 in)	The Manila Railroad reported a net increase of 5 passenger cars between 1929 and 1937.
7A		C	59	95	9	1948–58	New	Nippon; Kinki	1,067 mm (3 ft 6 in)	Class of at least 2 airconditioned first-class coaches, and were ordered from some Japanese suppliers. An additional four were ordered by recommendation of American consultants. However, according to Japanese magazine, 5 coaches were assembled by MRR in 1958 using Kinki's parts and underframes.
7C		C	59	95	63	1948–61	New	Pullman; Kinki; Niigata; Astra Arad; Hitachi; Alna Koki	1,067 mm (3 ft 6 in)	Replaced refurbished wooden 6-series cars of the MRR. Includes the 7C-00 of 1948, 7C-40 of 1956, and 7C-200 of 1958. Other 7C units were used as division dormitory cars while others have been converted to baggage/power cars. 6 units are still intact as of January 2024 namely 7C 45, 105, 113, 114, 115, and 204 (RDO).
7B		B	59	95	10	1950	New	Unknown, Japan	1,067 mm (3 ft 6 in)	The first class of all-steel baggage cars by 1952. All units were presumed to have been scrapped.
7BM		B	59	95	4+	1952–55	New	Kinki Sharyo	1,067 mm (3 ft 6 in)	Acronym for Baggage and Mail car. 7BM-4 was scrapped in the late 2000s.
7S		S	59	95	3	1958	New	Kinki Sharyo	1,067 mm (3 ft 6 in)	Decommissioned in the 90's, was last seen wearinv the metrotren "sleeper" livery.
7K		C	70	110	5	1960	New	Hitachi	1,067 mm (3 ft 6 in)	A class of 5 restaurant cars for both first- and third-class accommodations. The most notable car is PC-777, most popularly known as Ferdinand Marcos' presidential railcar, in which after its decommissioning in 1986 was renumbered PC-286. This unit is still stored in Caloocan as of January 2024.
Philippine National Railways
Class	Image	Type	Top speed		Units	Built	Acquired	Manufacturer	Gauge	Remarks
Class	Image	Type	mph	km/h	Units	Built	Acquired	Manufacturer	Gauge	Remarks
7B-40		B	60	100	2	1965–68	2011	Kawasaki; Kisha Seizo; Hitachi	1,067 mm (3 ft 6 in)	Second-hand WaKi 10000 boxcars for baggage acquired from JR East. Both units are intact as of 2021.
14		S	70	110	10	1966–79	2011	Nippon Sharyo; Fuji Heavy Industries; Niigata	1,067 mm (3 ft 6 in)	It was acquired for the fifth Bicol Express then stored until it was briefly used in 2020. 2 SuHaNe 14-700 couchette cars, 3 regular OHaNe 14-00 sleeper cars and 1 SuHaNeFu sleeper-generator car are now stored at the sidings of Calamba station in Laguna as of December 2022.
7A-100		C	70	110	32	1967–79	New	Kawasaki; Nippon Sharyo; Kinki Sharyo; Teikoku Sharyo; Tokyu Car; Astra Arad; MRR	1,067 mm (3 ft 6 in)	Based on JNR's 20 series passenger cars, they replaced the original 7A series cars (the original ones became "Tourist class coach"). Most of the cars had air conditioning and named DE LUXE. Since demoted to 7C in 2004 and were eventually scrapped.
7BP		B	70	110	7	1968–69	New	Hitachi	1,067 mm (3 ft 6 in)	Ordered in 1968. Stripped of motive power by 2004. A unit presumed to be 7BP-7 is stored in Caloocan as of January 2024.
7A-2000		C	70	110	30	1970–77	1999–2001	JNR; Fuji	1,067 mm (3 ft 6 in)	Replaced the CMC coaches and served as a commuter train until 2012.
NR		C	70	110	12	1970–77	2004	JNR; Fuji	1,067 mm (3 ft 6 in)	Acquired initially for the planned revitalization of the North Main Line services but then transferred to Bicol Express. Three converted to CAR class, the rest stored as dormitory cars or donated to charity. One coach being used as a clinic is proposed for demolition.
CAR		C	70	110	5	1970–77	2004; 2009	JNR; Fuji	1,067 mm (3 ft 6 in)	Reclassified from old 7A-2000 and NR-class. Three units are in Calamba while the other 2 are in Caloocan.
TA		C	70	110	12	1973	New	Kinki	1,067 mm (3 ft 6 in)	Intermediate cars of the MCBP trainsets. TA-5, the last surviving member of the class, could be found inside the Caloocan Workshops together with IC-888.
CTC-100		C	59	95	30+	1974	New	Tokyu Car	1,067 mm (3 ft 6 in)	Trailer cars for the Commuter Motor Coach (CMC) class diesel multiple units. Only CTC-174 remains as of 2019.
7E		B, C	87	140	30 (C only)	1975–79	New	ICF	1,067 mm (3 ft 6 in)	Export version of the ICF coach and was known as the Madras coach. Decommissioned c. early 2000s, Last 2 units scrapped in the late-2000s.
7SE		B, C	87	140	2	1975–79	New	ICF	1,067 mm (3 ft 6 in)	Export version of the ICF coach and was known as the Madras coach. Decommissioned c. early 2000s, Last 2 units scrapped in the late-2000s.

=== Former railmotors and multiple units ===
Class	Image	Type	Top speed		Units	Built	Manufacturer	Gauge	Remarks
Class	Image	Type	mph	km/h	Units	Built	Manufacturer	Gauge	Remarks
Manila Railroad
RMC		RM, DMU	40	64	200+	1929–41	MRR; Ramcar	1,067 mm (3 ft 6 in)	Produced domestically, it was the first multiple unit trainset in Philippine service, as well as the first to adopt the use of Janney couplers. They were originally powered by gasoline, until the fuel was switched to diesel after an accident in 1940, becoming the first ever DMUs operated by a Southeast Asian national railway company (the Nederlandsch-Indische Spoorweg Maatschappij long distance DMU, which was supposed to be the first ever in Southeast Asia, never came to Indonesia due to the Second World War.) These DMUs were rebuilt starting in 1948 and with an unknown decommissioning and scrap date.
JMC		DMU	59	95	20	1955	Mitsubishi; Tokyu Car	1,067 mm (3 ft 6 in)	It was subdivided into JMC-300 motor cars and JTC-100 trailer cars. Two cars were named and rehabilitated in 1973, JMC-300 Grace (later MC-4156) for the Maria Clara Rail Tours service, and JMC-319 Luster (later the streamliner MC-6366 Nikkō) for the Peñafrancia Express service. JMC-319 now survives as Inspector Car IC-888 awaiting repairs in Caloocan.
Philippine National Railways
KiHa 52-100		DMU	60	100	7	1962–66	Niigata	1,067 mm (3 ft 6 in)	Former JR East rolling stock acquired in 2009. 6 units were already withdrawn from service altogether, while KiHa 52-122 is Currently sporting the "Rescue" livery
MCBP		DMU	59	95	16	1973	Tokyu Car	1,067 mm (3 ft 6 in)	Inter-city rail variant of the MC class commuter multiple unit of 1968. The MCBP class comprises 4 MCBP motor cars and 12 first-generation TA trailer cars. MCBP-4, the last of its kind and was used in the inspection train set, was scrapped between 2004 and 2016.
MC-300		DMU	59	95	1	1968–70	Tokyu Car	1,067 mm (3 ft 6 in)	The first commuter-purpose DMUs under PNR service and basis for the CMC series. Only 1 unit is in non-revenue service with the PNR as of 2016.
CMC-200		DMU	59	95	1	1974–76	Tokyu Car	1,067 mm (3 ft 6 in)	CMC-201 is still in service with the rail maintenance crew. The two CMC-200s were built solely by Tokyu Car, and were also combined with the CTC-100 trailer cars.
CMC-300		DMU	59	95	20	1974–76	Tokyu Car; Niigata; Fuji; Kinki Sharyo	1,067 mm (3 ft 6 in)	Originally a class of 22 DMU railcars.

== Non-revenue equipment ==
Locomotives:
- DEL: Diesel-electric
- DHL: Diesel-hydraulic
- STE: Steam locomotive with tender
- ST: Tank locomotive
Railroad cars:
- B: Baggage car
- C: Coach
- HEP: Head end power car
- S: Sleeping car
Multiple units:
- BEMU: Battery electric multiple unit
- DMU: Diesel multiple unit
- EMU: Electric multiple unit

Non operational equipment:

- RC: Rail crane
- RR: road–rail vehicle
- F: Flat-car

Class	Image	Type	Top speed		Units	Built	Manufacturer	Gauge	Remarks
Class	Image	Type	mph	km/h	Units	Built	Manufacturer	Gauge	Remarks
FCD		C			4	1962	Iino Heavy Industries	1,067 mm (3 ft 6 in)	Cabooses built by Kyoto-based Iino Jukogyo Co., Ltd. One unit is active as an inspection car for the Philippine National Police.
KiHa 59		DMU	70	110	3	1967–68	JNR	1,067 mm (3 ft 6 in)	Former JR East Kogane trainset acquired in 2011. Stored in Calamba as of March 2024.
CMC-200		DMU	59	95	1	1974–76	Tokyu Car; Niigata; Fuji Heavy; Kinki Sharyo	1,067 mm (3 ft 6 in)	CMC-201 is still in service with the rail maintenance crew. It has been repainted similarly to KiHa 52.
CMC-300		DMU	59	95	2	1974–76	Tokyu Car; Niigata; Fuji Heavy; Kinki Sharyo	1,067 mm (3 ft 6 in)	Departmental vehicles CMC-382 and 366 are the last remaining units as of 2021.
LM250		DEL	32	50	2	2020	SVI SpA	1,067 mm (3 ft 6 in)	First new order of switchers/shunters since 1992 and of European locomotives since 1976.
NZS0801		RC			1	2019	CRRC	1,067 mm (3 ft 6 in)	A Railway Crane procured by the PNR from CRRC in 2018. The Railway Crane was delivered to PNR in the 4th quarter of 2021. A trial run of the Railway Crane was conducted on November 11, 2021.
Kubota RTV-X1140		RR	25	40	4	2020	Kubota	road–rail vehicle (Note: can be fit with 1,067 mm (3 ft 6 in) bogies)	The PNR owns at least four Kubota road–rail vehicles. Currently used for maintenance and inspection works along the Mainline South.
NX70		F	75	120	10	2025	Tongling Tieke Railway Equipment Co., Ltd	1,067 mm (3 ft 6 in)	The PNR has procured 10 flatcars from Tongling Tieke Railway Equipment recently for frieght/maintenance works. Currently settling in Calamba Yard.
