= 8100 class =

8100 class may refer to:

- CIÉ 8100 Class, electric multiple units
- PNR 8100 class, diesel multiple units
