= PNR 8300 class =

Class of coaches operated by the Philippine National Railways

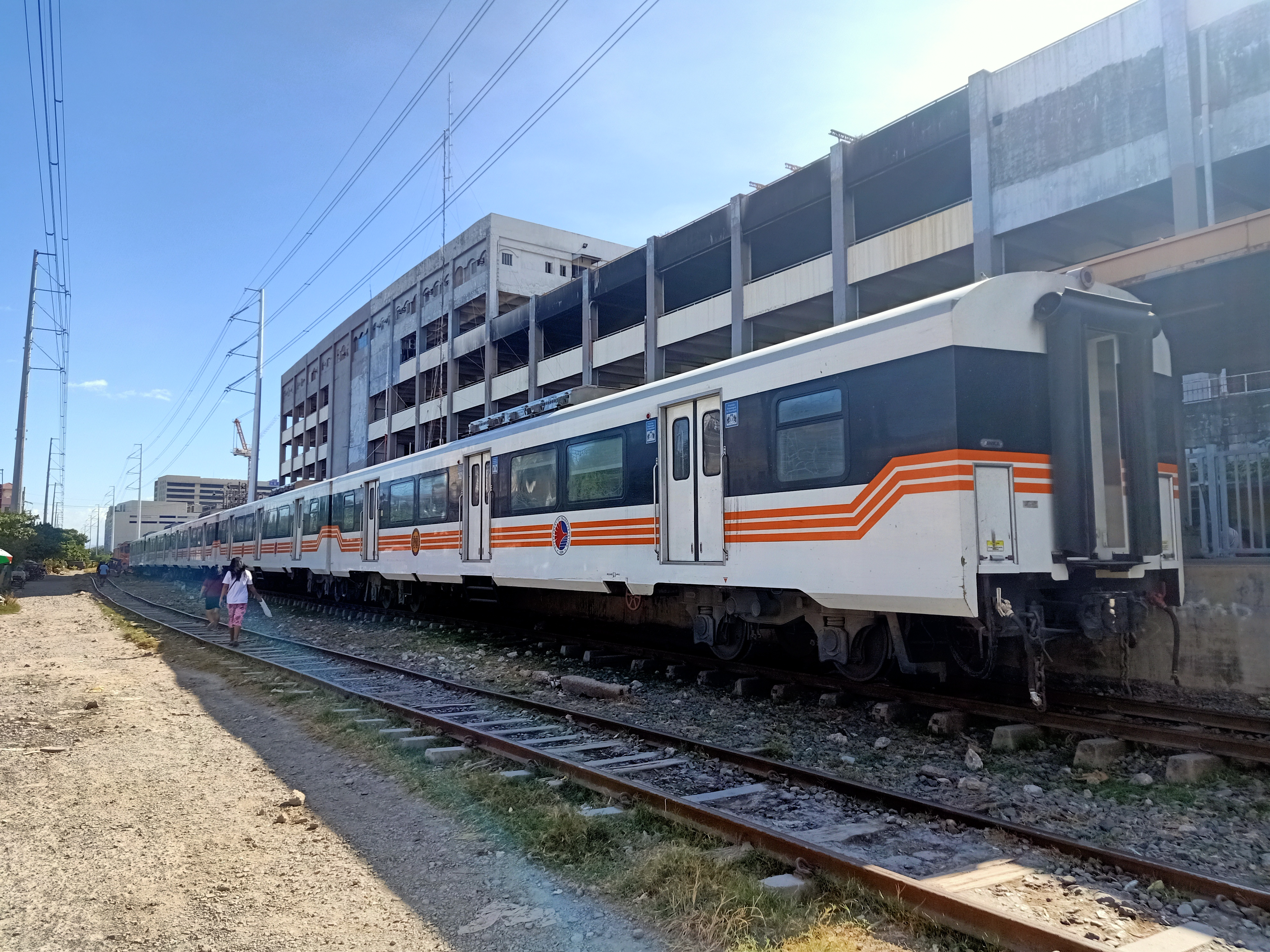
- 8300 class coaches at Alabang station in March 2022

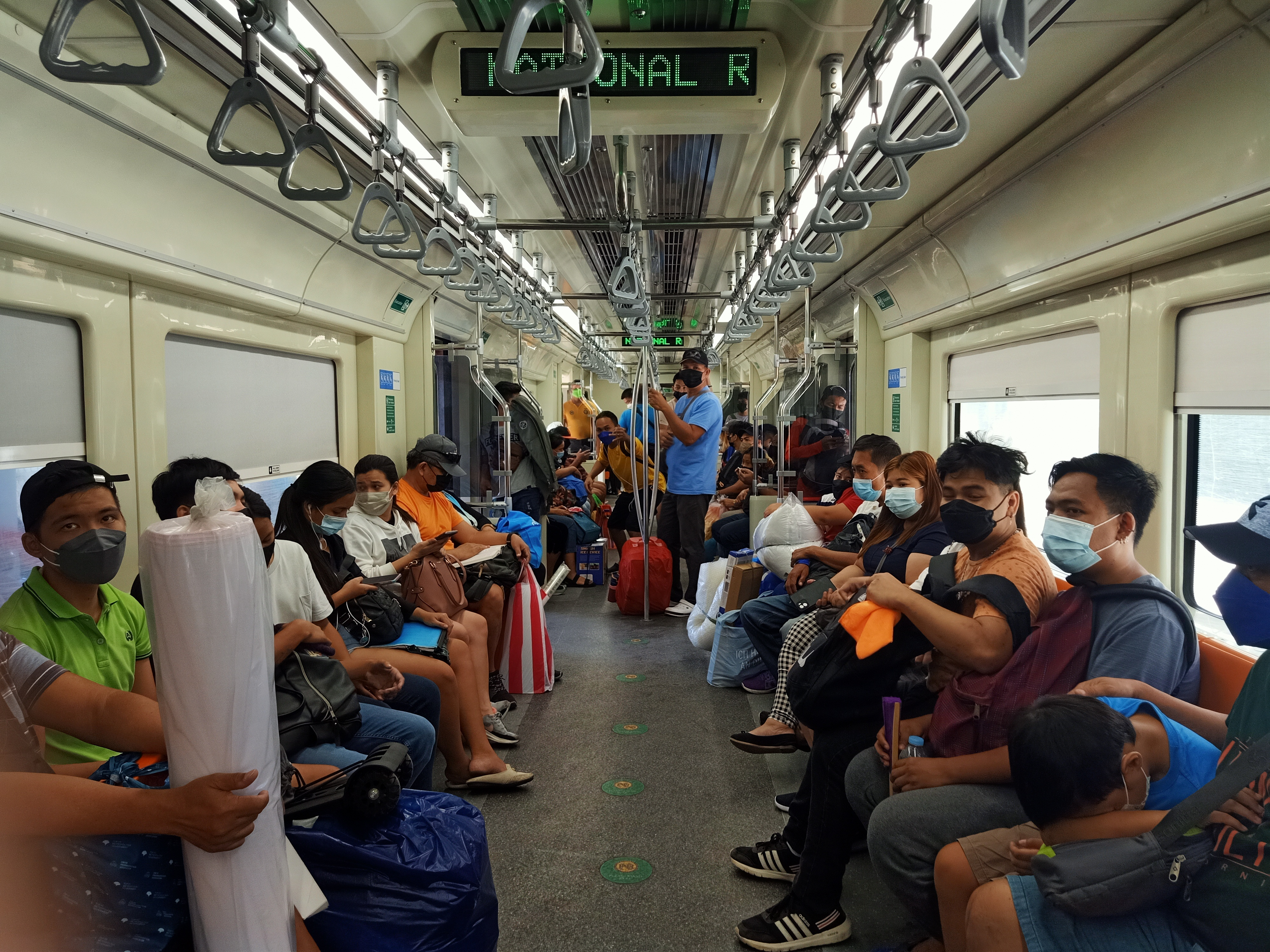
- Interior of the 8300 class in March 2022, similar to the 8000 class and 8100 class
- Stock type: Passenger coach
- In service: 2021–present
- Manufacturer: Industri Kereta Api
- Built at: Madiun, Indonesia
- Family name: INKA K3 coach
- Replaced: KiHa 350 (for Bicol Commuter Services)
- Constructed: 2019–2020
- Entered service: January 28, 2021; 4 years ago
- Number built: 15 vehicles (3 sets)
- Number in service: 10 vehicles (2 sets)
- Formation: 5 coaches per trainset / 3 coaches [temporary] per trainset (Bicol Commuter)
- Fleet numbers: 8301–8303
- Capacity: 266 per carriage 1,330 total passengers
- Operators: Philippine National Railways
- Depots: Tayuman Yard
- Lines served: Metro Commuter Line (2021–2024); Inter-Provincial Commuter (2022–2023); Bicol Commuter (2023–)

Specifications
- Car body construction: Stainless steel
- Train length: 103.5 m (339 ft 7 in) (5-car trainset with couplers)
- Car length: 20.7 m (67 ft 11 in)
- Width: 2.99 m (9 ft 10 in)
- Height: 3.53 m (11 ft 7 in)
- Floor height: 1.10 m (3 ft 7 in)
- Platform height: 1.10 m (3 ft 7 in) (MSC); Ground-height platforms (Inter-Provincial)
- Entry: Level (MSC); Step (IPC)
- Doors: 3 double-leaf doors per side; interior-sliding type
- Wheelbase: 2,200 mm (87 in)
- HVAC: ICOND roof-mounted air-conditioning
- Bogies: Bolsterless type
- Coupling system: AAR/knuckle
- Seating: Longitudinal
- Track gauge: 1,067 mm (3 ft 6 in)

The PNR 8300 class, also referred to as INKA coaches, is a class of locomotive-hauled passenger coaches operated by the Philippine National Railways since 2021.

== Operational history ==
=== Purchase ===
The Philippine National Railways received a budget through the 2018 General Appropriations Act for the purchase of trains. On May 28, 2018, three INKA CC300 locomotives and fifteen passenger coaches were ordered together with four sets of four-car trains worth ₱2.5 billion (US$47.4 million).

=== Delivery and commissioning ===
The INKA CC300 locomotives and INKA 8300 coaches were delivered on December 23, 2020, and were unveiled on the same day. Passenger trial runs begun on January 15, 2021, for 150-hour RAMS validation tests, while the trains were officially inaugurated on January 28, 2021, at Dela Rosa station together with the Philippine National Railways and the Department of Transportation officials. The trains officially entered revenue service on the same day.

The trains once served the PNR Metro South Commuter line between Tutuban and Alabang and vice versa. These were subsequently assigned to Bicol Commuter services. As of August 2023, DHL 9002 and 3-car PC 8302 serve Naga–Ligao services, while DHL 9003 and PC 8303 serves the Naga–Sipocot route.

On October 22, 2024, rains brought by Tropical Storm Trami (local name Kristine), registered were recorded as high as 578.9 mm in just one day. causing the PNR Naga depot to be flooded, affecting INKA DHL 9003, a PNR 8000 class unit, a KiHa 52 rescue train, KiHa 35, KiHa 59 series, a PNR 2500 class and a PNR 5000 class locomotive. INKA DHL 9002 was in Legazpi City and not affected by the flood and served the Naga City-Sipocot route..

On September 17, 2025, 9003 was scheduled to conduct a trial run up to PNR Lupi station. However, in the area of Pobalacion, Lupi, a coach of the PNR 8300 unit derailed, resulting in the train becoming stranded.

== Design ==
The trains were manufactured by the Indonesian firm Industri Kereta Api, also known as INKA. The design were based on the middle coaches of the PNR 8000 class and 8100 class DMUs retaining the same specifications. The 8300 class coaches, along with the 8000 and 8100 DMUs are all given the designation K3 while in Indonesia.

=== Car body ===
The coaches sport a livery of white as the body color, with black in its windows and orange stripes. The coaches also bear the Philippine National Railways and the Department of Transportation logos.

Each car has one roof-mounted air-conditioning units that has a cooling capacity of 36,000 kcal (150,000 kJ). In total, there are five air-conditioning units in a five-car train set.

=== Interior ===
There are three double-leaf sliding doors per side and longitudinal seats are used. The interior design is the same as the middle cars of the 8000 and 8100 DMUs. The middle coach has a control room where the doors, lighting, and passenger announcements are controlled. Each car has closed-circuit television cameras installed.

== Gallery ==
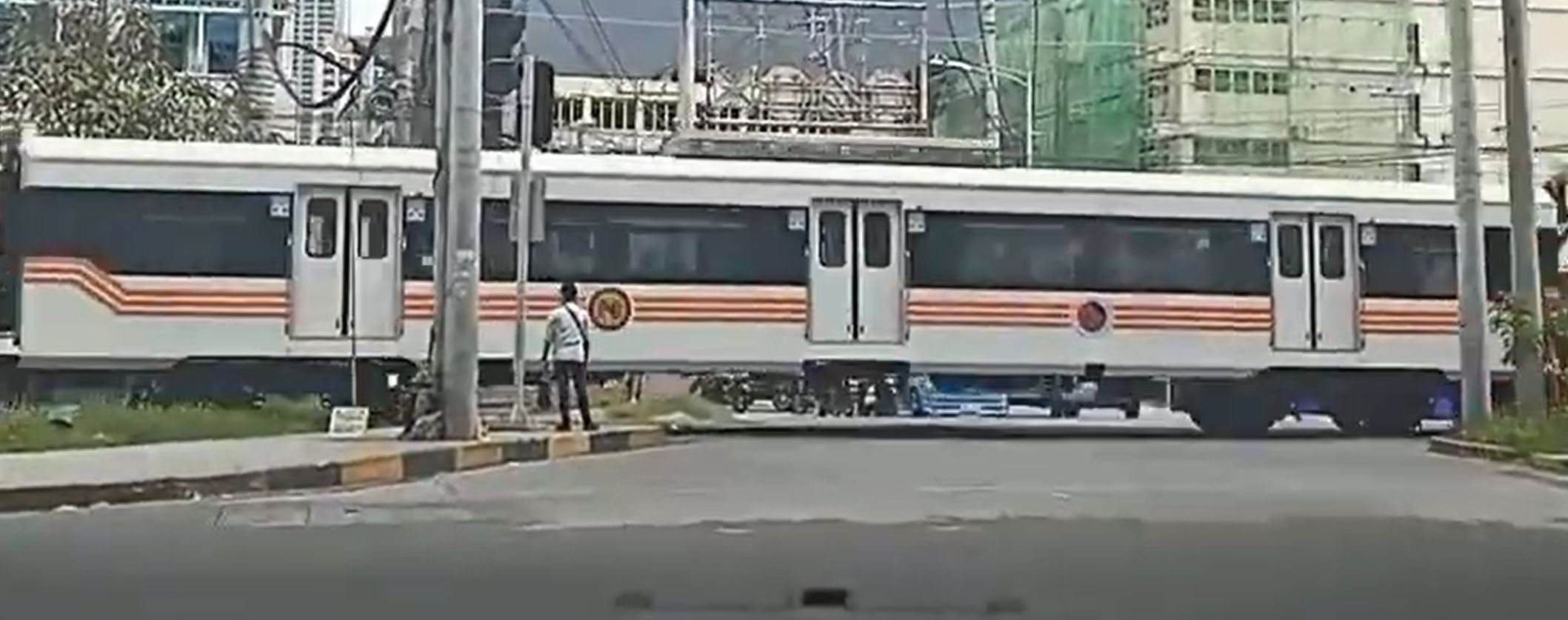
An 8300 class coach at Dela Rosa crossing

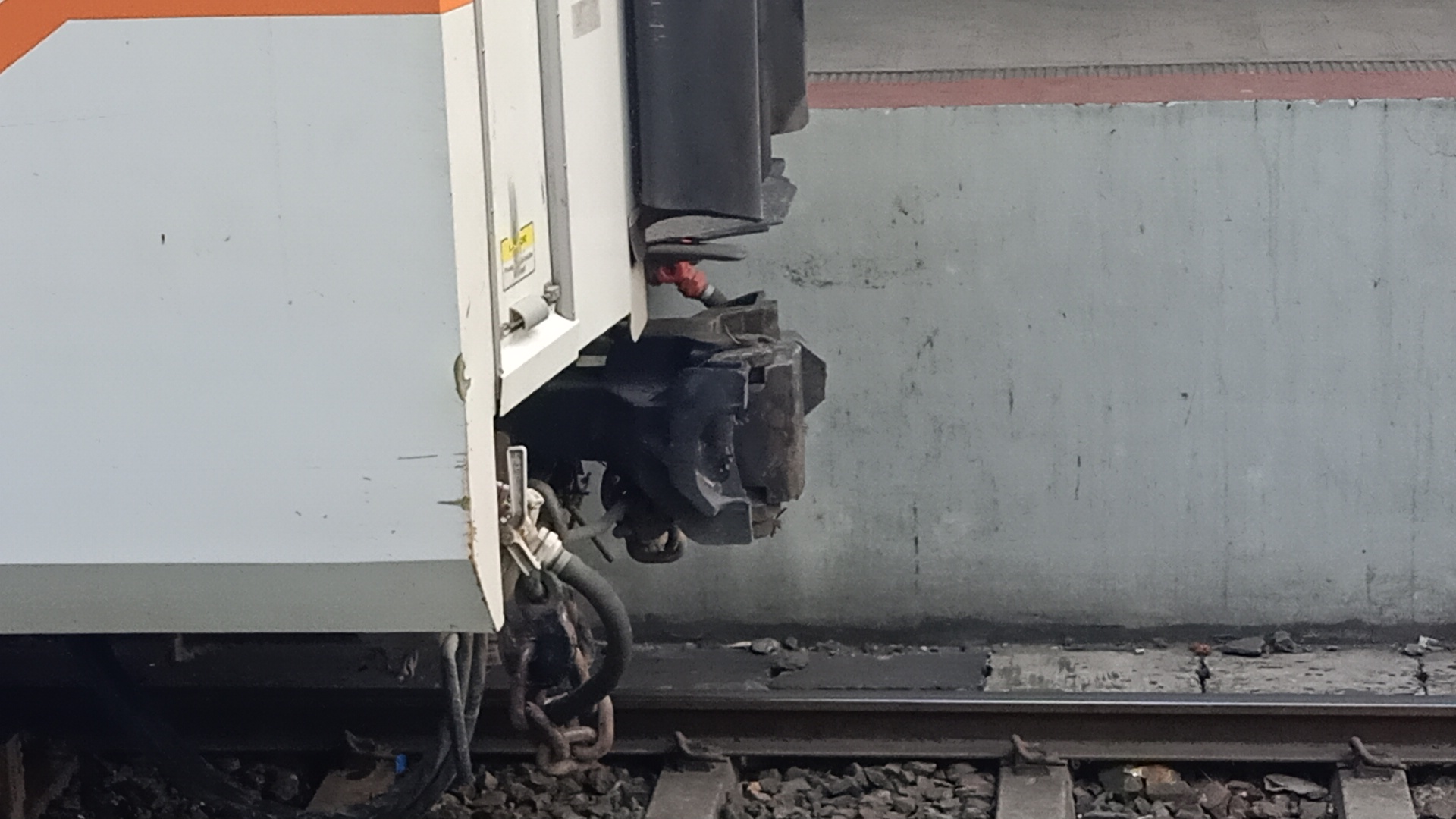
Coupler of the 8300 class coach

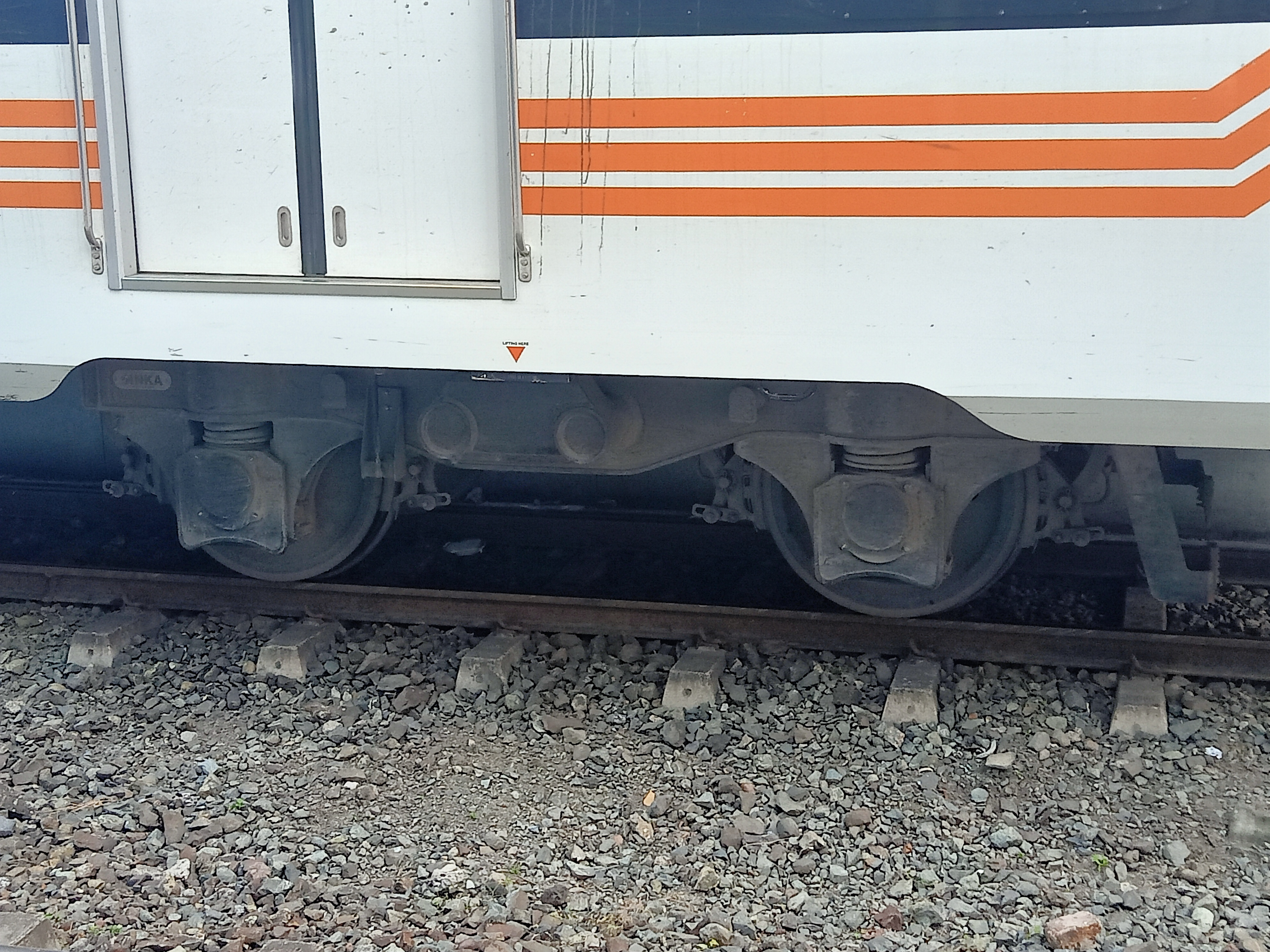
Bogie of the 8300 class coach

== See also ==
- PNR Hyundai Rotem DMU
- 203 series
- List of Philippine National Railways rolling stock
- PNR 8000 class
- PNR 8100 class
- INKA CC300
