= PNR Hyundai Rotem DMU =

Class of diesel multiple units operated by the Philippine National Railways

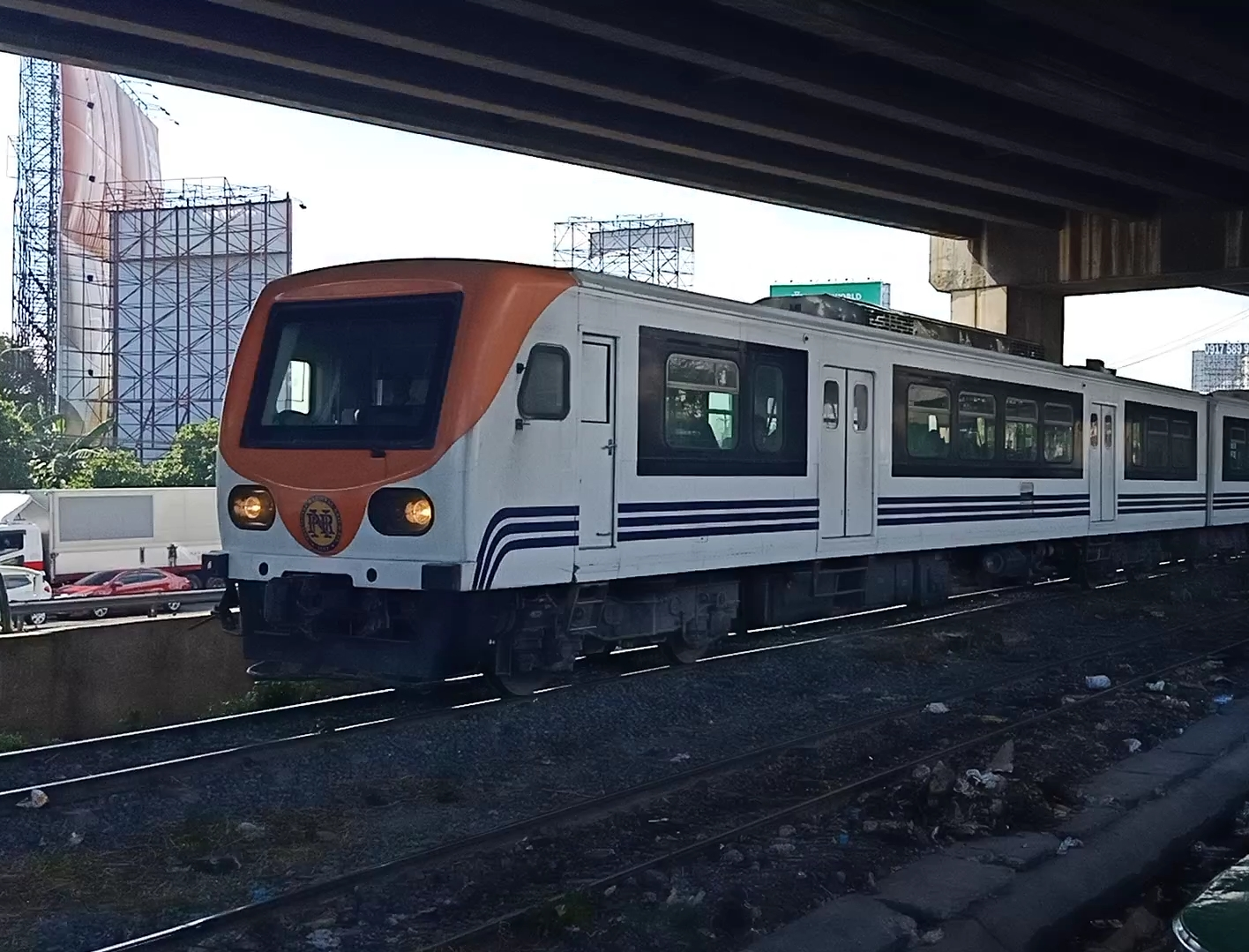
- DMU set 06 with its new livery in February 2020

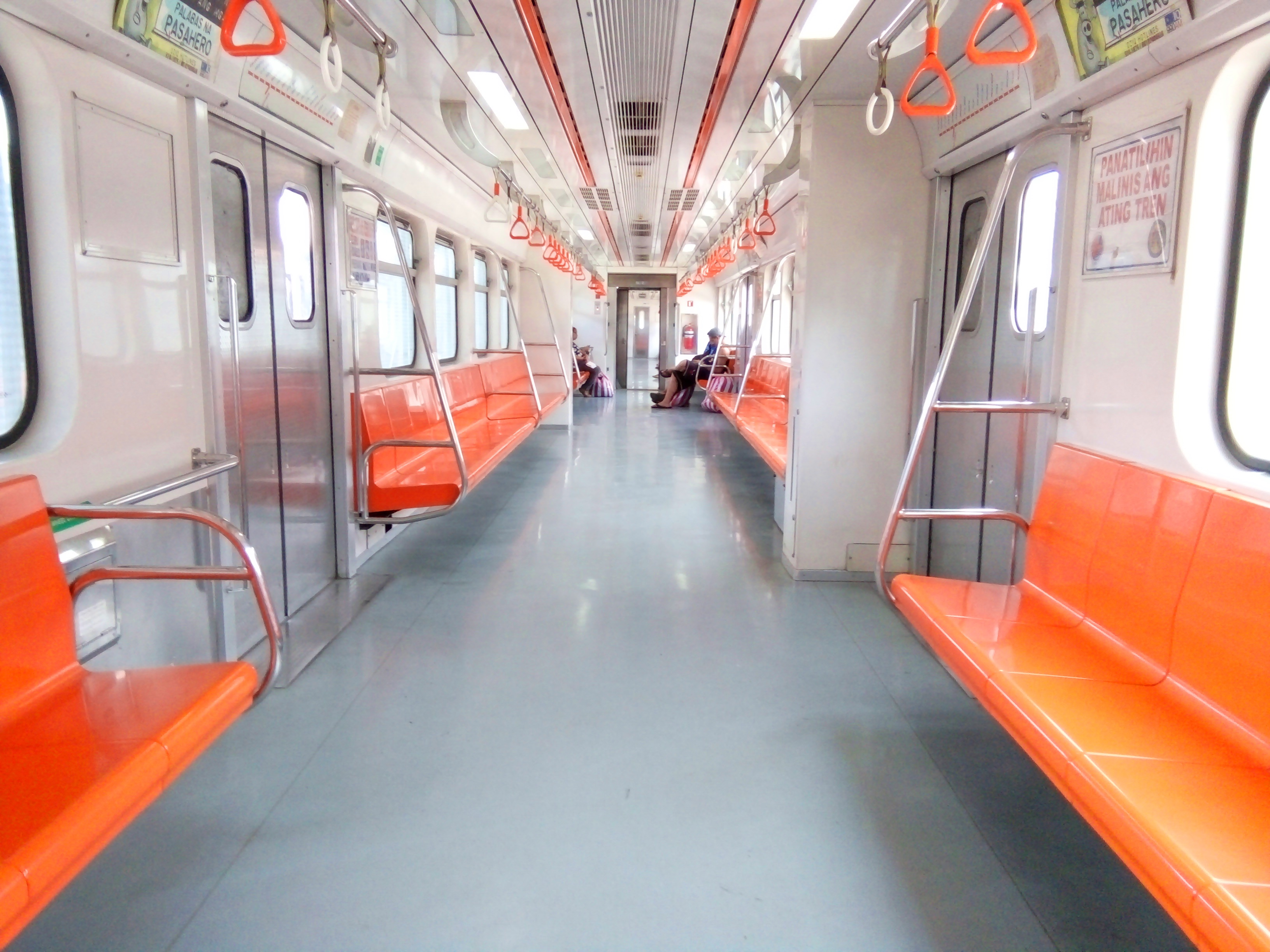
- Interior of the DMU in June 2019
- Stock type: Diesel multiple unit
- In service: 2009–present
- Manufacturer: Hyundai Rotem
- Built at: Changwon, South Korea
- Replaced: JNR 12 series coaches CMC class DMU (decommissioned 2004)
- Constructed: 2009
- Entered service: July 14, 2009; 17 years ago
- Refurbished: 2019
- Number built: 18 cars (6 sets)
- Number in service: 0 cars (0 set)
- Formation: 3 cars per trainset DMR–ITR–DMR
- Fleet numbers: DMR-01 to DMR-12; ITR-01 to ITR-06
- Capacity: 674 passengers
- Operator: Philippine National Railways
- Depot: Tutuban
- Line served: Metro Commuter Line (2009–2024)

Specifications
- Car body construction: Stainless steel
- Train length: 64.1 m (210 ft 3 5/8 in)
- Car length: 21.4 m (70 ft 2 33/64 in) (DMR); 21.3 m (69 ft 10 37/64 in) (ITR)
- Width: 2.85 m (9 ft 4 13/64 in)
- Height: 4.06 m (13 ft 3 27/32 in)
- Floor height: 1.2 m (3 ft 11 1/4 in)
- Doors: 3 sets of 1.5 m (59 in) double-leaf pocket doors per side
- Wheel diameter: 860–780 mm (34–31 in) (new–worn)
- Maximum speed: 80 km/h (50 mph) (Note: There was an occurrence of one of the DMU trains hitting at a speed of 90 kilometers per hour (56 mph).)
- Weight: Approx. 100 t (220,460 lb) (3-car trainset)
- Axle load: 15 t (33,000 lb)
- Prime mover: Cummins N14-R
- Power output: 260 kW (350 hp)
- Transmission: Diesel–hydraulic
- Auxiliaries: Auxiliary power supply unit (380V AC with additional 220V AC)
- HVAC: Roof-mounted air conditioning
- Bogies: Bolsterless type
- Braking system: Electro-pneumatic
- Coupling system: Janney coupler
- Seating: Longitudinal
- Track gauge: 1,067 mm (3 ft 6 in)

The PNR Hyundai Rotem DMU is a diesel multiple unit (DMU) train operated by the Philippine National Railways (PNR) since 2009.

== Operational history ==
=== Purchase ===
During the administration of then-President Gloria Macapagal Arroyo, a project to rehabilitate the PNR Metro Commuter Line was pursued. The first phase of the Northrail-Southrail Linkage Project, includes the purchase of DMUs. 21 DMU cars that can be configured into seven three-car sets were planned to be procured. However, due to budget constraints, the order was downgraded to 18 DMU cars or six three-car sets, as the budget was not enough to cover the seven sets.

In 2007, the South Korean consortium of Daewoo, Hanjin Heavy Industries and Construction, and Rotem was awarded the contract for the first phase of the Northrail-Southrail Linkage project. The consortium was appointed by PNR by way of negotiated procurement, wherein the government directly negotiates with contractors in case of an emergency. This happened after two failed biddings in early 2007.

The US$49.096-million project was funded by a US$50.42-million loan from the Export–Import Bank of Korea.

=== Operations ===
The PNR Hyundai Rotem DMU fleet entered service on July 14, 2009, coinciding with the launch of the new PNR system and logo. It was used for Commuter Express services running from Tutuban to Bicutan. The line eventually was extended to Sucat and up until Alabang on April 19, 2010. Plans were made for the possible upgrade of the trains in 2011, however, due to the procurement of the 203 series as the new main vehicles, the plan was scrapped.

The trains were last used in Metro North Commuter (MNC) services running from Governor Pascual to Bicutan. They are currently idle as the North and South Main Line has been closed for the construction of the North-South Commuter Railway.

=== Refurbishments ===
In July 2015, the then-Department of Transportation and Communications (later the Department of Transportation) conducted a bidding for the refurbishment of nine vehicles, equivalent to three sets. However, after the bidding period ended in September 2015, no new reports have surfaced in this refurbishment.

In November 2019, DMU Sets 05 and 06 received their new livery. The window mesh screens were removed for the installation of polycarbonate panels. The new panels eliminated the need of the window mesh screens as these are virtually shatterproof and can better withstand stoning and debris.

=== Status ===
As of April 2024, one set is serviceable and last ran in the Metro North Commuter (Gov. Pascual-Bicutan) Line.

As of August 2025, 1 set is being prepared to be shipped to Bicol and another set awaits repair.

Other sets either are currently idle, swapped from their initial formations or some damaged from accidents, either beyond economical repair or awaiting repair and refurbishment.

Trainset	Status	Configuration	Notes
Set 1	Inactive	DMR-07 + ITR-01 + DMR-03	
Set 2	Inactive	DMR? ITR-02 DMR-08	
Set 3	Inactive	DMR-12 ITR-03 DMR??	
Set 4	Inactive	ITR-04	Both its DMR's were reconfigured with another set.
Set 5	Inactive	DMR-02 + ITR-05 + DMR-10	DMR-05 derailed causing PNR to Put DMR-10 in Set 5. Currently being prepared for shipment to Bicol.
Set 6	Inactive	DMR-04 + ITR-06 + DMU-06	DMR-09 was damaged in an accident involving a boom crane that rendered it inoperable. DMR-02 was repainted to reactivate the set weeks later. Currently parked at Tutuban station.

== Design ==
=== Car body ===
The train was introduced as the first lightweight, stainless steel made trainsets of the PNR in 2009.

When the trains first entered service, there were two livery variants. There were DMUs that sported a silver-colored body and orange lining with white-colored front cabs and the old PNR logo used in the 1960s. Another was a variant with the same silver-colored body and orange lining but with the cabs sporting colors of white and blue, and stylized PNR FilTrack logos on the side windows of the front cabs and in the middle of the ITR car.

By 2015, all remaining active DMU units sported a navy blue livery, while still maintaining the orange lining in its sides.

The current livery used since 2019 has orange at the front and the body is mostly covered white with blue stripes at the side. The PNR logo is placed at the front of the Rotem DMUs.

A new variation of the above has black instead at the front, matching the color scheme used by the INKA DMUs, first seen in November 2023.

=== Interior ===
The seats of the trains are longitudinal-type and are made up of fiber-reinforced plastic. The trains have 2 double-leaf, electro-pneumatically operated sliding doors per side with a width of 1.5 meters (4 ft 11 in). There is an additional pair of single-leaf doors at the driver cab.

The design capacity of a three-car trainset is 674 passengers.

=== Bogies and electrical components ===
The front and rear bogies of the DMR cars are engine-propelled driven, while the bogies under the ITR cars are trailer bogies. Each DMU has two sets of auxiliary power supply units under the ITR cars which generates three-phase 380V AC and additional 220V AC.

=== Formation ===
	3-car trainset		
Car No.	1	2	3
Designation	DMR	ITR	DMR
Numbering	DMR-xx	ITR-xx	DMR-xx

== Images ==
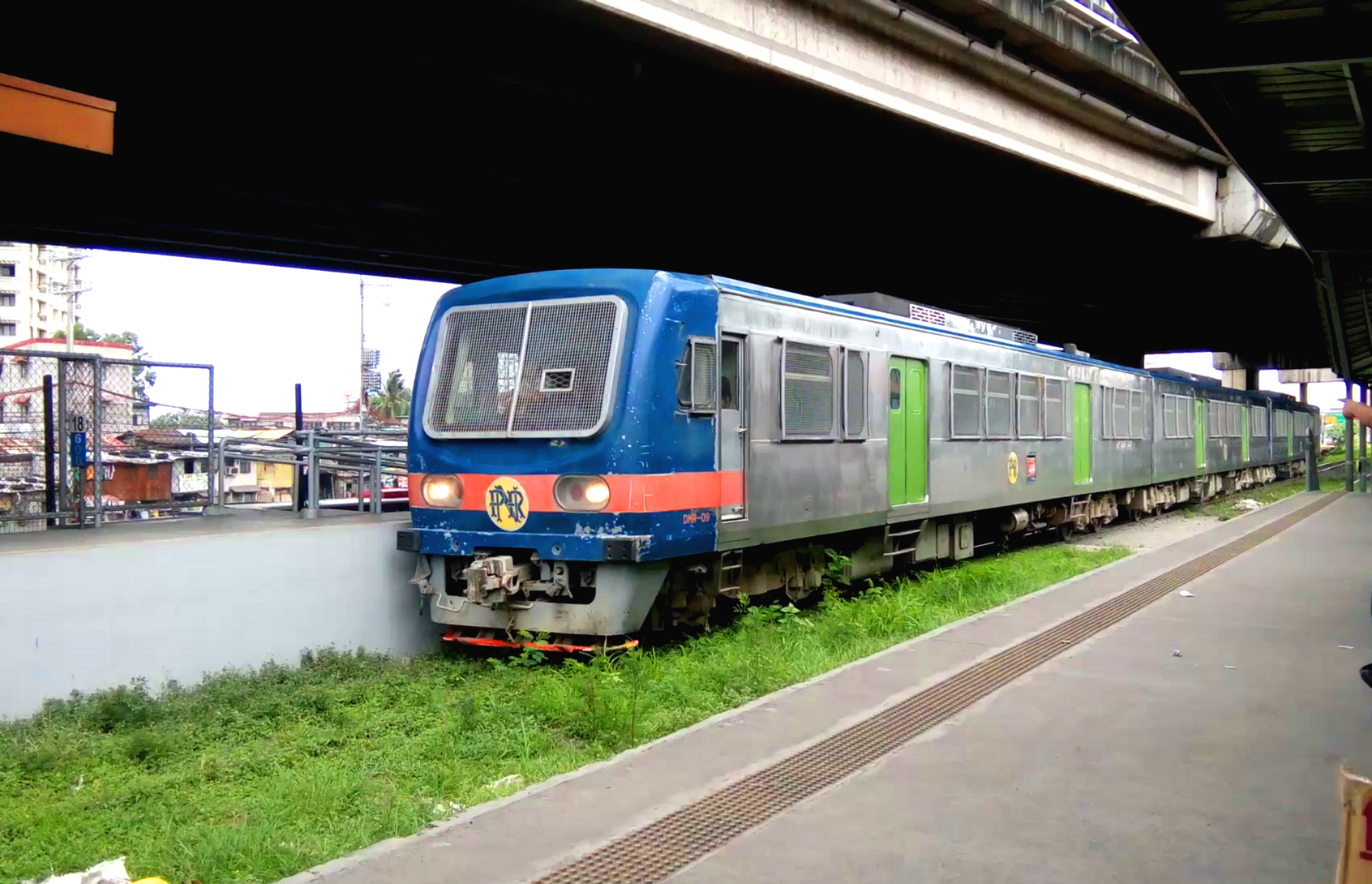
Set 05 at FTI station (July 2019)

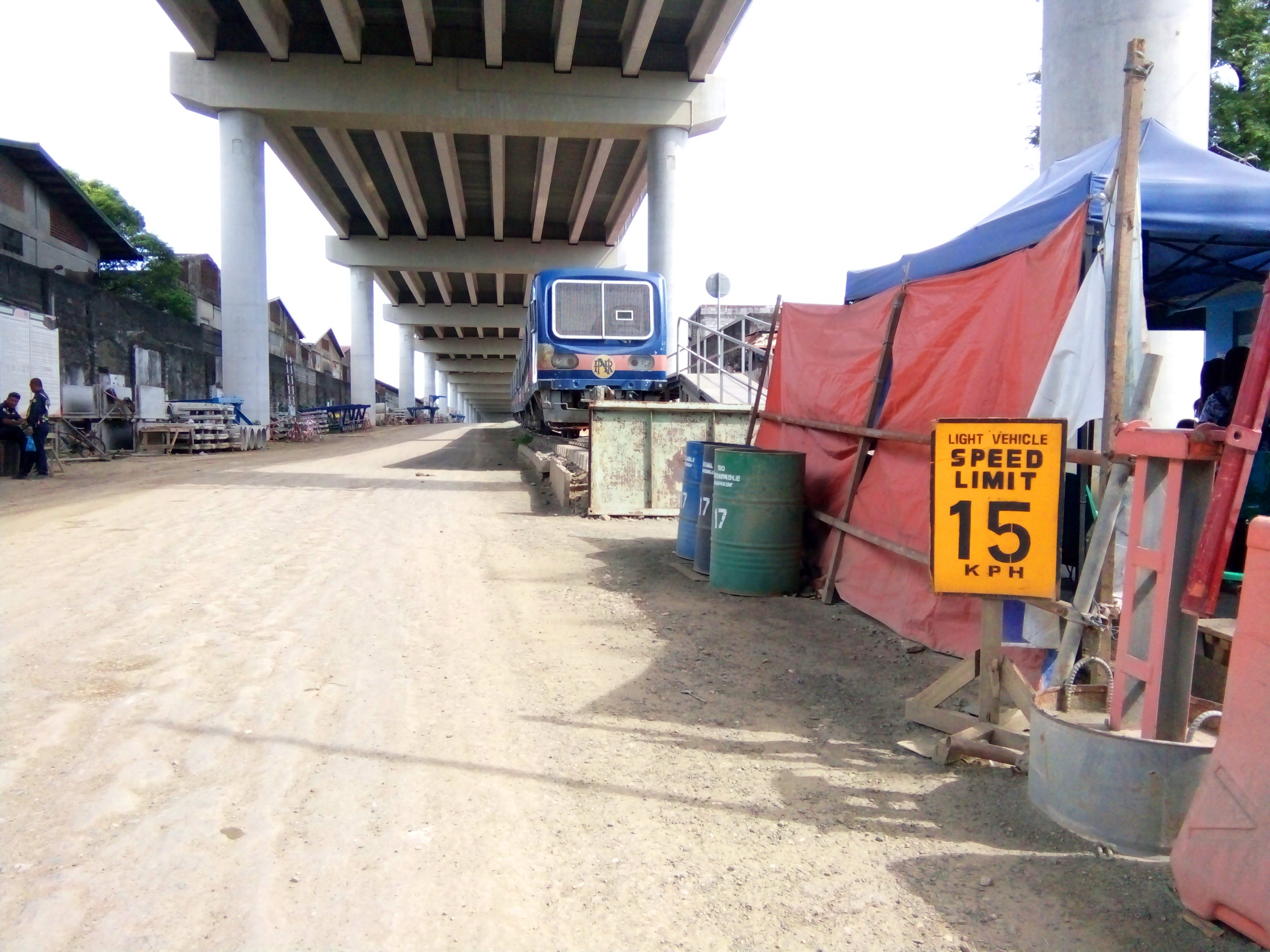
DMU Set 06 at Gov. Pascual station

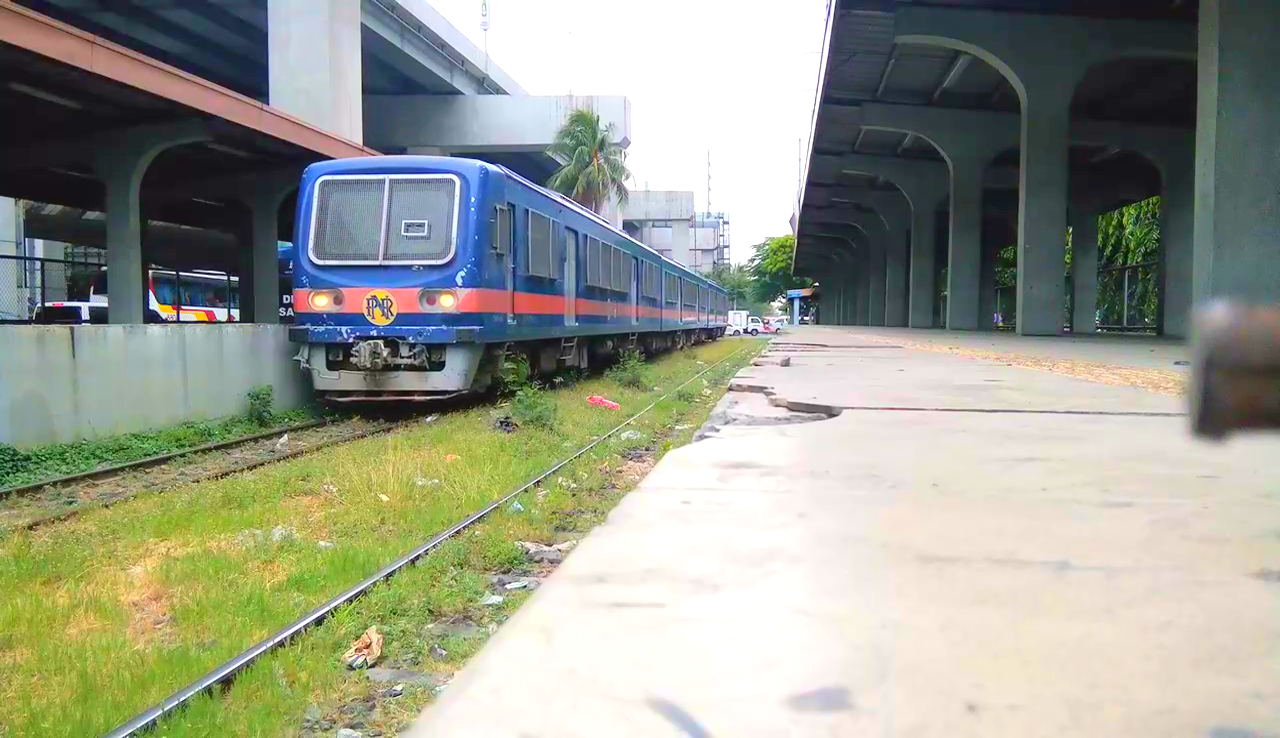
DMU Set 05 passing Buendia station

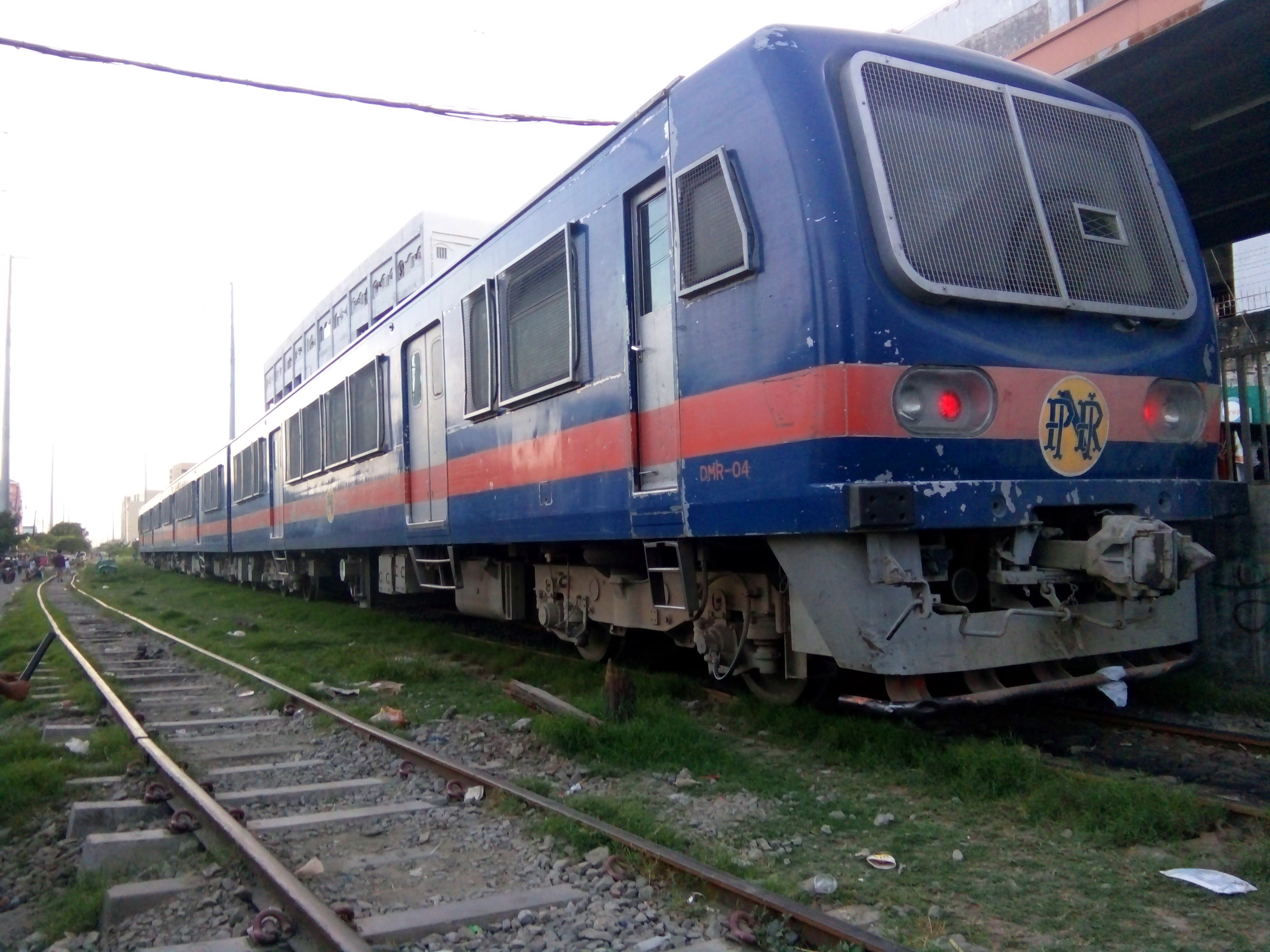
DMU Set 05 at Alabang (2019)

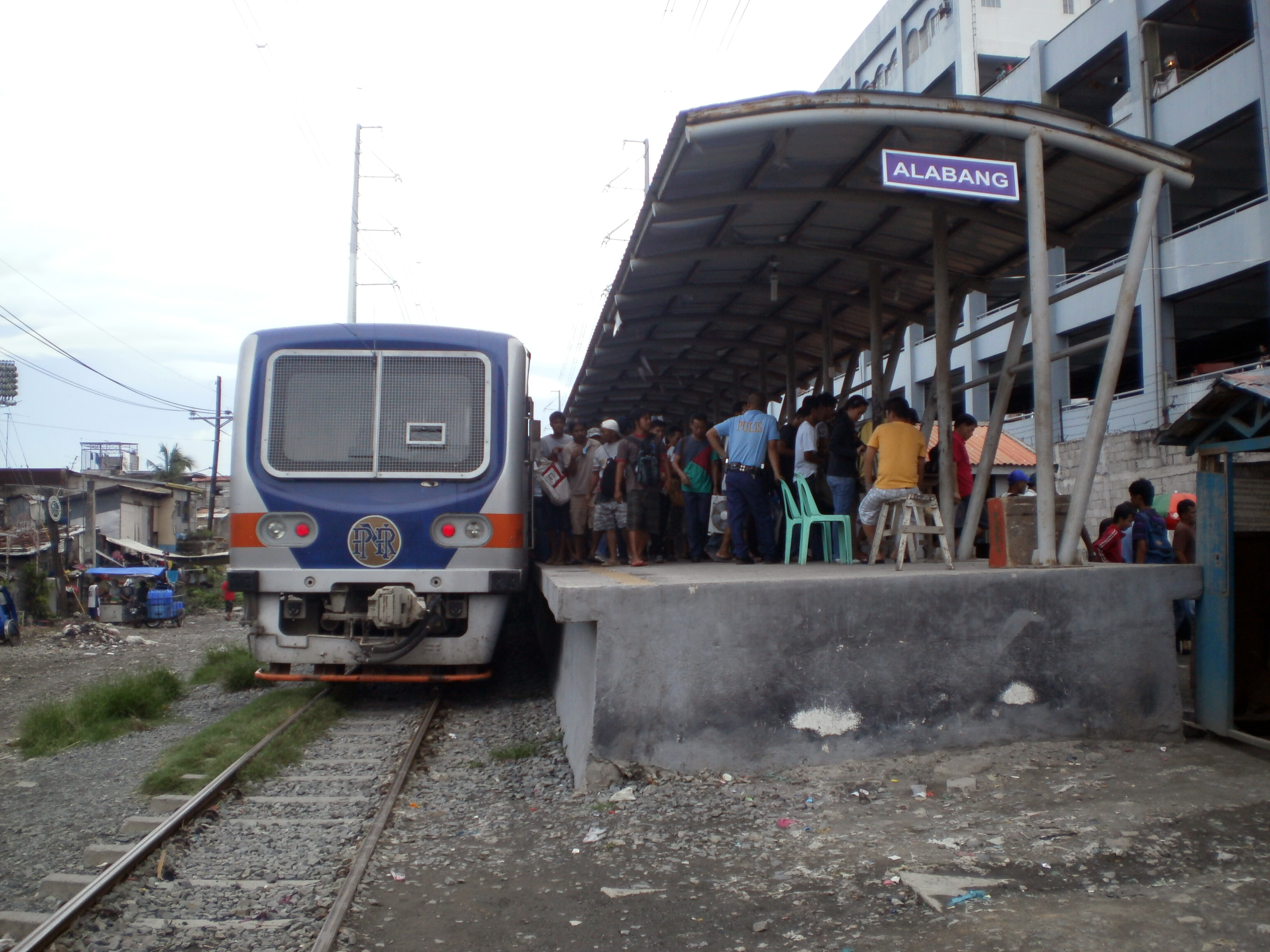
PNR DMU at Alabang station (2011)

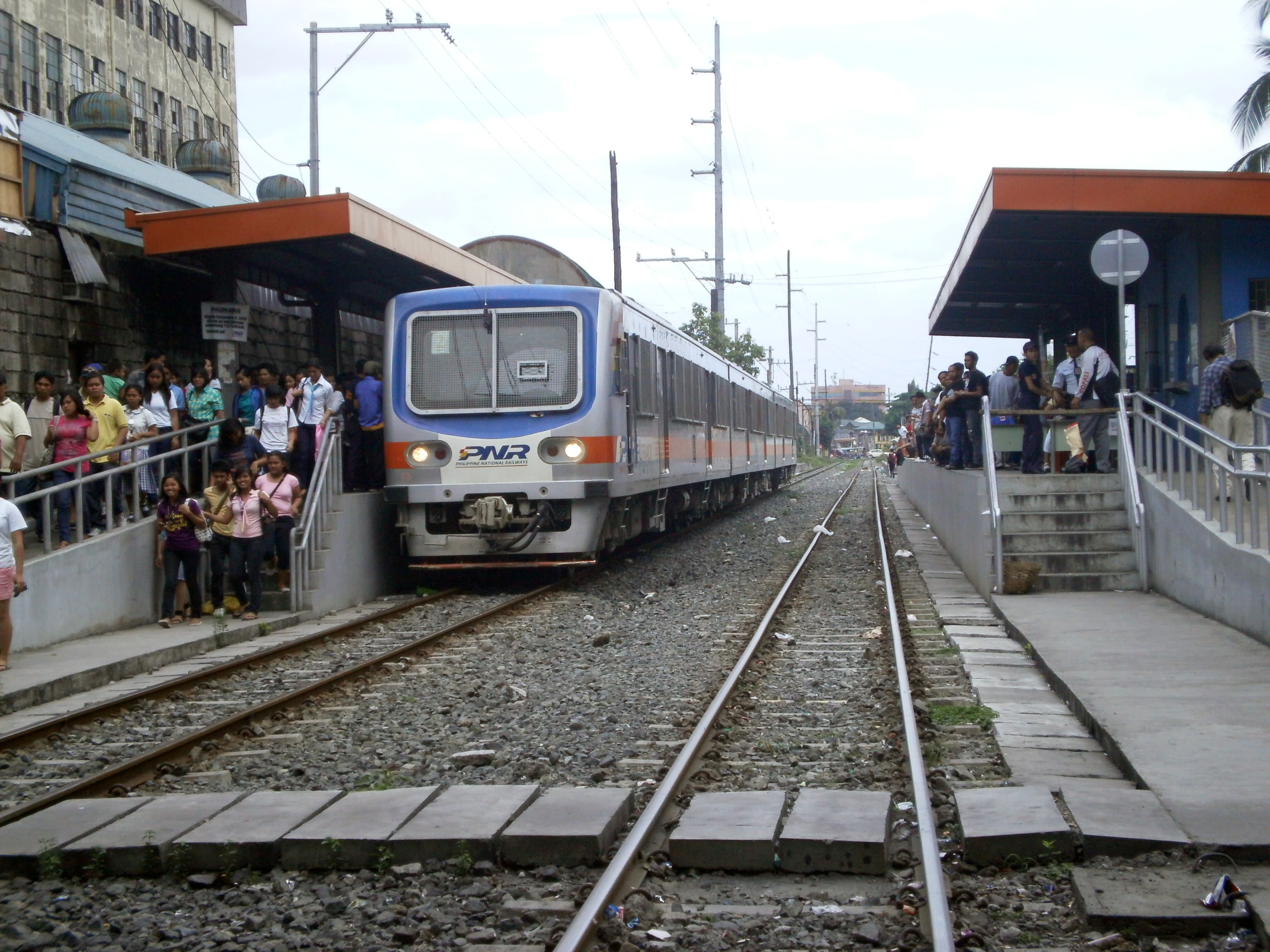
PNR DMU at Blumentritt station (2011)

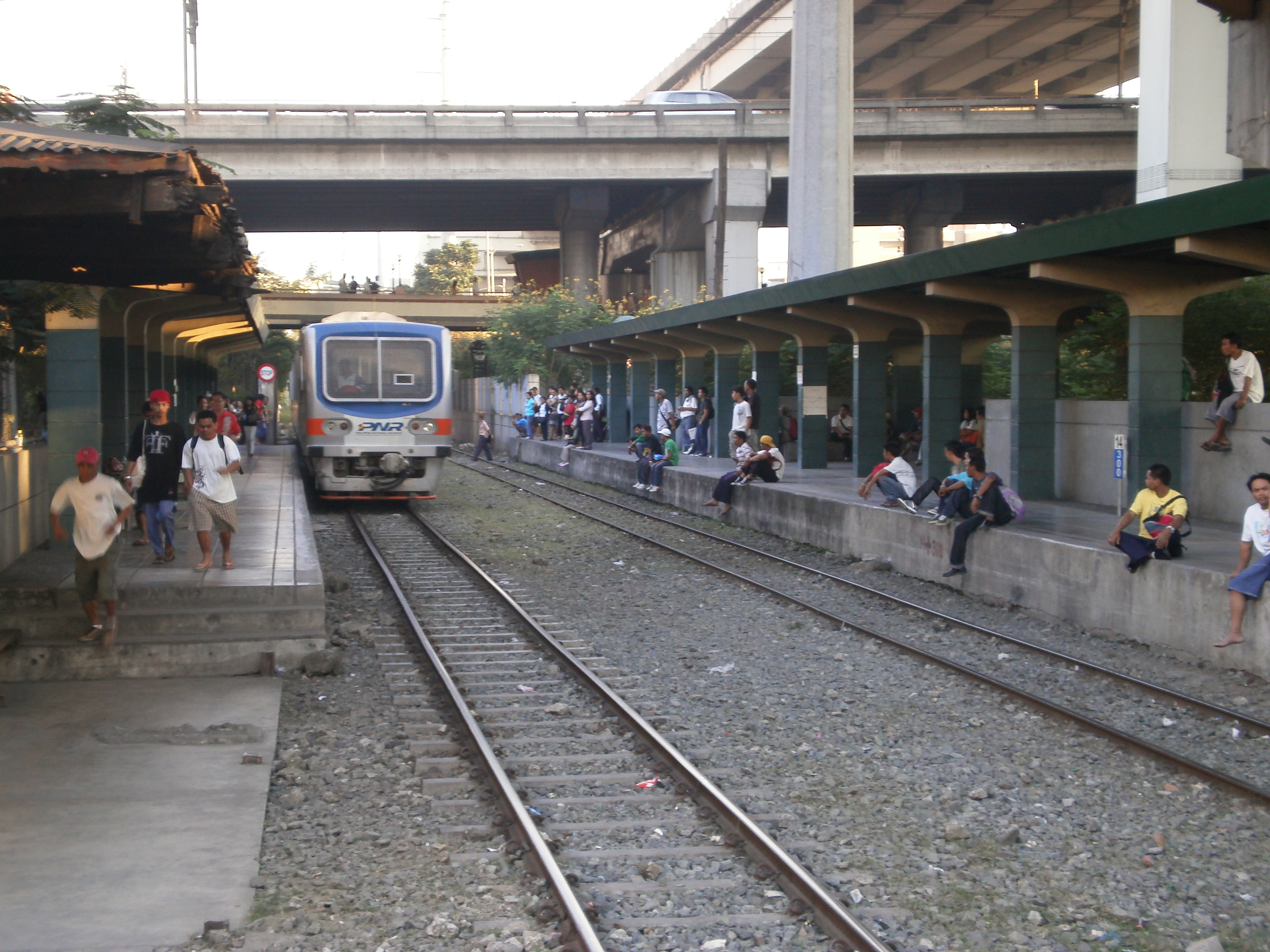
PNR DMU at EDSA station (2011)

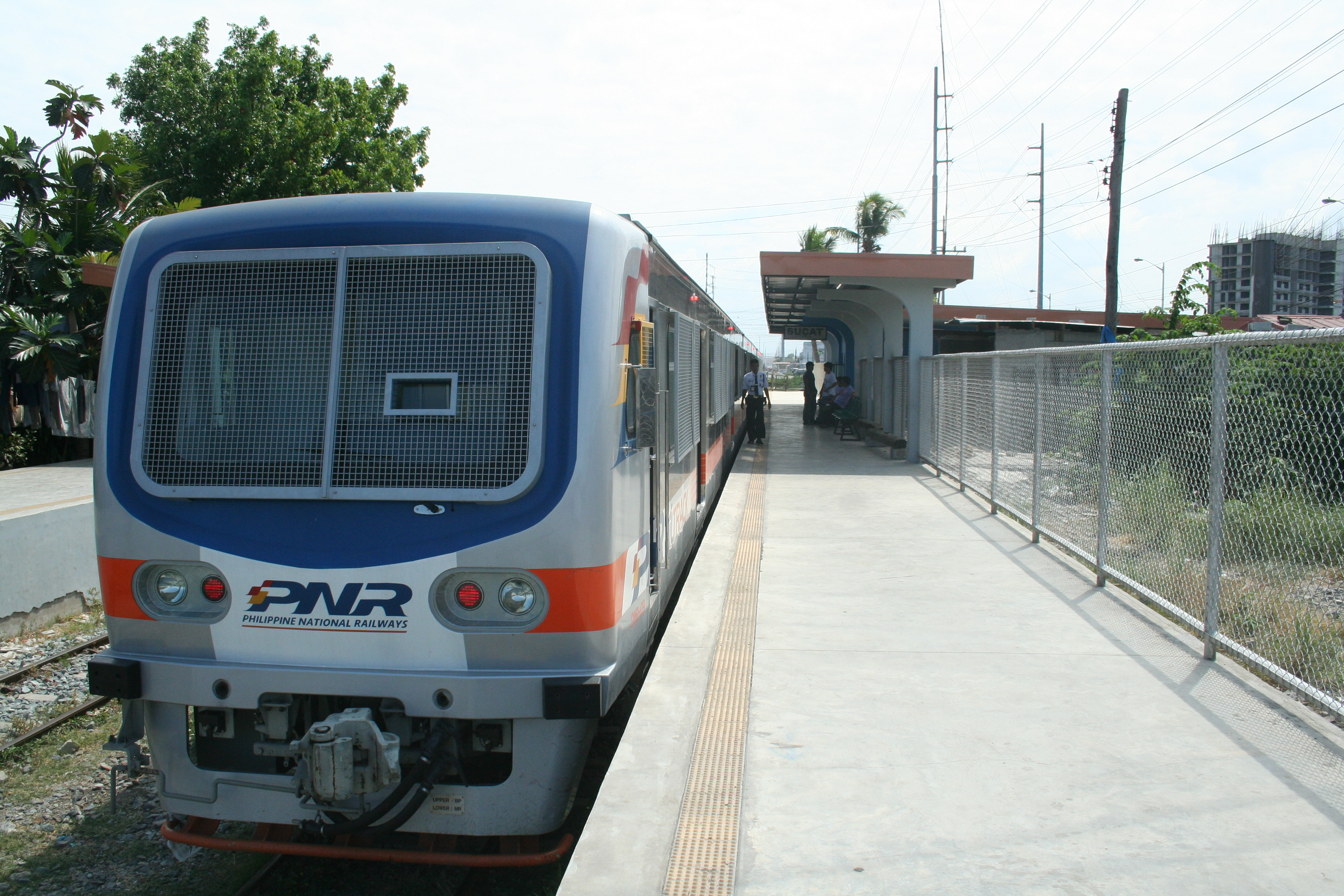
PNR DMU at Sucat station

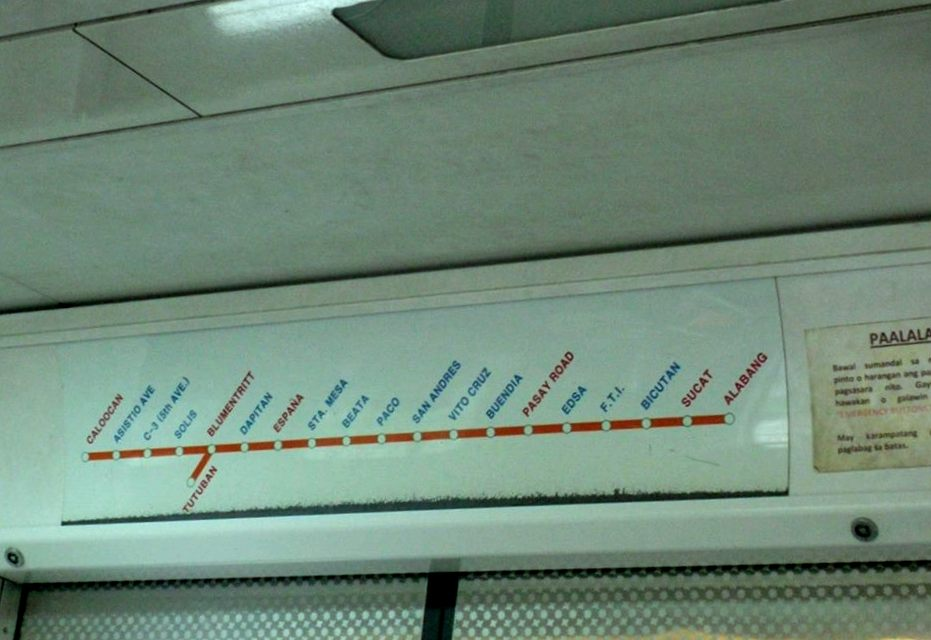
Route map displayed inside the DMU

== Accidents and incidents ==
=== 2010s ===
- On April 29, 2011, DMR-11 of the original Set 06 collided with a Coca-Cola truck at Manalac Crossing located in Tanyag, Taguig.
- On May 19, 2014, a DMU train collided with a jeepney in the Balic-Balic railroad crossing while operating a southbound train. A person was dead and more than 6 are injured. The accident caused delays in the train operations.
- On April 29, 2015, Set 03 derailed between EDSA railway station and Nichols railway station. There were 50 reported injuries and mostly are minor cases. The incident was caused by missing parts of the railtracks that were stolen. This however, prompted PNR operations to be suspended on May 5, 2015, to conduct safety tests by PNR and TÜV Rheinland. The operations of the PNR resumed on July 23, 2015.

=== 2020s ===
- On January 1, 2020, Set 05's windshield was shattered due to a stoning incident while performing an MNC Trip at Caloocan. The glass window was replaced with polycarbonate the day after the incident. It was also found that a group of minors were the ones who did the crime.
- On June 3, 2020, Set 06 rammed a car at Abad Santos Railroad Crossing in Tondo, Manila. The crossing barrier was not down when the accident happened. The train dragged the car for about 10 meters (33 ft).
- On September 2, 2021, a DMU train rammed a blue car at the Piy Margal Railroad Crossing in Manila despite early warning by the crossing keepers. No injuries were reported. The PNR management is yet to release a statement about the absence of barriers at the railroad crossing, particularly at the southbound lane.
- On September 25, 2022, Set 06 collided with a crane while performing a MNC service in Sta. Mesa, Manila, causing three injuries. The crane involved in the accident was used for the NLEX Connector project. The front area of the train was smashed on the right side. No statements from the construction company nor PNR have been released so far. The damaged unit, DMR-09, was brought to the Caloocan shops after the accident.

== See also ==
=== Current Philippine National Railways rolling stock ===
- PNR 900 class
- PNR 2500 class
- PNR 8000 class
- PNR 8100 class
- PNR 8300 class
- PNR 9000 class
- KiHa 52

=== Philippine rail rolling stock manufactured by Hyundai Rotem ===
- LRTA 1100 class
- LRTA 2000 class
