= PNR 8100 class =

Class of diesel multiple units operated by the Philippine National Railways

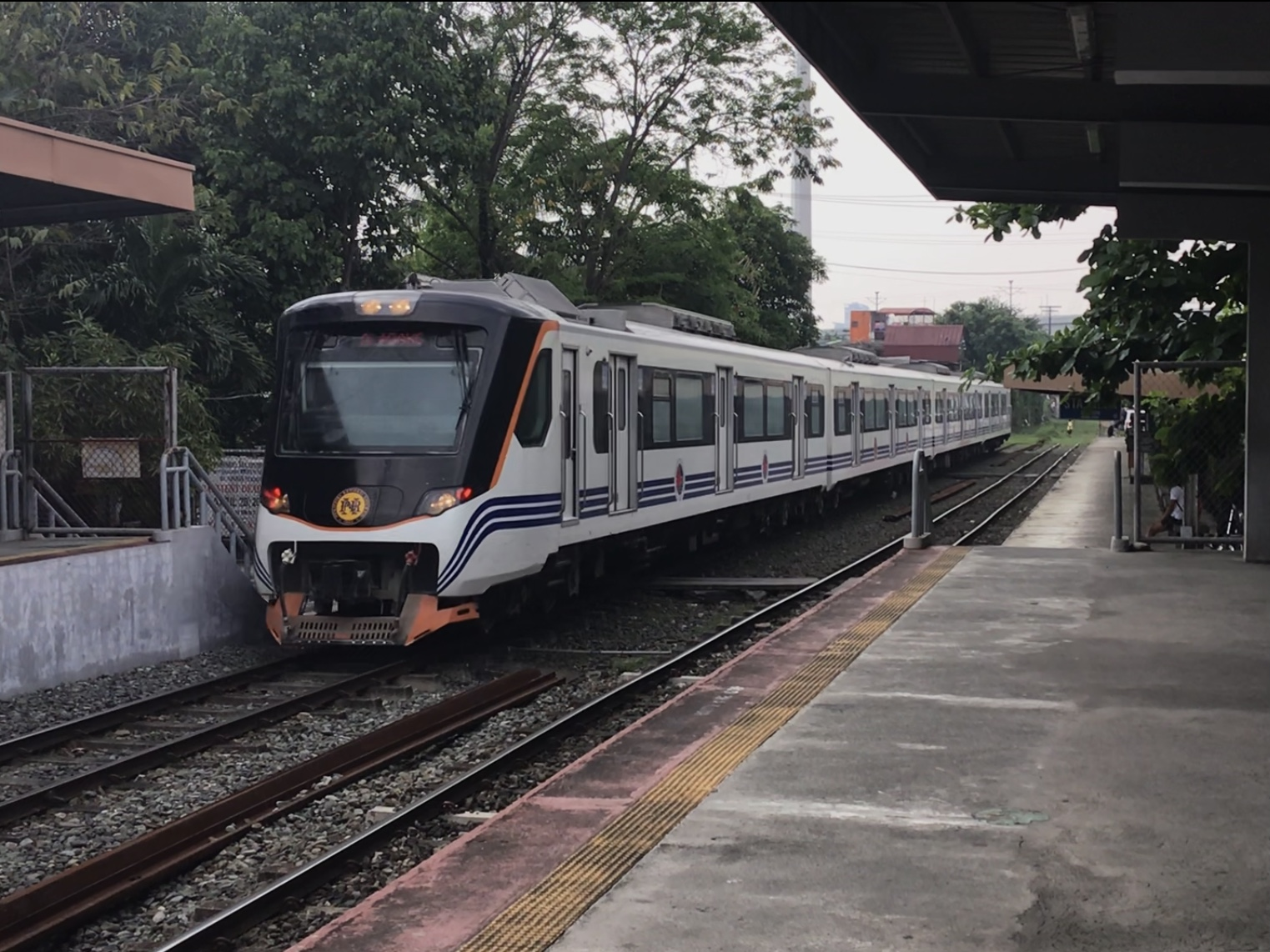
- 8100 class DMU at Santa Mesa station

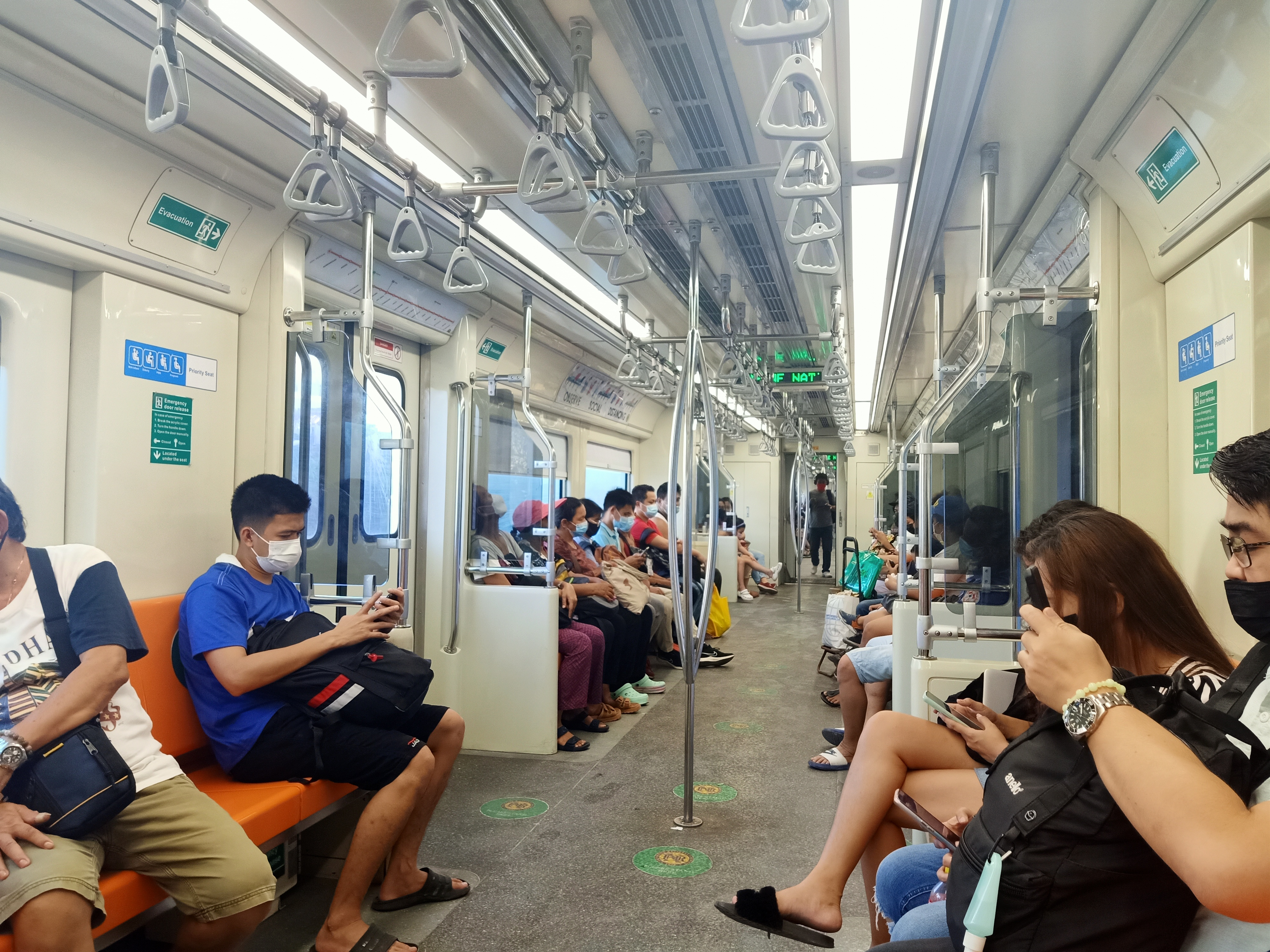
- Interior of the trailer car in March 2022
- Stock type: Diesel multiple unit
- In service: 2020–present
- Manufacturer: Industri Kereta Api
- Built at: Madiun, Indonesia
- Family name: INKA KRDE ME 204 Set
- Replaced: KiHa 350; KiHa 52; 203 series
- Constructed: 2019–2020
- Entered service: February 20, 2020; 5 years ago
- Number built: 16 vehicles (4 sets)
- Number in service: 12 vehicles (3 sets)
- Formation: 4 cars per trainset MeC1–TC1–TC2–MeC2
- Fleet numbers: 8101–8104
- Capacity: 1,000 passengers
- Operators: Philippine National Railways
- Depots: Tayuman
- Lines served: Metro Commuter Line (2020–2024)

Specifications
- Car body construction: Stainless steel
- Train length: 82.8 m (271 ft 7 27/32 in)
- Car length: 20.7 m (67 ft 10 61/64 in)
- Width: 2.99 m (9 ft 9 23/32 in)
- Height: 3.83 m (12 ft 6 25/32 in)
- Doors: Double-leaf pocket-type; 3 per side
- Wheelbase: 2.2 m (87 in)
- Maximum speed: 100 km/h (62 mph)
- Weight: 117 t (258,000 lb): 42 t (93,000 lb) (MeC); 37 t (82,000 lb) (TC1); 38 t (84,000 lb) (TC2)
- Prime mover(s): Cummins QSN14
- Engine type: 4-stroke radiator-cooled engine
- Power output: 193–391 kW (259–524 hp)
- Transmission: Diesel–hydraulic
- HVAC: ICOND roof-mounted air conditioning
- Bogies: MB-207 bolsterless (motor); TB-607 (trailer)
- Braking system(s): Knorr-Bremse electro-pneumatic
- Coupling system: AAR/knuckle
- Seating: Longitudinal
- Track gauge: 1,067 mm (3 ft 6 in)

The PNR 8100 class (also known as the INKA DMUs together with PNR 8000 class) is a diesel multiple unit (DMU) train operated by the Philippine National Railways (PNR) since 2020.

== Operational history ==
=== Purchase ===
The PNR received a budget through the 2018 General Appropriations Act for the purchase of trains. On May 28, 2018, four sets of four-car trains were ordered together with three INKA CC300 locomotives and fifteen passenger coaches worth ₱2.5 billion (US$47.4 million).

=== Delivery and commissioning ===
The trains were delivered in two batches. The first batch of trains arrived in February 2020, while the second batch arrived in March 2020. The first batch of on 8100 class DMUs were unveiled on February 14, 2020, and inaugurated on February 20 at the Tutuban station. These underwent 150-hour RAMS validation before it entered revenue service. The tests for the trains have continued and were successful amidst the effects of the COVID-19 pandemic.

Meanwhile, on March 28, 2020, the second batch of two train sets consisting 8 vehicles have been shipped and arrived in the country. The two train sets also underwent RAMS validation tests from May 21 to 31, 2020 before it entered revenue service. It entered revenue service when PNR resumed operations on June 1 when public transport operations resumed upon the lifting of the metropolis' Modified Enhanced Community Quarantine.

From February 2020 to March 2020, the trains serviced the Metro South Commuter line from Tutuban to FTI stations and vice versa, and since June 2020 the trains now service until Alabang stations and vice versa.

They eventually replaced the 8000 class in servicing the Tutuban–Alabang Metro South Commuter (MSC) services, with the 8000 class assigned to the Inter-Provincial Commuter operations in Laguna.

== Design and features ==
The trains were manufactured by the Indonesian firm PT Industri Kereta Api (Persero), also known as INKA. The 8000 and 8100 class DMUs as well as the 8300 class coaches are given the designation K3 while in Indonesia.

=== Car body ===
The design of the 8100 class is identical to the 8000 class DMUs deployed in December 2019 with three double-leaf pocket doors per side and longitudinal seats, with the exception of additional intermediate coaches. The 8100 classes comprises 4 units unlike the earlier 8000 units with just 3.

The livery consists of a white body with a black design in the windows and blue stripes underneath it. The driver cabs, on the other hand, have a black and orange design with the PNR logo underneath the windshield.

=== Interior ===
The INKA DMU train sets has an obstacle door detector that keeps passengers from being caught in between doors with Emergency door release that opens the door manually in case of emergency. The trains are equipped with polycarbonate glass windows that can withstand damages from stoning, four roof-mounted air-conditioning units (each train car has one unit) suitable for the local tropical climate, and an emergency intercom equipped with two-way communication. The trains also feature an LED passenger information system display in each train car.

The design capacity of a four-car trainset is 1,000 passengers.

== Incidents and accidents ==
After the inauguration of the 8100 class, multiple stoning incidents were recorded in February 2020. This happened again after multiple stoning incidents in December 2019 including a stoning incident to the 8000 class that were inaugurated in December 2019. Due to stoning incidents, the INKA DMUs stopped its operations however they were also involved at the stoning incidents.

- On August 28, 2020, an engineer got run over by an 8100 class near Paco station. The engineer died as a result of the incident.

== Gallery ==
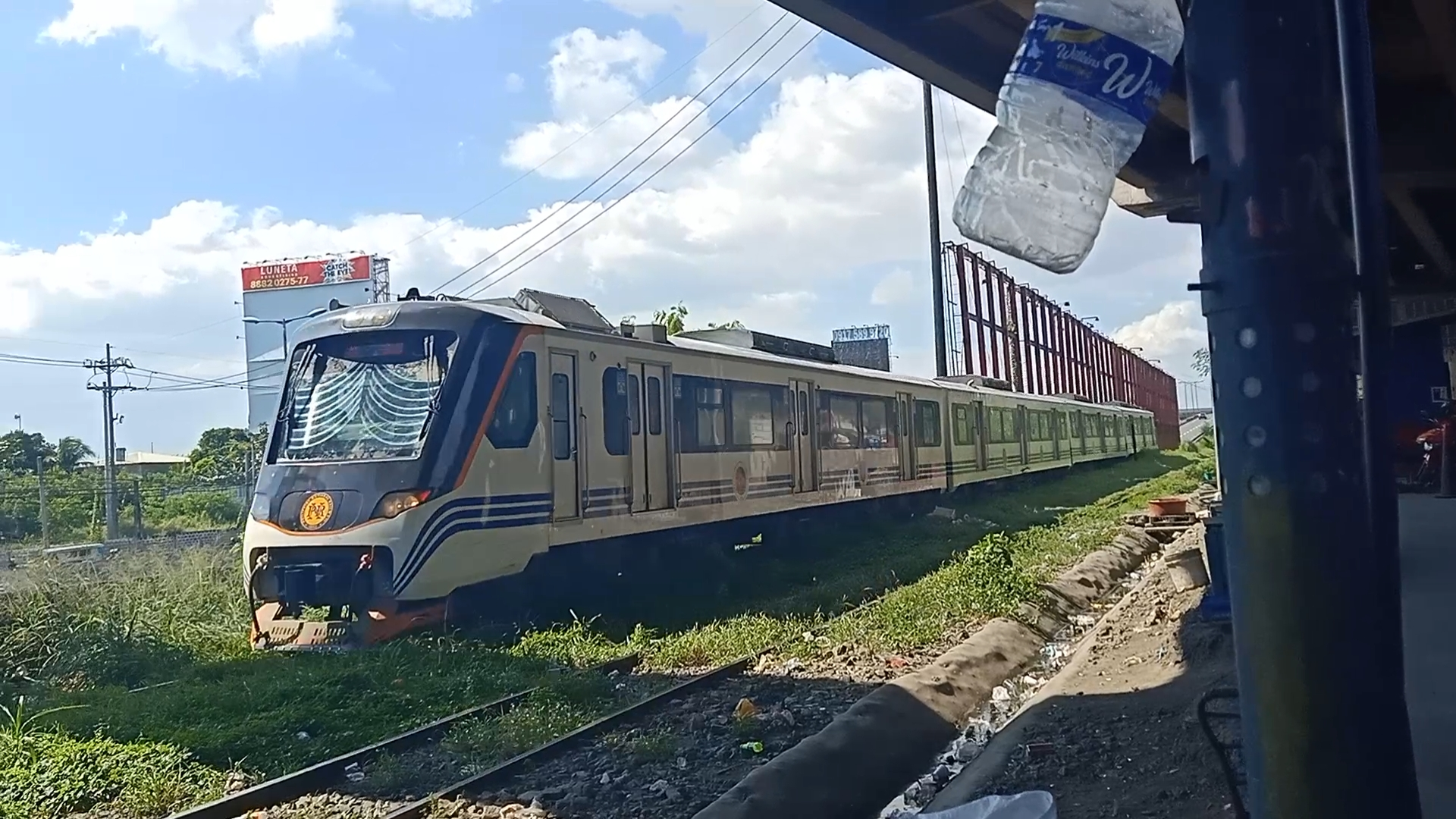
An 8100 class train near FTI station in October 2021.

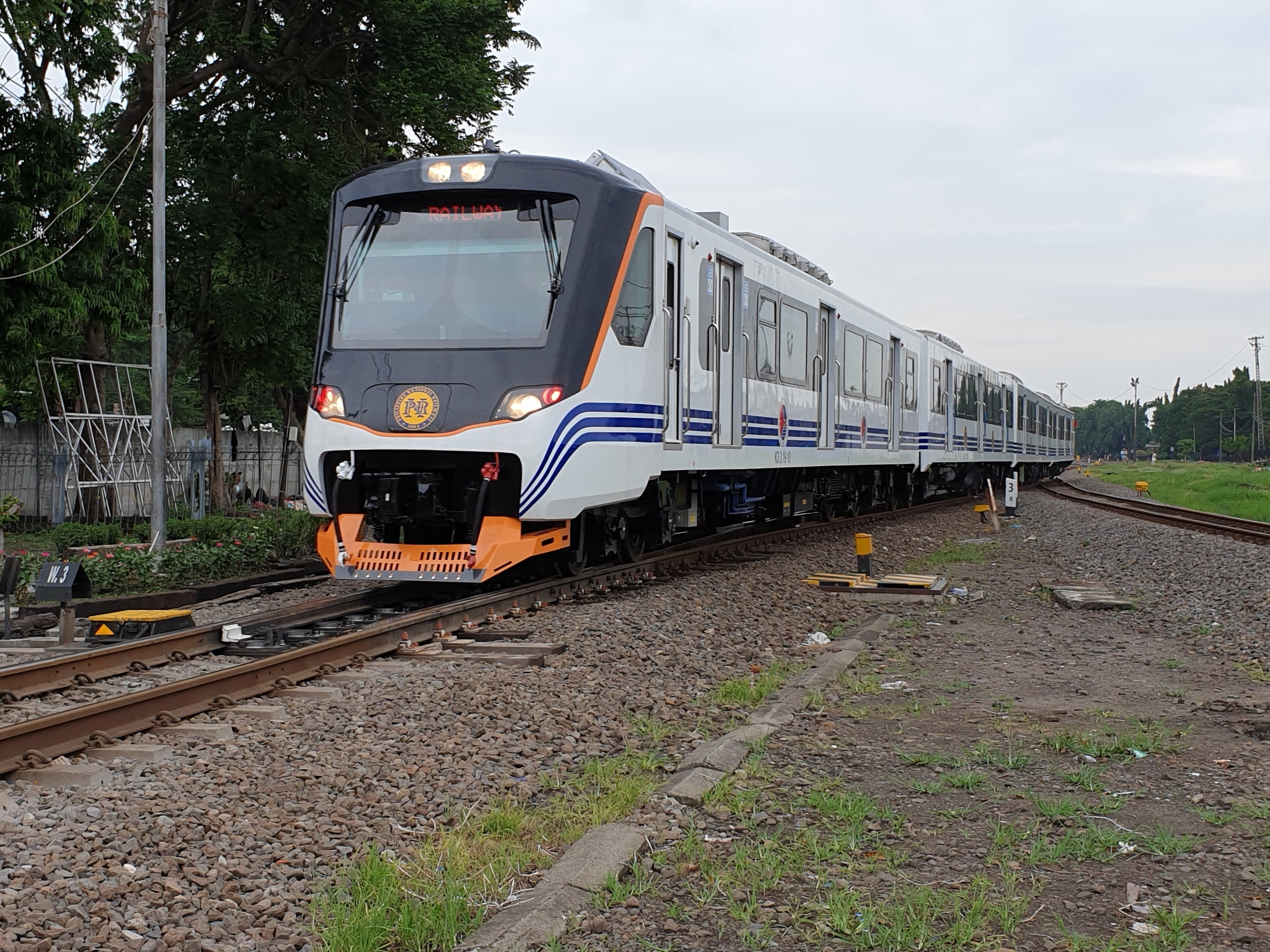
An 8100 class train during its test run in Indonesia in January 2020.

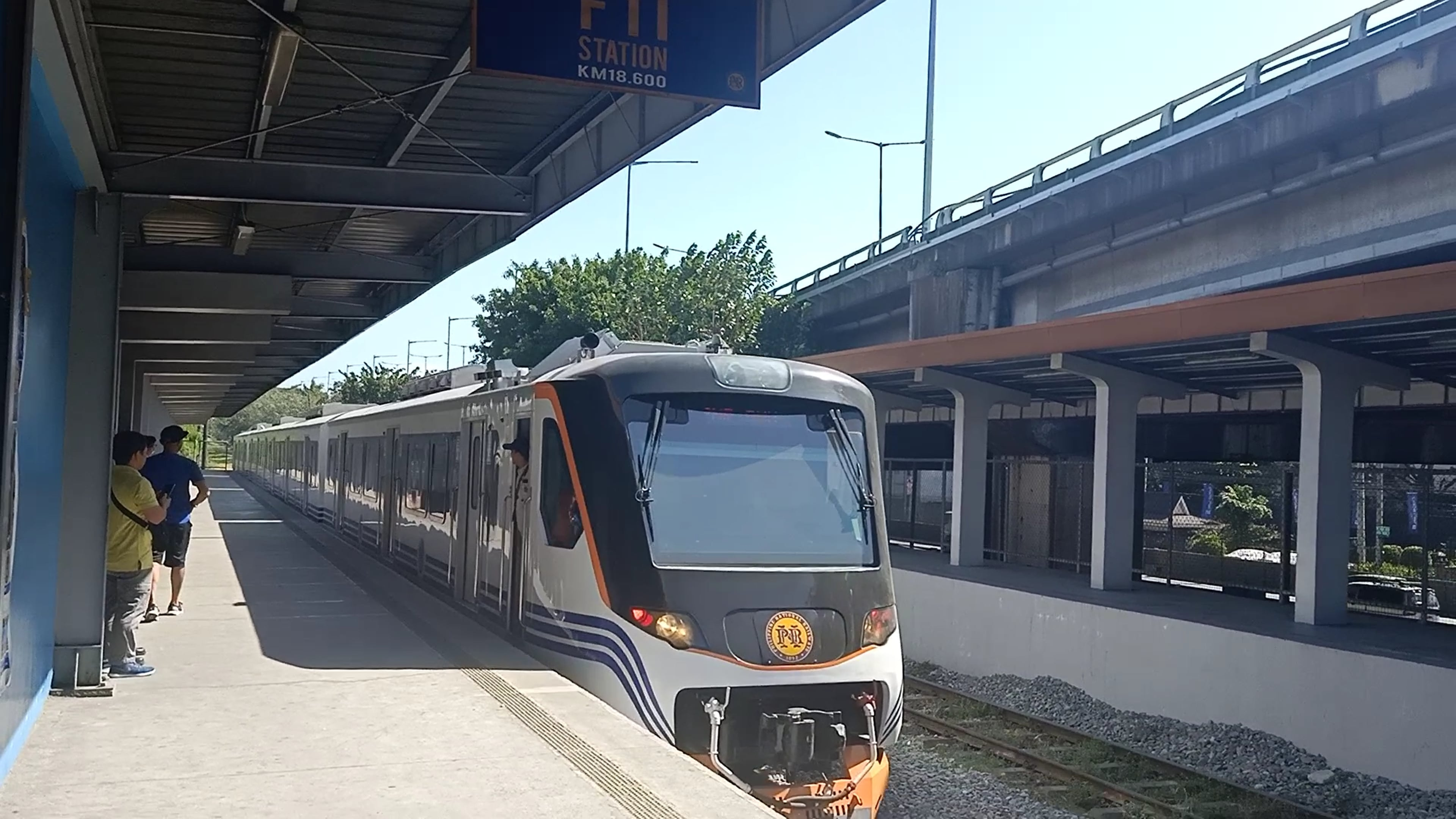
An 8100 class train at FTI station. The northbound cab of the 8100 class is different to the 8000 class due to the positioning of the wires at the cowcatcher.

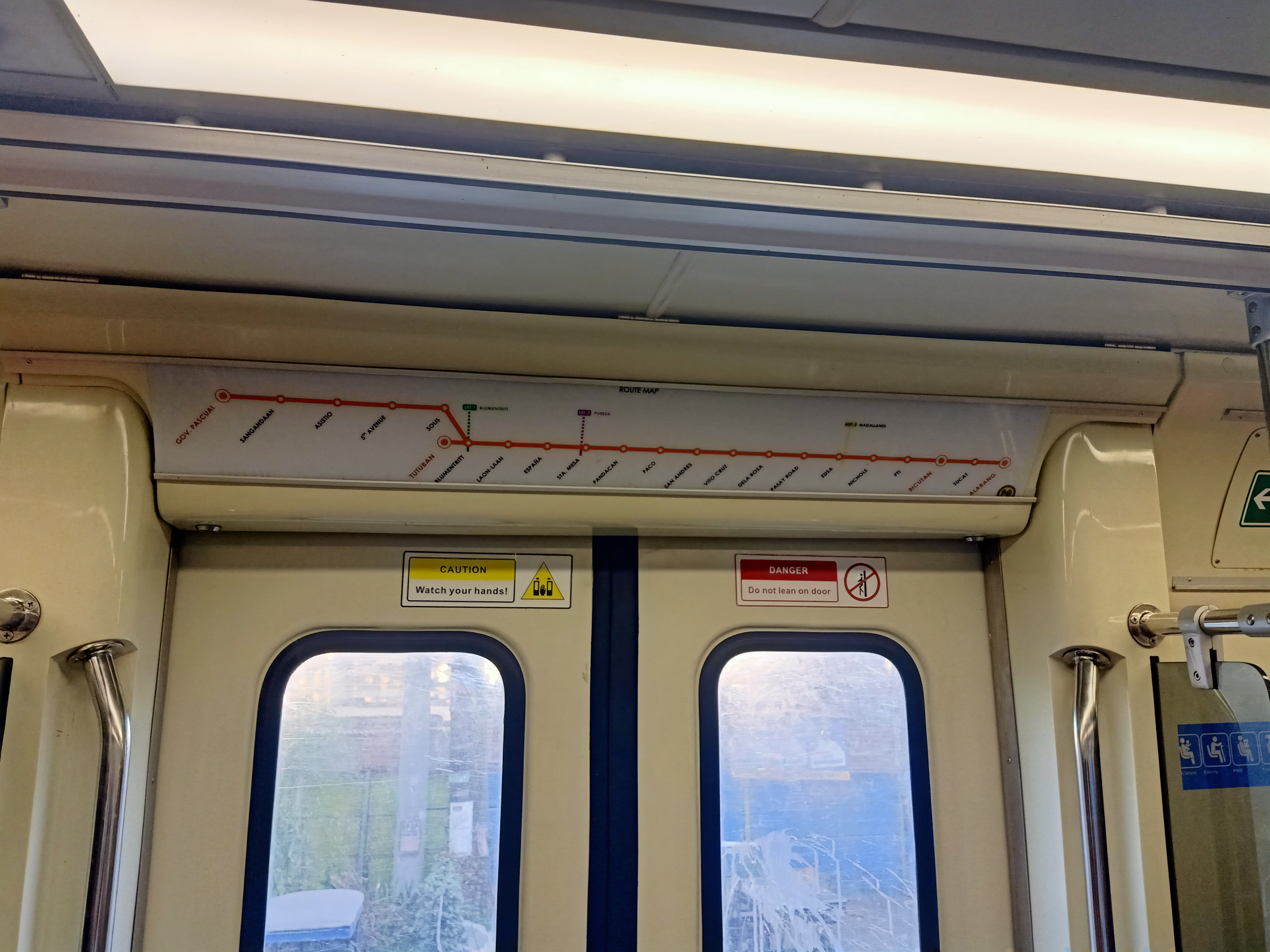
Route map of the PNR Metro Commuter Line inside an 8100 class train.

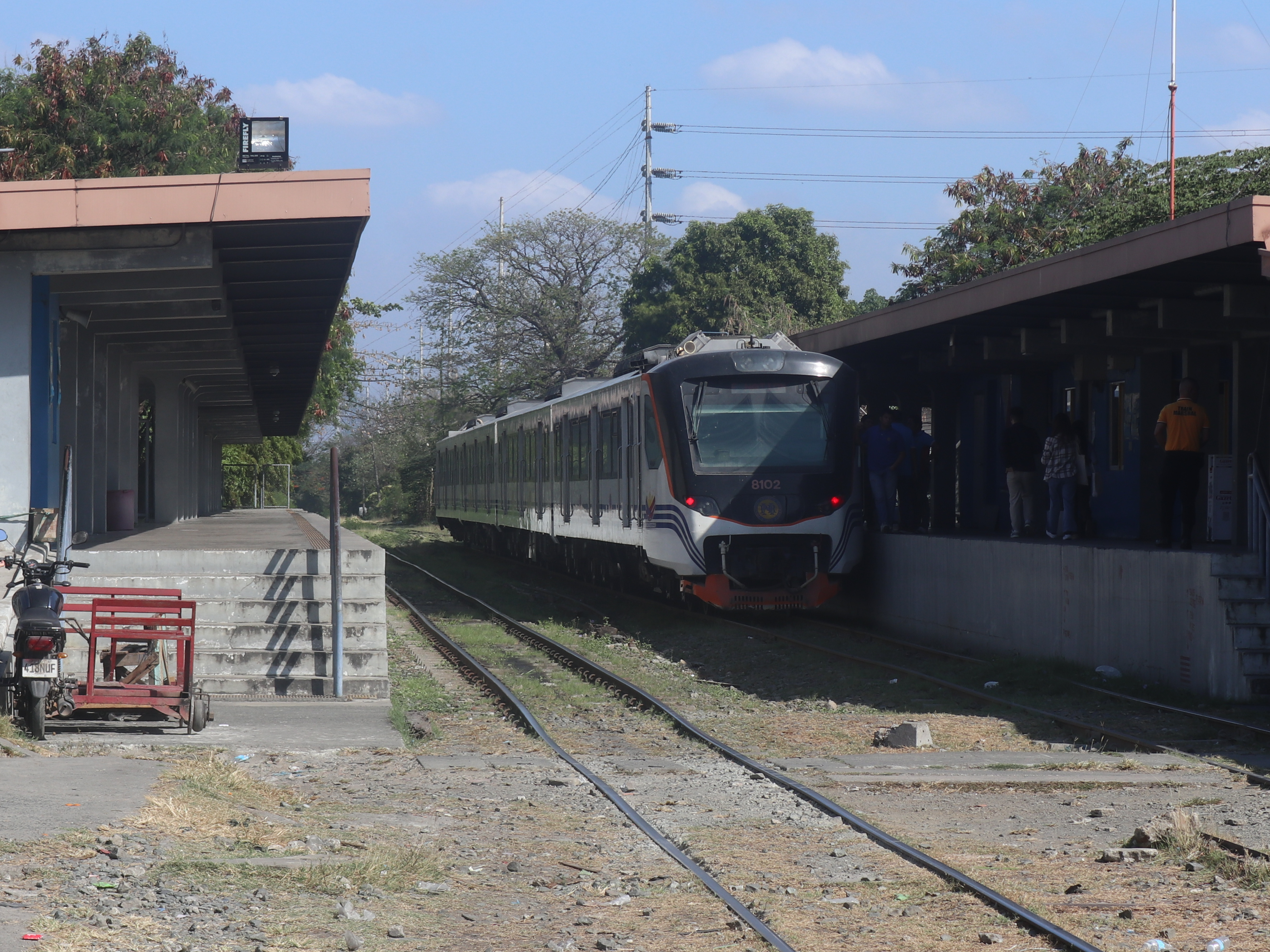
8102 at Bicutan station in March 2024.

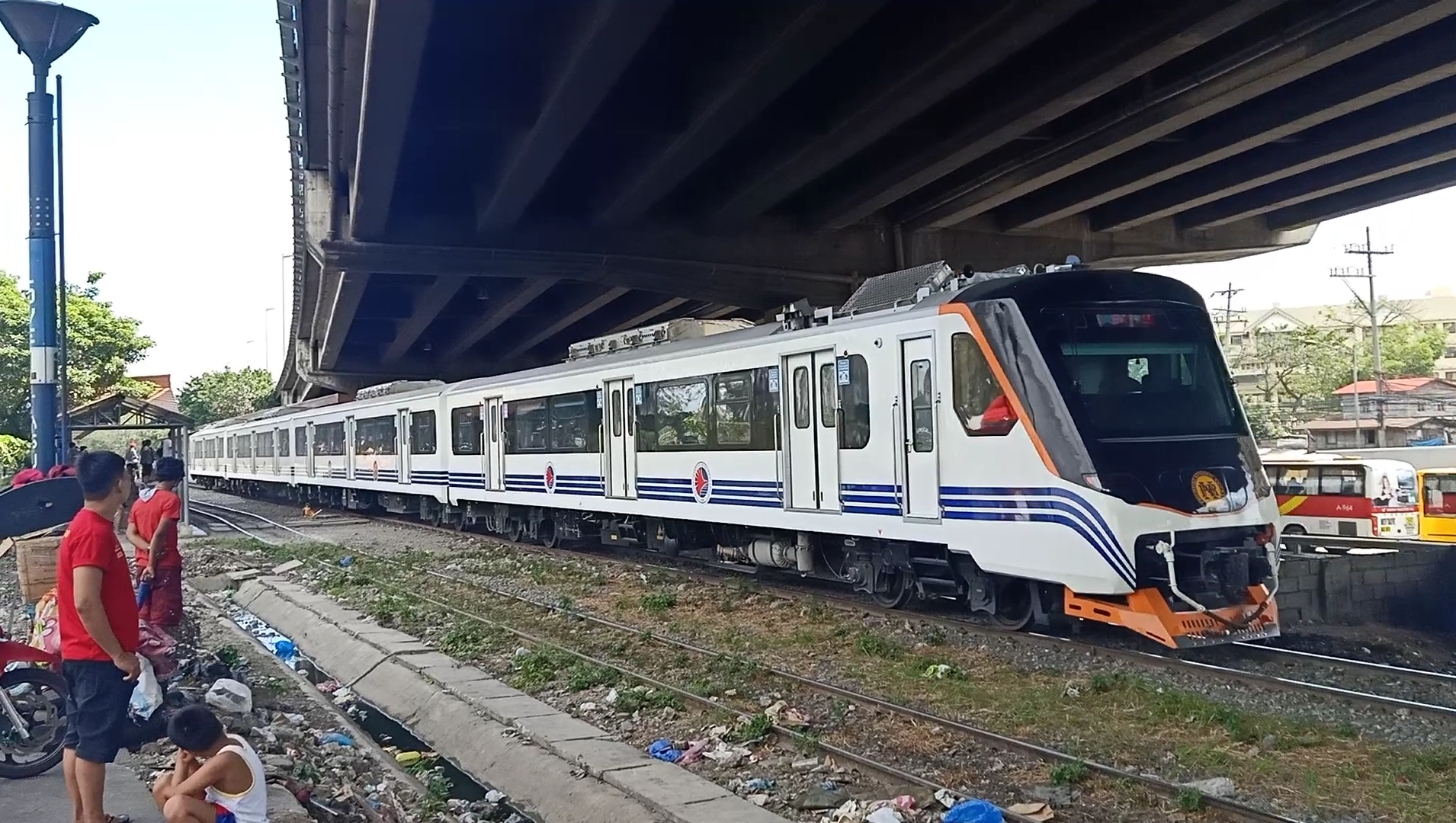
8102 approaching FTI station in February 2020.

== See also ==
- PNR 8000 class
- PNR 8300 class
- INKA CC300
