= PNR EM1000 class =

Philippine train type

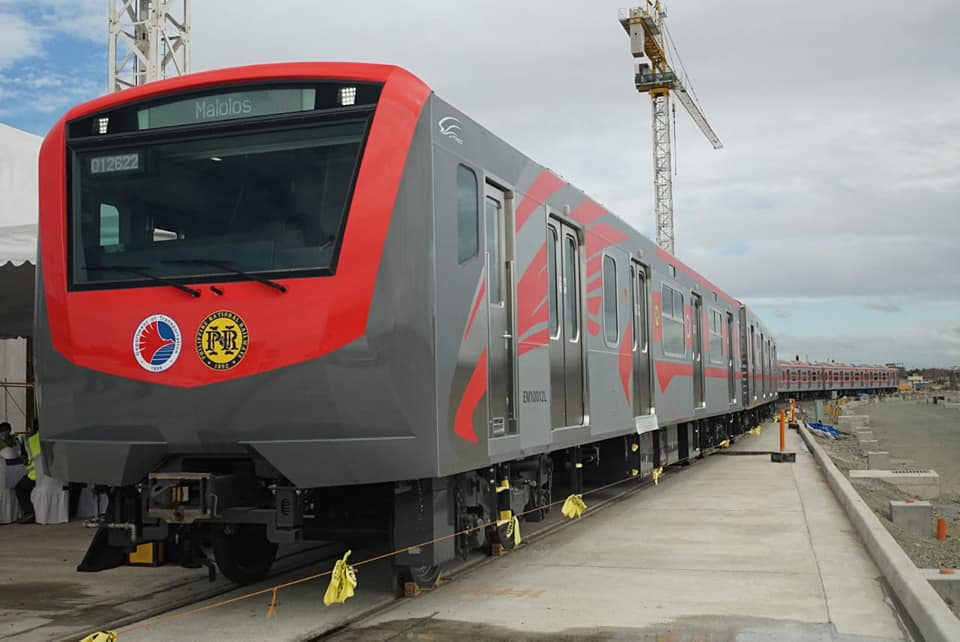
- EM1001, the first trainset at the Malanday depot
- In service: Fiscal 2028 (or until further notice upon opening of partial operation of the NSCR)
- Manufacturer: J-TREC
- Designer: Japan Railway Technical Service
- Order nos.: CP-03 (first batch); NS-02 (second batch)
- Built at: Yokohama, Japan
- Family name: Sustina
- Constructed: 2021–present
- Entered service: TBA
- Number under construction: 392 vehicles (36 sets) (Note: As of October 2026.)
- Number built: 120 vehicles (15 sets)
- Formation: 8 cars per trainset Tc–M–M–T–T–M–M–Tc
- Fleet numbers: 1001–1013 (First Batch) 1101-1138 (Second Batch)
- Capacity: 2,266 with wheelchair spaces
- Operator: Philippine National Railways
- Depots: Malanday, (Note: Main depot) Mabalacat, Banlic
- Line served: North–South Commuter Railway

Specifications
- Car body construction: Lightweight stainless steel
- Train length: 160 m (524 ft 11 3/16 in) (Note: 200 m (656 ft 2 in) for the proposed 10-car variant)
- Car length: 20 m (65 ft 7 3/8 in)
- Width: 2.95 m (9 ft 8 1/8 in)
- Height: 4.15 m (13 ft 7 3/8 in)
- Floor height: 1.15 m (3 ft 9 in)
- Platform height: 1.1 m (3 ft 7 in)
- Entry: Level (Note: Despite the floor height and platform height difference of 50 millimeters (2.0 in).)
- Doors: 4 sets of 1.3 m (51 in) double-leaf pocket doors per side
- Wheel diameter: 860–780 mm (34–31 in) (new–worn)
- Wheelbase: 2.1 m (6 ft 11 in)
- Maximum speed: 120 km/h (75 mph)
- Weight: 270 t (600,000 lb)
- Axle load: 16 t (35,000 lb)
- Steep gradient: 25‰
- Traction system: Mitsubishi Electric IGBT–VVVF (first batch); Hybrid-SiC–VVVF (second batch)
- Traction motors: 16 × 170 kW (230 hp) 3-phase AC induction motor (first batch)
- Power output: 2.72 MW (3,648 hp) (first batch)
- Tractive effort: 420.5 kN (42,880 kgf) (starting); 251 kN (25,600 kgf) (continuous at 50 km/h (31 mph))
- Gear ratio: 6.53:1 (98/15)
- Acceleration: 0.92 m/s^{2} (3.3 km/(h⋅s))
- Deceleration: 1.2 m/s^{2} (4.2 km/(h⋅s)) (service); 1.3 m/s^{2} (4.7 km/(h⋅s)) (emergency)
- Auxiliaries: IGBT static inverter; Low-power DC voltage supply; batteries
- HVAC: Roof-mounted air conditioning
- Electric systems: 1,500 V DC overhead catenary
- Current collection: Single-arm pantograph
- UIC classification: 2′2′+Bo′Bo′+Bo′Bo′+2′2′+2′2′+Bo′Bo′+Bo′Bo′+2′2′
- Wheels driven: 32 out of 64
- Bogies: B15C (Note: Serial number) bolsterless
- Minimum turning radius: 400 m (1,300 ft) on mainline; 92 m (302 ft) on depot
- Braking system: Regenerative
- Safety systems: ATP, ATC, and GSM-R
- Coupling system: Shibata close-contact
- Seating: Longitudinal
- Track gauge: 1,435 mm (4 ft 8 1/2 in) standard gauge

The PNR EM1000 class is an electric multiple unit commuter trainset that will be operated by the Philippine National Railways on the North–South Commuter Railway. Prior to the reveal of its numbering scheme in October 2021, the train was known as the PNR Sustina Commuter. Set to enter service by 2028, it will be PNR's first trainset to be run on standard gauge and powered by electric traction. The trains are also designed to be interoperable with the Metro Manila Subway.

== Background ==
=== Tokyu Car's involvement in the Philippines ===
Tokyu Car Corporation (Note: Predecessor to J-TREC and bore the Wasei-eigo form Co., Ltd. as a translation of Kabushiki gaisha during the 1950s.) once constructed diesel multiple units and locomotive-hauled cars for the Manila Railroad Company and its succeeding incarnation, the Philippine National Railways. The company first built twenty JMC class DMUs alongside Mitsubishi Heavy Industries for its short-range services in 1955 as part of Manila Railroad's efforts towards dieselization. In 1968, a daily commuter service to San Fernando, Pampanga was launched, using the MC-300 cars also built by Tokyu.

A second batch of 24 CMC class railcars were ordered for the expanded Metro Manila Commuter Service to Angeles City. The trainsets arrived in batches between 1974 and 1976. By the mid and late 1980s, long-haul commuter services such as those leading to Pampanga were cut due to a lack of funding, political instability, and a government debt crisis.

The CMC and JMC were then retired from service in 2004 after being replaced by ex-JNR 12 and 14-series locomotive-hauled coaches, referred to as the 7A-2000 class.

=== PNR electrification plans ===
Numerous plans to electrify the PNR network have been made since 1978, most notably the discontinued Northrail project which would have used the European 25 kV AC railway electrification standard. It was cancelled in 2011 due to alleged overpricing and reports of anomalous deals. The Northrail project was then revived in the late 2010s as the North–South Commuter Railway but now uses the Japanese 1,500 V DC electrification standard.

=== Development ===
The Japan Railway Technical Service (JARTS) (Note: Japanese: 海外鉄道技術協力協会, romanized: Kaigai Tetsudō Gijutsu Kyōryoku Kyōkai, lit. 'Overseas Railway Technical Cooperation Association') developed the STRASYA standard in 2004. It is an acronym for Standard Urban Railway System for Asia and are Japanese-built trains exported for use by other Asian countries. It uses a standardized rolling stock gauge of 20 meters (65 ft 7 in) long with couplers, 2.95 meters (9 ft 8 in) wide, and 3.65 meters (12 ft 0 in) tall without a pantograph. Meanwhile, the newly-formed Japan Transport Engineering Company introduced the Sustina platform at InnoTrans 2012. This was shortly after Tokyu Car was reorganized and renamed as a result of its acquisition by the East Japan Railway Company. Its main distinction from other commuter train families is that the trainsets are constructed with lightweight stainless steel manufacturing technology patented by J-TREC.

The National Economic and Development Authority has then required all new railroad projects to use standard-gauge track in 2016. The North–South Commuter Railway, successor to the Manila–Clark rapid railway and Northrail projects, was announced the following year as a mostly elevated mainline.

== Operational history ==
=== Purchase ===
The Department of Transportation (DOTr) opened a bidding in July 2018 for the purchase of 104 electric railcars, equivalent to thirteen 8-car trainsets for Phase 1 (Tutuban–Malolos segment) of the NSCR. The joint venture of Sumitomo Corporation and Japan Transport Engineering Company (J-TREC) was awarded the ₱12.1 billion contract on July 2, 2019, and the contract was signed on July 16. The trains were purchased under Contract Package CP 03.

Thirty-eight more eight-car trainsets (304 railcars) were procured under Contract Package CP NS-02 for Phases 2 (Malolos–Clark segment) and 3 (Solis–Calamba segment) of NSCR. The DOTr opened the bidding for the additional trains in September 2020. Sumitomo and J-TREC were again awarded on January 14, 2022; the contract was signed on March 18.

=== Production and delivery ===
The Department of Transportation unveiled pictures of the trainsets under production on May 15, 2021, with the completion of the first B15C bogies. The first trainset was finished on October 7, 2021. Delivery started on October 18, with each car being carried by semi-trailer trucks to the Port of Yokohama. The remaining 49 trainsets are still under production at the company's main facility in Yokohama until September 2028.

The first train arrived at the Port of Manila on November 21, 2021, two weeks ahead of the schedule set by the DOTr. This first trainset was unveiled on March 18, 2022. During this stage, the trains will be initially stored at the Malanday yards. It will then be subjected to testing before the commencement of regular operations on the Tutuban–Malolos segment (Phase 1) by 2027.

Once operational, it will be used for both Commuter and Commuter Express services. Three routes were planned in 2018: Tutuban–New Clark City; Clark International Airport–Calamba; and Tutuban–Calamba.

== Specifications ==
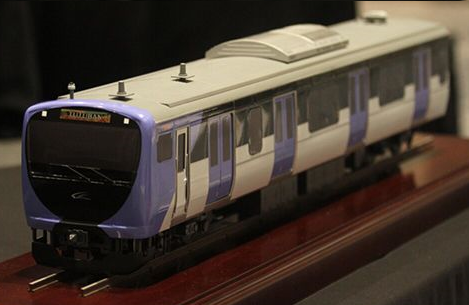
A 2019 scale model of the train. The model featured a blue livery, which was changed to a different design with a red-orange color.

The EM1000 class' design is part of the larger Sustina (trademarked in all-lower case format) family of electric trainsets and is largely based on the Sustina Commuter design. These sets in particular are based on existing Japanese designs such as East Japan Railway Company's E233 series and E235 series, the latter being another derivative of the sustina platform. The design has also been adopted to standard-gauge track, as with the variant operated by Bangkok's Purple Line. Each train is composed of 8 cars, expandable to 10. At its base form, it is roughly twice the length of the 4-car trainset of the LRT2's LRTA 2000 class, its nearest counterpart in Metro Manila. The overall train length is at 160 meters (524 ft 11 in) for 8-car models and 200 meters (656 ft 2 in) for the 10-car expanded set.

The class also adopted a new red-orange livery, having been revised from a bluish-purple livery adopted for the original proposal in 2019. This is after the DOTr unveiled the driver's cab of the units on June 28, 2021. They also feature eagle design highlights on the sides of the train.

Overall, the tare weight of the trainsets are at 270 metric tons (600,000 lb).

=== Mechanical ===
The bogies will be different from the DT and TR series used in Japan due to a difference in track gauges. The bogies will be of bolsterless type. One of the bogies appear to carry the serial number B15C according to images obtained by the Philippine Railway Historical Society.

During the design stage, the trainsets were set to use American Tightlock coupling (Type H) according to design documents. The coupling system was later changed to Shibata close-contact after the first trainset was unveiled.

=== Electrical ===
The trains will use 1,500 V DC power through overhead lines, making the electrification system standards the same as Japan, and the same as the Metro Manila Subway. All motor cars will have a single-arm pantograph in each car. While the main source of traction are variable-voltage/variable-frequency drive (VVVF) inverters driving the AC motors, batteries and auxiliary power consisting of static inverters will also be used to power the train's lighting and controls as well as allowances for moving slowly (at c. 30 km/h (19 mph)) in case of an emergency before coming to a complete stop. The electrical components are required to be tropicalized and would have insulation requirements following IEC 60085 Thermal class 200 specifications. The acceleration is set at 0.92 m/s^{2} (3.3 km/(h⋅s)), while service braking deceleration is at 1.2 m/s^{2} (4.2 km/(h⋅s)) and emergency braking deceleration is at 1.3 m/s^{2} (4.7 km/(h⋅s)) per second.

=== Signalling and safety equipment ===
The trains will adopt ETCS Level 2 for signalling and train control which combines Eurobalise with the GSM-R communication system. Although the adoption of ETCS will allow the NSCR to operate at 160 km/h (99 mph) under heavy traffic, the commuter trains themselves are limited to a maximum speed of 120 km/h (75 mph). Allowances have been considered for the future adoption of automatic train operation (ATO). Lastly, station platforms will have platform screen doors which will only open after the train doors do the same for safe boarding. Boarding time on the trainsets will be limited to 30 seconds.

The ETCS equipment packages first underwent a non-competitive bidding as procurement and direct contracting. In August 2021, the Department of Transportation tapped Hitachi Rail STS, an Italy-based subsidiary of Japanese manufacturer Hitachi and formerly Ansaldo STS, to supply the signalling and communications systems for the 38-kilometer (24 mi) NSCR section between Tutuban and Malolos.

=== Interior ===
The design capacity for an 8-car trainset is 2,266 passengers with 2,242 being regular seats and standees and another 24 wheelchair spaces. Meanwhile, a future expanded 10-car variant will have 2,656 standing and regular seated passengers. Seating capacity will be different for lead and intermediate cars. Lead cars at each end of the train will have 211 standing passengers, 45 seated and 3 wheelchair spaces for a total of 269 passengers per car. Meanwhile, intermediate cars will have 231 standing, 54 seated and 3 wheelchair spaces for a total of 288 passengers per car. All seats will be of a single class and there will be no Green Class-style bilevel cars used by its Japanese counterparts. There are priority seats and wheelchair spaces on the train as per Japanese standards. However, unlike the Airport Express trains, there are no toilets on board.

Each car also has eight electrically-driven bi-parting pocket doors that have a width of 1.3 meters (4 ft 3 in) and height of 1.85 meters (6 ft 1 in). For end cars, an additional pair of single-type pocket doors will be installed on the car cabs.

The trains will feature LCD screens above the doors which displays the NSCR line map and the car number.

=== Formation ===
Cars of EM1000 class
Car type		Tc	M	T
Quantity		2	4	2
Control cab		Yes	No	No
Motor		No	Yes	No
VVVF inverter		No	Yes	No
Pantograph		No	Yes	No
Car length	m	20		
Car length	ft in	65 ft 7.4 in		

	← Northbound Southbound →							
Car No.	1	2	3	4	5	6	7	8
Designation	Tc	M1A	M2A	T	T	M1B	M2B	Tc'
Numbering (Note: The xx refers to the variable digits.)	EM10xx1L	EM10xx1M	EM10xx2M	EM10xx1T	EM10xx2T	EM10xx3M	EM10xx4M	EM10xx2L
Seated	45	54	54	54	54	54	54	45
Standing	211	231	231	231	231	231	231	211
Wheelchair spaces	1	2	2	2	2	2	2	1
Total	269	288	288	288	288	288	288	269

The following are the definitions of the three-letter designation system.

- L refers to the lead car or control car. The Japanese equivalent for this type is KuHa (クハ).
- M refers to a powered intermediate car. According to bidding documents, all motor cars have its own pantograph. Its Japanese equivalent is MoHa (モハ).
- T refers to an unpowered intermediate (trailer) car. Its Japanese equivalent is SaHa (サハ).
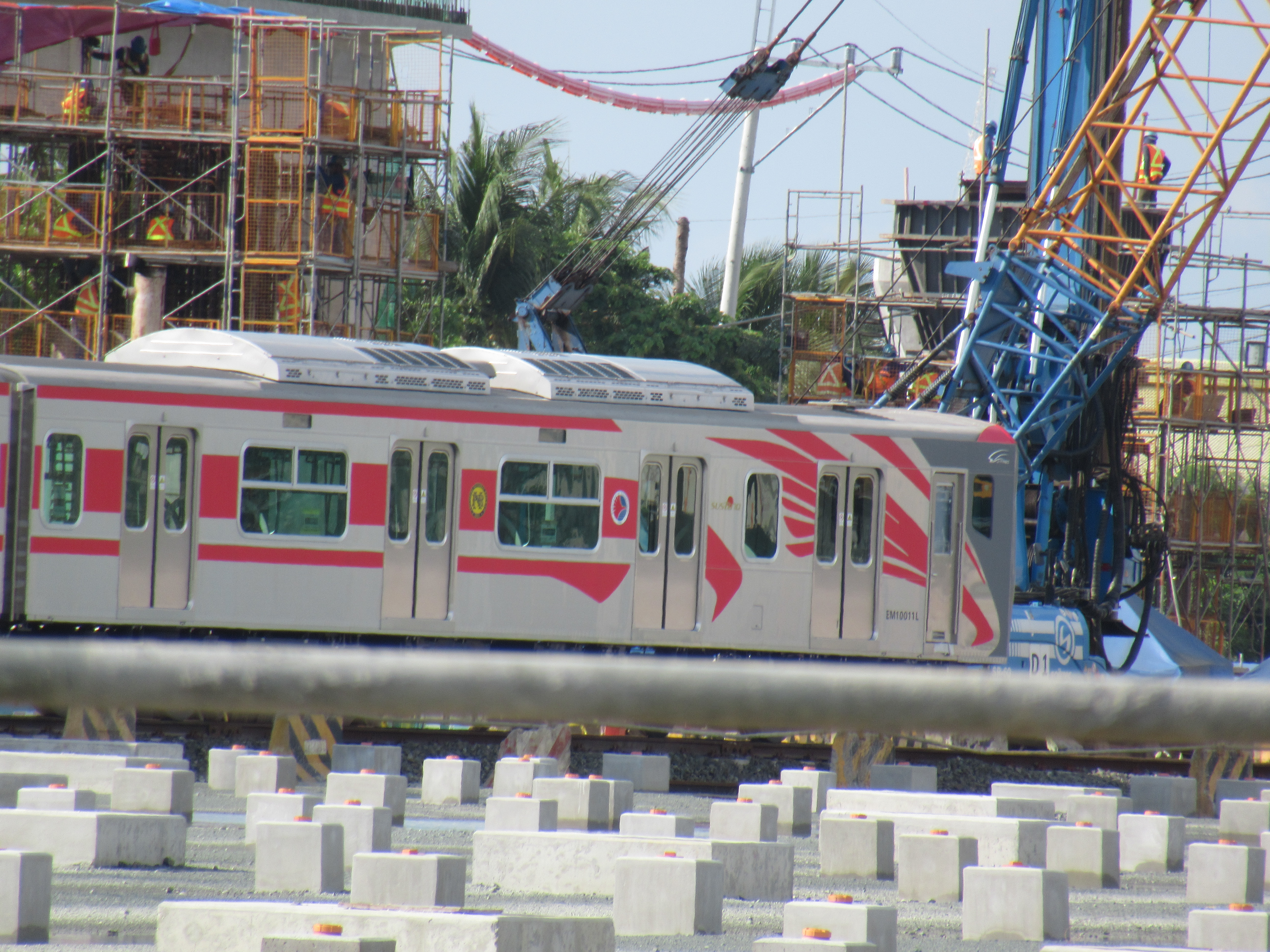
EM10xx1L (car 1)

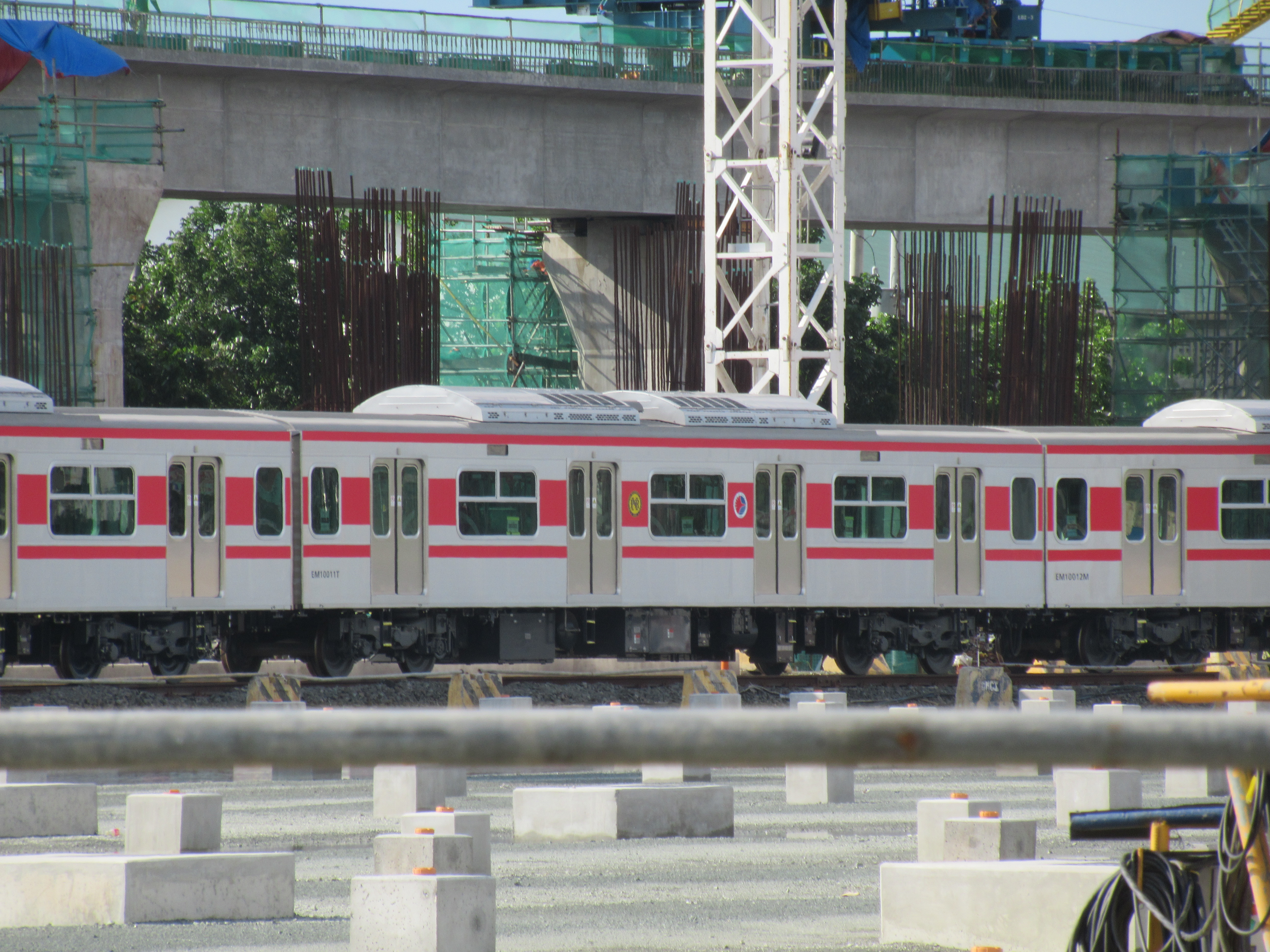
EM10xx1T (car 4)

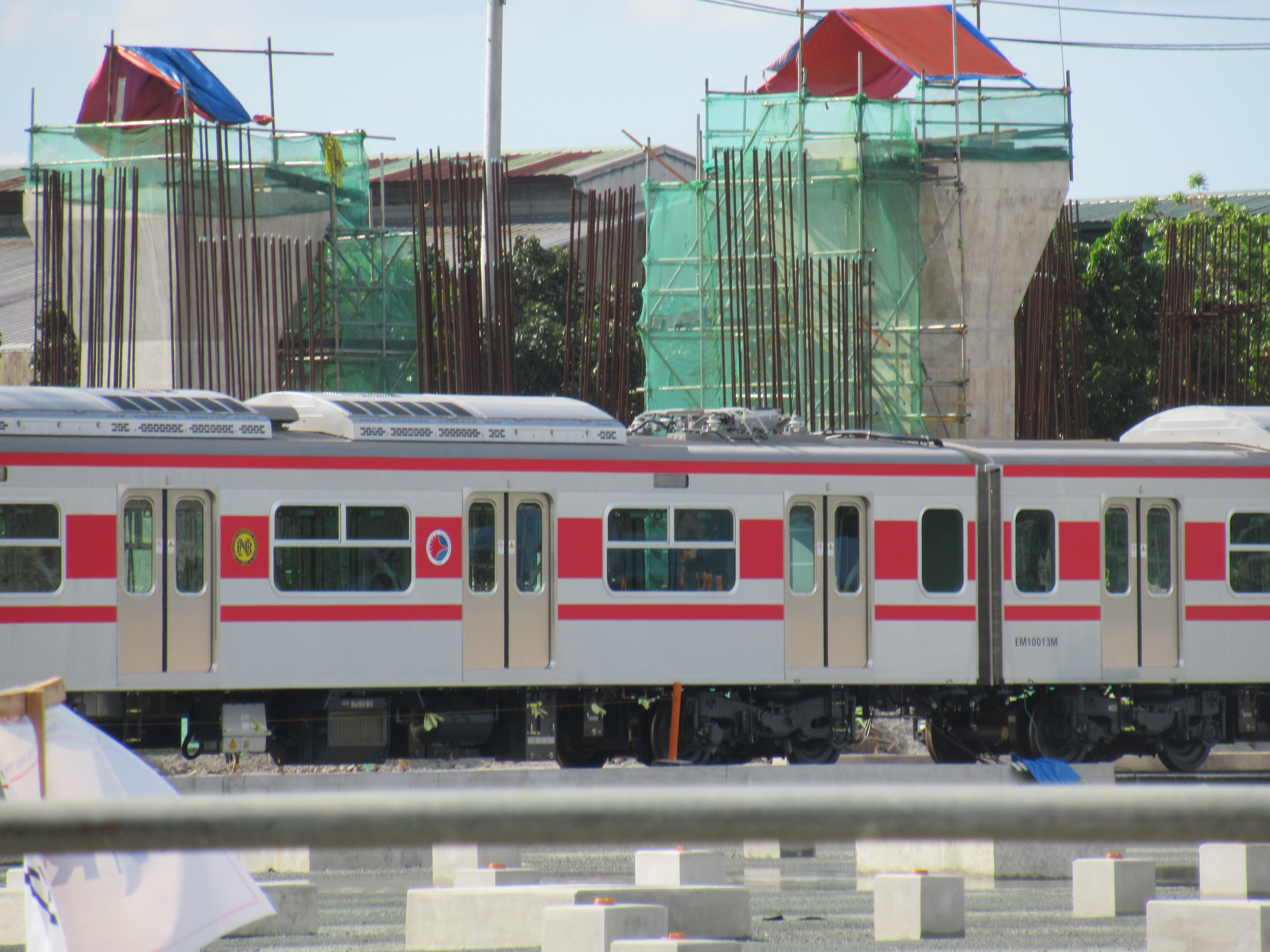
EM10xx4M (car 7)

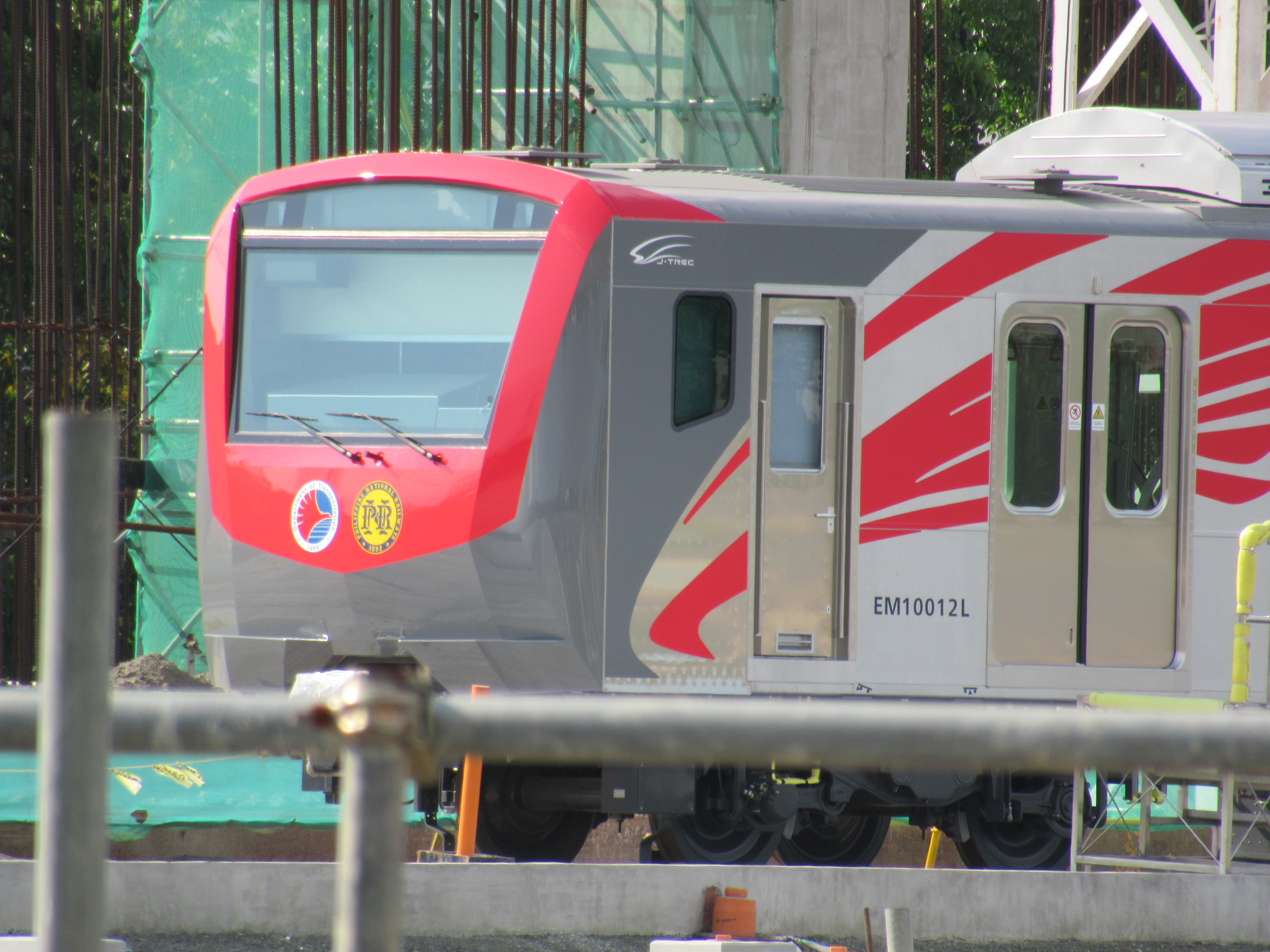
EM10xx2L (car 8)

== See also ==
- E233 series – Japanese narrow-gauge commuter trainsets in which the EM1000 design is derived from.
- E235 series – Another narrow-gauge commuter design belonging to the same Sustina family, from which the sides of the EM1000 trains is derived.
- MRTJ 1000 series – Indonesian narrow-gauge variant of the STRASYA for the Jakarta MRT.
