= Unladen weight =

Unladen weight may refer to:

- curb weight
- Tare weight
