= Strong Republic =

Strong Republic may refer to:

- Strong Republic (Tagalog: Matatag Na Republika), a slogan used in the Philippines during the presidency of Gloria Macapagal Arroyo
- Strong Republic (Lebanon), a bloc among the members of the 2018–22 Lebanese Parliament

== See also ==
- Strong Republic Transit System, a public transit project in Manila, Philippines
- Strong Republic Nautical Highway, an integrated network of highway and vehicular ferry routes in the Philippines
