= Tret =

Tret may refer to:

== Places ==
- Tret, Murree, Pakistan
- Tret, a subdivision of Fondo, Italy

== Other uses ==
- Trett, or tret, an archaic allowance from the gross weight of goods
- Alpha,alpha-trehalose synthase, or TreT, an enzyme

== See also ==
- Trets, Provence-Alpes-Côtes d’Azur, France
