= KiHa 52 =

Japanese train type

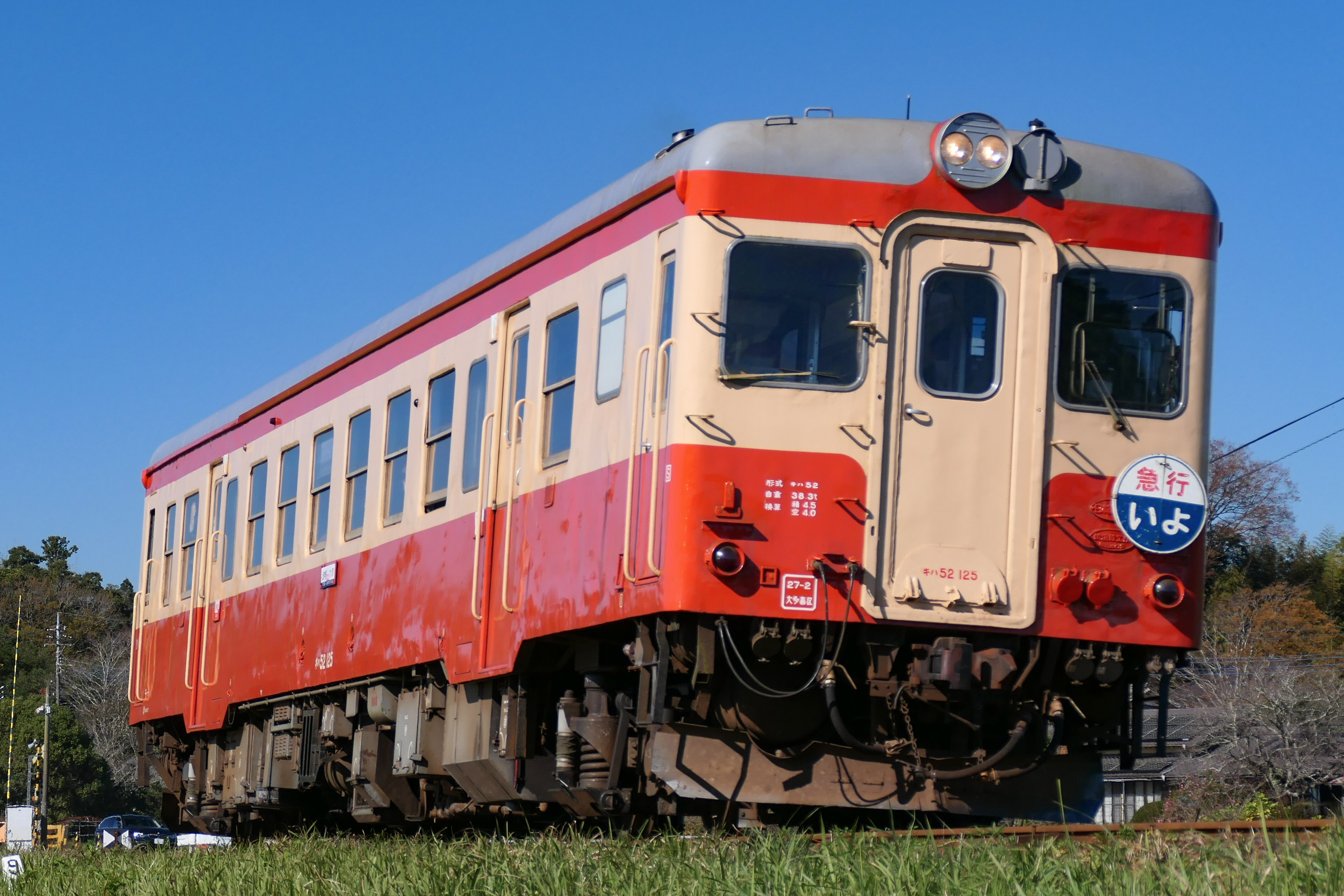
- KiHa 52 in old JNR two tone vermilion and beige livery
- In service: 1958–present
- Constructed: 1957–1966
- Refurbished: 2020-2021 (PNR)
- Number built: 112 vehicles
- Number in service: 1 vehicle in Japan; 2 vehicles in Myanmar (as of 2020); 1 vehicle in the Philippines (as of 2020)
- Number preserved: 3 (KiHa 52-115; 52-130; 52-156)
- Number scrapped: 105 vehicles
- Successor: KiHa 120 (JR East); PNR 8000 class (PNR)
- Formation: 1/2/3 cars
- Fleet numbers: KiHa 52 1 - 56; KiHa 52 101 - 156
- Capacity: 88
- Operators: JNR (1958–1987); JR East (1987–2010); JR West (1987–2010); JR Shikoku (1987–1990); JR Kyushu (1987–2002); Myanmar Railways (2007–2016; 2020-present); Isumi Railway (2011–present); PNR (2012–2020; 2021–present as a rescue train) (Note: Relegated to work train in 2021.)
- Depots: Tutuban, Naga (PNR)
- Lines served: PNR Metro Commuter Line; PNR South Main Line; Isumi line

Specifications
- Car body construction: Steel
- Car length: 21,300 mm (69 ft 11 in)
- Width: 2,928 mm (9 ft 7.3 in)
- Height: 3,925 mm (12 ft 10.5 in)
- Entry: Step
- Doors: 2 single-leaf sliding doors per side
- Weight: 35.5–36.6 t (34.9–36.0 long tons; 39.1–40.3 short tons)
- Prime mover: DMH17C/H
- Engine type: Diesel
- Power output: 2 x 180 hp (130 kW)
- Bogies: DT22
- Coupling system: AAR coupler
- Multiple working: Various DMUs in Japan; PNR 900 Class
- Track gauge: 1,067 mm (3 ft 6 in); 1,000 mm (3 ft 3 3/8 in) metre gauge (Myanmar)

The KiHa 52 (キハ52形, Kiha-gojūni-gata) is a Japanese diesel multiple unit (DMU) type formerly operated by Japanese National Railways (JNR); JR Group companies such as JR East, JR West, JR Shikoku & JR Kyushu; and later by the private railway operator Isumi Railway based in Chiba, Japan, by overseas operators such as Myanmar Railways in Myanmar, and the Philippine National Railways in the Philippines.

The "KiHa" designation derives from the classification system used by JNR. "Ki" indicates a diesel-powered vehicle, while "Ha" indicates an ordinary passenger car, as opposed to a green car.

112 KiHa 52 cars were built for Japanese National Railways between 1958 and 1966. The design was based on the KiHa 20 series "general purpose" DMU type, but with two engines for use on mountainous lines.

== Variants ==
- KiHa 52 1 – 56: Built 1958–1962
- KiHa 52 101 – 156: Built 1963–1966
- KiHa 52 651: Converted from KiHa 52 101

== Livery variations ==
=== JNR-era liveries ===
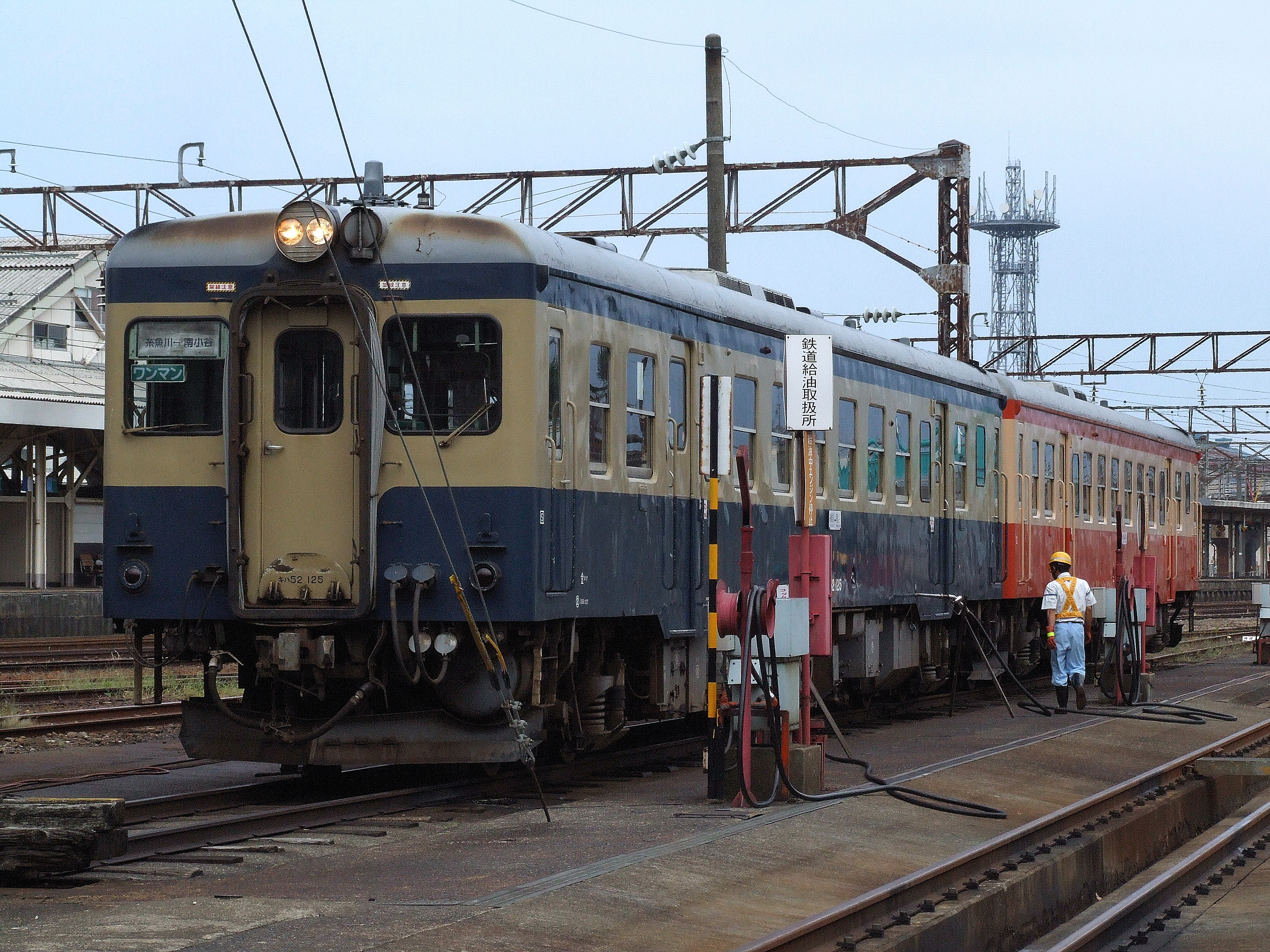
Two JR-West KiHa 52 cars in original JNR two-tone liveries in September 2008

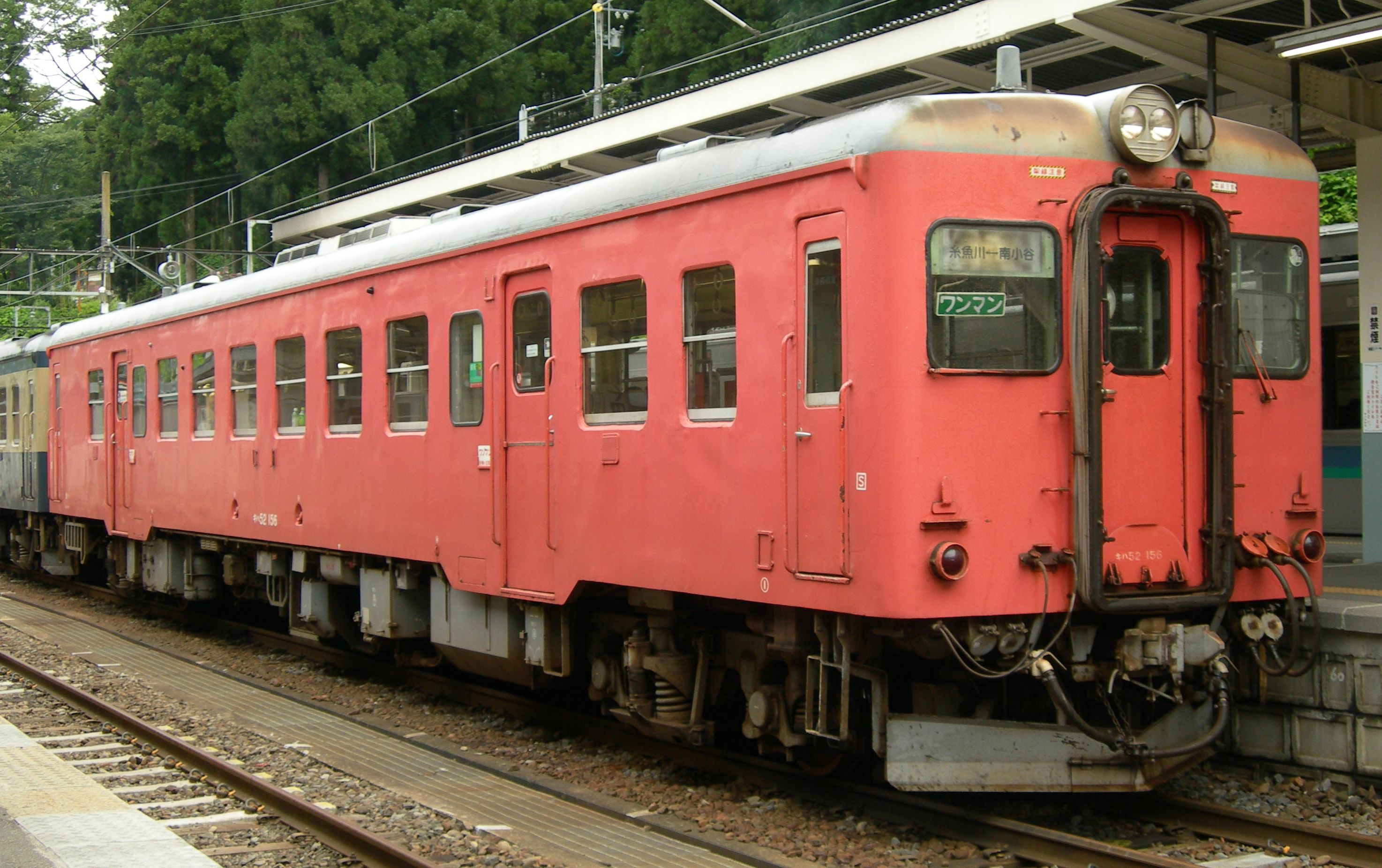
KiHa 52 156 in "metropolitan" all-over red livery in August 2009

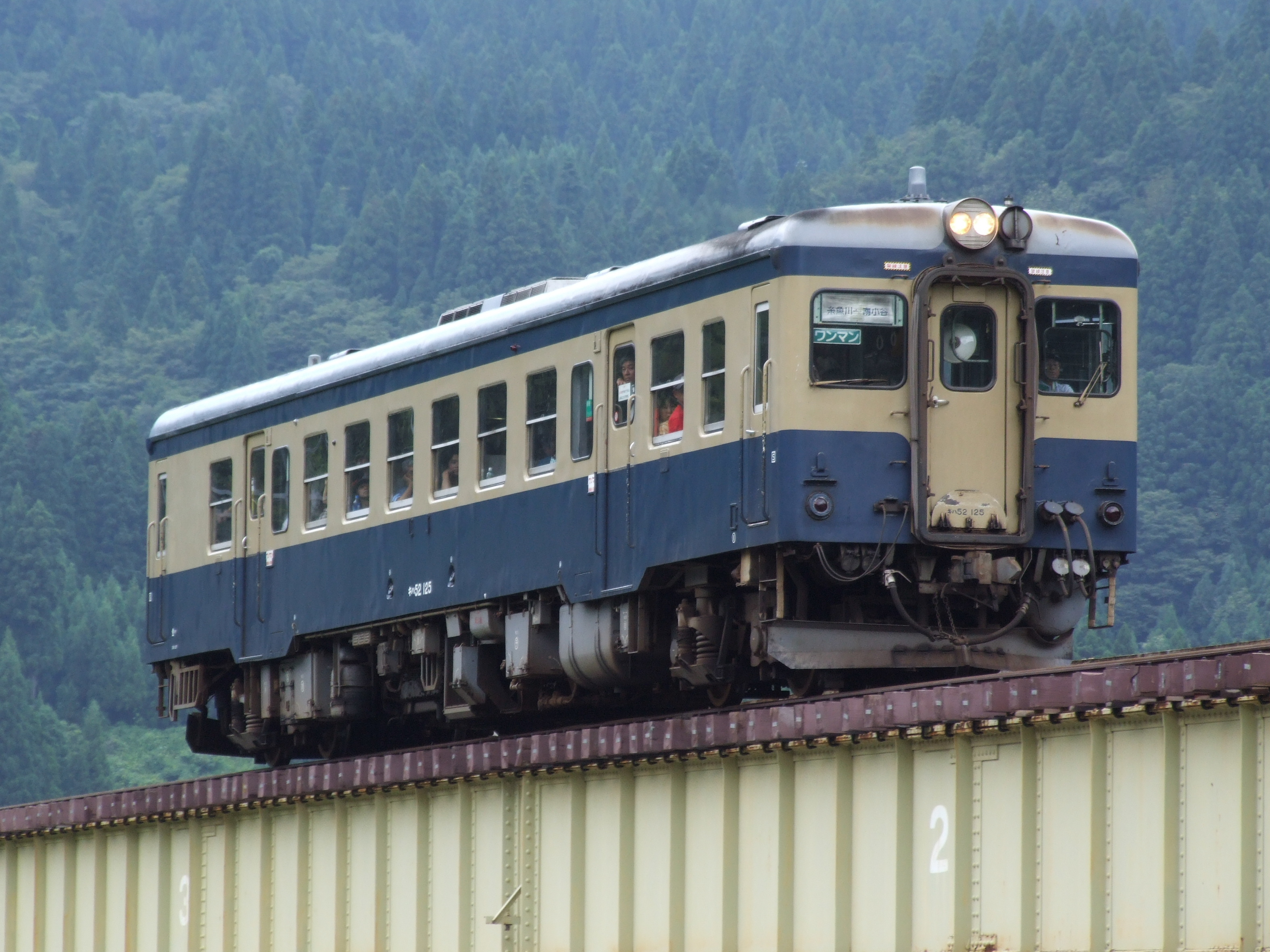
KiHa 52 125 in JNR two-tone blue & beige livery in August 2008

=== JR-era regional liveries ===
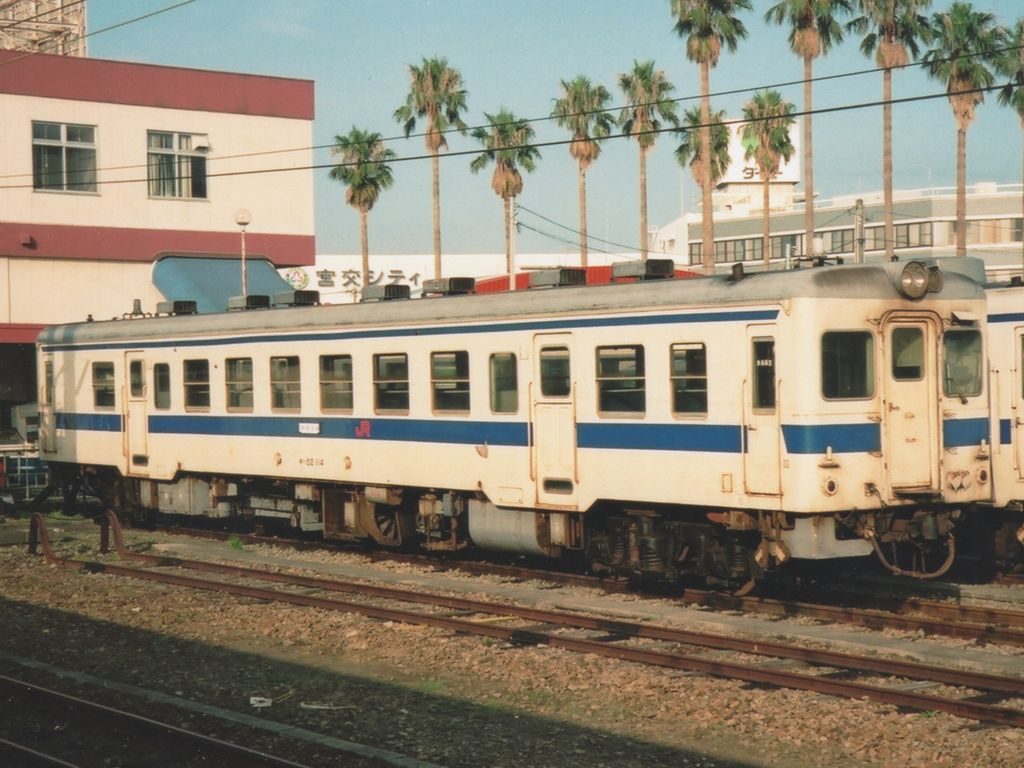
KiHa 52 114 in JR Kyushu livery in August 1993

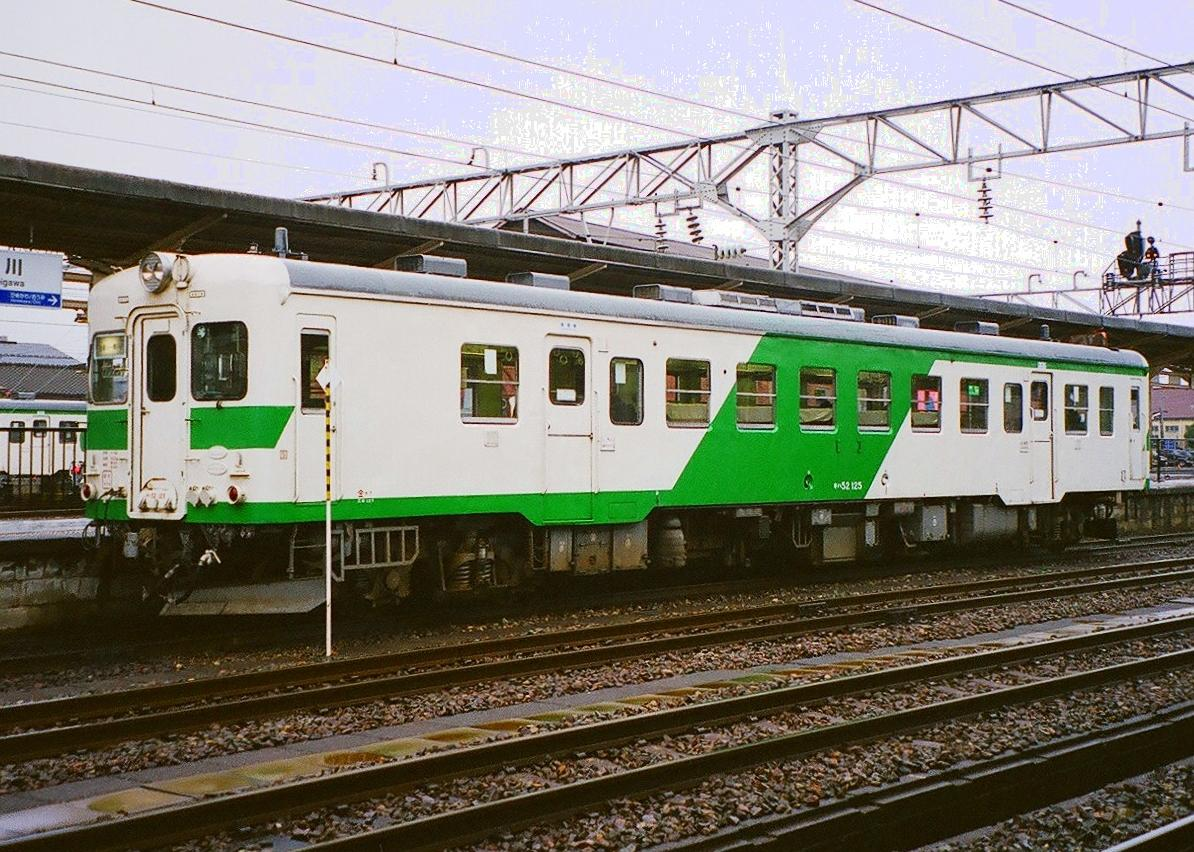
KiHa 52 125 in "Oito Line" livery in December 1999

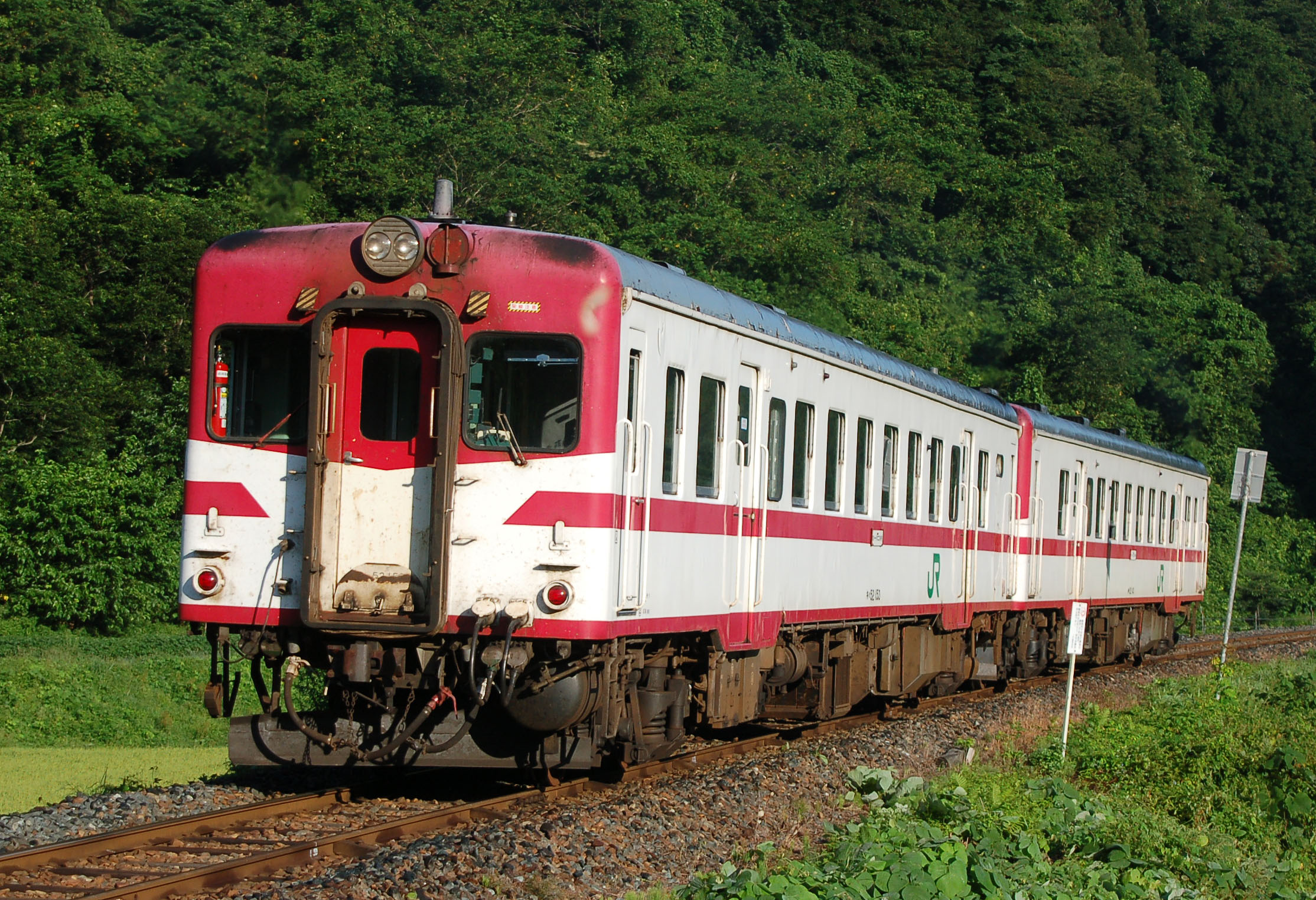
JR East KiHa 52s in "Morioka" livery in August 2006

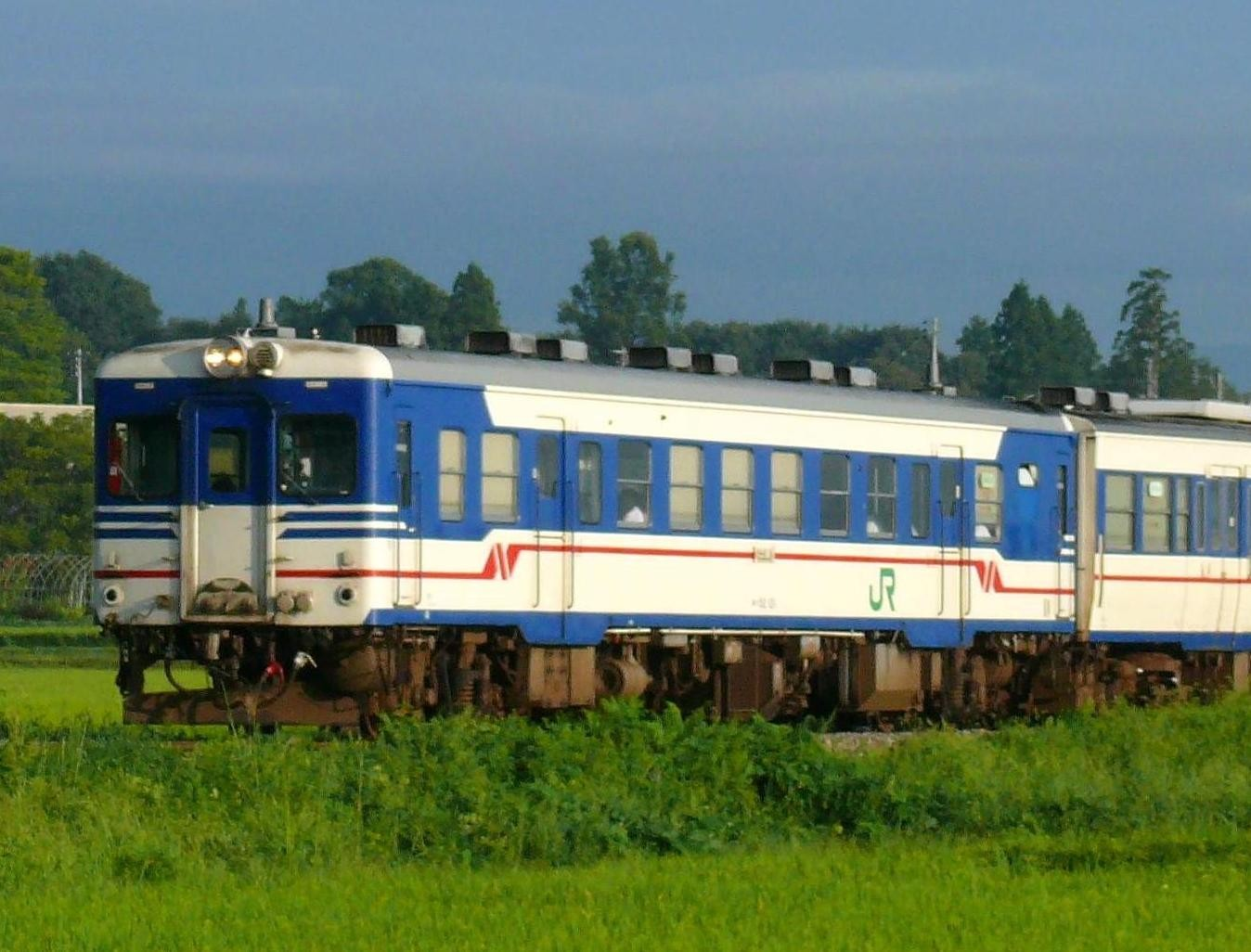
A JR East KiHa 52 in "Niigata" livery in September 2008

== Resale ==
Following withdrawal of the last remaining examples operated by JR-West, one car, KiHa 52 125, was resold to the private operator Isumi Railway in Chiba Prefecture in April 2011. This unit was built in 1965, and formerly operated on the Etsumi-Hoku Line and Ōito Line in the Hokuriku region until 2010.

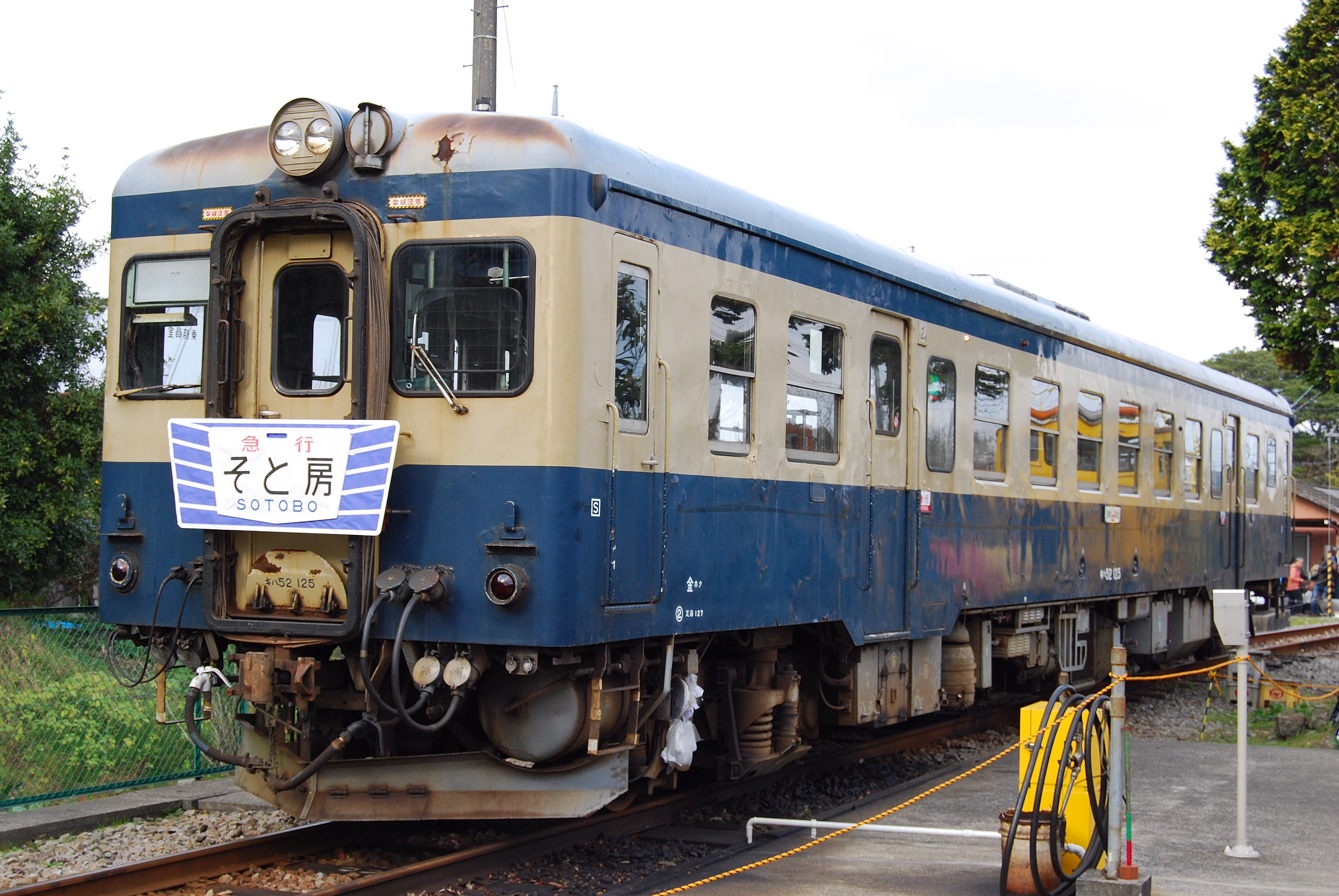
KiHa 52 125 in JNR two-tone blue & beige livery in May 2011

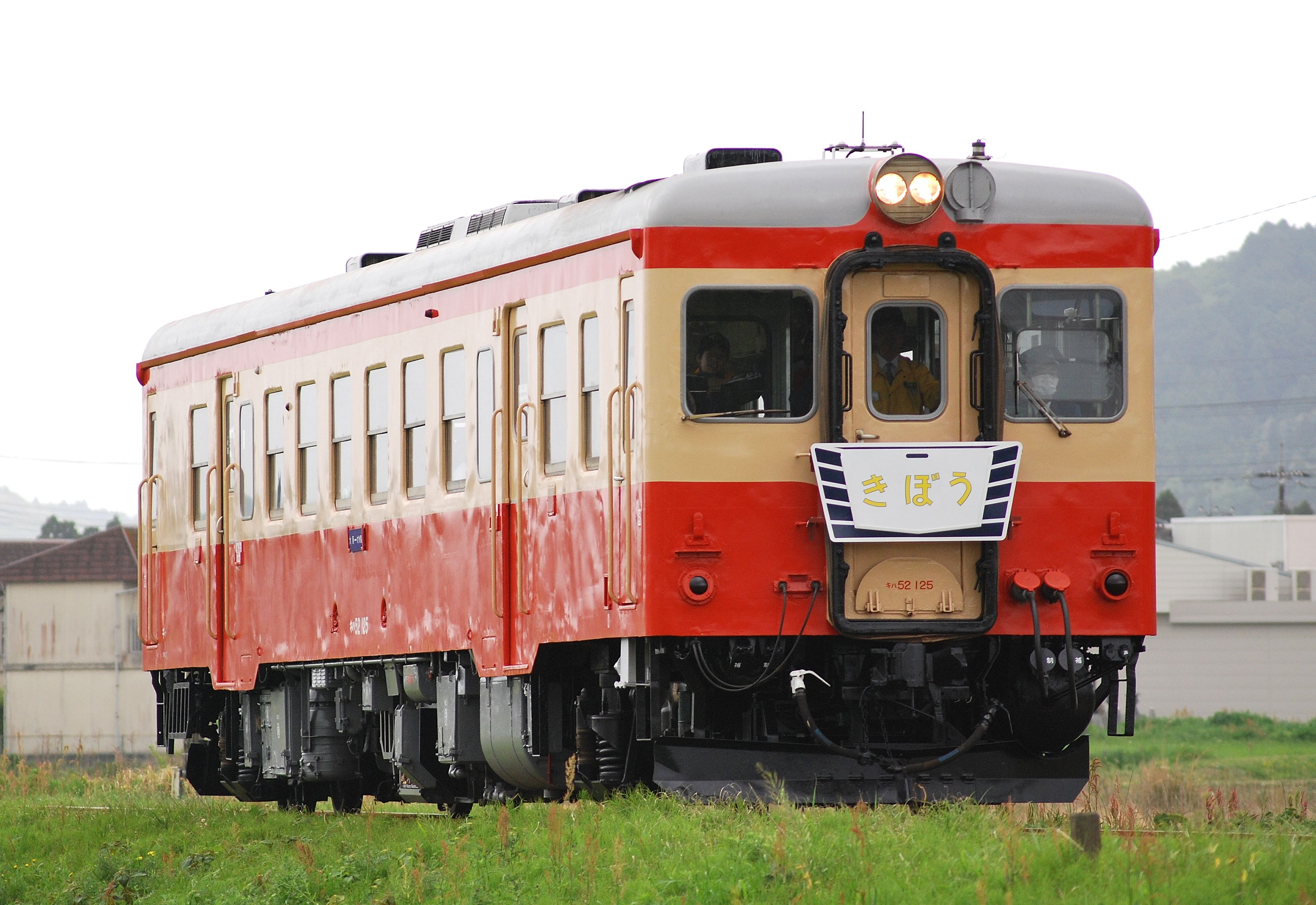
KiHa 52 125 in May 2011 after repainting into original JNR two-tone vermillion & beige livery

== Overseas operations ==
=== Myanmar ===
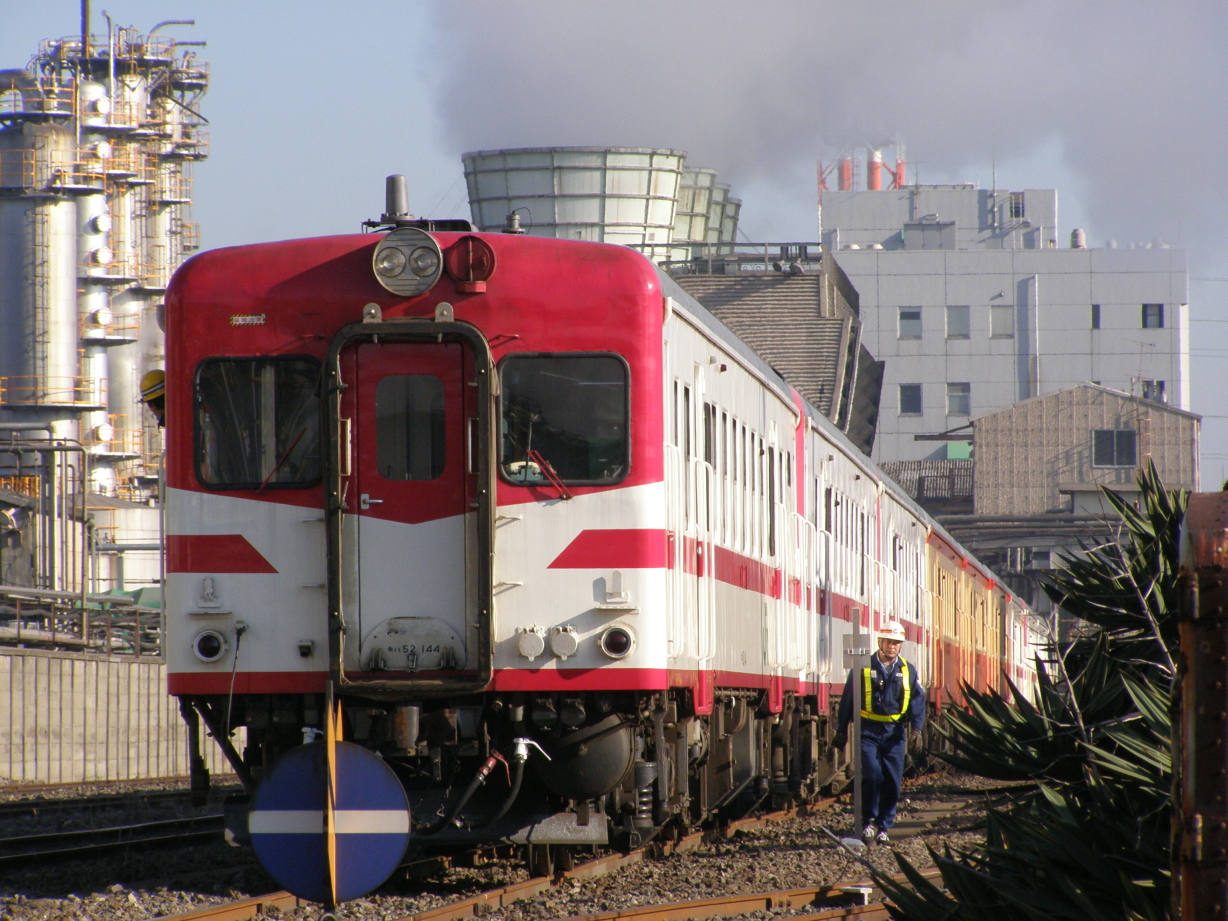
Former JR East KiHa 52 cars at Kawasaki awaiting shipping to Myanmar in December 2007

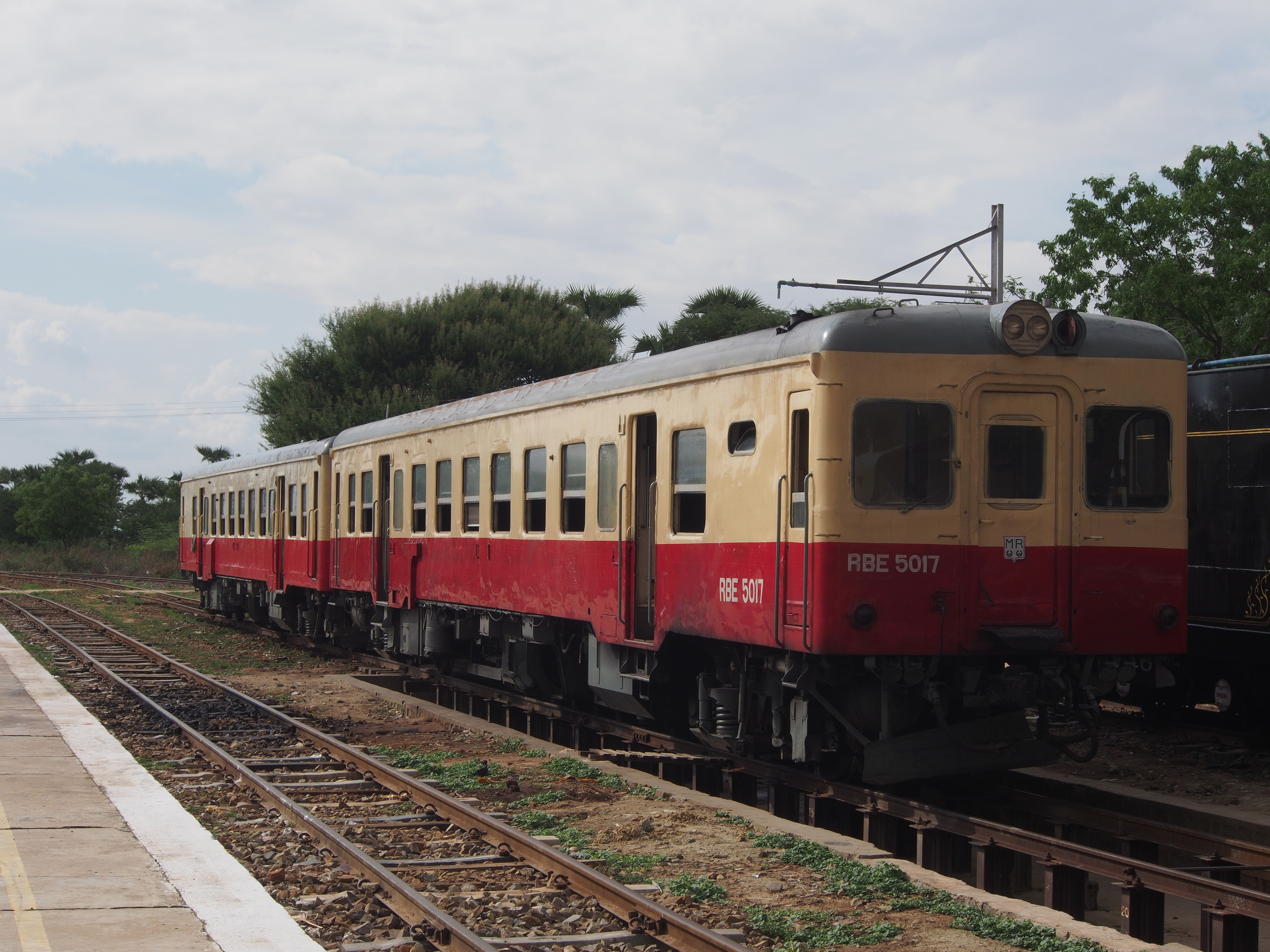
KiHa 52-154 (5017) in 2014

Seventeen former KiHa 52 Diesel Railcars were shipped to Myanmar to be operated by Myanmar Railways between 2007 and 2008. The following cars were transferred to Myanmar as shown:

| Former Body Number of JR Group | RBE Body Number by Myanmar Railways |
|---|---|
| KiHa 52-108 | RBE 5001 |
| KiHa 52-109 | RBE 5002 |
| KiHa 52-110 | RBE 5011 |
| KiHa 52-126 | RBE 5003 |
| KiHa 52-141 | RBE 5012 |
| KiHa 52-143 | RBE 5004 |
| KiHa 52-144 | RBE 5005 |
| KiHa 52-145 | RBE 5006 |
| KiHa 52-146 | RBE 5013 |
| KiHa 52-147 | RBE 5014 |
| KiHa 52-148 | RBE 5015 |
| KiHa 52-149 | RBE 5016 |
| KiHa 52-151 | RBE 5007 |
| KiHa 52-152 | RBE 5008 |
| KiHa 52-153 | RBE 5009 |
| KiHa 52-154 | RBE 5017 |
| KiHa 52-155 | RBE 5018 |

=== Philippines ===
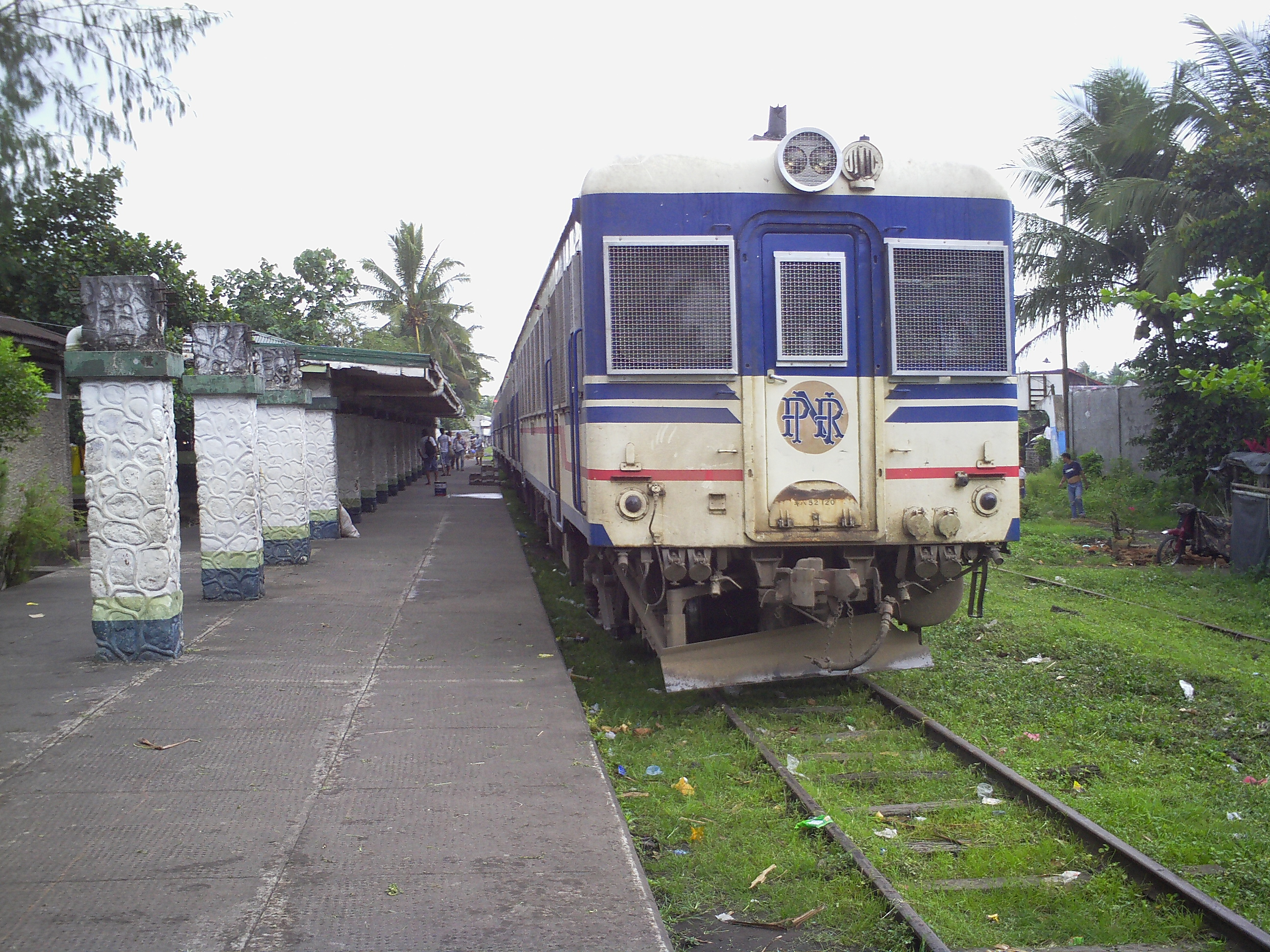
PNR KiHa 52 Blue At Ligao Station

Seven former JR East KiHa 52 cars originally based at JR East Niitsu Transportation Zone were donated in September 2011 to the Philippine National Railways (PNR), where they were used on commuter services in the Manila area. In October 2013, the trains were normally operated as two 3-car formations. The seventh car, KiHa 52 123, in Niigata livery, was taken out of service after operating for only seven months, and is stored at Tutuban Depot as a source of spare parts for the rest of the fleet.

The trainsets were retired from passenger service in 2020 and they were replaced by Indonesian-built PNR 8000 class DMUs on the PNR North Main Line. KiHa 52-122 was later refurbished as the newest member of PNR's maintenance fleet in Caloocan, named the "Rescue Train" with the orange livery. The other two units from the KiHa-O trainset are still in storage in Tutuban as of October 2021. KiHa-B trainsets on the other hand were already retired in 2016 and Bicol trainsets were replaced by KiHa 35s.

The former toilets in each car are locked out of use.

==== Formation ====
During their service as commuter trains, the two three-car sets were referred to as "KiHa-O" (for orange) and "KiHa-B" (for blue) named after the liveries they carry. They were formed as shown below.

| | ← Alabang Tutuban → | | |
| KiHa-O | 52-137 | 52-127 | 52-122 |
| KiHa-B | 52-102 | 52-120 | 52-121 |

== Preserved examples ==
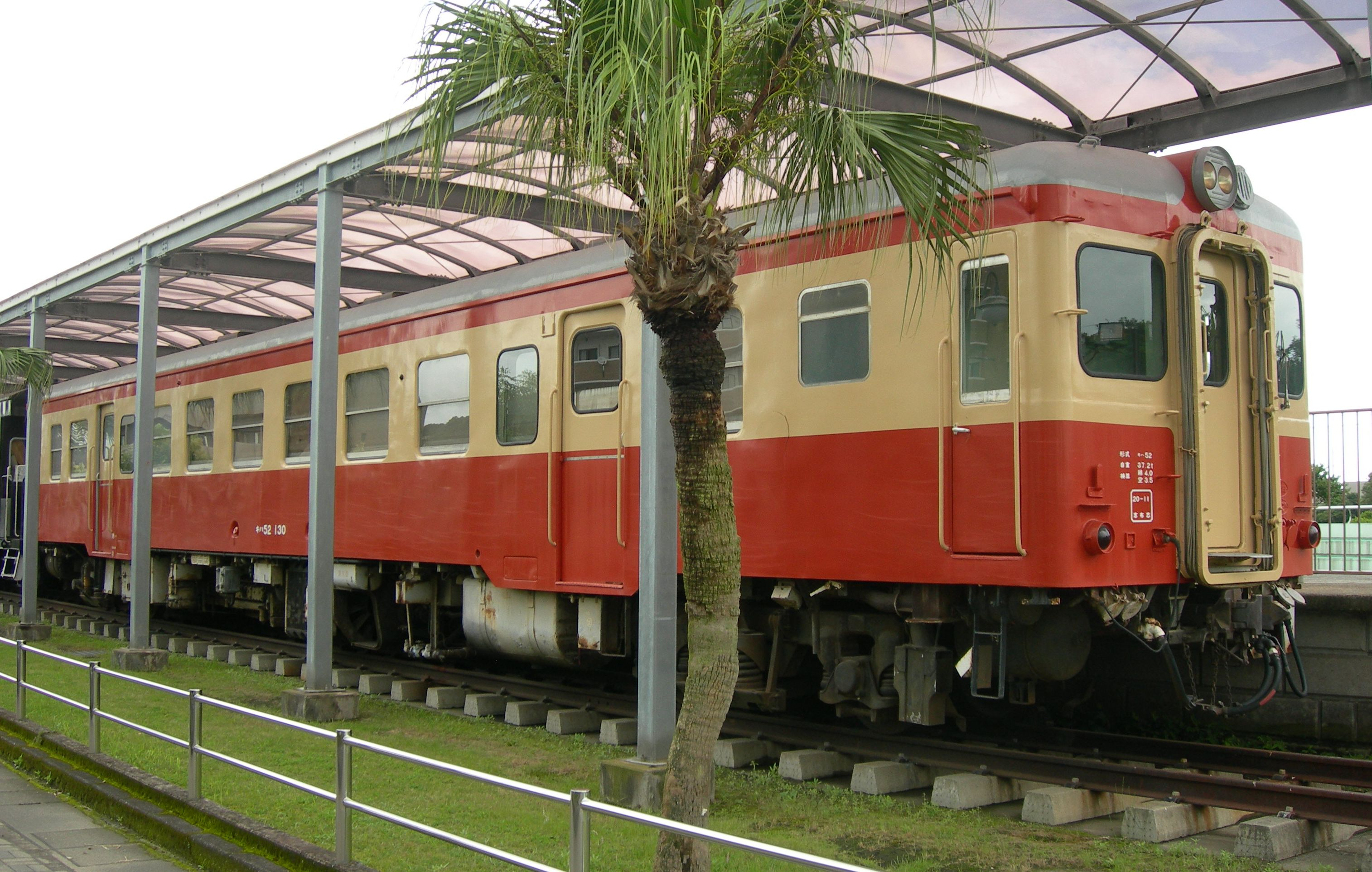
Preserved KiHa 52 130 in June 2010

In addition to KiHa 52 125 operated on the Isumi Railway, as of 2014 three Kiha 52 cars are preserved in Japan, as listed below.

- KiHa 52 115: Former Tsuyama Depot roundhouse, Tsuyama, Okayama
- KiHa 52 130: Osumi Line Memorial Park, Shibushi, Kagoshima
- KiHa 52 156: Inside Itoigawa Geostation Geopal at Itoigawa Station in Itoigawa, Niigata
