= Trett =

Weight of impurities calculated in the sale of bulk goods

Trett (or tret) was an allowance made up until the early 19th century, for waste, dust, and other impurity in items in commerce, generally amounting to 4 pounds (1.8 kg) in each 104 pounds (47 kg) (3.85%). It fell into disuse because merchants preferred to simply adjust the price, rather than make a calculation for trett.

== Usage ==
Trett was most commonly used in calculating the true weight for imported commodities to Great Britain which would be sold by the pound avoirdupois. From the gross weight, tare weight would be deducted, to account for the weight of any container that the commodity was enclosed in. The remainder was known as the suttle. Trett was deducted from the suttle at the rate of four pounds for every 104 pounds of commodity, to take account of any dust, sand, and other impurity included in the suttle. The remainder, after trett was deducted, became known as the "neat weight" or "nett weight", a term used in common for commodities in which no trett was to be deducted, but from which tare had been deducted.

== Disuse ==
By the early 19th century, trett had fallen into disuse, with merchants preferring to make allowances in the price for any impurity, as such allowance was far easier than the arithmetic calculation for trett. It was not used at custom houses, nor was it available at the British East India Company's warehouses.

== In Ireland ==
Trett varied considerably from the British usage, for goods in Ireland. For most goods there, trett was deducted at the rate of 1 pound per 112 pounds (0.89%). However, in Cork, trett was deducted after tare for wool at the rate of 8 pounds per 20 stone (2.86%), and in Dublin 8 pounds per 21 stone (2.72%). Additionally in Dublin, trett was deducted at the rate of 2 pounds (0.91 kg) per large cask of butter, 4 pounds (1.8 kg) per raw hide, and 8 pounds (3.6 kg) per beef carcasse.

== See also ==
- Tare weight
