= Strong Republic Transit System =

2003 Rail integration program in Manila, Philippines

Logo of the Strong Republic Transit System

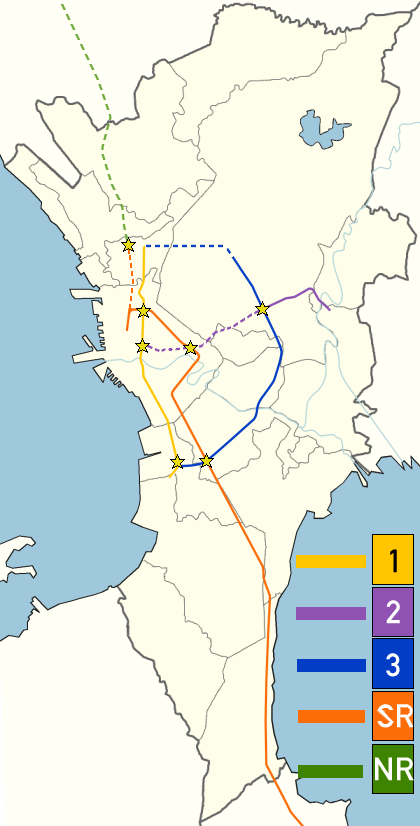
The initial situation of the railway and rapid transit lines, mid 2003. A star indicates an interchange station.

A sample Flash Pass Card

The Strong Republic Transit System (SRTS) was a program initiated by President Gloria Macapagal Arroyo on June 14, 2003, aimed at integrating the various rail lines providing public transport in Metro Manila, Philippines. It aimed to provide a "reliable, seamless and integrated mass transit system that would be at par with international standards" by unifying existing rail infrastructure under one transit system and fare structure. The Manila Light Rail Transit System (Line 1 and Line 2), the Manila Metro Rail Transit System (Line 3) and the Philippine National Railways (PNR) Northrail and Southrail lines were covered by the SRTS project.

== Links ==
The SRTS project provided seven "links", i.e. interchange stations, where commuters can transfer from one line to another. When the program was initiated, four links were in use. The Santa Mesa and Recto Link were added in April 2004, when the already-under-construction Line 2 became fully operational. The Northrail project was cancelled in September 2012; because of this, the Caloocan Link is missing. The proposed extension of Southrail services to Caloocan, a part of SRTS, was not executed either. The closing of the loop has, as of 2015, almost been completed by extending Line 1 with five new stations, unlike originally outlined by the plan. Line 1 would require one more station to connect it with Line 2. In order of operation, the following links have been realized (colour coding has since changed):

Link	Lines and stations			
Blumentritt Link	Line 1	Blumentritt	PNR Southrail	Blumentritt
Pasay Link	Line 1	EDSA	Line 3	Taft Avenue
Magallanes Link	PNR Southrail	EDSA	Line 3	Magallanes
Cubao Link	Line 2	Araneta Center-Cubao	Line 3	Araneta Center-Cubao
Santa Mesa Link	Line 2	Pureza	PNR Southrail	Santa Mesa
Recto Link	Line 2	Recto	Line 1	Doroteo Jose
Caloocan Link (not in use)	PNR Southrail	Caloocan	PNR Northrail	Caloocan

== Fare integration ==
The project aimed to unify fare systems on the lines through contactless smart cards, similar to the Octopus card in Hong Kong and the EZ-Link card in Singapore. The integrated system was not implemented, as the project was dropped. Instead, a weekly ticket, valid on Lines 1 to 3, was introduced in 2004. For ₱250 (equivalent to ₱470.96 in 2021), one can make unlimited rides per day on Lines 1 to 3 during one calendar week with the so-called Flash Pass Card.

== See also ==
- List of rail transit stations in the Greater Manila Area
- Manila Light Rail Transit System
  - Manila Light Rail Transit System Line 1 (Line 1)
  - Manila Light Rail Transit System Line 2 (Line 2)
- Manila Metro Rail Transit System Line 3 (Line 3)
- Philippine National Railways
  - PNR Metro Commuter (earlier names: Metro South Commuter, Orange Line, Metrotren, Commuter Express or Commex)
