= Tare weight =

Weight of an empty vehicle or container

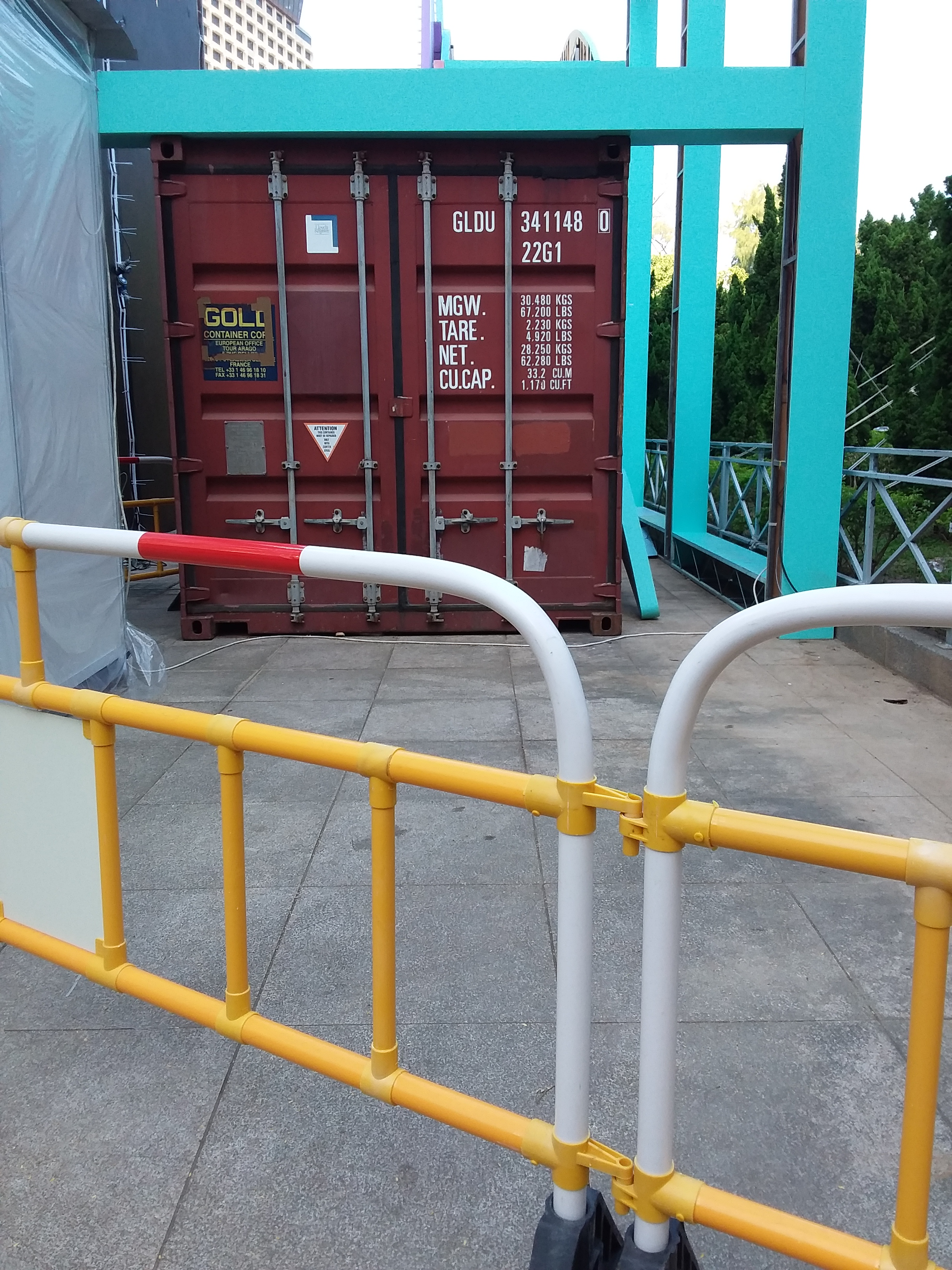
Tare weight: 2,230 kg (4,920 lb)

Tare weight /ˈtɛər/, sometimes called unladen weight or empty weight, is the weight of an empty vehicle or container. By subtracting tare weight from gross weight (laden weight), one can determine the weight of the goods carried or contained (the net weight).

== Etymology ==
The word tare originates from the Middle French word tare 'wastage in goods, deficiency, imperfection' (15th c.), from Italian tara, from Arabic طرح ṭarḥ, lit. 'thing deducted or rejected', from taraha 'to reject'.

== Usage ==
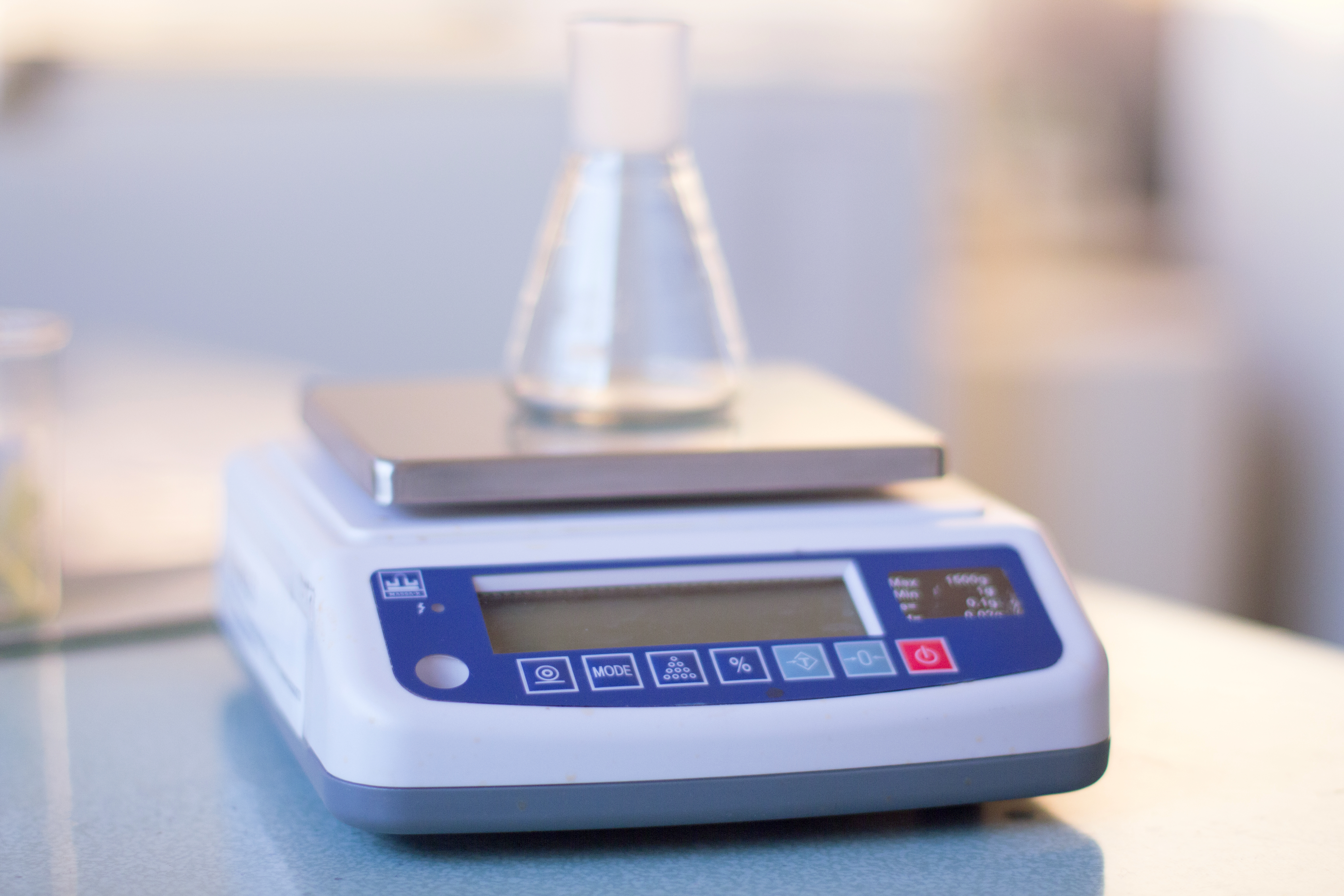
With a laboratory scale, the tare weight is the mass of the flask and the net weight is the mass of the contents.

The standard empty weight restriction sign in the United States

Tare weight can be useful in computing the cost of the goods carried for purposes of taxation or for tolls related to barge, rail, road, or other traffic, especially where the toll will vary with the value of the goods carried (e.g., tolls on the Erie Canal). Tare weight is often displayed upon the sides of railway cars and transport vehicles to facilitate the computation of the load carried. It is also used in body composition assessment when doing underwater weighing.

Tare weight is accounted for in kitchen scales, analytical (scientific) and other weighing scales which include a button that resets the display of the scales to zero when an empty container is placed on the weighing platform, in order subsequently to display only the weight of the contents added into the container.

In the United States, bridge weight limits for trucks and other heavy vehicles may be expressed in terms of gross vehicle weight or empty weight.

== See also ==
- Curb weight
- Dry weight
- Gross vehicle weight rating
- Hydrostatic weighing
- Trett (obsolete)
